= Pierce à Court =

British MP

Member of Parliament for Heytesbury
- In office 1722–1725 Serving with Edward Ashe
- Preceded by: Edward Ashe; William Ashe
- Succeeded by: Edward Ashe; William Ashe
- In office 1713–1715 Serving with Edward Ashe
- Preceded by: Edward Ashe; William Ashe
- Succeeded by: Edward Ashe; Lord Charles Cavendish

Personal details
- Born: c. 1677 Ivy Church, Wiltshire
- Died: 20 March 1725 (aged 47–48) Rodden, Somerset
- Spouse: Elizabeth Ashe (m. 1705; died 1725)
- Relations: Robert Pierce (grandfather)
- Children: Pierce Ashe-à Court; William Ashe-à Court

Pierce à Court (c. 1677 – 20 March 1725) was a British Whig politician who served as a Member of Parliament.

== Early life ==
À Court was born at Ivy Church, Wiltshire in c. 1677. He was the only son of John à Court (c. 1646–1701) of Bath and Rodden, Somerset, and the former Mary Pierce, a daughter of Dr. Robert Pierce of Bath.

His paternal grandparents were John à Court of Frome, Somerset and Lydia (née Brewer) à Court (a daughter of William Brewer).

He graduated from Lincoln College, Oxford on 29 March 1694, aged 16.

== Career ==
He succeeded to his father's estate in 1701.

Á Court was brought in as a Whig Member of Parliament by his brother-in-law, Edward Ashe, for the family borough, Heytesbury; serving from 1713 to 1715 and, again, from 1722 until his death in 1725. His seat was taken by Lord Charles Cavendish, a younger son of the 2nd Duke of Devonshire. His elder son, Pierce, took the seat in 1734.

== Personal life ==
In 1705 à Court was married to Elizabeth Ashe (1682–1768) of Ivy Church, Wiltshire, a daughter of William Ashe, MP of Heytesbury, and sister of Edward Ashe, also MP for Heytesbury. Elizabeth was the eventual heir to the Heytesbury Estate (including Heytesbury House), which had been bought by her grandfather, Edward Ashe, in 1641. Together, they were the parents of five sons and one daughter, including:

- Pierce Ashe-à Court (c. 1707–1768), who married Janet Brown, daughter of Col. Robert Brown and sister of Robiniana Mordaunt, Countess of Peterborough.
- William Ashe-à Court (c. 1708–1781), who married Annabella Vernon, daughter of Thomas Vernon, MP for Whitchurch (a son of Sir Thomas Vernon), in 1746.
- Alexander à Court (b. 1710), a Captain in the British Navy who died unmarried.
- Edward à Court (1711–1745), a Captain in the British Army who died, unmarried, in Ireland.
- Elizabeth à Court (1717–1723), who died young.
- John à Court (1707–1707), who died in infancy.

He died at Rodden, Somerset on 20 March 1725. He was succeeded in his estates by his eldest son, Pierce.

=== Descendants ===
Through his son William, he was a grandfather of Sir William à Court, 1st Baronet, who succeeded his father as MP for Heytesbury and was created a baronet in 1795. His great-grandson, William à Court, was raised to the peerage as Baron Heytesbury in 1828.

Parliament of Great Britain
| Preceded by Edward Ashe; William Ashe | Member of Parliament for Heytesbury; 1713–1715; With: Edward Ashe | Succeeded by Edward Ashe; William Ashe |
| Preceded by Edward Ashe; William Ashe | Member of Parliament for Heytesbury; 1722–1725; With: Edward Ashe | Succeeded by Edward Ashe; Lord Charles Cavendish |
