= Sir William à Court, 1st Baronet =

British soldier and Member of Parliament

Sir William Pierce Ashe à Court, 1st Baronet (c. 1747 – 22 July 1817) was a British soldier and Member of Parliament (MP).

== Early life ==
À Court was the only son of General William Ashe-à Court, MP for Heytesbury, and Anne Vernon, a daughter of Thomas Vernon.

His paternal grandparents were Pierce à Court, MP, and Elizabeth Ashe of Ivy Church, Wiltshire. His paternal uncle was Pierce A'Court-Ashe, also an MP for Heytesbury.

== Career ==
He represented Heytesbury in the House of Commons from 1781 to 1790 and again from 1806 to 1807. In 1795 he was created a baronet, of Heytesbury in the County of Wiltshire. He was appointed Lieutenant-Colonel of the short-lived Wiltshire Supplementary Militia in 1797 and High Sheriff of Wiltshire for 1812.

== Personal life ==
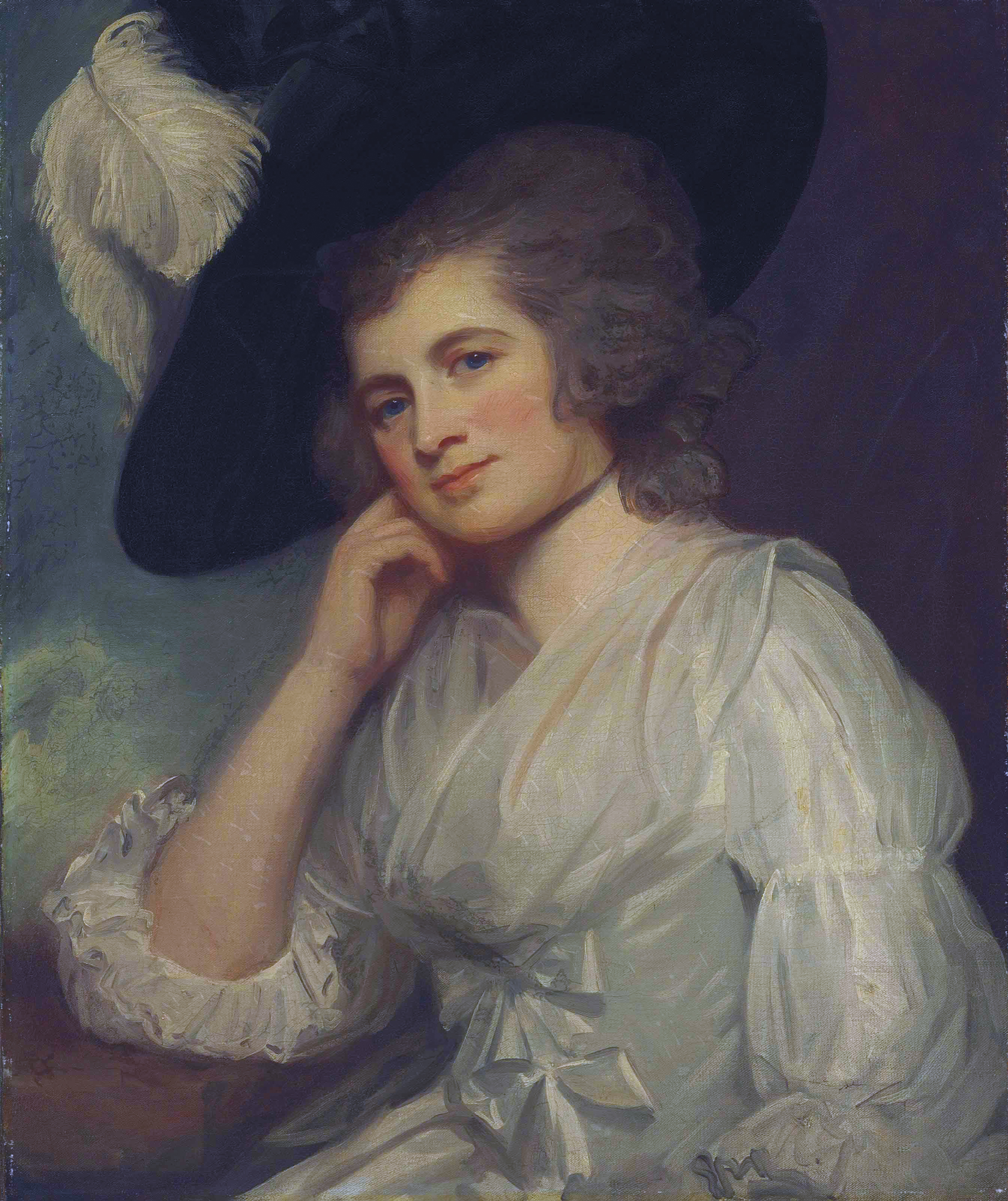
Laetitia à Court, née Wyndham (George Romney)

In 1769 à Court married Catherine Bradford, daughter of John Bradford. In 1777 Catherine A'Court died in Cheltenham, Gloucestershire; her memorial plaque in Cheltenham's parish church suggests this was due to her having been poisoned with arsenic by a servant. The following year à Court married Laetitia Wyndham, daughter of Henry Wyndham and sister of Henry Penruddocke Wyndham, MP for Wiltshire. Together they were the parents of six children:

- Letitia à Court (d. 1810), who married William Eliot, 2nd Earl of St Germans, a son of Edward Craggs-Eliot, 1st Baron Eliot and Catherine Elliston.
- Maria à Court (d. 1862), who married the Hon. Philip Pleydell-Bouverie, MP, a younger son of Jacob Pleydell-Bouverie, 2nd Earl of Radnor.
- William à Court, 1st Baron Heytesbury (1779–1860), who married Maria Rebecca Bouverie, daughter of the Hon. William Henry Bouverie (second son of the 1st Earl of Radnor), in 1808.
- Annabella à Court (1781–1866), who married Richard Beadon, son of the Very Rev. Richard Beadon, the Bishop of Gloucester and of Bath and Wells.
- Edward Henry à Court Repington (1783–1855), a Vice Adm. and MP for Tamworth; he died unmarried.
- Charles Ashe à Court Repington (1785–1861), a Lt.-Gen.; he married Mary Elizabeth Catherine Gibbs, granddaughter of Sir James Douglas, Foreign Minister to Naples.

He died in July 1817 and was succeeded in the baronetcy by his son William, who became Lord Lieutenant of Ireland and was elevated to the peerage as Baron Heytesbury in 1828. Lady à Court died in 1821.

=== Descendants ===
Through his youngest son Charles, he was posthumously a grandfather of Elizabeth Ash à Court-Repington (1822–1911), who married the Rt. Hon. Sidney Herbert in 1846 and had seven children, including the 13th and 14th Earls of Pembroke & Montgomery.

Parliament of Great Britain
| Preceded by William Ashe-à Court; William Eden | Member of Parliament for Heytesbury; 1781–1790; With: William Eden | Succeeded by The Lord Auckland; Michael Angelo Taylor |
Parliament of the United Kingdom
| Preceded by Viscount of Kirkwall; Charles Moore | Member of Parliament for Heytesbury; 1806–1807; With: Charles Abbot | Succeeded by Charles Moore; Michael Symes |
Baronetage of Great Britain
| New creation | Baronet (of Heytesbury); 1795–1817 | Succeeded by William à Court |
