= Samuel Ashe (MP) =

English lawyer and politician

Samuel Ashe (died 1708) was an English lawyer and politician who sat in the House of Commons in 1659 and from 1679 to 1681.

Ashe was the son of James Ashe, a clothier of Freshford, Somerset, and his wife Grace Pitt, daughter of Richard Pitt of Melcombe Regis. He entered the Inner Temple in 1646 and was called to the Bar in 1653. He was commissioner for assessment for Wiltshire from 1649 to 1652 and in 1657. Also in 1657, he bought the estate of Langley Burrell. In 1659, he was elected Member of Parliament for Heytesbury in the Third Protectorate Parliament. He was commissioner for assessment for Wiltshire from January 1660 to 1662, commissioner for militia in March 1660 and a J.P. from March to July 1660. He was commissioner for assessment for Wiltshire again from 1665 to 1680. From May the July 1674 he was JP for Wiltshire again. In October 1679 he was elected MP for Chippenham. He was commissioner for assessment for Wiltshire from 1689 to 1690.

Ashe died "very aged", and was buried at Langley Burrell on 8 November 1708.

Ashe was the brother of MPs John Ashe, Edward Ashe and Sir Joseph Ashe. Before 1666 he married Anne Pleydell, daughter of Oliver Pleydell of Shrivenham, Berkshire; they had two sons and three daughters. The second son, Joseph, was also elected for Chippenham.

Parliament of England
Preceded by Not represented in Second Protectorate Parliament	Member of Parliament for Heytesbury; 1659; With: John Ashe	Succeeded by Not represented in Restored Rump
