= Edward Ashe (died 1748) =

English landowner and Member of Parliament

Edward Ashe JP
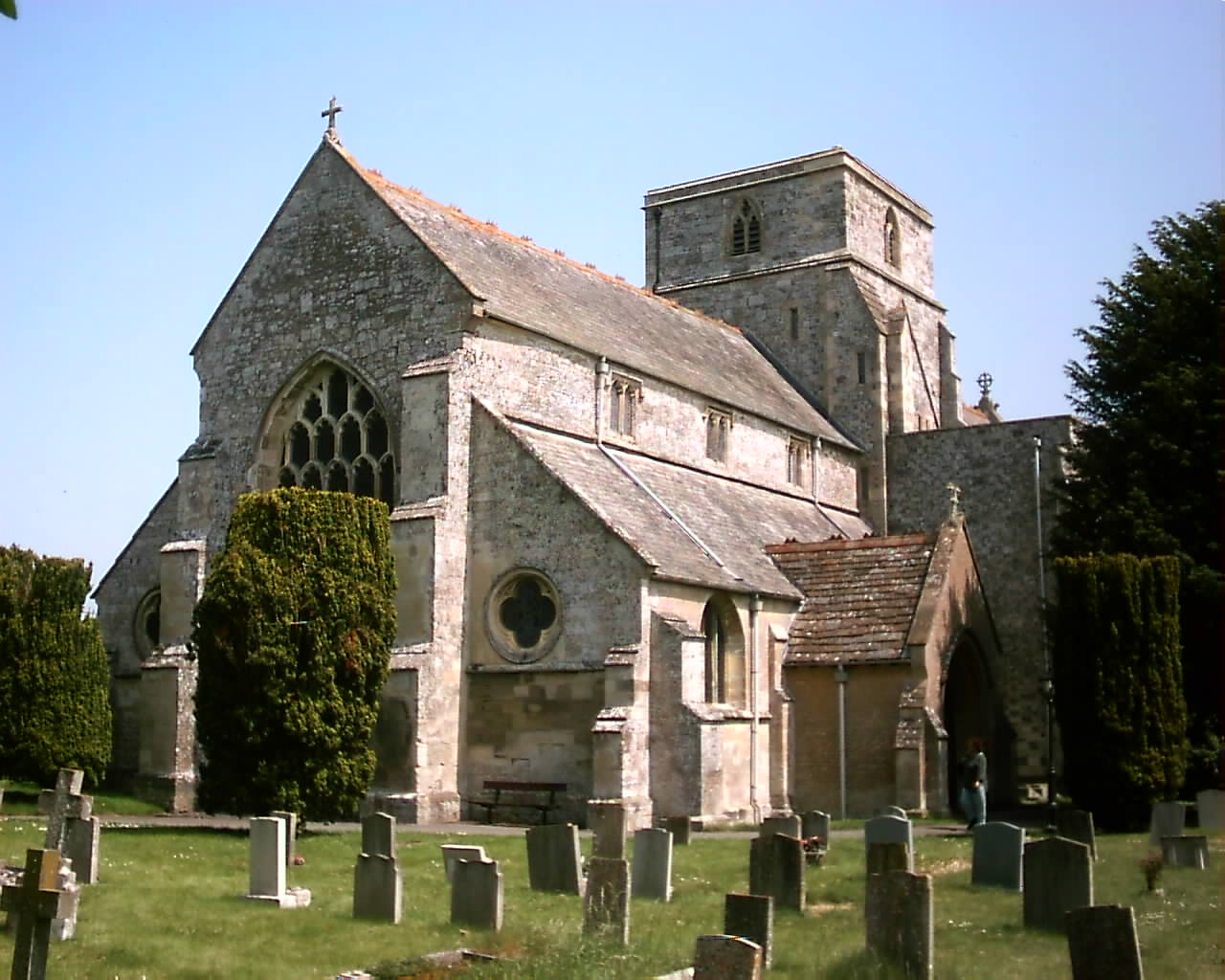
- St Peter and St Paul, Heytesbury, where Edward Ashe was buried

Board of Trade
- In office 1720–1746

Clerk of the Ordnance
- In office 1714–1718

MP for Heytesbury
- In office 1695–1747

Personal details
- Born: c. 1673 Heytesbury, Wiltshire
- Died: 22 May 1748 (aged 74) Heytesbury, Wiltshire
- Resting place: St Peter and St Paul, Heytesbury
- Party: Whig
- Spouse: Frances Luttrell
- Parent(s): William Ashe (1647-1713); Anne Popham (1649-1680)
- Education: Wadham College, Oxford
- Occupation: Landowner

Edward Ashe (c. 1673 – 22 May 1748) of Heytesbury, Wiltshire was an English landowner, and Member of Parliament for Heytesbury for 52 years, from 1695 to 1747.

Between 1640 and 1750, Heytesbury was continuously represented by a member of the Ashe family. His grandfather, Edward, father, William, brother, and nephew, were also MPs for the seat.

During his time in Parliament, he is recorded as making only one intervention, in 1733. A reliable Whig, and supporter of Robert Walpole, in 1720, he was given a seat on the Board of Trade, which he retained until 1746.

He died on 22 May 1748; he had no children from his marriage to Frances Luttrell, and his estate was inherited by his nephew, William Ashe, 1714 to 1750.

== Biography ==
Edward Ashe was the eldest son of William Ashe, and his first wife Anne Popham, daughter of Alexander Popham, MP of Littlecote, Wiltshire. He had a brother, William (1675-1732), the second MP for Heytesbury from 1708 to 1722, and a sister, Elizabeth (1682-1768). She married Pierce à Court, (1677-1725); her grandson, William Ashe-à Court, (c. 1747-1817), inherited the Heytesbury estate and was elevated to a baronet.

In 1710, Edward married Frances Luttrell; they had no children.

== Career ==
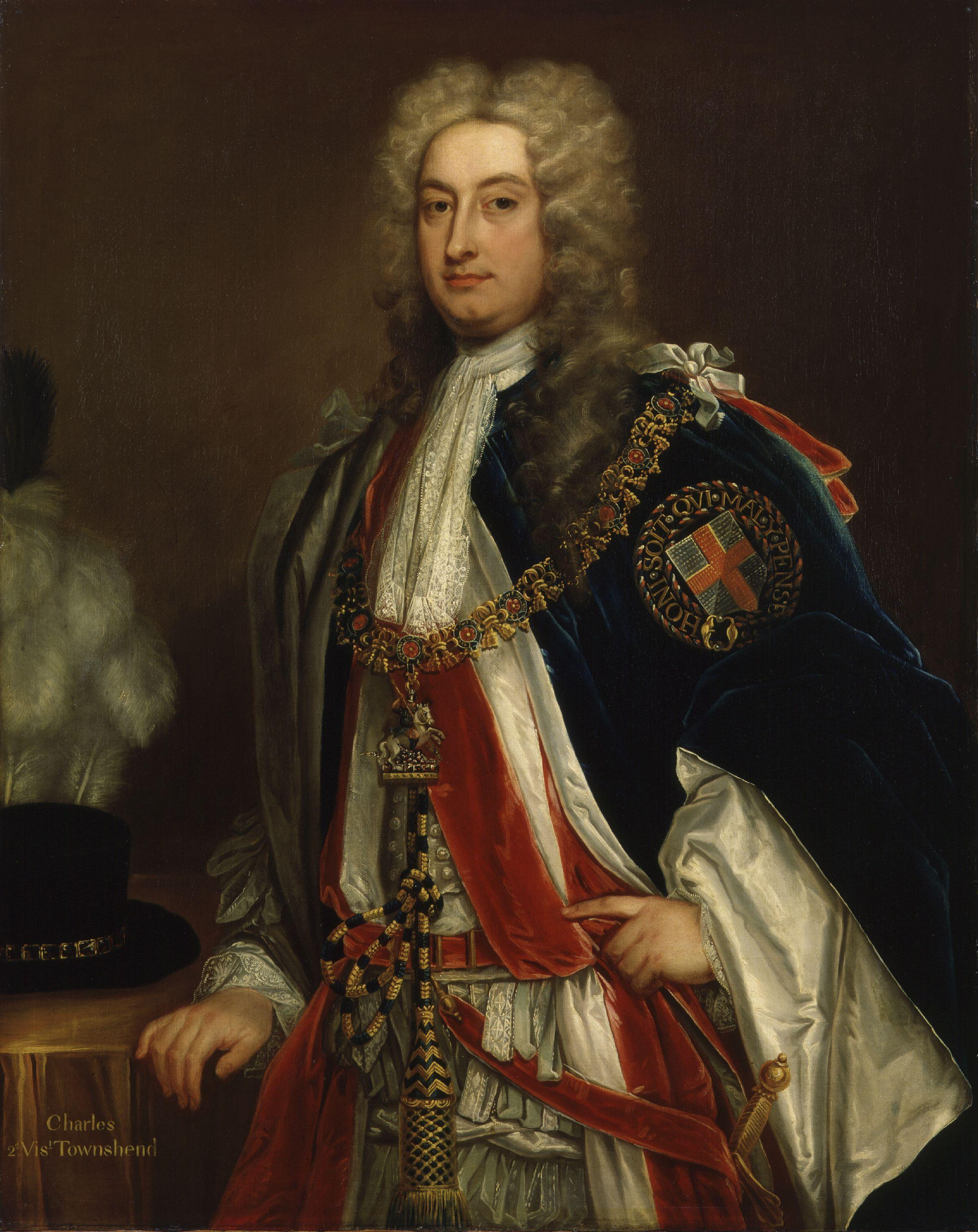
Viscount 'Turnip' Townshend, Ashe's political patron

He graduated from Wadham College, Oxford on 7 April 1690, and in the 1695 election, was nominated for Heytesbury. His grandfather, Edward, was a wealthy London merchant, who purchased the Heytesbury estate in 1641. The borough returned two MPs, and an Ashe family member, or connection, occupied these continuously from 1640 to 1770. with only 26 voters, only one election from 1690 to 1754 was contested.

Most of Wiltshire supported Parliament in the First English Civil War, while his father was a religious Independent. The Ashes were thus supporters of the 1688 Glorious Revolution, and reliable Whig voters. In 1696, Ashe voted for the execution of Jacobite plotter, Sir John Fenwick.

The Ashes were a large family; in the early 1700s, Edward and another seven direct relatives were MPs. He was also connected by marriage to Viscount 'Turnip' Townshend, Whig Secretary of State for the North, 1714 to 1717. Although out manoeuvred by Walpole for leadership of the party, he and his supporters remained an important faction.

As a result, Ashe held a number of government posts; he was Storekeeper of the Ordnance from 1710 until 1712, when he was removed by the 1713 Tory government. Restored by the Whigs as Clerk of the Ordnance in 1714, he lost office again when Townshend was defeated by his Whig rivals in 1718. Eventually, he was appointed to the Board of Trade, which he retained until 1746, although he played very little part in its activities. His lengthy service meant that he was briefly Father of the House.

He resigned his offices in 1746, on grounds of ill-health, and died on 22 May 1748; he was buried at St Peter and St Paul, Heytesbury.

== Sources ==
- Black, Jeremy (2008). Trade, Empire and British Foreign Policy, 1689-1815: Politics of a Commercial State. Routledge. ISBN 978-0415396066.
- Drummond, Mary (1964). A'COURT, William Pierce Ashe (c.1747-1817), of Heytesbury, Wiltshire, in The History of Parliament: the House of Commons 1754–1790 (Online ed.). HMSO.
- Frey, Linda; Frey, Marsha (2004). "Townshend, Charles, second Viscount Townshend". Oxford Dictionary of National Biography (online ed.). Oxford University Press. doi:10.1093/ref:odnb/27617. (Subscription, Wikipedia Library access or UK public library membership required.)
- Henning, Basil, ed. (1983). The House of Commons, 1660-90. Haynes Publishing. ISBN 978-0436192746.
- Lea, RS (1970). ASHE, Edward (?1673-1748), of Heytesbury, Wiltshire, in The History of Parliament: the House of Commons 1715–1754 (Online ed.). HMSO.

Parliament of England
Preceded by William Ashe; William Trenchard	Member of Parliament for Heytesbury; 1695–1707; With: William Ashe 1695–1701; Sir Edward Ernle 1701–1702; Sir William Monson 1702–1707	Succeeded by Parliament of Great Britain
Parliament of Great Britain
Preceded by Parliament of England	Member of Parliament for Heytesbury; 1707–1747; With: Sir William Monson 1707–1708; William Ashe 1708–1713, 1715–1722; Pierce A'Court 1713–1715, 1722–1725; Lord Charles Cavendish 1725–1727; Horatio Townshend 1727–1734; Pierce A'Court-Ashe 1734–1747	Succeeded by Pierce A'Court-Ashe; William Ashe
Preceded by Sir Roger Bradshaigh, 3rd Baronet	Father of the House; 1747	Succeeded by Thomas Cartwright
Military offices
Preceded by Robert Lowther	Storekeeper of the Ordnance; 1710–1712	Succeeded by Dixie Windsor
Preceded by Christopher Musgrave	Clerk of the Ordnance; 1714–1718	Succeeded by Thomas White
