= Paul Methuen (clothier) =

English cloth producer (1613–1667)

Paul Methuen (1613–1667) was a wealthy English clothier of Bradford-on-Avon, Wiltshire, described by antiquary John Aubrey as 'the greatest clothier of his time'.

Paul Methuen was born on 13 October 1613 at Frome, Somerset, where his father Anthony (d. 1640) was the vicar of St John's church. Nothing is known of his early years, but in 1641 he married Sarah Davison of Freshford, Somerset, and thus became brother-in-law to the clothier-politician John Ashe (1597–1659). By 1646 he had settled nearby at Bradford-on-Avon, where he acquired a large house with a tithe barn suitable for cloth-making and storage. After Methuen's first wife died, he married John Ashe's daughter Grace (d. 1700), and thus became his son-in-law.

Over the next 20 years Methuen became an important supplier of an expensive fabric known as 'Spanish cloth' to Ashe's younger brothers Edward and Jonathan Ashe, merchants in London. These cloths, made from fine yarn dyed in the wool and also known as medley broadcloths, were mostly exported to Paris, notably to members of the Le Couteulx family of Rouen and Paris, the forerunners of a notable banking family. When English fine broadcloth production came under heavy competition from the Dutch during the 1650s, Methuen was one of the first to respond by bringing a spinner from Amsterdam to settle in Bradford-on-Avon, the first of several dozen who moved to the area and greatly improved English yarn-making.

Methuen died in 1667 and was buried in the parish church of Holy Trinity on 18 July. In his will he left his dye-houses, workshops and fulling mills to his second son, Anthony Methuen (1652–1717), an ancestor of the Methuens of Corsham Court.
