= Rachel Russell =

Rachel Russell could refer to:

- Rachel Russell, Lady Russell, née Wriothesley, wife of William Russell, Lord Russell (c.1636 – 1723)
- Rachel Cavendish, Duchess of Devonshire, née Russell, wife of William Cavendish, 2nd Duke of Devonshire (1674 – 1725)
- Rachel Renée Russell, American author (born 1959)
