= Charles Abbot, 2nd Baron Colchester =

Royal Navy Admiral and politician (1798–1867)

Admiral The Right Honourable The Lord Colchester PC
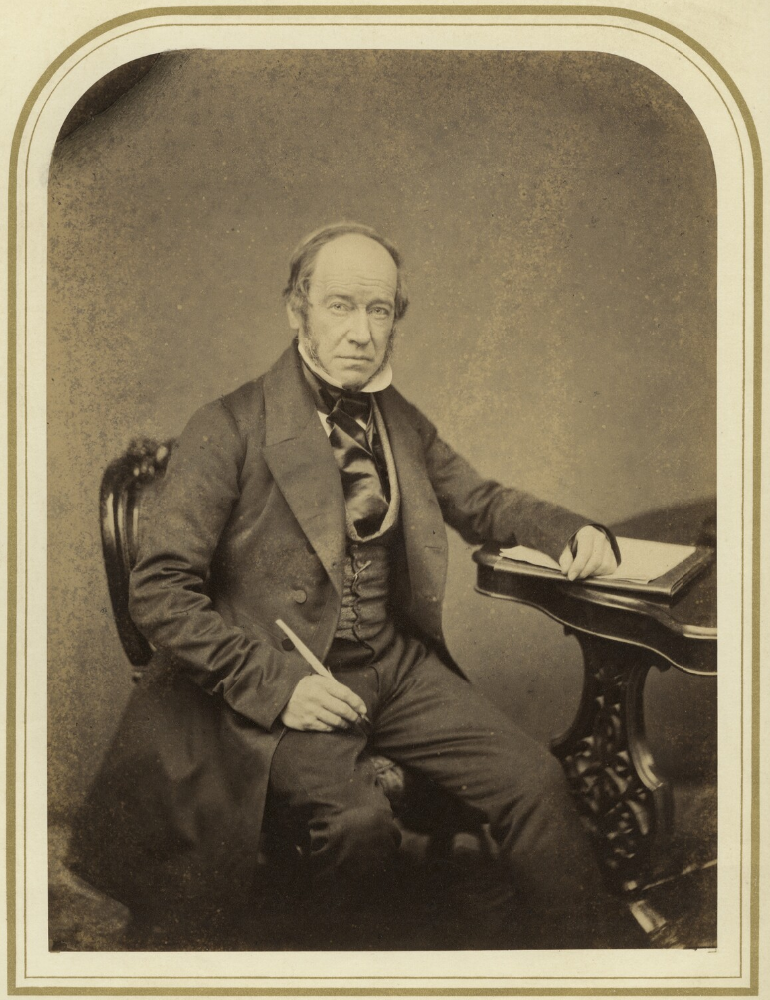

Paymaster General and Vice-President of the Board of Trade
- In office 27 February 1852 – 17 December 1852
- Monarch: Victoria
- Prime Minister: The Earl of Derby
- Preceded by: The Lord Stanley of Alderley
- Succeeded by: The Lord Stanley of Alderley

Postmaster General
- In office 13 March 1858 – 11 June 1859
- Monarch: Victoria
- Prime Minister: The Earl of Derby
- Preceded by: The Duke of Argyll
- Succeeded by: The Earl of Elgin

Personal details
- Born: 12 March 1798
- Died: 18 October 1867 (aged 69)
- Party: Conservative
- Spouse(s): Hon. Elizabeth Law (d. 1883)

Admiral Charles Abbot, 2nd Baron Colchester, PC (12 March 1798 – 18 October 1867), known as Charles Abbot before 1829, was a British naval commander and Conservative politician.

== Background and education ==
Colchester was the son of Charles Abbot, 1st Baron Colchester, Speaker of the House of Commons, and Elizabeth, daughter of Sir Philip Gibbes, 1st Baronet. He was educated at Westminster School and the Royal Naval College, Dartmouth.

== Naval career ==
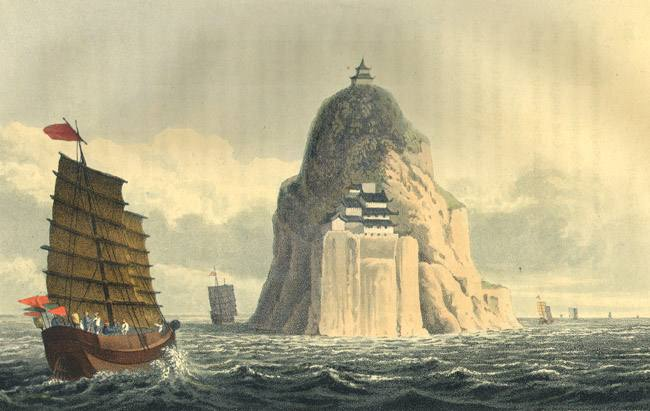
Seaou-Koo-Shan (Little Orphan Hill) in the Yangtze river in 1816, from a sketch by Abbot

Colchester served in the Royal Navy from 1811. He was promoted to Rear-Admiral in 1854, to Vice-Admiral in 1860 and to Admiral on the Reserved List in 1864.

== Political career ==
Colchester succeeded to his father's peerage in 1829 and entered the House of Lords. However, it was not until 1835 that he made his maiden speech. He served under the Earl of Derby as Paymaster General and Vice-President of the Board of Trade in 1852 and as Postmaster General between 1858 and 1859. In 1852 he was sworn of the Privy Council. Apart from his naval and political career he was also President of the Royal Geographical Society between 1845 and 1847. On 7 June 1853 the University of Oxford conferred on him a DCL.

== Family ==
Lord Colchester married the Hon. Elizabeth Susan, daughter of Edward Law, 1st Baron Ellenborough, in 1836. He died in October 1867, aged 69, and was succeeded in the barony by his son, Reginald. Lady Colchester died in March 1883.

Political offices
Preceded by The Lord Stanley of Alderley	Paymaster General; 1852	Succeeded by The Lord Stanley of Alderley
Preceded by The Lord Stanley of Alderley	Vice-President of the Board of Trade; 1852	Succeeded by The Lord Stanley of Alderley
Preceded by The Duke of Argyll	Postmaster General; 1858–1859	Succeeded by The Earl of Elgin
Peerage of the United Kingdom
Preceded by Charles Abbot	Baron Colchester; 1829–1867	Succeeded by Reginald Abbot
