= James Theobald =

James Theobald may refer to:

- James Theobald (politician) (1829–1894)
- James Theobald (natural historian) (1688–1759)
