= John Flavel (disambiguation) =

John Flavel was an English Presbyterian.

John Flavel may also refer to:

- John Flavel (logician) (1596–1617)

== See also ==
- John H. Flavell, psychologist
- John Flavelle (1863–1947), British tennis player
