= Robert Seymour =

Robert Seymour may refer to:

- Robert Seymour (MP) (1480–1545), MP for Heytesbury
- Lord Robert Seymour (1748–1831), British politician
- Robert Seymour (illustrator) (1798–1836), caricaturist and illustrator, including The Pickwick Papers by Charles Dickens
- Robert Seymour (loyalist) (1955–1988), Northern Irish loyalist and member of the Ulster Volunteer Force
- Bob Seymour (1916–1977), American football running back
