= Charles Berkeley, 2nd Viscount Fitzhardinge =

English politician (1599–1668)

Charles Berkeley, 2nd Viscount Fitzhardinge (14 December 1599 – 12 June 1668) was an English politician who sat in the House of Commons at various times between 1621 and 1668. He supported the Royalist cause in the English Civil War. He succeeded by special remainder to the peerage of his son who predeceased him.

Berkeley was the son of Sir Maurice Berkeley of Bruton, Somerset, of the Bruton branch of the Berkeley family, and his wife Elizabeth Killigrew, daughter of Sir William Killigrew (Chamberlain of the Exchequer) of Hanworth, Middlesex. He was educated at Eton College in 1613 and matriculated at Queen's College, Oxford on 3 November 1615 aged 15.

In 1621 Berkeley was elected Member of Parliament (MP) for Somerset. He was knighted in 1623. He was elected MP for Bodmin in 1624 and for Heytesbury in 1625, 1626 and 1628. He sat until 1629 when King Charles decided to rule without parliament for eleven years.

In April 1640, Berkeley was elected MP for Bath in the Short Parliament. He helped to organise the local resistance to ship-money, but was a Royalist during the Civil War executing a Commission of Array in 1642.

Following the Restoration, Berkeley was elected MP for Heytesbury and Bath in 1661 for the Cavalier Parliament. He was involved in a double returns in both seats but was returned at a by-election for Heytesbury after the election had been declared void and sat until his death.

Before his death Berkeley succeeded, by special remainder to the title Viscount Fitzhardinge on the death of his second son Charles who was killed at the Battle of Lowestoft, a naval engagement with the Dutch, on 3 June 1665. Berkeley died of apoplexy at the age of 68 and was buried at Bruton, in the Church of St Mary, Bruton.

Berkeley married Penelope Godolphin, daughter of Sir William Godolphin of Godolphin, Cornwall, and Thomasine Sydney, and had four sons. He was succeeded in the viscountcy by his eldest surviving son Maurice. His third son, William, became an admiral in the Royal Navy and was also killed fighting the Dutch, in the Four Days' Battle in 1666. Berkeley's brother John was a Royalist soldier and his brother William served as royal governor of the colony of Virginia.

Parliament of England
Preceded by Robert Hopton; Sir Henry Portman, Bt	Member of Parliament for Somerset; 1621–1622; With: Robert Hopton	Succeeded by John Symes; Sir Robert Phelips
Preceded by Sir John Trevor; James Bagg	Member of Parliament for Bodmin; 1624; With: Thomas Stafford	Succeeded by Robert Caesar; Henry Jermyn
Preceded by Sir Thomas Thynne; Sir Henry Ludlow	Member of Parliament for Heytesbury; 1625–1629; With: Edward Bysshe 1625; William Blake 1626; William Rolfe 1628–1629	Parliament suspended until 1640
Vacant Parliament suspended since 1629	Member of Parliament for Bath; 1640; With: Alexander Popham	Succeeded by William Bassett; Alexander Popham
Preceded by Thomas Moore; John Joliffe	Member of Parliament for Heytesbury; 1661–1668; With: John Joliffe	Succeeded by John Joliffe; William Ashe
Honorary titles
Preceded by William Seymour, 2nd Duke of Somerset	Custos Rotulorum of Somerset; 1660–1668	Succeeded by Henry Somerset, 3rd Marquess of Worcester
Peerage of Ireland
Preceded by Charles Berkeley	Viscount Fitzhardinge; 1665–1668	Succeeded by Maurice Berkeley
