= William Ashe (1647–1713) =

English politician

William Ashe (17 November 1647 – 22 October 1713), of the Inner Temple and Heytesbury, Wiltshire, was an English politician.

== Early life ==
He was born the son of Edward Ashe, of Fenchurch Street, London, who was MP for Heytesbury from 1640 to 1652, and Elizabeth Jolliffe, daughter of William Joliffe, brother of William Joliffe, of Leek. His paternal uncle was John Ashe, MP for Westbury and Somerset.

He was educated at the Inner Temple, (1652) and St Edmund Hall, Oxford, where he matriculated in 1664.

== Career ==
He succeeded his father in 1656 to his estates, including the Heytesbury estate in Wiltshire, rebuilding Heytesbury House in c. 1700.

=== Political career ===
He was a Member (MP) of the Parliament of England for Heytesbury on 8 October 1668, March 1679, October 1679, 1681, 1685, 1689, 1690, 1695, 1698 and January 1701 and for Wiltshire in December 1701.

He was also a Commissioner for assessment for Wiltshire from 1673 to 1680, for Kent from 1677 to 1680, and for Kent and Wiltshire from 1689 to 1690, he was a Justice of the Peace from 1689 to his death and a Deputy Lieutenant by 1701, probably to his death.

== Personal life ==
He married twice; firstly in 1670, Anne Popham, the daughter of Gen. Alexander Popham of Littlecote, Wiltshire, with whom he had four sons and a daughter, including:

- Edward Ashe (c. 1673–1748), MP for Heytesbury; he married Frances Luttrell in 1710.
- William Ashe (b. 1675), a merchant who was also MP for Heytesbury.
- Alexander Ashe (b. 1677)
- John Ashe (b. 1681)
- Elizabeth Ashe (1682–1768), who married Pierce à Court, also MP for Heytesbury.
- Laetitia Ashe, who married Thomas Penruddocke, son of Thomas Penruddocke, MP for Wilton.

He married, secondly, to Mary (née Rivett), Lady Appleton, the daughter of John Rivett, Skinner, of London and the widow of Sir Henry Appleton, 4th Baronet of South Benfleet, Essex.

He died in 1713 and was buried at Heytesbury. He was succeeded by his son Edward.

=== Descendants ===
Through his daughter Elizabeth, he was a grandfather of Pierce Ashe-à Court (c. 1707–1768), and William Ashe-à Court (c. 1708–1781), who married Annabella Vernon (a daughter of Thomas Vernon, MP for Whitchurch, and granddaughter of Sir Thomas Vernon).
