= Lord James Cavendish (MP for Malton) =

Col. Lord James Cavendish (born 1701 – died 1741) was a British soldier, nobleman, and politician.

Cavendish was the third son of William Cavendish, 2nd Duke of Devonshire and Hon. Rachel Russell.

On 1 November 1738, he was appointed colonel of the 34th Regiment of Foot. He led the regiment during the War of Jenkins' Ear, and was present at several engagements, including the investment of Cartagena and the attempt upon Cuba. He was returned in May 1741 as the Member of Parliament for Malton, while in Jamaica between the two aforementioned engagements, but he died in November, presumably of tropical illness.

Parliament of Great Britain
Preceded by Henry Finch; Sir William Wentworth	Member of Parliament for Malton; 1741; With: Henry Finch	Succeeded by Henry Finch; John Mostyn
Military offices
Preceded by Hon. Stephen Cornwallis	Colonel of Lord James Cavendish's Regiment of Foot; 1738–1741	Succeeded by Hon. James Cholmondeley
