= Michael Symes (diplomat) =

Irish soldier, diplomat and politician

Michael Symes FRS (1761–22 January 1809) was an Irish soldier, diplomat and politician.

== Early life ==
He was the fifth son of Richard Symes of Ballyarthur, and Eleanor Cliffe of Ross, County Wexford, and was educated at Trinity College Dublin.

Symes entered the East India Company Army in 1780, as a cadet in the Bengal Army. On furlough in 1786 as a lieutenant, he re-enlisted in 1787. He went to India again in the following year, with the newly raised 76th Regiment of Foot. He served as aide-de-camp to Sir Thomas Musgrave, 7th Baronet at Madras in 1791, became captain in 1793, and lieutenant-colonel in 1800.

== Missions to Burma ==
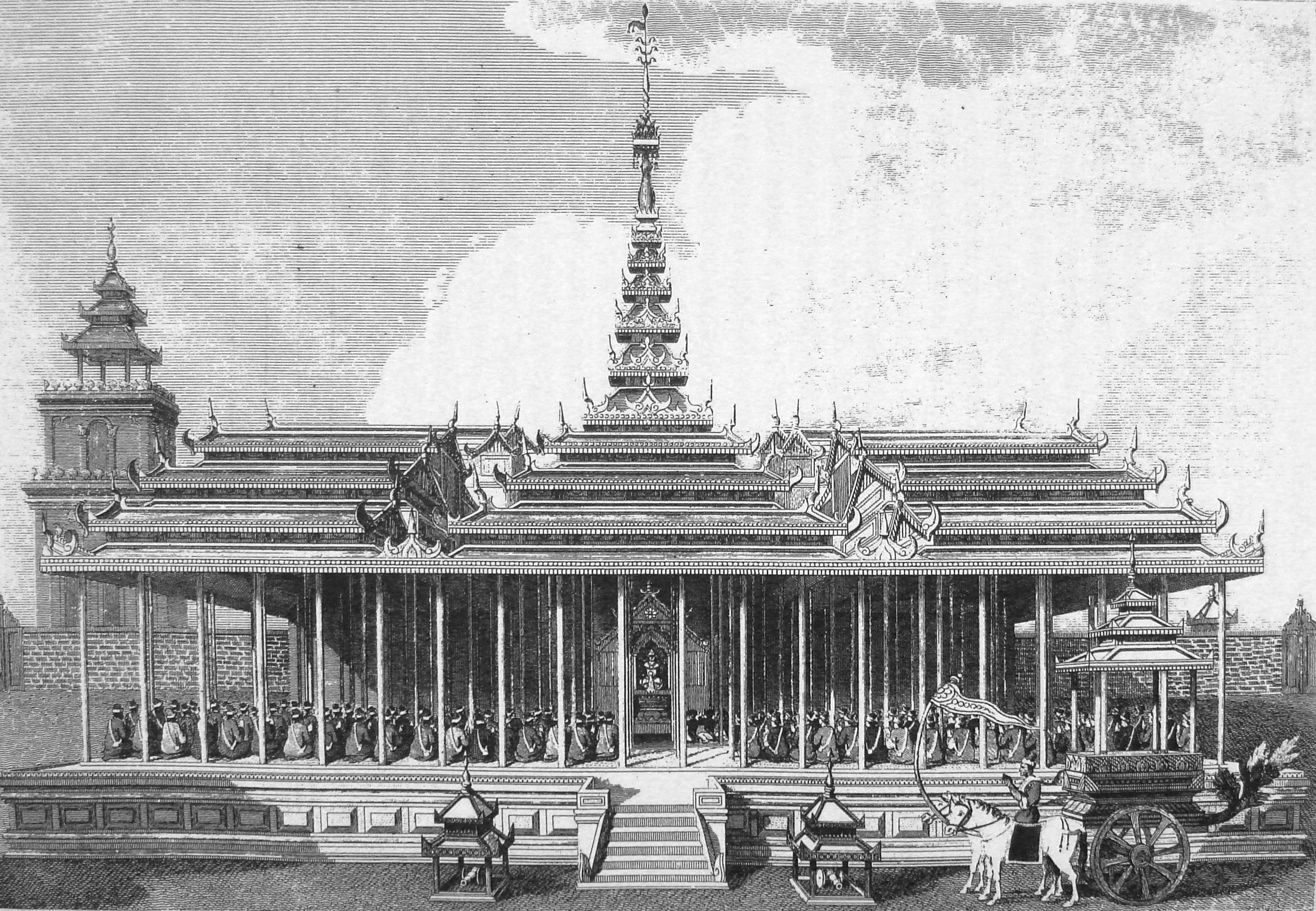
Amarapura Palace 1795, reception of the British embassy led by Michael Symes

In 1795 Symes was sent by Sir John Shore, the Governor-General of India, on a mission to Burma. He obtained from King Bodawpaya, then known to the British as King or Emperor of Ava, a royal order permitting a British agent to reside at Rangoon to protect the interests of British subjects. Francis Buchanan-Hamilton accompanied him, as botanist. When Hiram Cox went as agent, however, he found the situation other than he had understood, and there were recriminations against Symes.

Symes was elected a Fellow of the Royal Society in 1800. In 1802, when his regiment was at Kanpur, Symes was sent by Richard Wellesley, 1st Marquess Wellesley on a second mission to Ava. On this occasion it was to protest against the demand made by the Burmese governor of Arakan for the surrender of fugitives, who had sought refuge in the British district of Chittagong. In the capital, he obtained a verbal assurance that the demand should be withdrawn. On the journey back to Calcutta, where he arrived in February 1803, he was affronted by the Burmese governor of Rangoon.

== Later life ==
His regiment returned to England in 1806, and Symes was in poor health, but had a recommendation from Wellesley to the government. He was twice accommodated. First he had a seat at Carlow from the middle of 1806. The arrangement came to an end with the 1806 general election. A seat in parliament was again found for him in January 1807, after he had unsuccessfully contested St Ives. He became Member of Parliament for Heytesbury. The occurrence of the 1807 general election in short succession cancelled this second arrangement, with Sir William à Court, 1st Baronet. Symes stood for Morpeth, but dropped out of parliament.

Symes was sent in 1808 to Spain. He served during Sir John Moore's retreat to Coruña, suffered from the hardships of the campaign, and died on the way home, on board the transport Mary, on 22 January 1809. His body was taken from Portsmouth to Rochester, and buried in St. Margaret's Church on 3 February 1809.

== Works ==
Symes wrote An Account of an Embassy to the Kingdom of Ava sent by the Governal-General of India in 1795, London, 1800.

== Family ==
When on leave in England Symes married, on 18 February 1801, Jemima, daughter of Paul Pilcher of Rochester. His widow married Sir Joseph de Courcy Laffan, 1st Baronet, and died on 18 August 1835, aged 64.
