= Heytesbury (constituency) =

Former parliamentary constituency in the United Kingdom

- Former borough constituency for the House of Commons

1449–1832
- Seats: Two

Heytesbury was a parliamentary borough in Wiltshire which elected two Members of Parliament. From 1449 until 1707 it was represented in the House of Commons of England, and then in the British House of Commons until 1832, when the borough was abolished by the Reform Act 1832.

== History ==
The borough consisted of a small part of the small market town or large village of Heytesbury, in the south-west of Wiltshire. In 1831, when the population of the whole parish was 1,394, the borough had a population of only 81. Already a small settlement, much of Heytesbury burned to the ground in 1765, but this did not affect its right to return members to parliament. The houses lost were subsequently rebuilt.

Heytesbury was a burgage borough, meaning that the right to vote was reserved to the householders of specific properties or "burgage tenements" within the borough; there were twenty-six of these tenements by the time of the Reform Act, and all had been owned by the heads of the A'Court family since the 17th century, giving them control of the choice of the two Members. Shortly before the Reform Act, the head of the family, Sir William Ashe A'Court, was raised to the peerage as Lord Heytesbury. By 1832 there had been no contested elections for more than half a century.

Heytesbury was abolished as a constituency by the Reform Act, which swept away all such rotten and pocket boroughs. Its residents who were qualified to vote were transferred into the new South Wiltshire county division.

== Members of Parliament ==
=== 1449–1640 ===
Parliament	First member	Second member
1491	John Kingsmill	
1510–1523	No names known	
1529	Sir John Seymour	Robert Seymour
1536	?	
1539	?	
1542	?	
1545	William Sharington	Edward Chamberlain
1547	Thomas Throckmorton	Thomas Eynns
1553 (Mar)	?	
1553 (Oct)	Fulk Mounslowe alias Langley	Thomas Hill
1554 (Apr)	Richard Forsett	Christopher Dymars
1554 (Nov)	Henry Unton	?Thomas Chaffyn
1555	Thomas Hungerford	Fulk Mounslowe alias Langley
1558	Christopher Sackville	Henry Partridge
1559	Sir Ralph Hopton	Richard Pallady
1562–3	Richard Kingsmill	Richard Cabell
1571	Thomas Wroughton	Richard Cabell
1572	Sir John Thynne, died and replaced 1580 by Jasper Moore	Edward Stafford
1584	John Thynne	Lawrence Hyde I (died 1590)
1586	John Thynne	John Bennett
1588	Francis Zouche	Joshua Elmer
1593	John Thynne	Thomas Thynne
1597	John Thynne	Lawrence Hyde II
1601	John Thynne	Richard Smythe
1604–1611	Sir William Eyre	Walter Gowen
1614	Sir Henry Ludlow	Walter Gowen
1621–1622	Sir Thomas Thynne	Sir Henry Ludlow
1624	Sir Thomas Thynne	Sir Henry Ludlow
1625	Sir Charles Berkeley	Edward Bisse
1626	Sir Charles Berkeley	William Blake
1628–1629	Sir Charles Berkeley	William Rolfe
1629–1640	No Parliaments summoned	

=== 1640–1832 ===
Year	First member	First party	Second member	Second party
April 1640	Sir John Berkeley		Thomas Moore	
November 1640	Edward Ashe	Parliamentarian	Thomas Moore	Parliamentarian
December 1648	Edward Ashe	Parliamentarian	Moore excluded in Pride's Purge – seat vacant	
1653	Heytesbury was unrepresented in the Barebones Parliament and the First and Second Parliaments of the Protectorate			
January 1659	John Ashe		Samuel Ashe	
May 1659	Not represented in the restored Rump			
April 1660	Thomas Moore		John Jolliffe	
1661	Sir Charles Berkeley		John Jolliffe	
1668	William Ashe	Whig	John Jolliffe	
February 1679	William Ashe	Whig	Edward Ashe	
1689	William Ashe	Whig	William Sacheverell	Whig
1690	William Ashe	Whig	William Trenchard	
1695	William Ashe	Whig	Edward Ashe	
1701	Sir Edward Ernle		Edward Ashe	
1702	William Monson		Edward Ashe	
1708	William Ashe		Edward Ashe	
1713	Pierce A'Court		Edward Ashe	
1715	William Ashe		Edward Ashe	
1722	Pierce A'Court		Edward Ashe	
1725	Lord Charles Cavendish	Whig	Edward Ashe	
1727	Horatio Townshend		Edward Ashe	
1734	Pierce A'Court-Ashe		Edward Ashe	
1747	Pierce A'Court-Ashe		William Ashe	
1751	Pierce A'Court-Ashe		William A'Court	
1768	Charles FitzRoy-Scudamore		William A'Court	
1774	Hon. William Gordon		William A'Court	
September 1780	William Eden		William A'Court	
December 1780	Francis Burton		William A'Court	
1781	Francis Burton		William Pierce Ashe A'Court	
1784	William Eden		William Pierce Ashe A'Court	
1790	William Eden		Michael Angelo Taylor	
1791	William Eden		The Earl of Barrymore	
1793	William Eden		Charles Rose Ellis	
1793	The Viscount Clifden		Charles Rose Ellis	
1796	The Viscount Clifden		Sir John Leicester, Bt	
February 1802	William Wickham		Sir John Leicester, Bt	
July 1802	Charles Abbot		Viscount Kirkwall	
December 1802	Dr Charles Moore		Viscount Kirkwall	
1806	Charles Abbot		Sir William a'Court	
January 1807	Dr Charles Moore		Michael Symes	
May 1807	Dr Charles Moore		Viscount Fitzharris	
1812	Samuel Hood		Charles Duncombe	
1818	George James Welbore Agar-Ellis		William Henry John Scott	
March 1820	Edward Henry A'Court		Charles Ashe A'Court	
August 1820	Edward Henry A'Court		Henry Handley	
1826	Edward Henry A'Court		Henry Stafford Northcote	
1830	Edward Henry A'Court		Sir George Staunton	Independent
1831	Edward Henry A'Court		Sir George Staunton	Independent
1832	Constituency abolished			
