= Lord Charles Cavendish (politician, born 1704) =

British politician; (1704–1783)

Member of Parliament for Heytesbury
- In office 1725–1727
- Preceded by: Pierce A'Court
- Succeeded by: Horatio Townshend

Personal details
- Born: 17 March 1704
- Died: 28 April 1783 (aged 79)
- Spouse: Anne de Grey
- Children: Henry Cavendish
- Parent(s): William Cavendish, 2nd Duke of Devonshire; Rachel Cavendish, Duchess of Devonshire

Lord Charles Cavendish FRS (17 March 1704 – 28 April 1783) was a British nobleman, Whig politician, and scientist.

== Biography ==
Cavendish was the youngest son of William Cavendish, 2nd Duke of Devonshire, and Rachel Russell. He entered Eton College in 1718.

On 9 January 1727, Lord Charles Cavendish married Lady Anne de Grey (died 20 September 1733), daughter of Henry Grey, 1st Duke of Kent, and Jemima, his first wife. They had two children: Henry Cavendish (1731–1810), considered one of the most accomplished physicists and chemists of his era, and Frederick Cavendish (1733–1812).

Cavendish entered the House of Commons for Heytesbury in 1725 and would remain a member in various seats until 1741, when he turned the "family seat" of Derbyshire over to his nephew William Cavendish, Marquess of Hartington.

== Scientific research ==
In 1757 the Royal Society (of which he was vice-president) awarded him the Copley Medal for his work in the development of thermometers which recorded the maximum and minimum temperatures they had reached.

Charles Cavendish was also one of the early experimenters with the electrical storage device, the Leyden jar, which came to England in 1746. His interest in electrical research was passed on to his son Henry who was also a prominent member of the Royal Society. Henry Cavendish was even better known than his father for electrical experiments, and also for other discoveries in physics, including the famous torsion-balance measurement of the mass of the earth.

One of Charles Cavendish's experiments with electricity appears to have been an attempt to replicate the plasma glow seen during the early Francis Hauksbee experiment with a semi-vacuum in the friction-generator's glass globe. A recent thesis on plasma arcs mentions Priestley's account of a replication of this by the experimenter Benjamin Wilson (1721–1788):

In 1759, when Wilson repeated experiments "first contrived by Lord Charles Cavendish," he observed a "singular appearance of light upon one of the surfaces of the quicksilver," (from The History and Present State of Electricity, J Priestly (1775) vol. I, p. 355). The quicksilver (mercury) was part of the evacuation scheme, and it is not clear, but possible, that Wilson was referring to a cathode spot on mercury.

Parliament of Great Britain
Preceded by Pierce A'Court; Edward Ashe	Member for Heytesbury; 1725–1727; With: Edward Ashe	Succeeded by Horatio Townshend; Edward Ashe
Preceded by Charles Montagu; The Lord Carpenter	Member for Westminster; 1727–1734; With: William Clayton	Succeeded by William Clayton; Sir Charles Wager
Preceded by Godfrey Clarke; Sir Nathaniel Curzon, 4th Bt	Member for Derbyshire; 1734–1741; With: Sir Nathaniel Curzon, 4th Bt	Succeeded by Sir Nathaniel Curzon, 4th Bt; Marquess of Hartington
