= Christopher Sackville =

16th-century English politician

Christopher Sackville (by 1519 – 1558/1559), of Albourne and Worth, Sussex, was an English politician.

== Family ==
He was the father of John Sackville, MP for East Grinstead.

== Career ==
He was a member of parliament (MP) for Heytesbury in 1558.
