= Alexander Huish =

English cleric, academic and biblical scholar

Alexander Huish (1594?–1668) was an English cleric, academic and biblical scholar.

== Life ==
He was the son of John Hewish or Huish, born in the parish of St. Cuthbert, Wells, Somerset, in 1594 or 1595. He entered Magdalen Hall, Oxford, in 1609, from which he was invited in 1613 by Dorothy Wadham, the foundress of Wadham College, to be one of the original scholars of the new college. On 10 February 1614 he was admitted B.A., the first of the college to graduate.

On 27 June 1614 Huish was recommended for election to the fellowship by the foundress, and was admitted 30 June 1615. He proceeded M.A. on 17 December 1616, and B.D. on 2 June 1627. He held various college offices, and resigned his fellowship 28 June 1629.

Huish was appointed a prebendary of Wedmore Secunda in Wells Cathedral on 26 October 1627, was given the rectory of Beckington, Somerset, on 21 December 1628, and that of Hornblotton in the same county on 6 February 1638. He had trouble with his congregation when he implemented ritual changes in line with Laudianism, from 1634–5 when his diocesan bishop William Piers attempted to impose uniformity. Opposition was fomented by John Ashe, and disorders occurred that became known as the "Beckington riots". When the inhabitants of Beckington petitioned parliament about his innovations in the services, he was arrested as a delinquent in 1640, and was at one time imprisoned at Chalfield, near Bradford, Wiltshire. He was formally dispossessed of Beckington in 1650, when John After took possession.

At the Restoration of 1660, Huish recovered both his livings, and received in addition, on 12 September 1660, the prebend of Whitelackington in Wells Cathedral. He died in April 1668.

== Works ==
Huish was author of:

- Lectures upon the Lord's Prayer, 3 pts., London, 1626.
- Musa Ruralis; in adventum … Caroli II., … vota, suspiria, gaudia, et rursum vota: quæ suo, aliorumque rectorum, non rectorum, ruralium nomine, effudit A. Huissus, London, 1660.

Huish also edited John Flavel's Tractatus de Demonstratione, 1619. Brian Walton selected him as one of the four correctors of his Polyglott Bible while in the press. Huish worked on the Septuagint, the Greek text of the New Testament, and the Latin Vulgate. He collated the Codex Alexandrinus. In the final volume (vi.) Huish wrote, according to Anthony Wood, "A Greek Hymn with the Latin to it". He also had a poem in the Oxford Verses on the death of Anne of Denmark, and contributed to the Ultima Lima Savilii, 1622.

== Notes ==
Attribution

This article incorporates text from a publication now in the public domain: Lee, Sidney, ed. (1891). "Huish, Alexander". Dictionary of National Biography. Vol. 28. London: Smith, Elder & Co.
