= Thomas Moore (Roundhead) =

English politician

Thomas Moore (14 April 1618 – 6 August 1695) of Hawkchurch, then in Dorset (now in Devon), was an English politician who sat in the House of Commons variously between 1640 and 1685. He supported the Parliamentarian side in the English Civil War.

Moore was the son of Thomas Moore of Lyng Manor, Somerset.

In April 1640, Moore was elected member of parliament for Heytesbury in the Short Parliament. He was re-elected MP for Heytesbury in November 1640 for the Long Parliament and held the seat until he was excluded under Pride's Purge in 1648. In 1660 Moore was elected MP for Heytesbury and Lyme Regis and chose to sit for Heytesbury.

He was a justice of the peace for Somerset and Dorset and was appointed High Sheriff of Dorset for 1671–72. He was Deputy Lieutenant of Dorset and Somerset from May–October 1688.

Moore was a presbyterian. After the ejection of puritan ministers from their parishes, he often paid the fines of Richard Alleine, the ejected vicar of Batcombe.

Moore died in 1695 at the age of 77 and was buried at Hawkchurch. He had married twice: firstly Bridget, the daughter of Sir Thomas Trenchard of Wolveton, Dorset, and secondly Elizabeth, the daughter of Sir John Bampfield of Poltimore, Devon, with whom he had 3 sons, who all predeceased him, and 7 daughters. His estate was divided between his four sons-in-law. His seat at Hawkchurch passed to Thomas Wyndham, MP for Wilton.

Parliament of England
Parliament suspended since 1629	Member of Parliament for Heytesbury; 1640–1648; With: Sir John Berkeley 1640; Edward Ashe 1640–1648	Not represented in Rump Parliament
Preceded by Sir Edmund Prideaux	Member of Parliament for Lyme Regis; 1660; With: Sir Walter Yonge, 2nd Baronet	Succeeded by Sir Walter Yonge, 2nd Baronet; Henry Hyde
Not represented in the restored Rump	Member of Parliament for Heytesbury; 1660; With: John Joliffe	Succeeded by John Joliffe; Sir Charles Berkeley
