= Godfrey Clarke =

English landowner and politician

Godfrey Clarke (born c. 1684 – 1734), was an English landowner and politician who sat in the House of Commons from 1710 to 1734.

Clarke was the son of Sir Gilbert Clarke of Chilcote and his second wife Barbara Clerke daughter of George Clerke of Northamptonshire. The family was long associated with Somersall Hall and had acquired Chilcote Hall (now demolished) in the 17th century. He was educated at Rugby School in 1690 and matriculated at Magdalen College, Oxford on 25 June 1695, aged 16. He succeeded his father on 30 May 1701. He was appointed deputy-lieutenant in 1702, and was High Sheriff of Derbyshire for the year 1705 to 1706. He contracted a favourable marriage with Catherine Stanhope daughter of Philip Stanhope, 2nd Earl of Chesterfield in 1706 and this connected him with the peerage.

Clarke was returned unopposed as Member of Parliament for Derbyshire at the 1710 general election. He was returned unopposed with Curzon again in 1713, and was classed as a Tory. Clarke was returned unopposed at the 1715 general election and voted against the Government in 1719 on the repeal of the Occasional Conformity and Schism Acts and the Peerage Bill. He was returned again in 1722 and 1727. He died just before the 1734 general election.

Clarke died unmarried on 14 March 1734. His estates went to his nephew Godfrey Clarke, son of his deceased brother, Gilbert Clarke, of Ulcombe, Kent. The son of this Godfrey Clarke was Godfrey Bagnall Clarke (born about 1742) the last member of the family of Chilcote.

Parliament of Great Britain
Preceded by Thomas Coke; Sir John Curzon	Member of Parliament for Derbyshire; 1710–1734; With: Sir John Curzon; Sir Nathaniel Curzon	Succeeded by Lord Charles Cavendish; Sir Nathaniel Curzon
