= Bryan Benson =

Governor of the Bank of England

- Occupation: Governor of the Bank of England from 1735 to 1737

Bryan Benson was Governor of the Bank of England from 1735 to 1737. He had been Deputy Governor from 1733 to 1735. He replaced Horatio Townshend as Governor and was succeeded by Thomas Cooke.

== See also ==
- Chief Cashier of the Bank of England

Government offices
Preceded by Horatio Townshend	Governor of the Bank of England; 1735–1737	Succeeded by Thomas Cooke
