= Sir John Curzon, 3rd Baronet =

English Tory politician

Sir John Curzon Bt
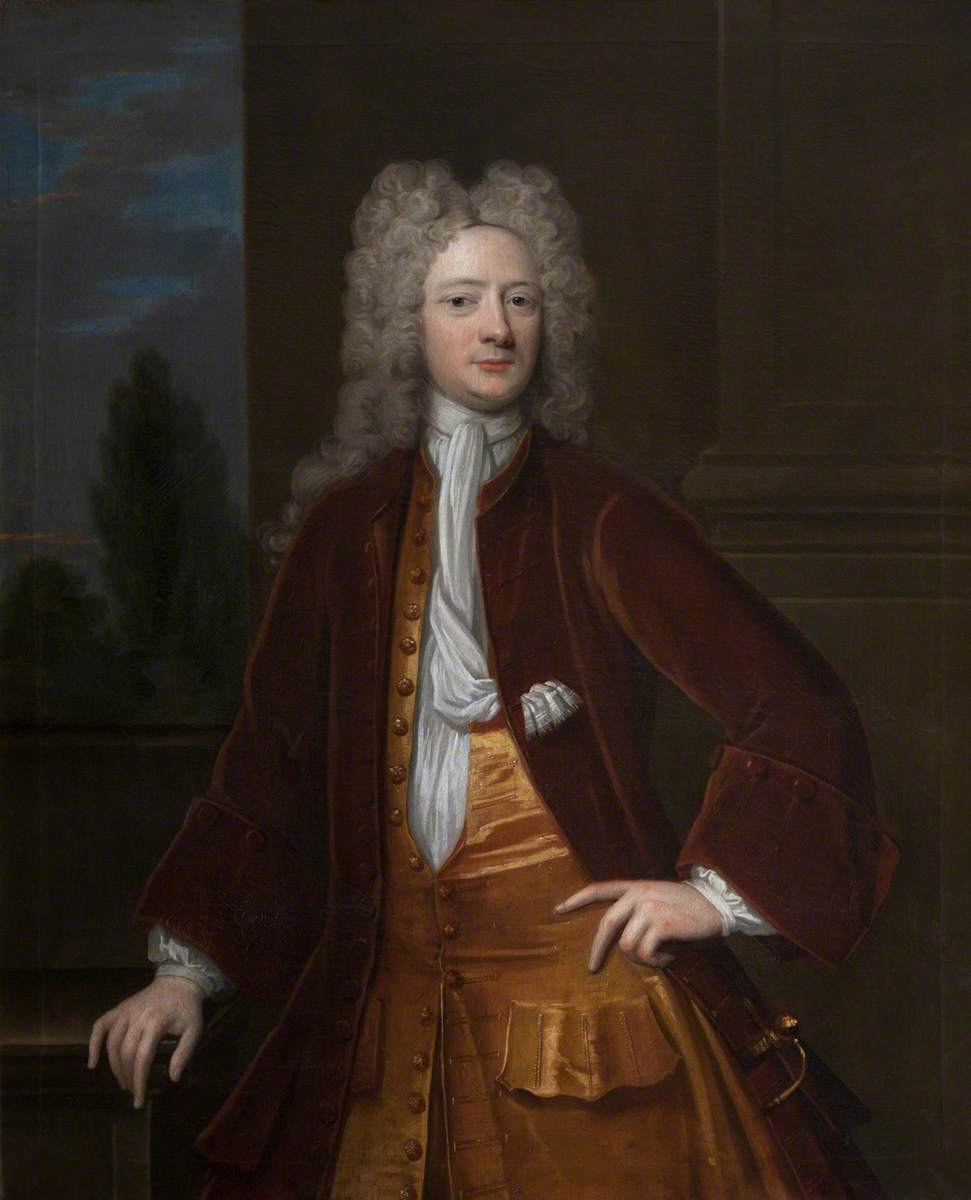
- Portrait from the studio of Godfrey Kneller

Member of Parliament for Derbyshire
- In office 1701–1727 Serving with Thomas Coke (1701–1710); Godfrey Clarke (1710–1727)
- Preceded by: Lord Hartington; Lord Roos
- Succeeded by: Godfrey Clarke; Sir Nathaniel Curzon

Personal details
- Born: c.1674
- Died: 6 August 1727 (aged 52–53)
- Party: Tory
- Education: Trinity College, Oxford

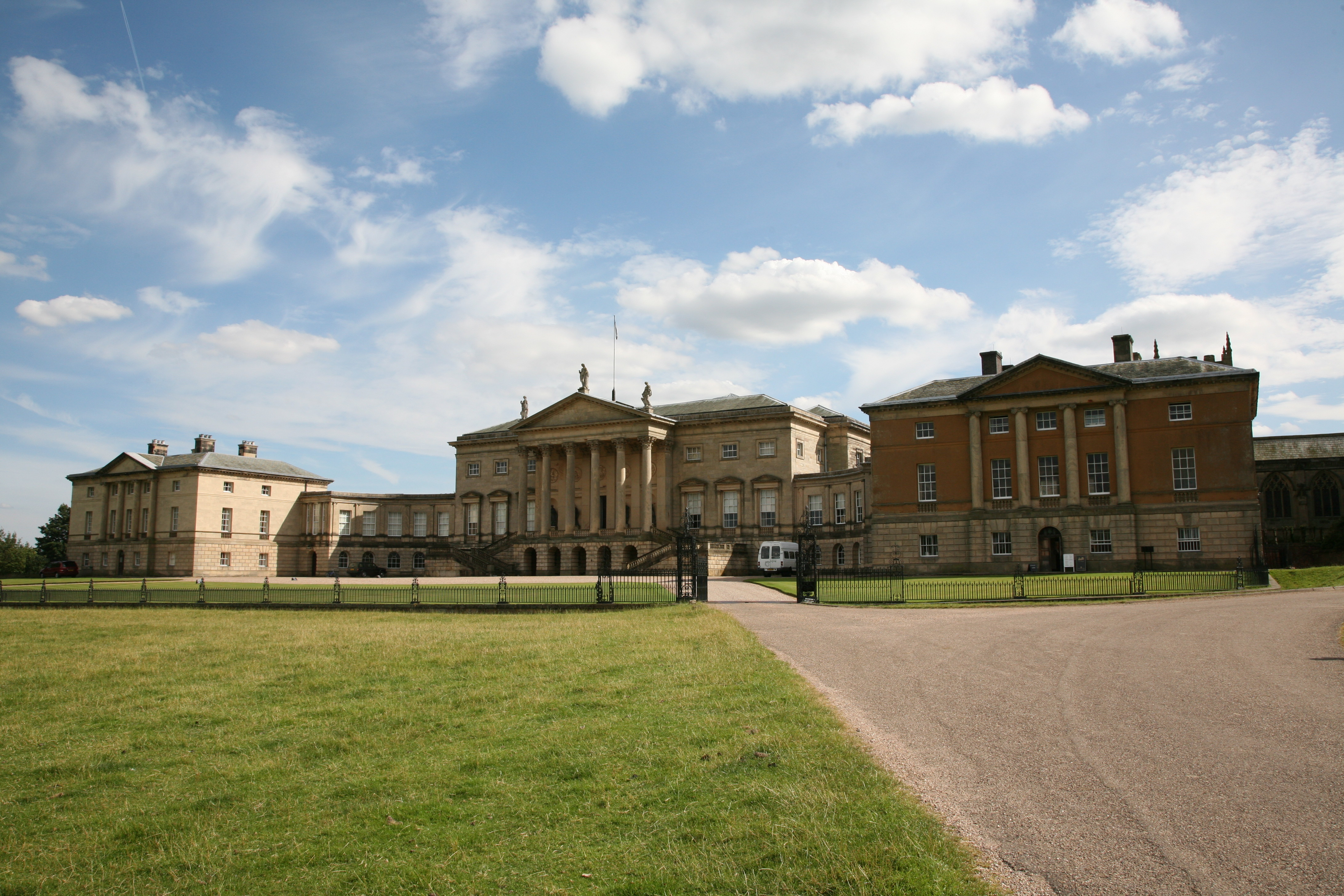
Kedleston Hall, Derbyshire - seat of the Curzon family - as rebuilt in 1759

Sir John Curzon, 3rd Baronet (c.1674 – 6 August 1727), of Kedleston, Derbyshire, was an English Tory politician who sat in the English and British House of Commons for 26 years, between 1701 and 1727.

Curzon was the son of Sir Nathaniel Curzon, 2nd Baronet, and his wife, Sarah Penn, daughter of William Penn of Penn, Buckinghamshire. He matriculated at Trinity College, Oxford, on 8 July 1690, aged 16 and was awarded BA in 1693. He was admitted at Inner Temple in 1692.

Curzon was returned with Thomas Coke in a contest as Member of Parliament for Derbyshire at the second general election of 1701. He was classified as a Tory and was returned with Coke unopposed in the English general elections of 1702 and 1705. At the 1708 British general election, Curzon was returned with Coke again unopposed. His only vote he recorded during that Parliament was against the impeachment of Dr Sacheverell. In June 1710, he presented a loyal address from Derbyshire, which was a calculated snub to Thomas Coke, who though a Tory was surrendering his principles to keep his lucrative public offices. At the 1710 general election Curzon selected a new running mate and Coke went to stand elsewhere. Curzon was more active in this Parliament and was included among the 'Tory patriots' favouring peace, and as a 'worthy patriot' who had helped to detect the mismanagements of the previous ministry. He was also a member of the October Club. At the 1713 election, he was returned unopposed again, but his brother had joined him in the House of Commons, and it is not possible to distinguish their contributions. One of the Curzons was responsible for managing through Parliament a bill for the Trent navigation.

Curzon was returned again at the 1715 election. He succeeded his father in the baronetcy on 4 March 1719. He was returned again at the 1722 election. He died just before the dissolution for the 1727 election.

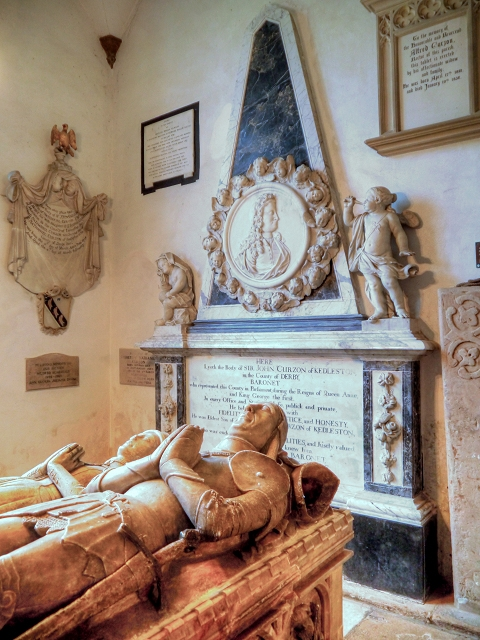
Wall monument to Sir John Curzon, All Saints' Church, Kedleston

Curzon was the first owner of Kedleston Hall to exploit the landscape potential, and commissioned Charles Bridgeman in the 1720s to create formal water features. He died on 7 August 1727 as a consequence of falling from his horse while out hunting three weeks previously and was buried at All Saints' Church, Kedleston. He was unmarried and was therefore succeeded by his brother Nathaniel.

Parliament of England
Preceded by Marquess of Hartington; Lord Roos	Member of Parliament for Derbyshire; 1701–1707; With: Thomas Coke	Succeeded by Parliament of Great Britain
Parliament of Great Britain
Preceded by Parliament of England	Member of Parliament for Derbyshire; 1707–1727; With: Thomas Coke 1707–1710; Godfrey Clarke 1710–1727	Succeeded by Godfrey Clarke; Sir Nathaniel Curzon, Bt
Baronetage of England
Preceded by Nathaniel Curzon	Baronet of Kedleston; 1719–1727	Succeeded by Nathaniel Curzon
Baronetage of Nova Scotia
Preceded by Nathaniel Curzon	Baronet of Kedleston; 1719–1727	Succeeded by Nathaniel Curzon
