= Horatio Townshend =

English banker and politician

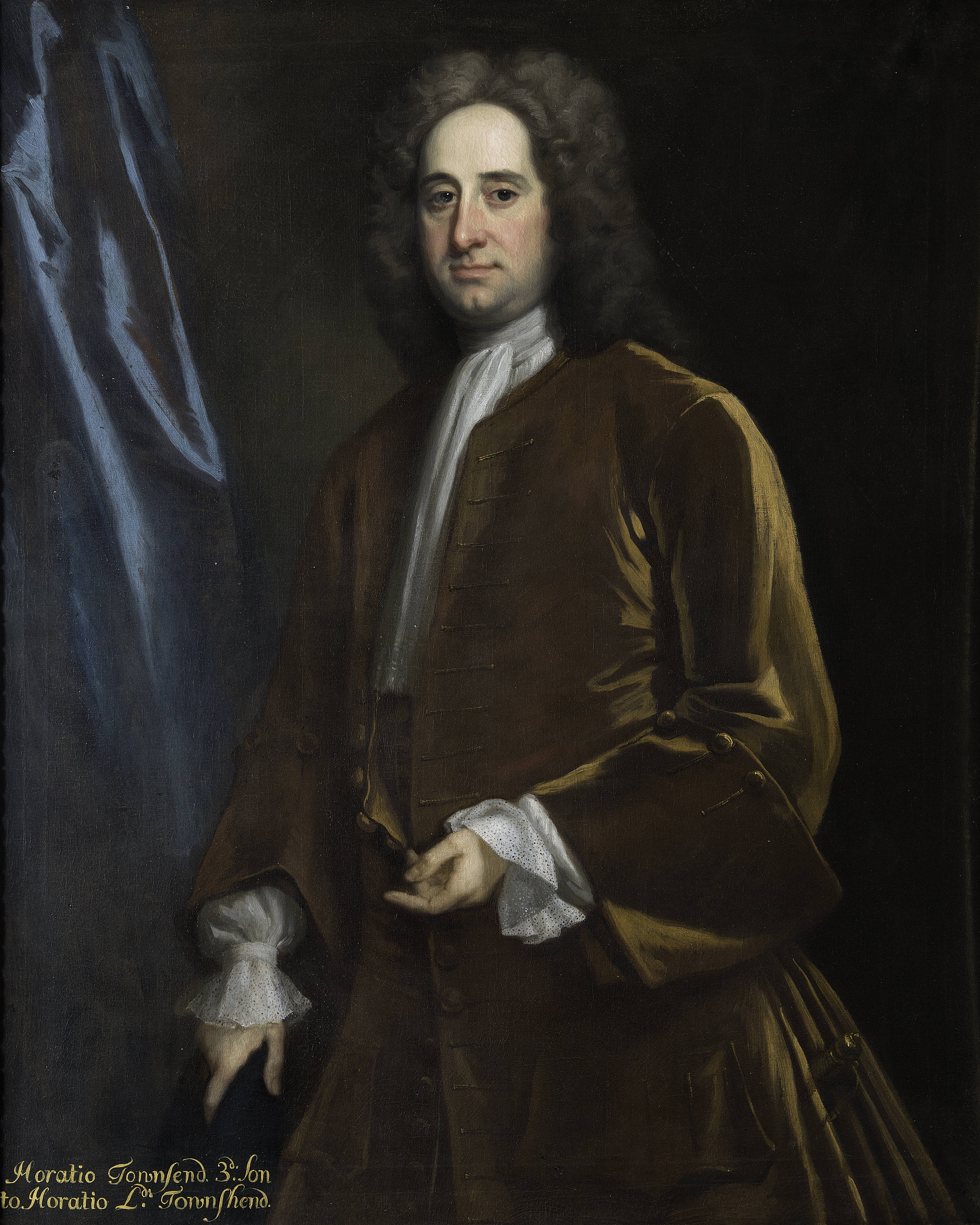
- portrait by Godfrey Kneller
- Born: c. 1683
- Died: 4 October 1751
- Education: Eton College
- Spouse: Alice Starkie
- Children: Letitia Townshend
- Parents: Horatio Townshend, 1st Viscount Townshend (father); Mary Ashe (mother)
- Relatives: Charles Townshend, 2nd Viscount Townshend

Horatio Townshend (c. 1683 – 4 October 1751) was an English banker and politician who sat in the House of Commons between 1715 and 1734.

Townshend was the son of Horatio Townshend, 1st Viscount Townshend and his second wife Mary Ashe, daughter of Sir Joseph Ashe, 1st Baronet, and was educated at Eton College.

Townshend was Member of Parliament for Great Yarmouth from 1715 to 1722, in which year he became a director of the Bank of England. He was then Member of Parliament for Heytesbury from 1727 to 1734.

Townshend was Governor of the Bank of England from 1733 to 1735. He had been Deputy Governor from 1732 to 1733. He replaced Edward Bellamy as Governor and was succeeded by Bryan Benson. He was a Commissioner of the Victualling Board from 1747 to 1765.

He married Alice Starkey in a fleet marriage on 21 April 1721.

He died on 4 October 1751 and was buried at St. George the Martyr Cemetery, Brunswick Square beside his wife Alice (d. 1747) and three of his children, Alice (d. 1726), Mary (d. 1730) and Horatio (d. 1743).

== See also ==
- Chief Cashier of the Bank of England

Parliament of Great Britain
Preceded by George England; Richard Ferrier	Member of Parliament for Great Yarmouth; 1715–1722; With: George England	Succeeded by Hon. Charles Townshend; Horatio Walpole
Preceded by Edward Ashe; Lord Charles Cavendish	Member of Parliament for Heytesbury; 1727–1734; With: Edward Ashe	Succeeded by Edward Ashe; Pierce A'Court-Ashe
Government offices
Preceded by Edward Bellamy	Governor of the Bank of England; 1733–1735	Succeeded by Bryan Benson
