= Charles Abbot, 1st Baron Colchester =

British barrister and politician (1757–1829)

The Right Honourable The Lord Colchester PC FRS
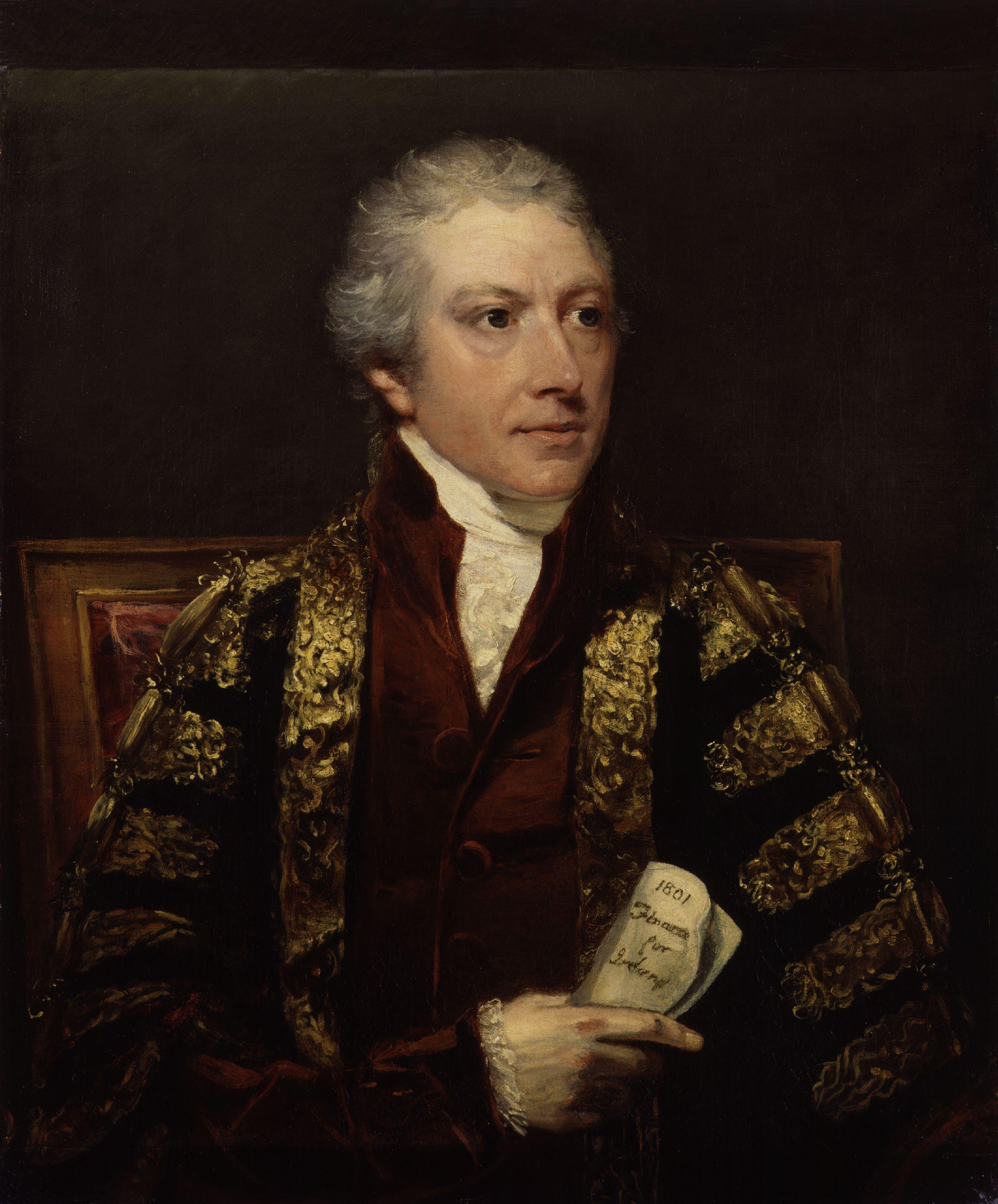
- Portrait by John Hoppner, c. 1802

Speaker of the House of Commons of the United Kingdom
- In office 10 February 1802 – 2 June 1817
- Monarch: George III
- Prime Minister: Henry Addington; William Pitt; William Grenville; William Cavendish-Bentinck; Spencer Perceval; Robert Jenkinson
- Preceded by: Sir John Mitford
- Succeeded by: Charles Manners-Sutton

Personal details
- Born: 14 October 1757 Abingdon
- Died: 8 May 1829 (aged 71)
- Party: Tory
- Spouse(s): Elizabeth Gibbes (1760–1847)
- Children: 2, including Charles
- Education: Christ Church, Oxford

Charles Abbot, 1st Baron Colchester PC, FRS (14 October 1757 – 8 May 1829) was a British barrister and statesman. He served as Speaker of the House of Commons between 1802 and 1817.

== Background and education ==
Abbot was born at Roysse Court, Abingdon, to Dr John Abbot, headmaster of Abingdon School and rector of All Saints, Colchester, and, by his mother's second marriage, step-brother of Jeremy Bentham. From Westminster School he passed to Christ Church, Oxford, where he matriculated on 14 June 1775. There he gained the chancellor's prize for Latin verse as well as the Vinerian Scholarship. He was admitted to the Middle Temple on 14 October 1768 and was called to the Bar on 9 May 1783.

Abbot was granted a BCL in 1783 and a DCL in 1793. On 14 February 1793, he became a Fellow of the Royal Society.

== Legal and political career ==
In 1795, after having practised twelve years as a barrister, and having published a treatise proposing the incorporation of the judicial system of Wales with that of England, he was appointed to the office previously held by his brother of clerk of the rules in the King's Bench; and in June of the same year he was elected Member of Parliament for Helston, through the influence of the Duke of Leeds.

In 1796 Abbot commenced his career as a reformer in Parliament by obtaining the appointment of two committees: one to report on the arrangements which then existed as to temporary laws or laws about to expire; and the other to devise methods for the better publication of new statutes. It was thanks to the work of the latter committee, and of a second committee which he proposed some years later, that copies of new statutes were subsequently routinely sent to all magistrates and municipal bodies. At a local level, he and Henry Richards (the other member returned for Helston) raised 200 guineas for the demolishing and rebuilding of the Helston coinage hall.

Abbot's efforts also effected the establishment of the Record Commission; the reform of the system which had allowed the public money to lie for some time at long interest in the hands of the public accountants, by charging them with payment of interest; and, most important of all, the act for taking the first census of the United Kingdom, that of 1801. On the formation of the Addington ministry in March 1801, Abbot became Chief Secretary for Ireland and also Keeper of the Privy Seal of Ireland. In the February of the following year he was appointed Speaker of the House of Commons: at this point he stood down as Chief Secretary for Ireland, but he remained Keeper of the Privy Seal until his death. He served as Speaker until 1817, when an attack of erysipelas compelled him to retire. The House of Commons Library traces its origins to his time as Speaker. He objected to the Lay College at Maynooth, leading to its suppression in 1814.

In response to an address of the Commons, Abbot was raised to the peerage as Baron Colchester, of Colchester in the County of Essex on 1 June 1817, with a pension of £4,000, of which £3,000 was to be continued to his heir. His speeches against the Roman Catholic claims were published in 1828.

== Family ==
Coat of arms of Charles Abbot, 1st Baron Colchester
Crest Out of a ducal coronet Or, a unicorn's head Ermine maned and tufted of the first between six ostrich feathers Argent quilled Gold. Escutcheon Gules, on a chevron between three pears Or as many crosses raguly Azure within a tressure flory of the second. Supporters On either side a unicorn Ermine maned hoofed and tufted Or, gorged with a collar Azure within another gemel flory counter-flory Gules therefrom a chain reflexed over the back Gold and charged on the shoulder with a cross raguly of the third. Motto Deo Patriae Amicis

In 1796, he had married, in London, Elizabeth Gibbes (1760–1847), the elder daughter of Sir Philip Gibbes, 1st Baronet, of Springhead, Barbados, by whom he had two sons. He was succeeded by his elder son Charles, Postmaster General in 1858, and subsequently by his grandson Reginald Abbot, 3rd Baron Colchester, on whose death in 1919 the title became extinct.

Parliament of Great Britain
Preceded by Sir Gilbert Elliot, Bt; Stephen Lushington	Member of Parliament for Helston; 1795–1800; With: Stephen Lushington 1795–1796; Richard Richards 1796–1799; Lord Francis Osborne 1799–1800	Succeeded by Parliament of the United Kingdom
Parliament of the United Kingdom
Preceded by Parliament of Great Britain	Member of Parliament for Helston; 1801–1802; With: Lord Francis Osborne 1801–1802	Succeeded by Viscount FitzHarris; John Penn
Preceded by Sir John Leicester, Bt; William Wickham	Member of Parliament for Heytesbury; 1802; With: Viscount Kirkwall	Succeeded by Viscount Kirkwall; Charles Moore
Preceded by Sir Henry Dashwood, Bt; Charles Moore	Member of Parliament for Woodstock; 1802–1806; With: Sir Henry Dashwood, Bt	Succeeded by Sir Henry Dashwood, Bt; William Eden
Preceded by Sir William Dolben, Bt; Sir William Scott	Member of Parliament for Oxford University; 1806–1817; With: Sir William Scott	Succeeded by Sir William Scott; Robert Peel
Political offices
Preceded by Viscount Castlereagh	Chief Secretary for Ireland; 1801–1802	Succeeded by William Wickham
Preceded by Sir John Mitford	Speaker of the House of Commons of the United Kingdom; 1802–1817	Succeeded by Charles Manners-Sutton
Peerage of the United Kingdom
New creation	Baron Colchester; 1817–1829	Succeeded by Charles Abbot
