= Edward Bellamy (banker) =

Governor of the Bank of England and Lord Mayor of London (died 1749)

Sir Edward Bellamy
- Died: 1749
- Occupation: Banker

Sir Edward Bellamy (died 1749) was a London banker who was Lord Mayor of London and Governor of the Bank of England

He was a member of the Worshipful Company of Fishmongers and an Alderman of the city from 1723. He was elected Sheriff of London for 1723–24 and Lord Mayor for 1734–35.

He was a Director of the Bank of England from 1723 to 1726 and from 1727 to 1729, serving as Deputy Governor from 1729 to 1731 and as Governor from 1731 to 1733. He replaced Samuel Holden as Governor and was succeeded by Horatio Townshend.

He was an unsuccessful candidate for the City of London Parliamentary seat in the general election of 1741, coming sixth in the poll.

== See also ==
- Chief Cashier of the Bank of England

Government offices
Preceded by Samuel Holden	Governor of the Bank of England; 1731–1733	Succeeded by Horatio Townshend
Civic offices
Preceded by Sir William Billers	Lord Mayor of London; 1734– 1735	Succeeded by Sir John Williams
