= John FitzMaurice, Viscount Kirkwall =

British politician

John Hamilton FitzMaurice, Viscount Kirkwall (9 October 1778 – 23 November 1820), known as John FitzMaurice until 1791, was a British politician.

== Background ==
Kirkwall was the son of the Hon. Thomas FitzMaurice, younger son of John Petty, 1st Earl of Shelburne. His mother was Mary, suo jure Countess of Orkney, daughter of Murrough O'Brien, 1st Marquess of Thomond and Mary, suo jure Countess of Orkney. His father was the Thomas FitzMaurice, 5th Earl of Orkney. The Prime Minister of Great Britain, Lord Shelburne, William Petty FitzMaurice, was his uncle. He gained the courtesy title Viscount Kirkwall when his mother succeeded as Countess of Orkney in 1791.

== Political career ==
Kirkwall was returned to Parliament for Heytesbury in 1802, a seat he held until 1806, and later represented Denbigh Boroughs between 1812 and 1818.

== Family ==
Lord Kirkwall married the Hon. Anna Maria, daughter of John Blaquiere, 1st Baron de Blaquiere, in 1802. He died in November 1820, aged 42, predeceasing his mother by eleven years. His eldest son Thomas later succeeded in the earldom. His second son the Hon. William was a politician. Lady Kirkwall died in January 1843.

== See also ==
- Marquess of Lansdowne
- Earl of Orkney

Parliament of the United Kingdom
Preceded by Sir John Leicester, Bt; William Wickham	Member of Parliament for Heytesbury; 1802–1806; With: Vacant 1802; Charles Moore 1802–1806	Succeeded by Vacant; Sir William à Court, Bt
Preceded by Robert Myddelton Biddulph	Member of Parliament for Denbigh Boroughs; 1812–1818	Succeeded by John Wynne Griffith
