= John Sackville (died 1619) =

English politician

John Sackville (died 1619), of Brede and of Sedlescombe, Sussex, was an English politician.

== Family ==
Sackville was the son of Christopher Sackville, MP.

== Career ==
He was a member (MP) of the parliament of England for East Grinstead in 1563.

Parliament of England
Preceded by Thomas Sackville with Humphrey Llwyd	Member of Parliament for East Grinstead; 1563; With: Lawrence Banester	Succeeded by
