= Erlang, Susong County =

Erlang 二郎镇
- Town
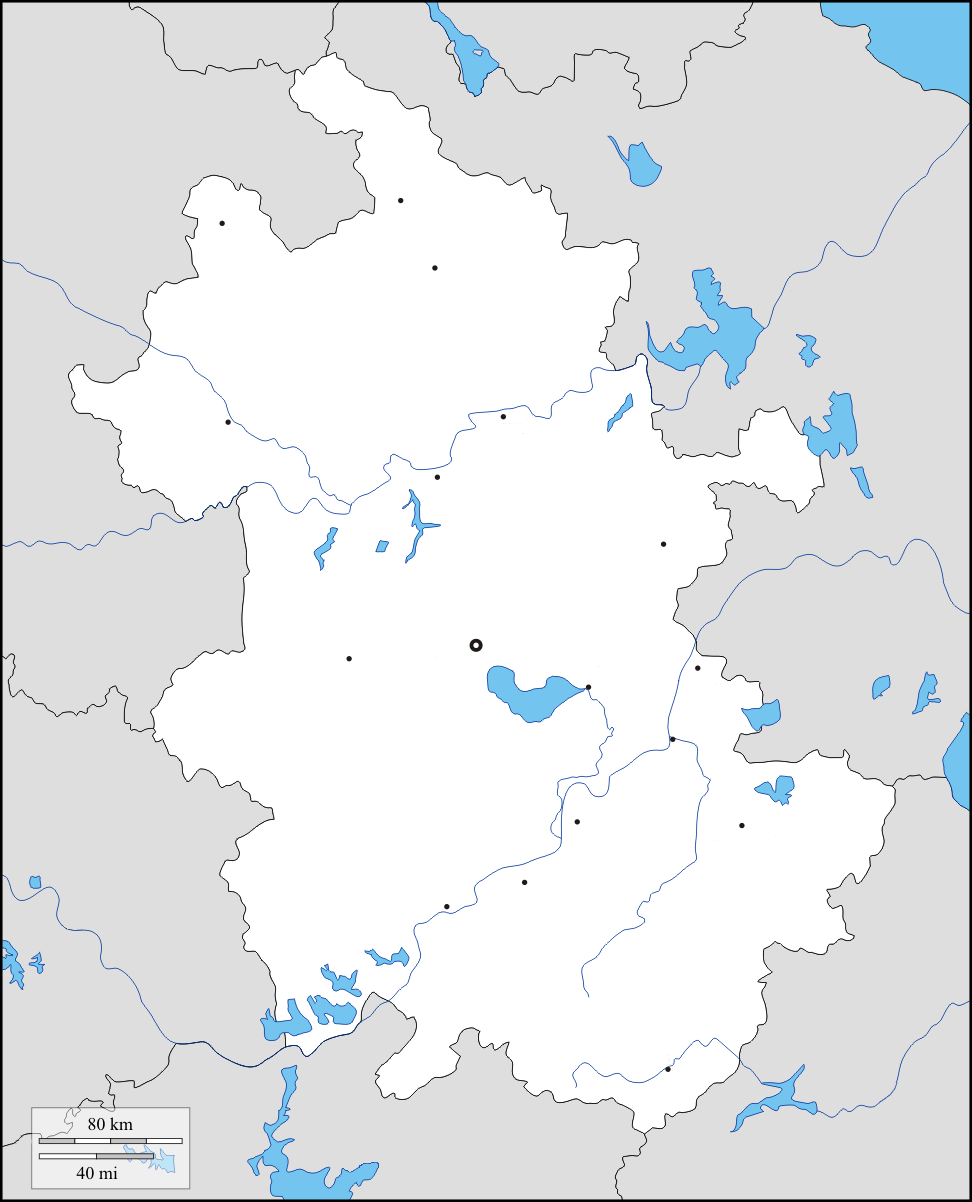
- Location in Anhui Erlang (China)
- Coordinates: 30°16′43″N 116°3′20″E
- Country: People's Republic of China
- Province: Anhui
- Prefecture-level City: Anqing
- County: Susong County
- Time zone: UTC+8 (China Standard)

Erlang (Chinese: 二郎; pinyin: Èrláng) is a town under the administration of Susong County, Anhui, China. As of 2023, it administers Erlang Residential Community and the following seven villages:

- Zhuoling Village (卓岭村)
- Shiju Village (石咀村)
- Fuling Village (茯苓村)
- Liupo Village (刘坡村)
- Tongling Village (铜铃村)
- Sanchong Village (三冲村)
- Jieling Village (界岭村)

== See also ==
- List of township-level divisions of Anhui
