= Thomas Cooke (banker) =

Governor of the Bank of England (1672-1752)

- Born: 1672
- Died: 1752
- Occupation: Banker

Thomas Cooke (1672–1752) was an English merchant and banker. He was Governor of the Bank of England from 1737 to 1740. He had been Deputy Governor from 1735 to 1737. He replaced Bryan Benson as Governor and was succeeded by Delillers Carbonnel.

He married a daughter of Nathaniel Gould (1661–1728), merchant, politician, ship-builder and also Governor of the Bank of England from 1711 to 1713 at the time when the South Sea Company was founded., and Frances, daughter of Sir John Hartopp, 3rd Baronet and granddaughter of Charles Fleetwood.

== See also ==
- Chief Cashier of the Bank of England

Government offices
Preceded by Bryan Benson	Governor of the Bank of England; 1737–1740	Succeeded by Delillers Carbonnel
