= Henry Unton (MP) =

16th-century English politician

Henry Unton or Umpton (c. 1535 – 1555 or later) was an English politician. He has been identified as a stepson of Robert Keilway, brother to Edward Unton and so uncle to Henry Unton the diplomat. In November 1554, he was MP for Heytesbury (UK Parliament constituency).
