= Baron Colchester =

Title in the Peerage of the United Kingdom

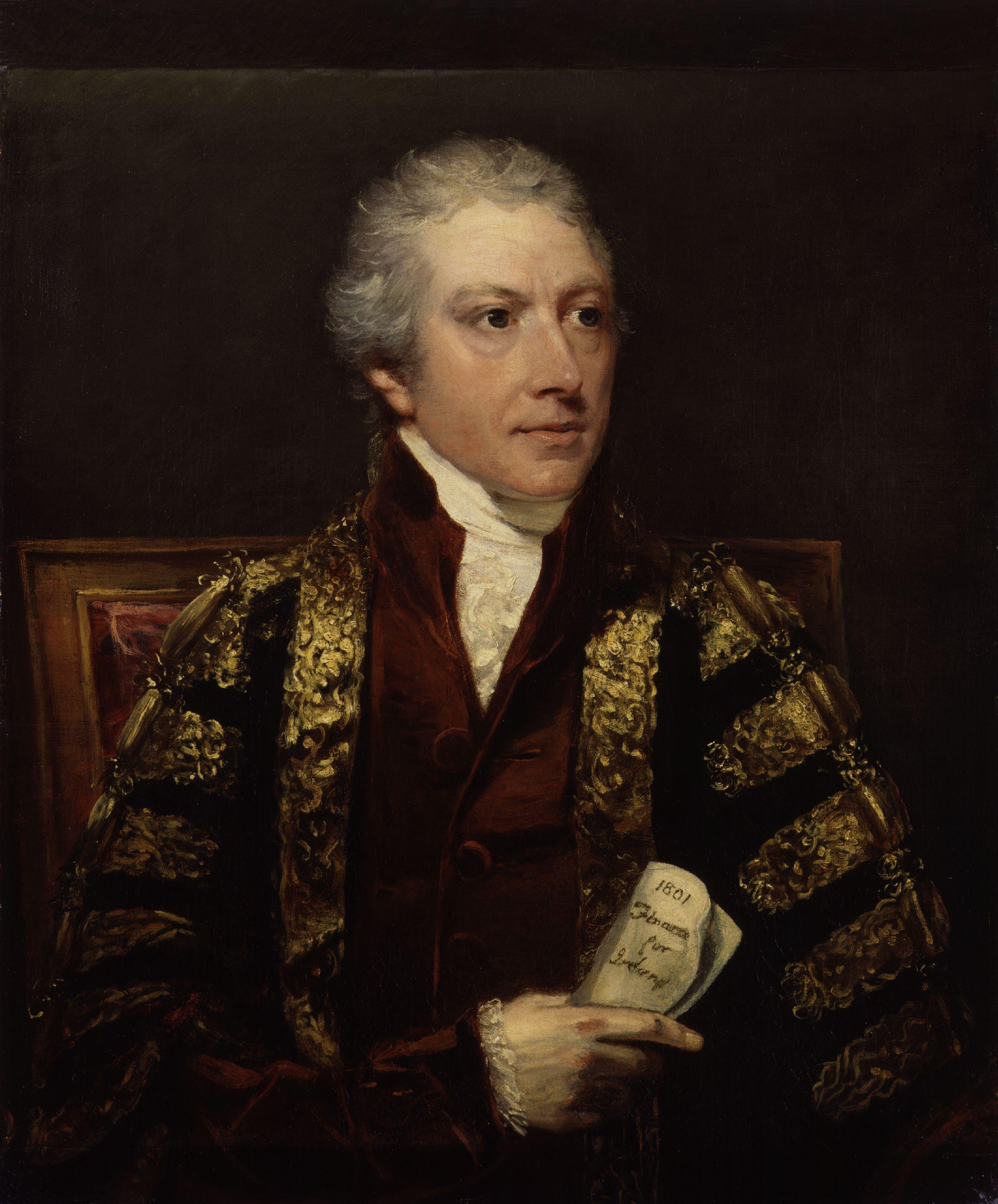
Charles Abbot, 1st Baron Colchester; by John Hoppner.

Baron Colchester, of Colchester in the County of Essex, was a title in the Peerage of the United Kingdom. It was created on 1 June 1817 for Charles Abbot, Speaker of the House of Commons between 1802 and 1817. He was succeeded by his son, the second Baron. He was a naval commander and Conservative politician. His son, the third Baron, was a barrister, President of the Oxford Union and a Charity Commissioner. He was childless and the title became extinct on his death in 1919.

== Barons Colchester (1817) ==
- Charles Abbot, 1st Baron Colchester (1757–1829)
- Charles Abbot, 2nd Baron Colchester (1798–1867)
- Reginald Charles Edward Abbot, 3rd Baron Colchester (1842–1919)

== See also ==
- Viscount Colchester
