= Susong County =

Susong 宿松县 Susung
- County
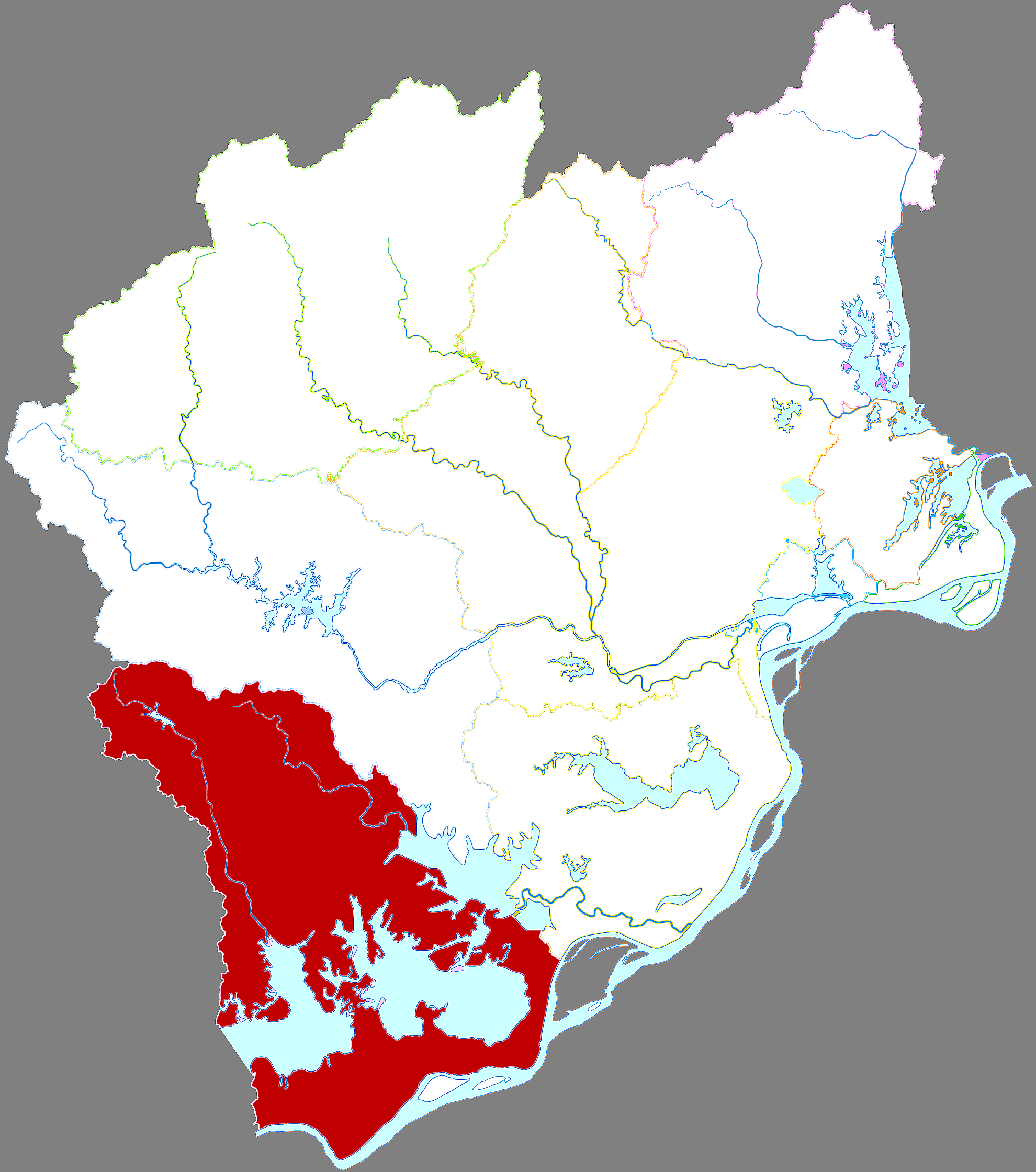
- Susong in Anqing

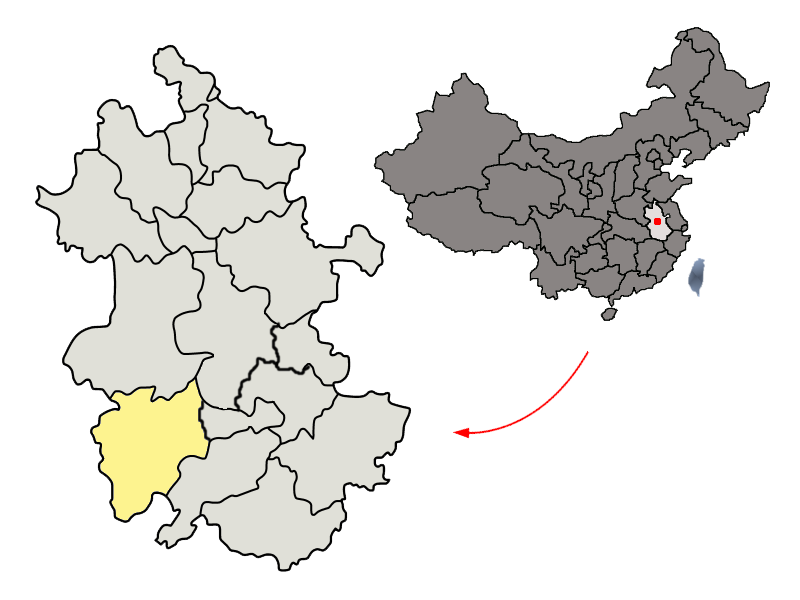
- Anqing in Anhui
- Coordinates: 30°09′14″N 116°07′44″E
- Country: China
- Province: Anhui
- Prefecture-level city: Anqing
- County seat: Fuyu

Area
  - Total: 2,394 km^{2} (924 sq mi)

Population (2020)
  - Total: 612,586
  - Density: 255.9/km^{2} (662.7/sq mi)
- Time zone: UTC+8 (China Standard)
- Postal code: 246500

Susong County (simplified Chinese: 宿松县; traditional Chinese: 宿松縣) is a county in the southwest of Anhui Province, situated on the northwest (left) bank of the Yangtze, bordering the provinces of Hubei to the west and Jiangxi to the south. It is located in the southwest of the jurisdiction of the prefecture-level city of Anqing and is its southernmost county-level division. It has population of 800,000 and an area of 2,394 km^{2} (924 sq mi). The government of Susong County is located in Fuyu Town.

== Administrative divisions ==
Susong County has jurisdiction over 2 subdistricts, 9 towns and 12 townships.

subdistricts

Songzi Subdistrict (松兹街道), Longshan Subdistrict (龙山街道)

towns

- Fuyu (孚玉镇), Fuxing (复兴镇), Huikou (汇口镇), Xuling (许岭镇), Xiacang (下仓镇), Erlang (二郎镇), Huating (凉亭镇), Liangting (凉亭镇), Changpu (长铺镇)

Townships

Gaoling Township (高岭乡), Chengling Township (程岭乡), Jiugu Township (九姑乡), Qianling Township (千岭乡), Zhoutou Township (洲头乡), Zuoba Township (佐坝乡), Beiyu Township (北浴乡), Chenhan Township (陈汉乡), Aikou Township (隘口乡), Liuping Township (柳坪乡), Zhifeng Township (趾凤乡), Heta Township (河塌乡)

== Climate ==
Climate data for Susong, elevation 109 m (358 ft), (1991–2020 normals, extremes 1981–present)
Month	Jan	Feb	Mar	Apr	May	Jun	Jul	Aug	Sep	Oct	Nov	Dec	Year
Record high °C (°F)	21.1 (70.0)	26.5 (79.7)	31.7 (89.1)	32.1 (89.8)	34.7 (94.5)	38.3 (100.9)	39.8 (103.6)	39.6 (103.3)	37.0 (98.6)	33.6 (92.5)	29.0 (84.2)	22.4 (72.3)	39.8 (103.6)
Mean daily maximum °C (°F)	8.3 (46.9)	11.1 (52.0)	15.6 (60.1)	21.9 (71.4)	26.7 (80.1)	29.3 (84.7)	32.6 (90.7)	32.3 (90.1)	28.7 (83.7)	23.6 (74.5)	17.4 (63.3)	10.9 (51.6)	21.5 (70.8)
Daily mean °C (°F)	4.5 (40.1)	7.0 (44.6)	11.2 (52.2)	17.2 (63.0)	22.3 (72.1)	25.4 (77.7)	28.6 (83.5)	28.1 (82.6)	24.3 (75.7)	18.9 (66.0)	12.6 (54.7)	6.7 (44.1)	17.2 (63.0)
Mean daily minimum °C (°F)	1.7 (35.1)	3.8 (38.8)	7.7 (45.9)	13.3 (55.9)	18.5 (65.3)	22.2 (72.0)	25.3 (77.5)	24.9 (76.8)	20.8 (69.4)	15.2 (59.4)	9.0 (48.2)	3.5 (38.3)	13.8 (56.9)
Record low °C (°F)	−7.2 (19.0)	−5.6 (21.9)	−2.7 (27.1)	1.3 (34.3)	9.1 (48.4)	13.8 (56.8)	18.8 (65.8)	17.0 (62.6)	11.9 (53.4)	3.5 (38.3)	−2.9 (26.8)	−11.3 (11.7)	−11.3 (11.7)
Average precipitation mm (inches)	61.5 (2.42)	82.7 (3.26)	125.0 (4.92)	159.7 (6.29)	188.3 (7.41)	248.7 (9.79)	211.0 (8.31)	146.5 (5.77)	82.3 (3.24)	56.1 (2.21)	63.3 (2.49)	40.3 (1.59)	1,465.4 (57.7)
Average precipitation days (≥ 0.1 mm)	11.8	11.7	15.2	13.4	13.7	14.4	11.5	11.5	8.1	7.9	9.6	8.9	137.7
Average snowy days	3.9	2.2	0.6	0	0	0	0	0	0	0	0.2	1.5	8.4
Average relative humidity (%)	74	74	76	75	76	81	80	79	75	71	74	72	76
Mean monthly sunshine hours	90.4	93.4	115.0	142.9	160.0	138.9	204.5	202.9	170.4	155.5	132.5	118.0	1,724.4
Percentage possible sunshine	28	30	31	37	38	33	48	50	47	44	42	37	39
Source: China Meteorological Administration

== Tourism ==
- Little Orphan, a rock in the middle of the Yangtze in the county
