= Delillers Carbonnel =

English banker (1654/69-1747)

- Born: November 1669
- Died: 4 May 1747 (aged 77)
- Occupation: Banker

Delillers Carbonnel (November 1669 – 4 May 1747) was an English banker who was Governor of the Bank of England from 1740 to 1741.

He was born in London, the son of Gillaume Carbonnel, a French Huguenot merchant, and Elizabeth de Lillers.

He was Deputy Governor of the Bank of England from 1738 to 1740, when he replaced Thomas Cooke as governor, being succeeded in 1741 by Stamp Brooksbank.

== See also ==
- Chief Cashier of the Bank of England

Government offices
Preceded by Thomas Cooke	Governor of the Bank of England; 1740–1741	Succeeded by Stamp Brooksbank
