= William Ashe-à Court =

British Army general

General William Ashe-à Court
- Born: c. 1708
- Died: 2 August 1781
- Children: William
- Military career
- Allegiance: Great Britain
- Branch: British Army
- Rank: General
- Conflicts: War of the Austrian Succession
- Other work: Member of Parliament

General William Ashe-à Court (c. 1708 – 2 August 1781) was a senior British Army officer and a Member of Parliament.

Born William à Court, he was the son of Pierce à Court, MP and Elizabeth Ashe of Ivy Church, Wiltshire. His older brother, Pierce A'Court-Ashe, was also an MP.

He joined the British Army as an ensign in the 11th Foot in 1726. He became a cornet in the 4th Dragoons in 1729 and in 1738 a lieutenant and captain in the 2nd Foot Guards, in which regiment he was subsequently promoted captain and lieutenant-colonel in 1745, 2nd major and colonel in 1755, major-general in 1759 and lieutenant-general in 1765. He served in Flanders during the War of the Austrian Succession (1740–48).

He was given the colonelcy of the 11th Foot in 1765, a position he held until his death. He was made full general on 19 March 1778.

He also sat as Member of Parliament for Heytesbury between 1751 and 1781. In 1768 he assumed by Royal licence the additional surname of Ashe in compliance with the will of his uncle, Edward Ashe.

He died in 1781. He had married Annabella Vernon, daughter of Thomas Vernon, in 1746. Their only son William succeeded him as MP for Heytesbury and was created a baronet in 1795. His grandson, also named William, was raised to the peerage as Baron Heytesbury in 1828.

== Notes ==
Parliament of Great Britain
Preceded by Pierce Ashe-à Court; William Ashe	Member of Parliament for Heytesbury; 1751–1781; With: Pierce Ashe-à Court 1751–1768; Charles FitzRoy-Scudamore 1768–1774; William Gordon 1774–1780; William Eden 1780–1781	Succeeded by William Eden; William à Court
Military offices
Preceded by Maurice Bocland	Colonel of the 11th Regiment of Foot; 1765–1781	Succeeded by Francis Smith
