= James Theobald (natural historian) =

British merchant and scientist (1688–1759)

James Theobald FRS FSA
- Born: 1688
- Died: February 20, 1759 (aged 70)

James Theobald FRS (1688 – 20 February 1759) was a British merchant and natural historian, and an influential member of both the Royal Society and the Society of Antiquaries for many years.

== Biography ==
Theobald was born in London in 1688, son of Peter Theobald, a timber merchant and barber-surgeon. He was baptised in Lambeth on 21 June 1688. From 1704 to 1712, he served an apprenticeship with his father as barber-surgeon, and by 1721, he was working in the timber trade. He was in correspondence with Sir Hans Sloane by 1724 sending him, among other things, 'two carps from Norway'. Sloane proposed Theobald as Fellow of the Royal Society, and he was duly elected in November 1725.

== Learned societies ==
Theobald was an active member of the Royal Society, proposing more than 30 Fellows during the rest of his life. He also served on the Council of the Royal Society from 1728–1737, and again from 1739–1741 and in 1743. He also acted as auditor on numerous occasions. In 1726, he became a Fellow of the Society of Antiquaries, having been proposed by Johann Caspar Scheuchzer.

Later in life, Theobald was a Director of the Bank of England (1743–1756), Master of the Barber-Surgeons company (1750) and governor of the Merchant seaman's corporation. In 1753, Theobald became involved with the new 'Society for the Encouragement of Arts, Manufactures and Commerce', which was soon known as the Society of Arts. Theobald become Vice-President, and wrote a manuscript history of the Society of Arts, which he presented to the Society of Antiquaries in 1759.

Theobald died in London on 20 February 1759. His collection of 'shells, fossils, pictures, specimens of penmanship, coins and medals in gold, silver and brass, and various other articles' was sold by auction in Covent Garden in June 1768.
