= Pierce A'Court-Ashe =

British Member of Parliament (died 1768)

Pierce A'Court Ashe (c. 1707–1768), of Ivy Church and Heytesbury, Wiltshire, was a British Whig politician who sat in the House of Commons from 1734 to 1768.

A'Court was the eldest son of Pierce A'Court, MP, of Ivy Church and his wife Elizabeth Ashe, daughter of William Ashe, MP, of Heytesbury, Wiltshire. His younger brother was William Ashe-à Court, also an MP. He succeeded to his father’s estates on 13 April 1725. He matriculated at Wadham College, Oxford on 17 July 1725, aged 18. At unknown date, he married Janet Brown, daughter of Colonel Robert Brown.

At the 1734 British general election, A'Court was brought in unopposed as a Whig Member of Parliament for Heytesbury on the family interest by his uncle Edward Ashe. He voted for the Administration in all recorded divisions. In July 1739, he was appointed Equerry to the King. He was returned unopposed again in 1741 and 1747 . In 1750 he succeeded to the estates of his cousin William Ashe, MP and acquired the electoral interest for the borough. He then took the additional name of Ashe. In the summer of 1753 he was granted a pension of £500 p.a. from the secret service fund, which he sometimes did not trouble to draw.

A'Court Ashe was returned for Heytesbury in a contest at the 1754 British general election and was listed for the Government. He was returned unopposed again at the 1761 British general election, His pension ceased in 1762 when he and his brother William A’Court remained with Newcastle in opposition. He did not stand in 1768.

A'Court Ashe died without issue on 6 September 1768, as a result of variolation for smallpox.

Parliament of Great Britain
Preceded by Horatio Townshend; Edward Ashe	Member of Parliament for Heytesbury; 1734–1768; With: Edward Ashe; William Ashe; William A'Court	Succeeded by Charles FitzRoy-Scudamore; William A'Court
