= William Cavendish, 2nd Duke of Devonshire =

British nobleman and politician (1672–1729)

His Grace The Duke of Devonshire KG PC
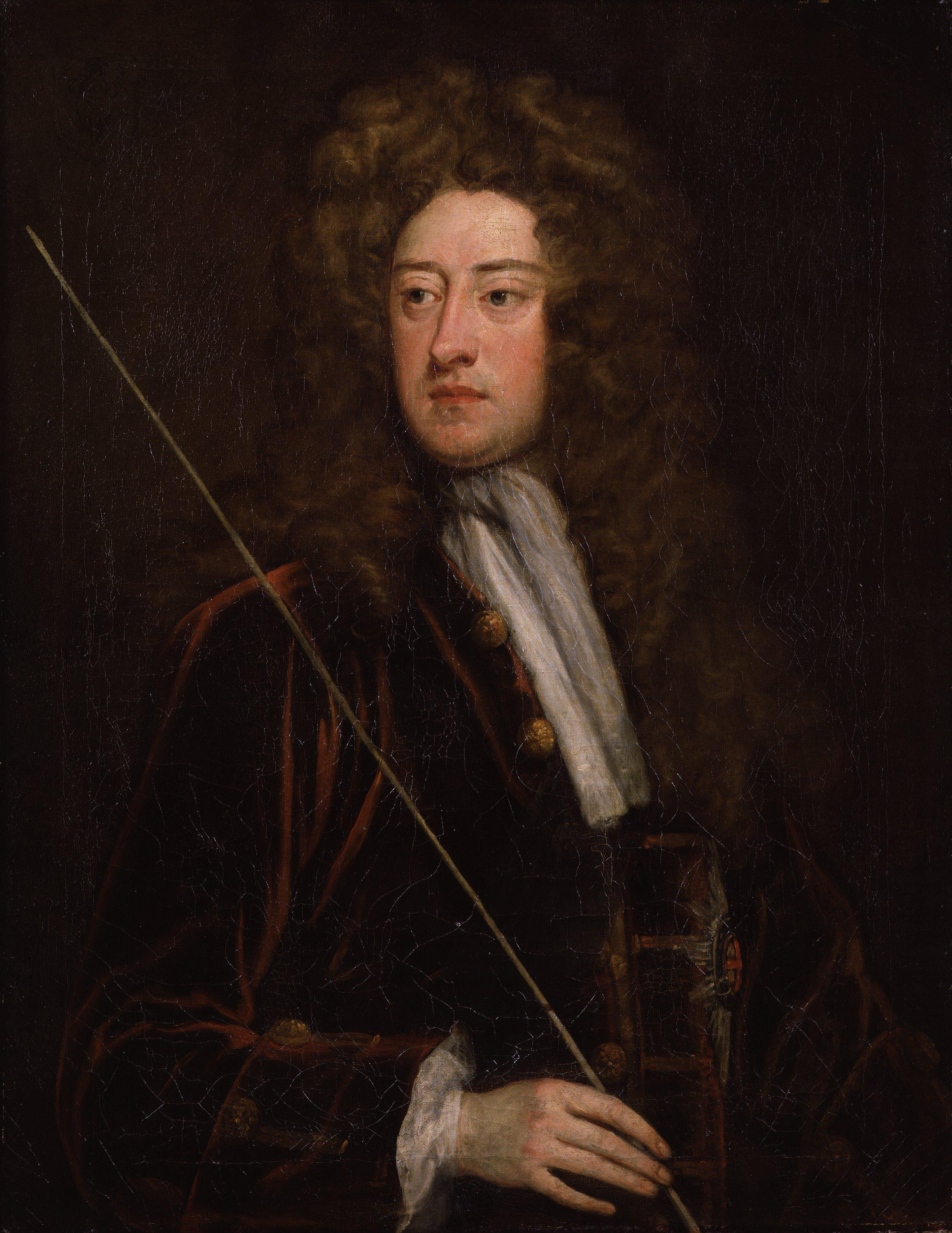
- Portrait by Godfrey Kneller

Lord President of the Council
- In office 6 July 1716 – 16 March 1718
- Monarch: George I
- Preceded by: The Earl of Nottingham
- Succeeded by: The Earl of Sunderland
- In office 27 March 1725 – 4 June 1729
- Monarchs: George I George II
- Preceded by: The Lord Carleton
- Succeeded by: The Lord Trevor

Personal details
- Born: 1672
- Died: 4 June 1729 (aged 56–57)
- Party: Whig
- Spouse: Rachel Russell
- Children: William Cavendish, 3rd Duke of Devonshire; Lady Rachel Cavendish; Lady Elizabeth Cavendish; Lord James Cavendish; Lord Charles Cavendish
- Parent(s): William Cavendish, 1st Duke of Devonshire; Lady Mary Butler

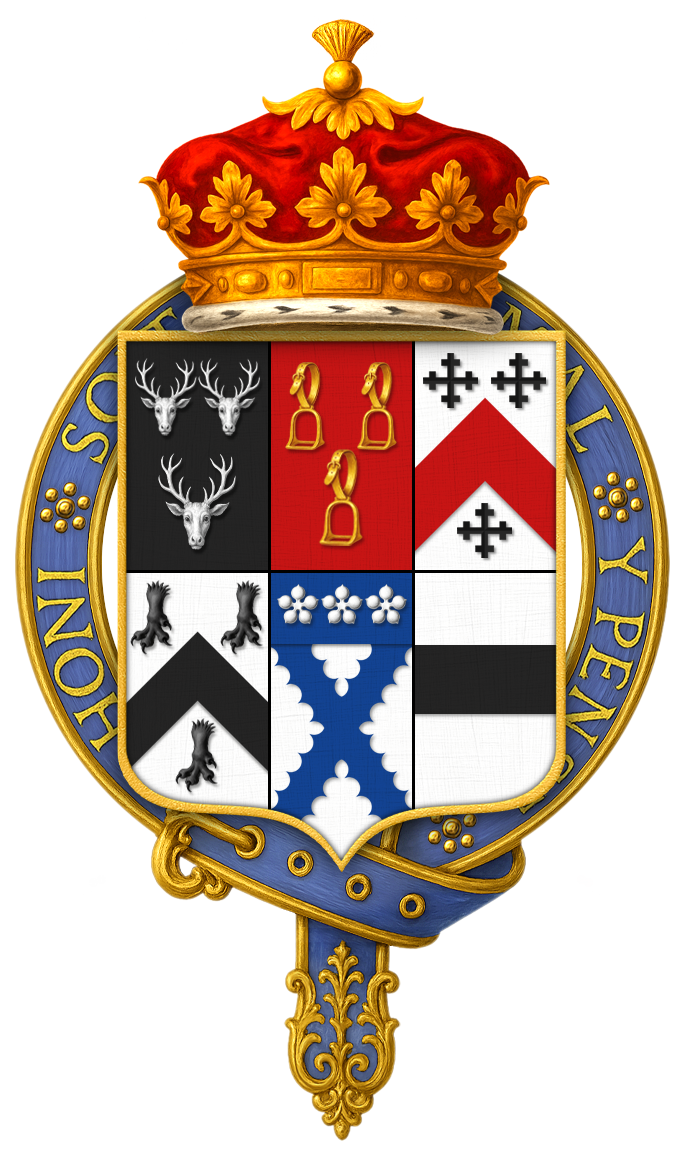
Quartered arms of William Cavendish, 2nd Duke of Devonshire, KG

William Cavendish, 2nd Duke of Devonshire (1672 – 4 June 1729), was a British nobleman and politician. He was the eldest son of William Cavendish, 1st Duke of Devonshire, and Lady Mary Butler. A prominent Whig, he was sworn of the Privy Council in 1707, and served as Lord President of the Council from 1716 to 1718 and from 1725 to 1729.

== Biography ==
Cavendish was born as the eldest surviving son of William Cavendish, 1st Duke of Devonshire. After marrying the daughter of Whig martyr Lord Russell, Rachel Russell, Cavendish was sent out to the country, probably commanding his father's troop of cavalry, and was a volunteer in Flanders in 1692. His first attempt at entering politics was by competing in a by-election in 1691 for the House of Commons, which did not succeed. However, in 1695, he did manage to enter the House of Commons representing the county of Derbyshire.

== Horse racing ==
Cavendish was significant in horse racing. He was the owner of Flying Childers, who is often considered the first true great racehorse in the history of thoroughbreds. Childers was also the son of Darley Arabian, which was one of the first three horses that led to the creation of the English thoroughbred. Cavendish intended to use Childers as a hunter for practical field use after buying him from Colonel Leonard Childers as a yearling, before eventually becoming putting him in racing and him becoming the leading sire in Great Britain and Ireland. However, Childers was not a great breeder, and instead, his brother Bartlett's Childers, who was unsuitable for racing, was bred, leading to Bartlett being the male ancestor of Eclipse.

== Personal life ==
He married the Hon. Rachel Russell (1674–1725), daughter of William Russell, Lord Russell, on 21 June 1688. She served as a Lady of the Bedchamber at the court of Queen Anne.

They had ten children:

1. Lady Mary Cavendish (18 August 1696 – 15 June 1719)
2. William Cavendish, 3rd Duke of Devonshire (26 September 1698 – 5 December 1755)
3. Lady Rachel Cavendish (4 October 1699 – 18 June 1780) married Sir William Morgan on 14 May 1723
4. Lady Elizabeth Cavendish (27 September 1700 – 7 November 1747) married Sir Thomas Lowther, 2nd Baronet
5. Lord James Cavendish (23 November 1701 – 14 December 1741)
6. Lord Charles Cavendish (17 March 1704 – 28 April 1783) married Anne Grey on 9 January 1727, father of Henry Cavendish
7. Lady Anne Cavendish (died 23 August 1780 aged 70)
8. Lady Katherine Cavendish (died 12 September 1715 aged 9)
9. Lord John Cavendish (died 11 May 1720 aged 12)
10. Lady Diana Cavendish (died 12 February 1722)

Parliament of England
Preceded by Sir Gilbert Clarke; Henry Gilbert	Member of Parliament for Derbyshire; 1695–1701; With: Sir Gilbert Clarke 1695–1698; Thomas Coke 1698–1701; Lord Manners of Haddon 1701	Succeeded by Thomas Coke; Sir John Curzon, Bt
Preceded by Robert Walpole; The Earl of Ranelagh	Member of Parliament for Castle Rising; 1702; With: Robert Walpole	Succeeded by Sir Thomas Littleton, Bt; Horatio Walpole
Preceded by The Lord Fairfax of Cameron; The Viscount of Irvine	Member of Parliament for Yorkshire; 1702–1707; With: Sir John Kaye, Bt 1702–1707; The Lord Fairfax of Cameron 1707	Succeeded by The Viscount Downe; Conyers Darcy
Political offices
Preceded by The Earl of Manchester	Captain of the Yeomen of the Guard; 1702–1707	Succeeded by The Viscount Townshend
Preceded by The Duke of Devonshire	Lord Steward; 1707–1710	Succeeded by The Duke of Buckingham and Normanby
Preceded by The Earl Poulett	Lord Steward; 1714–1716	Succeeded by The Duke of Kent
Preceded by The Earl of Nottingham	Lord President of the Council; 1716–1718	Succeeded by The Earl of Sunderland
Preceded by The Lord Carleton	Lord President of the Council; 1725–1729	Succeeded by The Lord Trevor
Honorary titles
Preceded by The Duke of Devonshire	Lord Lieutenant of Derbyshire; 1707–1710	Succeeded by The Earl of Scarsdale
Preceded by The Earl of Scarsdale	Lord Lieutenant of Derbyshire; 1714–1729	Succeeded by The Duke of Devonshire
Legal offices
Preceded by The Duke of Devonshire	Justice in Eyre north of the Trent; 1707–1711	Succeeded by The Duke of Newcastle
Peerage of England
Preceded by William Cavendish	Duke of Devonshire; 1707–1729	Succeeded by William Cavendish
