= John Flavel (logician) =

English logician

John Flavel (1596–1617) was an English logician.

== Life ==
Flavel was born in 1596 at Bishop's Lydeard, Somerset, England, where his father was a clergyman. He matriculated on 25 January 1611 at Trinity College, Oxford, and developed a turn for logical disputation. In 1613 he was made one of the first scholars of Wadham College. He graduated B.A. on 28 June 1614, and lectured on logic. Proceeding M.A. on 23 June 1617, he was in the same year chosen professor of grammar. He had skill in Greek and Latin verse. He died on 10 November 1617, and was buried in Wadham College chapel.

== Works ==
After Flavel's death, Alexander Huish of Wadham edited from his manuscript a logical treatise, with the title Tractatus de Demonstratione Methodicus et Polemicus, &c., Oxford, 1619. The treatise, which is in four books, was not intended for publication. Huish dedicated it (1 March 1619) to Arthur Lake, bishop of Bath and Wells.

Anthony Wood mentions Grammat. Græc. Enchyridion by a Joh. Flavell.
