= Little Orphan =

Hill in the Yangtze River in Anhui, China

Coordinates: 29.9285°N 116.5545°E

- Simplified Chinese: 小孤山
- Traditional Chinese: 小孤山
Transcriptions
Standard Mandarin
- Hanyu Pinyin: Xiǎo gūshān

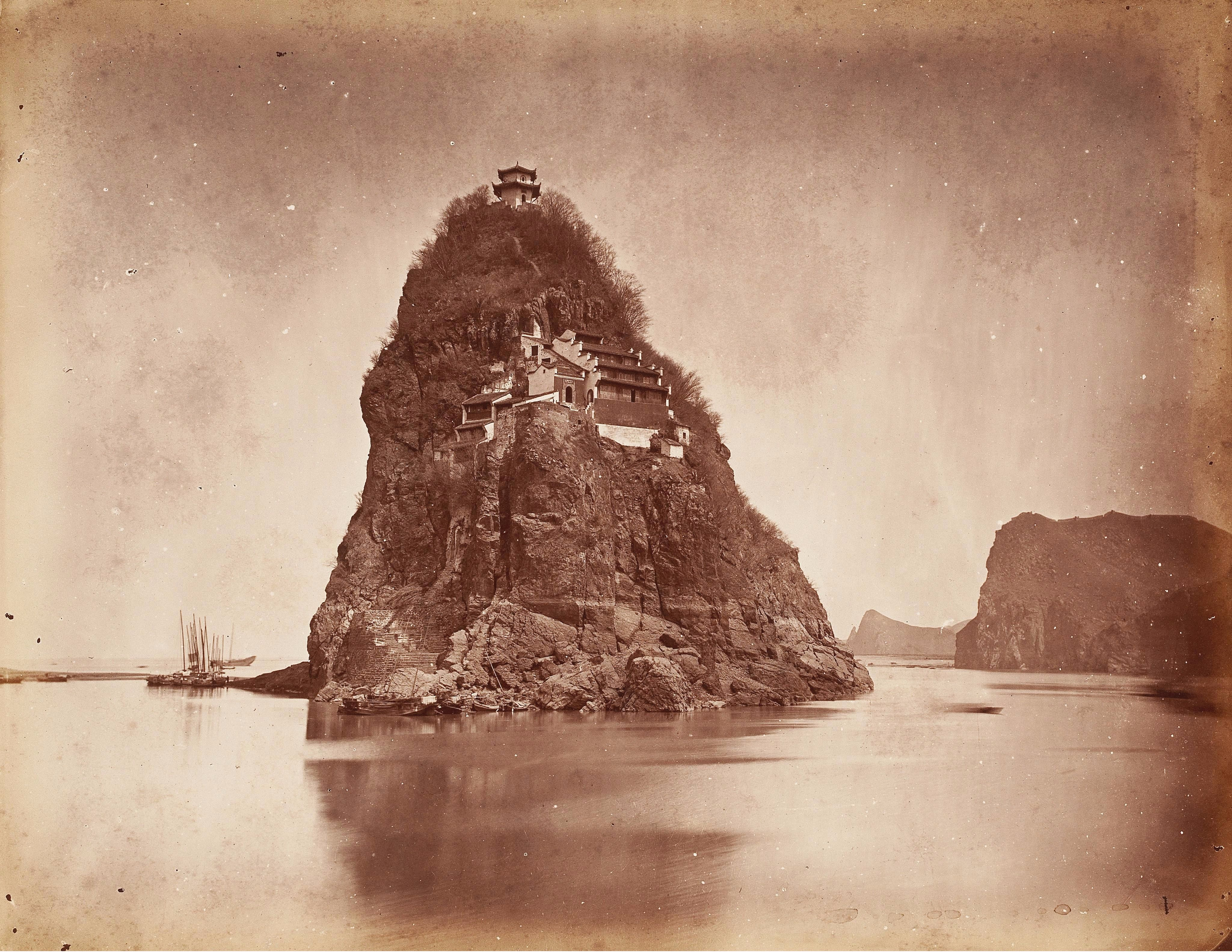
Little Orphan, Yangtze China by William Saunders (1870s)

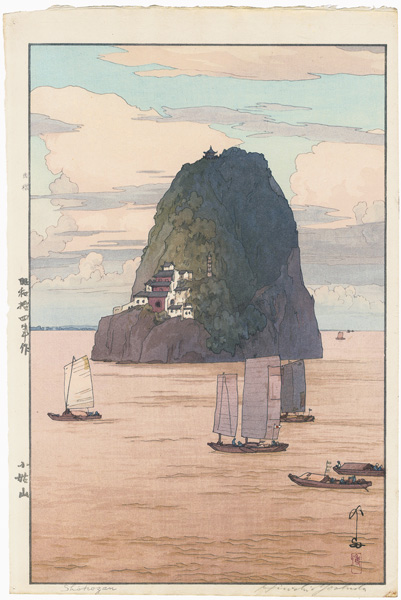
Little Orphan by Yoshida Hiroshi in 1939

Little Orphan is a rock hill in the middle of the Yangtze River, located on Susong, Anqing, Anhui province in East China. It is a landmark that frequently written and photographed by many Western travelers along the Yangtze in the second half of the 19th century and the first half of the 20th century. It formed during the quaternary glaciation. The hill is 78 meters above sea level. During the dry season, it would connect with the north bank of the Yangtze and become a peninsula. There is a Buddhist monastery (also a Mazu temple) on the mountainside and a pavilion on the top of the hill. Its name suggests that it stands alone in the river. "Little" makes it different from "Great Orphan" in Poyang Lake. It is classified as an AAA-rated tourist attraction by China National Tourism Administration, attracting tens of thousands tourists and pilgrims every year. Little Orphan has been a frequent subject in the Chinese classic literature, and one travels depicting Little Orphan written by Lu You is selected for the textbook of high school. It appears on the 2016 Chinese film Crosscurrent.
