= Rachel Cavendish, Duchess of Devonshire =

British noblewoman, wife of William Cavendish, 2nd Duke of Devonshire

Her Grace The Duchess of Devonshire
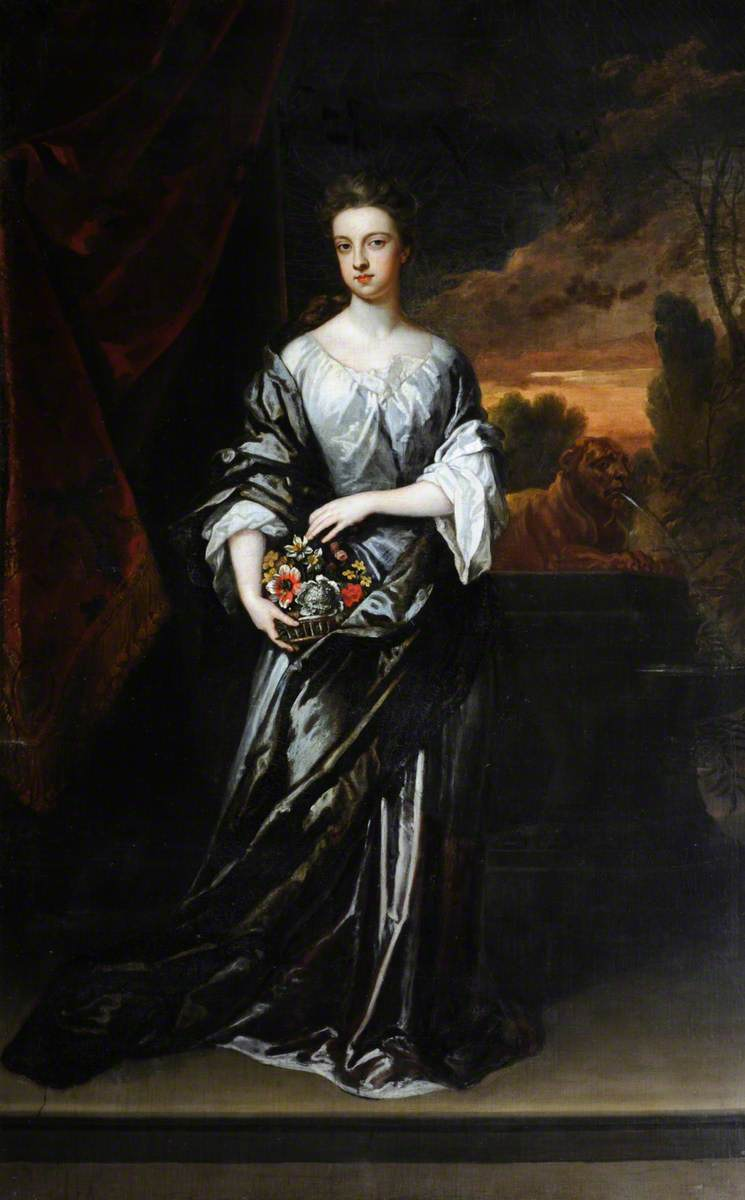
- Portrait by Godfrey Kneller, c. 1692, in the National Trust collection at Hardwick Hall
- Born: Rachel Russell; 1674
- Died: 1725 (aged 50–51)
- Spouse: William Cavendish (m. 1688)
- Issue: 10, including William, James and Charles
- Father: William Russell
- Mother: Rachel Wriothesley

Rachel Cavendish, Duchess of Devonshire (née Russell; 1674–1725), was a British noblewoman and the wife of William Cavendish, 2nd Duke of Devonshire.

== Biography ==
Rachel Russell was born in 1674, the daughter of William Russell, Lord Russell, and his wife Rachel (née Wriothesley). In 1683, Russell's father was executed for treason for his alleged role in the Rye House Plot.

In 1688, Russell married William Cavendish, Marquess of Hartington, heir apparent to the Dukedom of Devonshire. Under her courtesy title Marchioness of Hartington, Cavendish was made a Lady of the Bedchamber to Queen Anne in 1702. She died in 1725.

The Duke and Duchess of Devonshire had ten children:

1. Lady Mary Cavendish (18 August 1696 – 15 June 1719)
2. William Cavendish, 3rd Duke of Devonshire (26 September 1698 – 5 December 1755)
3. Lady Rachel Cavendish (4 October 1699 – 18 June 1780) married Sir William Morgan on 14 May 1723
4. Lady Elizabeth Cavendish (27 September 1700 – 7 November 1747) married Sir Thomas Lowther, 2nd Baronet
5. Lord James Cavendish (23 November 1701 – 14 December 1741)
6. Lord Charles Cavendish (17 March 1704 – 28 April 1783) married Anne Grey on 9 January 1727, father of Henry Cavendish
7. Lady Anne Cavendish (died 23 August 1780 aged 70)
8. Lady Katherine Cavendish (died 12 September 1715 aged 9)
9. Lord John Cavendish (died 11 May 1720 aged 12)
10. Lady Diana Cavendish (died 12 February 1722)
