= Robert Seymour (MP) =

16th-century English politician

Robert Seymour (ca. 1480–1545), of Ivy Church, Wiltshire and London, was an English politician.

He was a member (MP) of the parliament of England for Heytesbury in 1529.
