= Robert Pierce (physician) =

English physician

- Born: 1622; Somerset
- Died: June 1710 (aged 87–88)
- Occupation: Physician

Robert Pierce, also spelt Peirce, (1622 – June 1710) was an English physician.

== Biography ==
Pierce was the son of a clergyman in Somerset. He was born in that county in 1622. After attendance at a preparatory school at Bath, he was sent to Winchester, and thence to Lincoln College, Oxford, where he matriculated on 26 October 1638. He graduated B.A. on 15 June 1642, M.A. and M.B. on 21 October 1650, and M.D. on 12 September 1661. His boyhood and youth were sickly, for at ten he had general dropsy, at twelve smallpox, at fourteen tertian ague, and at twenty-one measles with profuse bleeding from the nose. After a short residence in Bristol he settled in practice in a marshy part of Somerset, where in 1652 he had a severe fever, then epidemic, followed by a quartan ague, which weakened him so much that he decided to leave the district. His fellow-collegian, Dr. Christopher Bennet, advised him to try London; but, though there were then three physicians in full practice at Bath, he decided to settle there in 1653, and soon had what was then called ‘a riding practice,’ or frequent calls to consultations at from ten to thirty miles from Bath. On 15 April 1660 he was elected to the office of physician to poor strangers. As the older physicians died off he gradually became a regular Bath physician, often, as was then the custom, taking patients of distinction to reside in his house. Richard Talbot, earl of Tyrconnel, stayed with him for five weeks from April 1686, and was given Quercetanus's tartar pills for several nights, followed by two quarts of the King's Bath water in the morning for several days, as severe measures were needed to fit him within two or three months to take up his Irish government. The Duke of Hamilton, the Duchess of Ormonde, the Marchioness of Antrim, Lord Stafford, and General Talmash or Tollemache, afterwards mortally wounded at Brest, were among his patients, and he cured Captain Harrison, son-in-law of Bishop Jeremy Taylor, of lead palsy. Sir Charles Scarborough, Sir William Wetherby, Sir John Micklethwaite, Dr. Phineas Fowke, Dr. Gideon Harvey, Dr. Richard Lower, Dr. Short, and many other famous physicians sent patients to him. In 1689 he visited London, and, having been nominated in James II's new charter to the College of Physicians, was admitted a fellow on 19 March 1689. He had earned this honour by many original observations. He is probably the first English writer who noted the now well-known occurrence of acute rheumatism as a sequel to scarlet fever (History of the Bath, p. 12); and his account of Major Arnot's case (p. 45), in which muscular feebleness of the arm followed the constant carrying of a heavy falcon on one fist, is the first suggestion of the morbid conditions now described as ‘trade palsies.’ The lympho-sarcoma of the pericardium, which he discovered post mortem in the case of Sir Robert Craven, is the first described in any English medical book. These three original observations entitle him to a high place among English physicians, and his book contains many others of great interest. In 1697 he published ‘Bath Memoirs, or Observations in three-and-forty years' practice at the Bath,’ of which a second edition appeared in 1713 as ‘The History and Memoirs of the Bath.’ He died in June 1710.

Pierce married a daughter of David Pryme of Wookey, Somerset, and had one daughter, who had an only son, born in 1679.
