= John Ashe (of Freshford) =

English clothier and politician

John Ashe (23 October 1597– 9 February 1659) was an English clothier and politician who sat in the House of Commons at various times between 1640 and 1659.

== Life ==
Ashe was the son of James Ashe of Westcombe, Batcombe, Somerset and his wife Grace Pitt, daughter of Richard Pitt of Melcombe Regis. He entered the cloth trade and became on the "greatest clothier in his time". He came to the attention of the church authorities in the 1630s, associated with the "Beckington riots" against Alexander Huish, and the distribution of Puritan literature. He spent time in jail as an opponent of the ritualist side of Laudianism. In fact Ashe was important in distributing widely the News from Ipswitch of William Prynne, with Rice Boye.

In April 1640, Ashe was elected Member of Parliament for Westbury in the Short Parliament. He was re-elected MP for Westbury for the Long Parliament in November 1640. During the Commonwealth, Ashe received much favour from Oliver Cromwell, but could not be persuaded to be one of the king's judges.

Ashe pioneered new techniques in textile manufacturing and in 1650 brought Dutch technicians to Freshford to teach new methods to perfect the Spanish warp. By this innovation, the amount of cloth produced from an amount of wool was doubled, and Ashe profited accordingly. He was elected MP for Somerset in 1654 for the First Protectorate Parliament and in 1656 for the Second Protectorate Parliament. On 19 January 1657, John Ashe proposed an amendment to the Speaker's debate congratulating Cromwell on surviving an assassination attempt and adding a hope that Cromwell "take upon him the government according to the ancient constitution", by which he intended the Crown. In 1658 he was elected MP for Heytesbury to the Third Protectorate Parliament.

Ashe died at the age of 61 leaving a landed estate valued at £6000 a year.

== Family ==
Ashe married Elizabeth Davison, daughter of Henry Davison of Freshford and his wife Anne Chivers of Quemerford, Wiltshire, and had a family. He was the brother of Edward Ashe MP for Heytesbury. His daughter Grace married the clothier Paul Methuen (1613–1667).

Parliament of England
Vacant Parliament suspended since 1629	Member of Parliament for Westbury; 1640–1652; With: Sir Thomas Penyston, 1st Baronet 1640; Sir William Wheler, 1st Baronet 1640–1648	Not represented in Barebones Parliament
Preceded by General-at-sea Robert Blake; John Pine; Dennis Hollister; Henry Henley	Member of Parliament for Somerset; 1654–1656; With: John Buckland; General John Desborough; John Harrington; Robert Long; Sir John Horner 1654; John Preston 1654; Charles Steynings1654; Richard Jones 1654; Thomas Hippisley 1654; Samuel Perry 1654; Alexander Popham 1656; Colonel John Gorges 1656; Francis Luttrell 1656; Sir Lislebone Long 1656; William Wyndham 1656; Francis Rolle 1656	Succeeded by John Buckland; Robert Hunt
