= Charles Moore (English politician) =

British politician

Charles Moore (23 December 1771 – 14 December 1826) was an English politician. He served in the House of Commons of Great Britain and House of Commons of the United Kingdom from 1799 to 1802 as Member of Parliament for Woodstock. He was later the member for Heytesbury in the enlarged House of Commons of the United Kingdom from 1802 to 1806 and again from 1807 to 1812.

Parliament of Great Britain
Preceded by Sir Henry Watkin Dashwood; Sir Ralph Payne, Baron Lavington	Member of Parliament for Woodstock; 1799–1800; With: Sir Henry Watkin Dashwood	Succeeded by Parliament of the United Kingdom
Parliament of the United Kingdom
Preceded by Parliament of Great Britain	Member of Parliament for Woodstock; 1801–1802; With: Sir Henry Watkin Dashwood	Succeeded by Sir Henry Watkin Dashwood; Charles Abbot
