= Edward Ashe (died 1656) =

English politician

Edward Ashe (1599 – 31 October 1656) was an English merchant and politician who sat in the House of Commons from 1640 to 1652.

Ashe was the son of James Ashe of Westcombe, Batcombe, Somerset and his wife Grace Pitt, daughter of Richard Pitt of Melcombe Regis, Dorset. After establishing himself as a Draper in the City of London during the 1620s, he built a substantial business in Cannon Street exporting a high-quality fabric known as Spanish cloth, produced in Somerset by his father and his elder brother John Ashe (of Freshford). His most important customers were the Paris merchants, Jacques and Jean Le Couteulx, and Marie Moulard. By the late 1630s Edward and John Ashe were both wealthy men and were drawn into politics.

In November 1640, Ashe was elected Member of Parliament for Heytesbury in the Long Parliament. He had already acquired a manor there and later bought manors at Adderbury in Oxfordshire and at Halstead in Kent. From the mid-1640s his London home and workplace was the former Fullers' Hall in Fenchurch Street.

Ashe died in London at the age of 57. He married twice: first to Elizabeth Woodward (d. 1638), daughter of Christopher Woodward, and second to Elizabeth Jolliffe (d. 1698) and had a family of 8. His brother John, MP for Westbury and Somerset. Edward Ashe was succeeded to his estates by his son William, who rebuilt Heytesbury House c.1700.

Parliament of England
Preceded by Sir John Berkeley; Thomas Moore	Member of Parliament for Heytesbury; 1640–1652; With: Thomas Moore	Succeeded by Not represented in Barebones Parliament
