= Derbyshire (UK Parliament constituency) =

UK parliamentary constituency in England, 1290–1832

- Former county constituency for the House of Commons

1290–1832
- Seats: two
- Replaced by: North Derbyshire and South Derbyshire

Derbyshire is a former United Kingdom Parliamentary constituency. It was a constituency of the House of Commons of the Parliament of England then of the Parliament of Great Britain from 1707 to 1800 and of the Parliament of the United Kingdom from 1801 to 1832. It was represented by two Knights of the Shire.

== History ==
=== Boundaries and franchise ===
The constituency, which first returned members to Parliament in 1290, consisted of the historic county of Derbyshire. (This included the borough of Derby; even though Derby elected two MPs in its own right, it was not excluded from the county constituency, and owning property within the borough could confer a vote at the county election.)

In medieval times, the MPs would have been elected at the county court, by the suitors to the court, which meant the tiny handful of the local nobility who were tenants in chief of the Crown. However, from 1430, the Forty Shilling Freeholder Act extended the right to vote to every man who possessed freehold property within the county valued at £2 or more per year for the purposes of land tax; it was not necessary for the freeholder to occupy his land, nor even in later years to be resident in the county at all.

Except briefly during the period of the Commonwealth, Derbyshire had two MPs elected by the bloc vote method, under which each voter had two votes. (In the First and Second Parliaments of Oliver Cromwell's Protectorate, there was a general redistribution of seats and Derbyshire elected four members; the traditional arrangements were restored from 1659.)

=== Character ===
From Elizabethan times, elections in Derbyshire were dominated by the Cavendish family at Chatsworth, later Dukes of Devonshire. This influence was originally established by the formidable Bess of Hardwick, whose second husband was a Cavendish and who in 1572 manoeuvred to secure her son from that marriage a seat as MP for the county - a considerable honour for a young man from what was then a family of only minor importance. She had meanwhile married the 6th Earl of Shrewsbury, and her stepson, the future 7th Earl, was elected to the second seat for the county at the same time, despite being two-and-a-half years too young to take his seat. From this point onwards until the Reform Act, one of the two MPs was almost invariably a Cavendish or a Cavendish nominee, although the other seat was generally left to the other leading families of the county; the continuance of this dominance was all the more remarkable because Derbyshire did not have a rash of boroughs where the local gentry could find a seat when unable to secure election for Derbyshire - indeed, in the one borough that there was, Derby, the Dukes of Devonshire kept as tight hold on one of the two seats as they did in the county.

As in most counties of any size, contested elections were avoided whenever possible because of the expense. Elections were held at a single polling place, Derby, and voters from the rest of the county had to travel to the county town to exercise their franchise; candidates were expected to meet the expenses of their supporters in travelling to the poll and to entertain them lavishly with food and drink when they got there. There were only four general elections between 1700 and 1832 when Derbyshire's seats were contested: on every other occasion the various competing interests in the county managed to reach agreement on who should represent the county without taking the matter to a poll.

In the pre-industrial era, Derbyshire was a flourishing agricultural county, but it was one of the English counties most dramatically affected by industrialisation in the 18th and early 19th centuries, becoming noted in particular for the manufacture of heavy machinery and (during the Napoleonic Wars) of armaments. Its population grew swiftly (having reached 237,170 by 1831); but the electorate has been estimated at only 3,000 or 4,000 in the second half of the 18th century, and was probably not much higher by the time of the Reform Act. The Dukes of Devonshire were able to maintain much of their traditional influence, Cavendish members occupying one of the two seats as a Whig MP; but the county itself was predominantly Tory, and usually ensured that the other MP was returned in that interest.

Few of the industrial workers, of course, had the vote since they were not property owners, and in the early 19th century political unrest was common - most notably the "Pentrich Revolution" or "Derbyshire Rising" of 1817. Derbyshire soon became one of the most vocal centres of agitation for Parliamentary reform, and by 1830 this sentiment had spread to the voters as well. At the 1831 election their sitting Tory MP was summarily swept out of his seat for supporting a destructive amendment to the Reform Bill.

But the Duke of Devonshire, a supporter of Reform even though it entailed the loss of his own pocket boroughs around the country, was able to retain the voters' support, telling a county meeting in 1832:

The members of the aristocracy have sometimes been considered in an unfavourable light by the people. For much of this they are indebted to the manner in which the present constitution of Parliament has enabled them to interfere and dictate in the representation... Let them stand on their own merits; and I have no fear that the people of England will be unjust to the aristocracy of England, united by mutual kind feelings and good offices, and not by close boroughs and mock representation.

- Speech recorded in the Duke of Devonshire's diary, quoted in Brock

This seems to have sufficiently satisfied the Derbyshire voters that they allowed the Dukes to continue to "interfere and dictate in the representation" to the extent that they continued electing Cavendishes (in the Northern division after the county was divided by the Reform Act) well into the 20th century.

=== Abolition ===
The constituency was abolished in 1832 by the Great Reform Act, which divided the county into two new two-member divisions, Northern Derbyshire and Southern Derbyshire.

== Members of Parliament ==
=== 1290–1399 ===
- Constituency created (1290)

Parliament	First member	Second member
1295	Henry de Kniveton	Giles de Meynell
1297	Robert Dethick	Thomas Foljambe
1298	Henry de Brailsford	Henry FitzHerbert
1300	Geffry de Gresley	Robert de Frechville
1300	Ralf de Frechville	Geffry de Gresley
1301	Ralf de Frechville	Geffry de Gresley
1302	Thomas Foljambe	Robert de Touks
1305	Henry Foljambe	William Faunel
1306	Robert Dethick	Giles de Meynell
1308	Ralph Frechville	William Faunel
1309	Thomas Foljambe	
1311	William Faunel	Thomas Foljambe
1312	William Ressol	William Faunel
1313	Ralph Frechville	
1315	Ralph Frechville	Thomas Foljambe
1315	Robert Staunton	John Twyford
1316	John Beaufay	Robert Staunton
1317	Robert Staunton	John Deynecourt
1319	John de Twyford	Ralf de Cromwell
1319	John Deynecourt	John de Twyford
1324	Hugh de Meynell	Nicholas de Longford
1325	Ralf de Reseby	William Rosell
1326	William Rosell	John de Beaufay
1327	Thomas de Stanton	William Michell
1327	William de Samperton	Simon de Cestre
1327	William Michell	Robert Ingram de Etewell
1328	John de Beaufay	William Michell
1328	Robert de Meynell	John de Beaufay
1330	Edm. de Appleby	John de Verdon
1330	Hugh de Meynell	Robert de Meynell
1331	Hugh FitzHugh de Meynell	Roger de Okeover
1332	Robert de Meynell	William Michell
1332	Hugh de Meynell	Robert de Meynell
1332	Robert de Meynell	Peter de Wakebrigg
1333	William de Saperton	Simon de Chester
1333	Robert de Meynell	Peter de Wakebrigg
1334	Robert de Ingram	John de Hambury
1334	William de Saperton	Simon de Chester
1335	Henry de Kniveton	John Cockeyn
1336	Peter de Wakebrigg	Hugh de Muskham
1337	William Michell	Thomas? Adam
1337	Giles de Meynell	Robert Franceys
1337	Giles de Meynell	John Cockeyn
1338	Giles de Meynell	Robert Franceys
1338	John Cockeyn	Godfrey Foljambe
1338	John Deyncourts	John de Twyford
1339	John Cokeyn	Thomas Adam
1339	John Cockeyn	Robert de Chester
1340	Sir Godfrey Foljambe	John Cockayn
1340	Robert Ingram	Robert Gresley
1340	Robert Ingram	
1340	Robert Touks	John Beausey
1341	John Cockeyn	Robert of Ireland
1343	Thomas Adam	Robert Asheburn
1344	John Cockeyn	John Foucher
1346	Giles de Meynell	Roger de Emerton
1346	William de Ashewell	John de Chellaston
1347	Roger de Enyton	Robert de Ashbourn
1348	John de Rochford	John de Chellaston
1348	Roger de Enynton	Robert de Ashbourn
1350	John Cockeyn	John Foucher
1351	John Cockeyn	John Foucher
1352	Roger de Padley	William de Chester
1352	Robert de Twyford	
1353	Robert Franceys	
1354	Henry de Braylesford	Robert Franceys
1355	Thomas Adam	John Beck
1357	Robert Franceys	Thomas Adam
1357	William de Wakebrigg	Mi. de Breideston
1357	Robert Franceys	Thomas Adam
1358	William de Wakebrigg	Roger Michell
1360	Robert Franceys	John Foucher
1360	Henry de Braylesford	John Cockayn
1361	Henry de Braylesford	John Cockayn
1362	John Cockayn	Robert Franceys
1363	Edmund de Appleby	
1364	Sir Godfrey Foljambe	Henry de Braylesford
1365	Robert de Twyford	Ralph de Stathom
1368	Robert de Twyford	John Foucher
1369	Sir Godfrey Foljambe	Robert de Twyford
1371	Sir Godfrey Foljambe	John Foucher
1371	Sir Godfrey Foljambe	John Foucher
1372	Alured de Sulney	John Franceys
1373	William Bokepnys	Ralph de Stathom
1377	Edmund de Appleby	Ralph de Stathom
1377	John de la Pole de Hertingdon	E. Foucher
1378	Alured Sulwey	Sir Robert Twyford
1379	Oliver de Barton	Ralph de Stathom
1379	Alured Sulwey	John Curson de Ketilston
1380	Sir Thomas Marchington	Henry de Braylesford
1381	Oliver de Barton	William de Sallowe
1382	T. (Robert?) de Twyford	Sir Thomas Marchington
1382	Sir Thomas Marchington	Sir Philip Okeover
1383	Thomas de Wernesley	John Curson
1383	Sir Thomas Marchington	Ralph de Braylesford
1384	John Curson	Ralph de Braylesford
1384	Robert Franceys	William de Adderly
1386	Sir Thomas Wensley of Wensley	Sir William Dethick of Dethick
1388 (Feb)	Robert Franceys	William de Adderly
1388 (Sep)	Sir Nicholas Montgomery of Marston Montgomery	Robert Franceys
1390 (Jan)	Sir Thomas Wensley of Wensley	Sir Nicholas Montgomery of Marston Montgomery
1390 (Nov)	William Adderly	Thomas Foljambe
1391	Sir Philip Okeover	Thomas Foljambe
1393	John Dabrichecourt	Nicholas Gousill, jnr
1394	Sir Thomas Wensley of Wensley	John de la Pole
1395	Sir John Cokayne	Peter de Melbourne
1397 (Jan)	Sir William Dethick of Dethick	Roger de Bradburn
1397 (Sep)	John Dabrichecourt	William Meynell
1399	Walter Blount	John Curson

== 1400–1499 ==
Parliament	First member	Second member
1400	Thomas Gresley	Peter de la Pole
1402	Sir John Cokayne	Roger Leche
1403	Nicholas de Longford	John Curson
1404	Sir John Cokayne	Roger Bradburn
1405	Roger Leche	Roger Bradshaw
1406	Robert de Strelley	Thomas Okeover
1411	Sir Nicholas Montgomery of Marston Montgomery	Robert Franceys
1413	Roger Leche	Thomas Chaworth
1414 (Apr)	Philip Leche	Nicolas Montgomery
1414 (Nov)	Roger Leche	Thomas Gresley
1416 (Mar)	Nicolas Montgomery	John de la Pole
1417	Thomas de Gresley	John de la Pole
1419	Sir John Cokayne	Hugh Erdeswyck
1420	Thomas Blount	Henry Booth
1420	John de Strelley	John de Okeover
1421 (Dec)	Nicholas Gosell	Thomas Okeover
1422	Sir Richard Vernon	Sir John Cokayne
1423	Henry Booth	John Curson
1424	Henry Booth	Thomas Makworth
1426	Sir Richard Vernon	John de la Pole
1427	Sir John Cokayne	Henry Booth
1429	John Curson	Gerard Meynell
1430	Sir John Cokayne	Thomas Makworth
1432	Richard Vernon	
1433	Sir Richard Vernon	
1434	John Curson	Gerard Meynell
1436	Fulk Vernon	Robert Franceys
1441	John Curson	William Vernon
1446	Walter Blount	Nicholas FitzHerbert
1448	John Sacherevel	Walter Blount
1449	William Vernon	John Sacherevel
1450	William Vernon	Walter Blount
1452	Walter Blount	Nicholas FitzHerbert
1454	Walter Blount	Robert Bailey
1460	Sir John Greisley	Walter Blount
1468	William Blount	William Vernon
1473	Nicholas Longford	James Blount
1478	John Gresley	Henry Vernon
1479–1499	Records lost	

== 1500–1640 ==
Parliament	First member	Second member
1510–1523	No Names Known	
1529	Sir Roger Mynors	William Coffin
1536		
1539	Francis Leke	John Port
1542	?	Sir George Vernon
1545	Richard Blackwell	Vincent Mundy
1547	Sir William Bassett	Thomas Powtrell
1553 (Mar)	Sir Thomas Cockayne	Sir Humphrey Bradburn
1553 (Oct)	Sir John Port	Richard Blackwell
1554 (Apr)	Francis Curzon	Thomas Powtrell
1554 (Nov)	Sir Peter Freschville	Henry Vernon
1555	Sir Humphrey Bradburn	Vincent Mundy
1558	John Zouche	Godfrey Foljambe
1558–1559	Nicholas Longford	Thomas Kniveton
1562–1563	Sir William St Loe, died and replaced in 1566 by George Hastings	Robert Wennersley
1571	Francis Curson	Robert Wennersley
1572–1584	Gilbert Talbot	Henry Cavendish
1585–1587	Henry Talbot	Henry Cavendish
1588-1592	John Zouch	Henry Cavendish
1593–1596	George Manners	Henry Cavendish
1597–1600	Thomas Gresley	John Harpur
1601	Francis Leeke	Sir Peter Fretchville
1605–1611	Sir John Harpur	William Kniveton
1614	Sir William Cavendish	Henry Howard
1621	Sir William Cavendish	Sir Peter Fretchville
1624	Sir William Cavendish	John Stanhope
1625	Sir William Cavendish	John Stanhope
1626	Sir William Cavendish	John Manners
1628	Sir Edward Leeke	John Frescheville
1629–1640	No Parliaments summoned	

=== 1640–1653 ===
Year	First member	First party	Second member	Second party
April 1640	Sir John Curzon, 1st Baronet		John Manners	
November 1640	Sir John Curzon, 1st Baronet	Parliamentarian	Sir John Coke	Parliamentarian
December 1648	Curzon excluded in Pride's Purge; Coke went abroad and died in 1650			
1653	Gervase Bennet		Nathaniel Barton	

=== 1654–1658 ===
- Representation increased to four members in the First and Second Parliaments of the Protectorate

Year	First member	Second member	Third member	Fourth member
1654	Nathaniel Barton	Thomas Sanders	Edward Gell	John Gell
1656	Sir Samuel Sleigh	Thomas Sanders	German Pole	John Gell

=== 1659–1832 ===
- Representation restored to two members in the Third Protectorate Parliament

Year	First member	First party	Second member	Second party
January 1659	John Gell		Thomas Sanders	
May 1659	Not represented in the restored Rump			
April 1660	Viscount Mansfield		John Ferrers	
1661	Lord Cavendish		John Frescheville	
1665	Lord Cavendish		John Milward	
1670	Lord Cavendish		William Sacheverell	
1685	Sir Robert Coke, 2nd Bt.		Sir Gilbert Clarke	
January 1689	Sir John Gell, 2nd Bt.		Sir Gilbert Clarke	
April 1689	Sir Philip Gell, 3rd Bt.	Whig	Sir Gilbert Clarke	
1690	Henry Gilbert		Sir Gilbert Clarke	
1695	Marquess of Hartington	Whig	Sir Gilbert Clarke	
1698	Marquess of Hartington	Whig	Thomas Coke	
January 1701	Marquess of Hartington	Whig	Lord Roos	
December 1701	Thomas Coke		Sir John Curzon, 3rd Bt.	Tory
1710	Godfrey Clarke		Sir John Curzon, 3rd Bt.	Tory
1727	Godfrey Clarke		Sir Nathaniel Curzon, 4th Bt.	Tory
1734	Lord Charles Cavendish	Whig	Sir Nathaniel Curzon, 4th Bt.	Tory
1741	Marquess of Hartington	Whig	Sir Nathaniel Curzon, 4th Bt.	Tory
1751	Lord Frederick Cavendish	Whig	Sir Nathaniel Curzon, 4th Bt.	Tory
1754	Lord George Cavendish	Whig	Sir Nathaniel Curzon, 5th Bt.	Tory
1761	Lord George Cavendish	Whig	Sir Henry Harpur, 6th Bt.	Tory
1768	Lord George Cavendish	Whig	Godfrey Bagnall Clarke	Tory
1775	Lord George Cavendish	Whig	Hon. Nathaniel Curzon	Tory
1780	Lord Richard Cavendish	Whig	Hon. Nathaniel Curzon	Tory
1781	Lord George Cavendish	Whig	Hon. Nathaniel Curzon	Tory
1784	Lord George Cavendish	Whig	Edward Miller Mundy	Tory
1794	Lord John Cavendish	Whig	Edward Miller Mundy	Tory
1797	Lord George Cavendish	Whig	Edward Miller Mundy	Tory
1822	Lord George Cavendish	Whig	Francis Mundy	Tory
1831	Lord George Cavendish	Whig	Hon. George Venables-Vernon	Whig
1832	Constituency abolished: see Northern Derbyshire, Southern Derbyshire			

== Elections ==
General election 1734: Derbyshire (2 seats)
Party	Candidate	Votes	%	±%
Whig	Charles Cavendish	697	74.1	
Tory	Nathaniel Curzon	134	14.2	
	Henry Harpur	110	11.7	

- Source

== See also ==
- List of former United Kingdom Parliament constituencies
- Unreformed House of Commons
