= Gervase Bennet =

English politician

Gervase Bennet (born 1612) was an English politician who sat in the House of Commons of England between 1653 and 1659. Bennet coined the term "Quakers" to refer to the Religious Society of Friends.

Bennet was Mayor of Derby in 1645 when there was a plague in Derby. He was also a magistrate and in 1650, he and Nathaniel Barton conducted the trial of George Fox, founder of the Religious Society of Friends. Fox told the bench "Tremble at the word of the Lord", to which Bennett replied that the only "quaker" in court was him, after which the nickname Quakers to refer to members of the Society entered common parlance.

In 1653, Bennet was nominated for the Barebones Parliament as representative for Derbyshire. In 1654, he was elected Member of Parliament for Derby in the First Protectorate Parliament and was returned in the Second Protectorate Parliament in 1656 and the Third Protectorate Parliament of 1659.

Bennet owned estates of Littleover and Snelston. He married a coheiress of the Rowe family, and had a son, Robert. He was aged 50 in 1662 and the estate was sold in 1682.

Parliament of England
Preceded by Sir John Curzon, 1st Bt. Sir John Coke (Both excluded in Pride's Purge)	Member of Parliament for Derbyshire; 1653; With: Nathaniel Barton	Succeeded by Nathaniel Barton; Thomas Sanders; Edward Gell; John Gell
Preceded by Unrepresented	Member of Parliament for Derby; 1654–1659	Succeeded by Nathaniel Hallowes
