= Henry Vernon =

Henry Vernon may refer to:

- Henry Vernon (died 1515) (1441–1515), Tudor courtier, MP for Derbyshire
- Henry Vernon (died 1569) (1523–1569), MP for Lichfield and Derbyshire
- Henry Vernon (cricketer) (1828–1855), English cricketer
- Sir Henry Vernon, 1st Baronet (1605–1676)
- Henry Vernon (1663–1732), English MP for Stafford
- Henry Vernon (1686–1719), English MP for Staffordshire and Newcastle-under-Lyme
- Henry Vernon (1718–1765), English MP for Lichfield and Newcastle-under-Lyme

== See also ==
- Henry Venables-Vernon, 3rd Baron Vernon (1747–1829), Baron Vernon
