= John Frescheville, 1st Baron Frescheville =

English soldier, landowner and politician

John Frescheville, 1st Baron Frescheville (4 December 1607 – 31 March 1682) was an English soldier, landowner and politician who sat in the House of Commons at various times between 1628 and 1665 when he was created a peer and then sat in the House of Lords.

== Biography ==
Frescheville was the son of Sir Peter Frescheville of Staveley, Derbyshire and his first wife Joyce Fleetwood, daughter of Thomas Fleetwood of The Vache, Chalfont St. Giles, Buckinghamshire. He matriculated at Magdalen Hall, Oxford on 23 June 1621, aged 14 and was a student of Middle Temple in 1624. In 1628, Frescheville was elected Member of Parliament for Derbyshire and sat until 1629 when King Charles decided to rule without parliament for eleven years. He became Deputy Lieutenant of Derbyshire in 1630, holding the post until 1642. In 1634 he succeeded his father. He became a cornet of the bodyguard and a gentleman of the Privy Chamber in 1639. In 1642 he was a commissioner of array and became a captain of horse in the Royalist army. He was a colonel from 1643 to 1644 and became governor of Welbeck in 1645. Although a Royalist, he had useful contacts among the Parliamentarians and was required to pay a modest fine of £287 10s.4d conditional upon endowing a local chapel.

Just before the Restoration, Frescheville became involved in Royalist activities and crossed over to the Netherlands to obtain a fresh warrant for a peerage. He became Deputy Lieutenant again and a J.P. in July 1660, retaining the appointments to his death. From October 1660 to 1661 he was a captain the volunteer horse and in 1661 became captain of a troop in the Royal Horse Guards until 1679. In 1661 he was elected MP for Derbyshire again for the Cavalier Parliament. He was commissioner for assessment from 1661 to 1665, commissioner for loyal and indigent officers in 1662 and commissioner for corporations from 1662 to 1663. In 1665 he was commissioner for oyer and terminer on the Northern circuit. He was created Baron Frescheville of Staveley in the Peerage of England on 16 March 1665. He was governor of York from 1670 until his death.

Frescheville died at the age of about 75 and was buried at Staveley.

== Family ==
Frescheville married firstly Bruce Nicholls, daughter of Francis Nicholls, barrister, of the Middle Temple and Ampthill, Bedfordshire. She died without issue on 10 April 1629.

He married secondly in April 1630, Sarah Harington, daughter of Sir John Harington of Elmesthorpe, Leicestershire and had three daughters:

- Christian (13 December 1633 – 22 May 1653), married Charles Paulet, 1st Duke of Bolton
- Elizabeth (1 January 1634 – 22 February 1690), married Conyers Darcy, 2nd Earl of Holderness
- Frances, married Colonel Thomas Colepepper

Sarah died on 25 June 1665.

He married thirdly in December 1666, Anna Charlotte de Vic, daughter of Sir Henry de Vic, 1st Baronet, Chancellor of the Order of the Garter at Windsor Castle. She served as a Lady of the Bedchamber at the court of Queen Anne. She died without issue on 12 November 1717.

== Monument ==
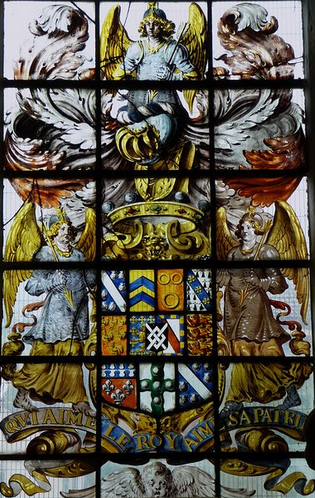
Frescheville Window, central element, Church of St John the Baptist, Staveley, by Henry Gyles of York, 1676

In the Frescheville Chapel within the Church of St John the Baptist, Staveley, survives a fine heraldic stained glass window, made in 1676 by Henry Gyles of York, in memory of the 1st Baron. In the centre is a shield of 11 quarters with inescutcheon of pretence of Harington (Sable, a fret azure), for Sarah Harington, his 2nd wife. In the two supporting lights of the window are four further shields: 1: Frecheville impaling Nicholls (Azure, a fess between three lion's heads and necks erased or) (his first marriage) top left; 2: Frecheville alone, bottom left; 3: Frecheville with an inescutcheon of Harington (his second marriage) bottom right; 4: Frecheville impaling De Vick (Or, three caltraps sable, on a chief azure a lion's head and neck erased or) (his third marriage) top right.

Below the window is the tomb or monument of the 1st Baron inscribed:

HERE LIES THE MORTAL PART OF THE RIGHT HONOURABLE John, LORD FRECHEVILLE, BARON of stavELEY, GoverNouR OF YorkE, &c. DEscENDED FROM THE ANTIENT AND Noble FAMILIES of THE FRECHEVILLES, BARONs of crich, AND of THE MUSARDS, BARONS OF STAveLEY, who DEPARTED THIS LIFE MARCH 31st ANNO D'N1 1682, AGED 76 YEARs. ANNE-charlotte, Lady FREcheville, IN MEMORY of her DEAREST LORD AND HUSBAND, CAUSED THIS MONUMENT TO BE ERECTED

Parliament of England
Preceded by Sir William Cavendish; John Manners	Member of Parliament for Derbyshire; 1628–1629; With: Sir Edward Leeke	Parliament suspended until 1640
Preceded by Viscount Mansfield; John Ferrers	Member of Parliament for Derbyshire; 1661–1665; With: Lord Cavendish	Succeeded by Lord Cavendish; John Milward
Peerage of England
New creation	Baron Frescheville; 1665–1682	Extinct
