= Thomas Cokayne =

English soldier (1520–1592)

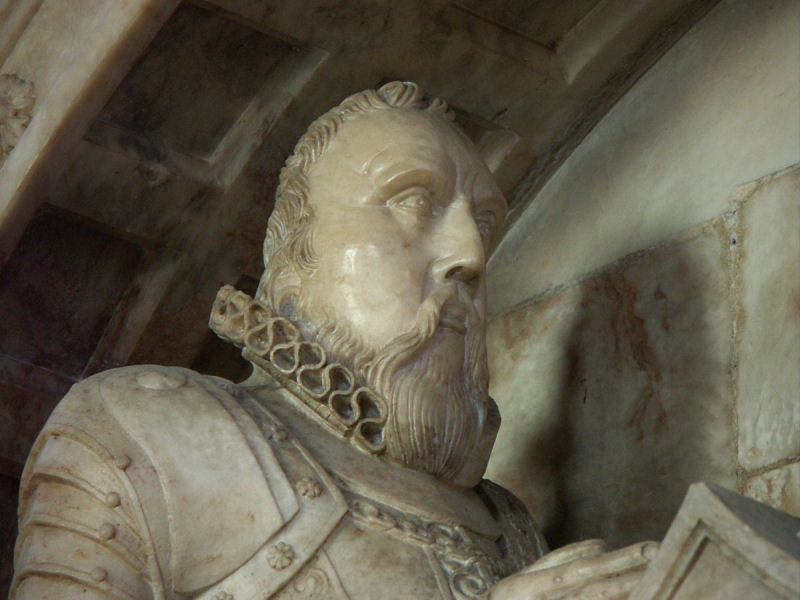
Marble bust of Thomas Cokayne at the family monument, St Oswald's Church, Ashbourne.

Sir Thomas Cokayne or Cockayne (27 November 1520 — 15 November 1592) was an English soldier, huntsman, and MP for Derbyshire in March 1553.

== Early life and education ==
Thomas Cokayne was born on 27 November 1520 to Francis Cokayne of Ashbourne, Derbyshire and his wife, Dorothy (daughter and heiress of Thomas Marrow of Berkswell). He was born into the family of Cokayne, who first settled in Ashbourne in the mid-12th-century, and were one of the oldest families in Derbyshire, in possession of many estates in their home county, Staffordshire, and Warwickshire. On 5 August 1538, aged 18, Cokayne came into his father's inheritance. Francis had been the head of the family for only 16 months, and his death left the underage Cokayne its new head. The following year, he was admitted to Gray's Inn, and Cokayne put himself into the service of Francis Talbot, 5th Earl of Shrewsbury.

== Military career ==
Like his grandfather, Thomas Cokayne "the Magnificent", Cokayne was a keen soldier, commended by contemporaries as "a bold and [...] worthy knight". In 1544, he took part in the Rough Wooing of Scotland, alongside Edward Seymour, 1st Duke of Somerset, and was knighted on 11 May 1544, for his part in the Burning of Edinburgh. In a 13 August 1548 muster, he was listed among the captains selected "For the Battaile", as part of the relief for George Talbot, 6th Earl of Shrewsbury at the Siege of Haddington. Later in life, Cokayne credited "many extraordinary favours" to the earls of Shrewsbury, evidently grateful for his military service. He was among those who, in the reign of Elizabeth I, confronted the Spanish Armada at the Battle of Gravelines. In 1587, on her way to her final imprisonment and eventual execution at Fotheringhay Castle, he attended Mary, Queen of Scots' travel "with but a small trayne" as far as Derby. He was evidently a trusted subject, selected on this occasion as "sound in religion [...] and faithful to her Majesty".

== Public offices and duties ==
According to C. J. Black, writing for The History of Parliament: "under Elizabeth, Cokayne was evidently one of the local pillars of church and state". His first public office was as the commissary of musters for Derbyshire in 1546 (an office he held again in 1577 and 1584). He held the offices of Justice of the peace for Derbyshire in 1547, 1555, and for Warwickshire in 1554; he was sheriff of Nottinghamshire and Derbyshire from 1549 to 1550 and from 1559 to 1560, and of Derbyshire alone from 1569 to 1570, from 1579 to 1580, and from 1585 to 1586. He was commissary for relief in 1550, for subsidy in 1563, and "to inquire into Jesuits and seminarists" in 1585; keeper of Ravensdale Park in May 1553; collector for loans in Derbyshire in 1562; and steward for the manors of Ashbourne and Hartington by 1590.

In the parliament of March 1553, Cokayne was the Member of Parliament for Derbyshire. He probably obtained this office thanks to the lobbying of the Earl of Shrewsbury, as the Earl had been vocal in his support of summoning the parliament; though Cokayne was no doubt aided by his previous qualifications as a soldier, sheriff and justice of the constituency. Black gives no detail of his actions as a member past a pithy statement that he "was probably more happily seated on a horse than in the Commons".

Cockayne performed several less official duties as a respected and Conformist subject of the Queen. In 1564, he advised Scottish Protestant, Thomas Bentham, on the religious conformity of his fellow justices of the peace in Derbyshire; he was charged with investigating the dispute between the Earl of Shrewsbury and his Glossopdale tenantry in 1581; he questioned a correspondent of Mary, Queen of Scots in 1584; and he impounded the belongings of the Derbyshire-born attempted assassin of Elizabeth, Anthony Babington, in 1586. He showed his faith in the Crown with a donation of £50 to the Armada loan in 1588.

== A Short Treatise of Hunting (1591) ==
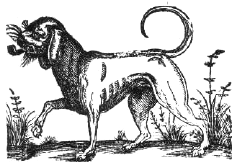
Dog in the frontispiece of the Treatise (1591).

Being "a professed hunter, and not a scholler", as he admitted in its dedication, Cokayne compiled a collection of hunting tips in old age "for the delight of noblemen and gentlemen", and published them under the title A Short Treatise of Hunting in 1591. With 52 years' experience in hunting, Cokayne was quick to commend the sport as a pastime; "hunters", he wrote in its preface, "by their continual travail, painful labour, often watching, and enduring of hunger, of heat, and of cold, are much enabled above others to the service of their prince and country to the wars [...] and their minds also by this honest recreation the more fit and the better disposed to all other good exercises". He also drew attention to its use in saving England "from the hurt of foxes and other ravenous vermine". Though he was wont to shield hunting from the "carping speaches of the enemies thereof", he warned his readers against using the sport as "an occupation to spend therein daies, moneths, and yeres, to the hinderance of the service of God, her maistie or your Countrey". Cokayne dedicated the Treatise to his patron, the 7th Earl of Shrewsbury, and illustrated the book with woodcuts of various game animals.

== Personal life, death and monument ==
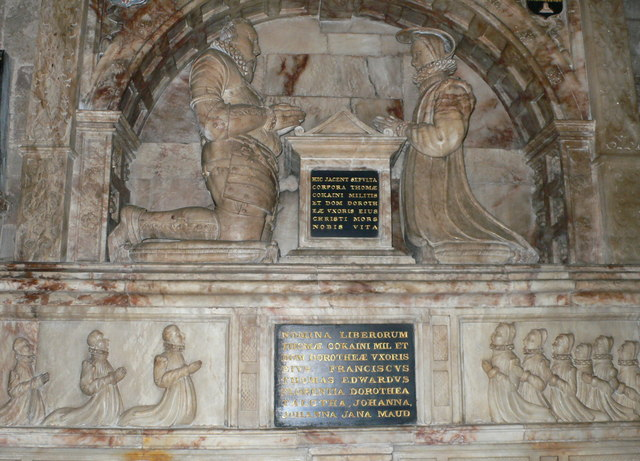
Marble monument to Thomas Cockayne and his wife Dorothy in St Oswald's Church, Ashbourne.

About 1540 (and definitely by 1545), he married Dorothy, the daughter of Sir Humphrey Ferrers of Tamworth (his stepfather). Thomas and Dorothy had seven daughters and three sons. Their joint funerary monument lists their children in Latin as: Franciscus Thomas Edwardus Florentia Dorothea Talutha Johanna Johanna Jan Maud. (Note: According to E. A. Sadler, the occurrence of the name "Johanna" twice "is probably due to the custom, common in those times, of giving to a child the name of a preceding one who had died".) Cokayne was frequently visited by the chronicler Raphael Holinshed, Holinshed being a steward of an estate neighbouring Cokayne's Pooley Hall in Warwickshire.

Cokayne composed his will on 8 December 1591, naming Dorothy and Francis, his eldest son, as his executors, with Sir Humphrey Ferrers and Sir Edward Littleton as supervisors. His will made mention of a previous incident, "in regard of some debts he was then entered into", that made him mistrust Francis, but by the time of his death, he evidently had no misgivings. Cokayne specifically requested that his executors "use no vain pomp nor foolish ceremonies which I have always accounted superstitions" in his funeral. Cokayne died on 15 November 1592 and was buried that night; Dorothy died 3 years later, on 21 December 1595.

After their deaths, Thomas and Dorothy had a joint memorial raised in St Oswald's Church, Ashbourne. Many of his ancestors had similar memorials in the church, but Thomas was the last of the family to erect one. The monument is a large alabaster and marble tomb in the Renaissance style. Its main feature is a recess, where full-length figures of Thomas and Dorothy face each other, while kneeling over a prayer desk (which is inscribed with a Latin memorial). (Note: The memorial reads: "HIC JACENT SEPVLTA CORPORA THOMÆ COKAINI MILITI SET DOM DOROTH EÆ, VXORIS EIVS CHRISTI MORS NOBIS VITA") Beneath these figures are two panels, with kneeling figures of their children in miniature: three sons under Thomas and seven daughters under Dorothy.

== Sources ==
- Sadler, E. A. (1934). "The ancient family of Cockayne and their monuments in Ashbourne Church" (PDF). Derbyshire Archaeological Journal. 55: 14–39. doi:10.5284/1065916.
- Cokayne, A. E. (1869). Cockayne memoranda: collections towards a historical record of the family of Cockayne. Congleton: Privately published.

Parliament of England
Preceded by Sir William Bassett; Thomas Powtrell	Member of Parliament for Derbyshire; March 1553; With: Sir Humphrey Bradburn	Succeeded by Sir John Port; Richard Blackwell
