= William Sacheverell =

English politician (1638–1691)

William Sacheverell (1638 – 9 October 1691) was an English politician who sat in the House of Commons in two periods between 1670 and 1691.

== Life ==
Sacheverell was the son of Henry Sacheverell, a country gentleman, by his wife Joyce Mansfield. His family had been prominent in Derbyshire and Nottinghamshire since the 12th century; William inherited large estates from his father. He was admitted to Gray's Inn in 1667, and in 1670 he was elected Member of Parliament for Derbyshire. He immediately gained a prominent position in the party hostile to the Court, and before he had been in the House of Commons for six months, he proposed a resolution that all "popish recusants" should be removed from military commands; the motion, enlarged so as to include civil employment, was carried without a division on 28 February 1672–1673. This resolution was the forerunner of the Test Act, in the preparation of which Sacheverell took an active part, and which caused the breakup of the cabal.

Sacheverell took part in nearly every debate in the House of Commons, and was recognized as one of the most able leaders of the opposition or "Country Party". He strongly opposed the king's alliance with France, advocating a league with the Dutch and the refusal of supplies until the demands of the Commons should be complied with. Sacheverell took a special interest in the navy and spoke in many debates on this question. In 1677 he carried an address to the king calling upon him to conclude an alliance with the United Provinces against Louis XIV of France, and when the Speaker adjourned the House by Charles's order Sacheverell made an eloquent protest, asserting the right of the House itself to decide the question of its adjournment. When parliament met early in 1678 assurances were received from Charles that he had arranged the treaties demanded by the Commons; but Sacheverell boldly questioned the king's good faith, and warned the Commons that they were being deceived. When the secret treaty with France became known, confirming Sacheverell's insight, he called for the disbandment of the forces and advocated the refusal of further supplies for military purposes; and in June 1678 he resolutely opposed Lord Danby's proposal to grant £300,000 per annum to Charles II for life. Jean Barillon mentions Sacheverell among the Whig leaders who accepted bribes from Louis XIV, but the evidence against him is not conclusive.

When Titus Oates began his "revelations" in 1678, Sacheverell was among those who most firmly believed in the existence of a Popish Plot. He was one of the most active investigators of the affair, and one of the managers in the impeachment of the five Catholic peers. He also acted for a time as chairman of the secret committee of the Commons, and drew up the report on the examination of the Jesuit Coleman, secretary to Mary of Modena, the Duchess of York. He was a member of the committee that drafted the articles of impeachment against Danby in 1678, and was appointed one of the managers of the Commons; and in 1679, when the impeachment, interrupted by the dissolution of parliament, was resumed in the new parliament, he spoke strongly against the validity of Danby's plea of pardon by the king.

The allegations in Sacheverell's report on the examination of Coleman prompted the country party to demand the exclusion of James, Duke of York, from the succession to the throne, the first suggestion of the famous Exclusion Bill being made by Sacheverell on 4 November 1678 in a debate--"the greatest that ever was in Parliament," as it was pronounced by contemporaries—raised by Lord Russell with the object of removing the duke from the King's Council. He vigorously promoted the bill in the House of Commons and opposed granting supplies until it should pass. When Charles offered an alternative scheme (1679) for limiting the powers of a Catholic sovereign, Sacheverell made a great speech in which he pointed out the insufficiency of the king's terms for securing the object desired by the Whigs. In the conflict between the Petitioners and the Abhorrers he supported the former, and on 27 October 1680 brought forward a motion asserting the right of petitioning the king to summon parliament, and proposed the impeachment of Chief Justice North as the author of the proclamation against tumultuous petitioning. Sacheverell was one of the managers on behalf of the Commons at the trial of Lord Stafford in Westminster Hall; but took no further part in public affairs. Even after the elections of March 1681, when he was returned unopposed for Derbyshire, he did not contribute much to the Oxford parliament.

=== Surrender of Nottingham's charter ===
Outside parliament, when the question of the surrender of the borough charter came before the Nottingham Council in 1682, it split Nottingham council down the middle. In July, the corporation resolved on surrender on the mayor’s casting vote. The local Whigs fiercely opposed giving up their ancient rights, but a protest signed by over 300 'burgesses' made no difference. After warning the Lord Chancellor, Heneage Finch of his intention, Sacheverell took the lead in resisting the new charter, which did not affect the franchise, but the objectionable clauses provided for the removal of officials by order-in-council. At the subsequent Michaelmas, unruliness prevailed during borough election. Two rival mayors were elected, both parties claiming to act by a valid charter: Sacheverell's maintaining the old charter, supported by Edward Bigland, the old recorder, and Richard Slater, the other party upholding the new one, which only arrived during the day. Twenty-two of the Whiggish opposition, including Sacheverell, were indicted for rioting. The case was tried in 1684 before either George Jeffreys, who gave a violent summing up, and locked up the jury until it yielded at midnight, or Francis North, who conducted the trial with exemplary fairness, acknowledging Sacheverell's 'loyalty and good affection to the Church and Crown', and not hesitating to rebuke the prosecution. Sacheverell was fined 500 marks (£333.33 - equivalent to £62,383 in 2025) and bound over to good behaviour, while other prominent Nottingham inhabitants were fined lesser sums.

At the general election following the death of Charles II in 1685 Sacheverell lost his seat, and for the next four years he lived in retirement on his estates. In the latter part of James II's reign, many Whig rank and file hoped to wrest back control from the local gentry and Tories. In Nottingham, Whigs who had been fined for riot were now installed in the corporation. Sacheverel was amongst these 'Whig collaborators', indeed he was the most prominent all the radicals. His eagerness to pledge support for James could be due to two factors. Firstly, Sacheverel, as a shrewd judge of events, believed that James had some chances of success and secondly, James had a hold over a heavily fined rioter.

=== Return to Parliament ===
In the Convention Parliament summoned by William III in 1689, he sat for Heytesbury. He spoke in favour of a radical resettlement of the constitution, and served on a committee, of which Somers was chairman, for drawing up a new constitution in the form of the Declaration of Right; he was one of the representatives of the Commons in their conference with the peers on the question of declaring the throne vacant. William III appointed Sacheverell a lord of the admiralty, but he resigned the office after a few months. He procured the omission of Lord Jeffreys's name from the Act of Indemnity.

In 1690 Sacheverell moved a famous amendment to the Corporation Bill, proposing the addition of a clause for disqualifying for office for seven years municipal functionaries who had surrendered their charters to the Crown. A celebrated debate on this question took place in the House of Commons in January 1690; but the evident intention of the Whigs to perpetuate their own ascendancy by tampering with the franchise contributed largely to the Tory reaction which resulted in the defeat of the Whigs in the elections of that year. Sacheverell was elected member for Nottinghamshire; but be died before taking his seat.

In the judgment of Speaker Onslow, Sacheverell was the "ablest parliament man" of the reign of Charles II. He was one of the earliest English parliamentary orators; his speeches greatly impressed his contemporaries, and in a later generation, as Thomas Macaulay observes, they were "a favourite theme of old men who lived to see the conflicts of Robert Walpole and William Pulteney. Though his fame has become dimmed in comparison with that of Shaftesbury, Russell and Sidney, he was equally conspicuous in the parliamentary proceedings of Charles II's reign, and left a more permanent mark than any of them on the constitutional changes of the period."

== Family ==
Sacheverell was twice married. His first wife was Mary, daughter of William Staunton of Staunton; and his second was Jane, daughter of Sir John Newton. His eldest son, Robert, represented the borough of Nottingham in six parliaments. The family became extinct in the male line in 1724.

== Bibliography ==
- Sitwell, George Reresby (1897). "Sacheverell, William" . In Lee, Sidney (ed.). Dictionary of National Biography. Vol. 50. London: Smith, Elder & Co.
- Handley, Stuart. "Sacheverell, William (1637/8–1691)". Oxford Dictionary of National Biography (online ed.). Oxford University Press. doi:10.1093/ref:odnb/24441. (Subscription, Wikipedia Library access or UK public library membership required.)
- Many of Sacheverell's speeches are reported in Anchitell Grey, Debates of the House of Commons, 1667–1694 (10 vols., 1769).
- Sir John Reresby, Memoirs, 1634–1689, edited by J. J. Cartwright. (1875);
- Roger North, Autobiography, edited by Augustus Jessopp (1887);
- Lives of the Right Hon. F. North, Baron Guilford, etc. (3 vols., London, 1826);
- The Hatton Correspondence, edited by E. M. Thompson for the Camden Society (2 vols., 1878);
- Laurence Eachard, History of England 5 vols., 1707–1718).

Parliament of England
| Preceded by Lord Cavendish; John Milward | Member of Parliament for Derbyshire; 1670–1685; With: Lord Cavendish 1670–1684 | Succeeded by Sir Robert Coke, 2nd Baronet; Sir Gilbert Clarke |
| Preceded by Edward Ashe; William Ashe | Member of Parliament for Heytesbury; 1689–1690; With: William Ashe | Succeeded by William Trenchard; William Ashe |
| Preceded by Sir Scrope Howe; John White | Member of Parliament for Nottinghamshire; 1690–1691; With: Sir Scrope Howe | Succeeded by Sir Scrope Howe; John White |
