= Francis Curzon =

Francis Curzon may refer to:

- Francis Curzon (died 1592), English politician
- Francis Curzon, 5th Earl Howe (1884–1964), British naval officer, politician, and racing driver and promoter
- Francis Curzon, 3rd Viscount Scarsdale (1924–2000), British peer
