= John Cokayne (died 1438) =

English soldier, politician and landowner

Sir John Cokayne knt.

Member of Parliament for Derbyshire
- In office 1395–1397 Serving with Peter Melbourne
- Preceded by: Sir Thomas Wensley; Sir John de la Pole
- Succeeded by: Roger Bradbourne; Sir William Dethick
- In office 1402 – January 1404 Serving with Roger Leche
- Preceded by: Roger Bradbourne; Sir William Dethick
- Succeeded by: Sir Nicholas Longford; John Curson
- In office October 1404 – 1406 Serving with Roger Bradbourne
- Preceded by: Sir John Cornwall, David Holbache
- Succeeded by: Roger Bradshaw; Roger Leche
- In office 1419–1420 Serving with Hugh Erdeswyk
- Preceded by: John de la Pole; Sir Thomas Gresley
- Succeeded by: Thomas Blount; Henry Booth
- In office May 1421 – December 1421 Serving with Sir Thomas Gresley
- Preceded by: Thomas Blount; Henry Booth
- Succeeded by: Nicholas Goushill; Thomas Okeover
- In office 1422–1423 Serving with Sir Richard Vernon
- Preceded by: Nicholas Goushill; Thomas Okeover
- Succeeded by: Henry Booth; John Curson
- In office 1427–1429 Serving with Henry Booth
- Preceded by: Sir Richard Vernon; John de la Pole
- Succeeded by: John Curson; Gerard Meynell
- In office 1431–1432 Serving with Thomas Mackworth
- Preceded by: John Curson; Gerard Meynell
- Succeeded by: Richard Vernon
- In office 1433–1434 Serving with Sir Richard Vernon
- Preceded by: Richard Vernon
- Succeeded by: John Curson; Gerard Meynell

Member of Parliament for Warwickshire
- In office 1420 – May 1421 Serving with William Peyto
- Preceded by: Sir Thomas Burdet; John Mallory
- In office December 1421 – 1422 Serving with John Chetwynd
- Preceded by: William Holt; John Mallory
- Succeeded by: Sir William Mountfort; Robert Castell

Personal details
- Born: Late 1360s
- Died: 7 June 1438 Pooley Hall, near Polesworth, Warwickshire
- Spouse(s): Margaret; Isabel Shirley
- Occupation: Landowner, politician, soldier

Sir John Cockayne (died 1438) was an English soldier, politician and landowner whose wealth made him a major force in the affairs of Derbyshire under the House of Lancaster. After numerous acts of criminality in concert with other Midlands landowners, he became a member of the Lancastrian affinity centred on John of Gaunt and a supporter of Henry IV. He fought in two campaigns of the Hundred Years War but his violence and lawlessness continued and he was decidedly out of favour during the reign of Henry V. With power less concentrated in the early years of Henry VI, he was able to serve three terms as High Sheriff of Nottinghamshire, Derbyshire and the Royal Forests and to wield considerable power and influence. He represented Derbyshire no less than nine times and Warwickshire twice in the House of Commons of England.

== Background ==
=== Ancestry ===
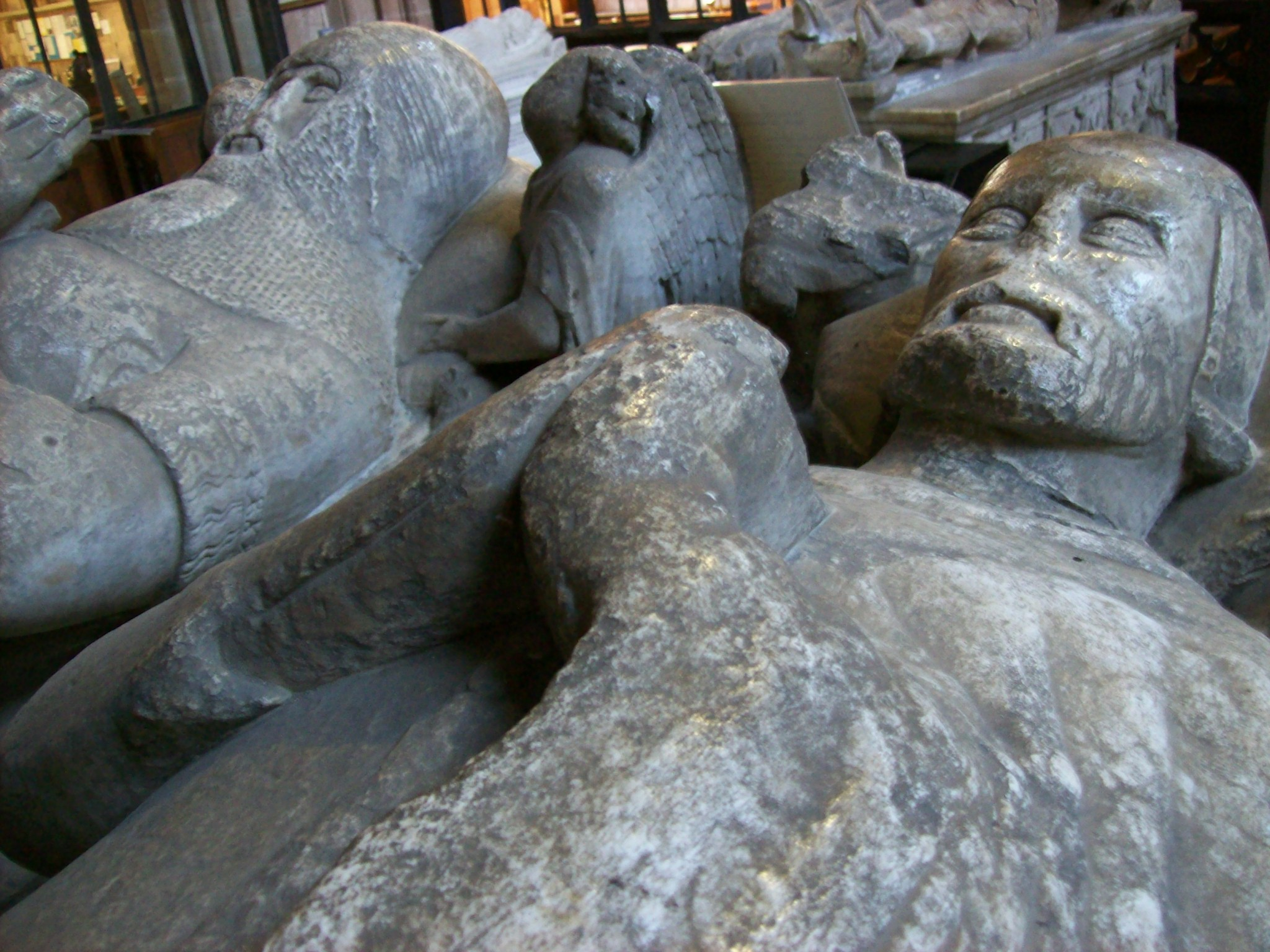
Effigies of John and Edmund Cokayne, Sir John's father and grandfather, in Asbourne parish church.

John Cokayne was the eldest son of

- Edmund Cockayne (died 1403) of Ashbourne Hall Ashbourne, Derbyshire.
- Elizabeth Harthill (died 1416), daughter of Sir Richard Herthil or Harthill (died 1390) of Pooley Hall, near Polesworth, Warwickshire.

The Cockayne family are known to have lived at Ashbourne from the mid-12th century. The Derbyshire historian Stephen Glover wrote that the Cockaynes "resided and flourished for many generations in this town, and had considerable estates in the county, much increased by a match with the heiress of Herthill." His mother's patrimony was to be an important factor in the prominence Sir John Cockayne assumed in his county's affairs, although he did not gain full control of it until after his mother's death. However, the family were already wealthy before the Harthill inheritance, although it has been pointed out that they suffered over several generations from "reduced family income due to the longevity of dowagers," which led to Edmund and his brother John not being knighted in their youth.

The Cokaynes gained considerable advantage over many decades from a close connection with the Duchy of Lancaster, especially under Edward III's son, John of Gaunt. Sir John's grandfather, also Sir John, had been joint custodian with Henry de Haydock of the Duchy lands north of the River Trent under Henry of Grosmont, 1st Duke of Lancaster, including several important estates in Lancashire and Staffordshire, and he was responsible for them during the transition to Gaunt's control.

=== Confusions of identity ===
As his family were unimaginative in their choice of personal names, Sir John Cokayne is often confused with others of the same name.

Sir John was confused by Glover with his uncle Sir John Cokayne (died 1429), appointed an executor by John of Gaunt as "chief seneschall de mes terres et possessions," the post held previously by his father. It was this uncle who was a distinguished lawyer and it was he, not Sir John Cokayne of Ashbourne, who was Chief Baron of the Exchequer throughout the reign of Henry IV, as well as Justice of the Common Pleas from 1406 until 1429, the year of his death. The Chancery rolls have numerous references to him, as he was a very active judge and administrator for several decades. Sometimes he is distinguished from his nephew as John Cokayne the Elder. Glover's confusion arose from his belief that uncle John died in 1403 at the Battle of Shrewsbury, thus leaving his later career unattributable. It was his brother Edmund, Sir John's father, who died in the battle.

Sir John Cockayne's eldest son, also named John and also knighted, is also sometimes confused with him. The problem of identification is considerable, as the son died before his father (dvp or decessit vita patris in genealogical records), so their careers overlap for some decades with no clear chronological span for the younger Sir John to occupy as head of the family. Moreover, Sir John had a second son called Sir John by a different wife, with further confusion.

== Early career ==
=== Armed marauder ===
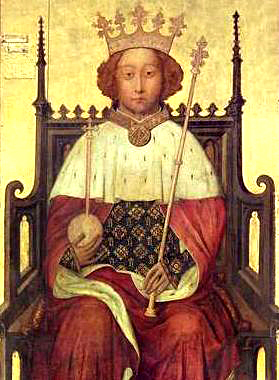
Richard II of England.

Sir John Cokayne first appearance in the history of his region was as a bandit leader in the reign of Richard II. On 26 February 1388, while John of Gaunt was abroad and the Lords Appellant, including Gaunt's son, Henry Bolingbroke, were at the height of their power, Cockayne's name headed the list of a group of young landed gentry accused of "divers enormous offences in the county of Derby, against the ministers, officers and servants of the king's uncle John, duke of Lancaster." It was alleged that they had set an ambush to kill Gaunt's officials. A substantial party of Midlands landowners, headed by Robert de Ferrers, 5th Baron Ferrers of Chartley, was deputed to bring Cockayne and his gang to justice. Among the posse were Sir Walter Blount, a justice of the peace, a veteran of Gaunt's campaigns and his main representative in the region, John Ipstones and Thomas Beek, both rewarded by Gaunt for their service in his campaign for the Crown of Castile. Ipstones had a reputation for violence and had besieged Blount's home with an armed band the previous year during a dispute over a bond that Blount had taken from John Moston, a tenant of Ipstones. This internecine warfare among Gaunt's affinity was a principal part of the wave of violence afflicting the north Midlands, a major embarrassment for Gaunt, who had been arguing in parliament that the great lords' affinities were a force for order. Cokayne's main disruptive activity seems to have been breaking into Gaunt's enclosures. Despite his family links with Gaunt, Cockayne was not at this time part of the duke's affinity: Simon Walker, the historian of the affinity, found no clear evidence of that before 1398, the year of Gaunt's death. The commission to arrest him named nine accomplices and he was said to have a retinue of twenty. However, he soon made friends with some of the very Lancastrian affinity members who had been commissioned to arrest him.

Ipstones had long been involved in a complex dispute over lands at Tean, Staffordshire, and Hopton, Shropshire, which he claimed by right of his mother. The other claimant, Maud Swynnerton, a cousin, was still a child in 1381 when Ipstones seized the manors with the help of Richard Thornbury and John Wollaston. Ipstones seems to have quarrelled with Thornbury, his chief accomplice, as he was granted a pardon for his murder on 13 November 1387. Cokayne was one of those whom he recruited to fill the gaps in his own entourage. Maud continued to uphold her side in the property dispute and, now a widow, was living with Joan Peshale, her mother-in-law, at La Mote, a house within Chetwynd Park in Shropshire. Cokayne joined Ipstones and Beek in abducting Maud from Chetwynd in December 1388. They were said to be "armed as for war," but stole a collection of additional weapons as they took Maud, who was forced to marry William Ipstones, Sir John's son, and made to renounce her claim to the disputed estates. However, Joan Peshale pursued the matter through the courts, alleging that the gang had entered her manor by scaling the walls with ladders, threatened her and her tenants, attacked her servants and abducted a maidservant called Alice Costeyne as well as Maud. Property losses were put at £100. Cokayne was prominently named in all the allegations as well as in the gaol delivery made at Shrewsbury Castle when they were committed for trial in 1390. However, they were acquitted by the jury, probably because of intimidation.

=== Pious purposes ===
In 1392 Cokayne was party to an important donation intended to fund a chantry at St Oswald's Church, Ashbourne. On 18 March he, together with John Kniveton, Roger Bradbourne and Richard Cokayne, granted rents worth 100 shillings a year from the manor of Mercaston to William Hyde, the church's chaplain. In this, they were acting as feoffees for Nicholas Kniveton and the purpose of the chantry was to pray for the souls of the Kniveton family, who were probably relatives of the Cokaynes. Cokayne was involved in the process over some time, as he had witnessed the transfer by feoffees of the Mercaston estate to Johanna, the widow of Nicholas Kniveton, in June 1391. As was customary, the souls of others concerned in the grant were included, and in this case John, Duke of Aquitaine and Lancaster was named, as the manor was held of him, together with John Sheppey, the Dean of Lincoln, who confirmed the grant. Hyde paid £20 for the licence to accept the alienation in mortmain of the rents, a costly privilege because the property passed thereby outside the land market and beyond most royal taxation. With reference to a later donation to set up a chantry at Ashbourne for the Bradbourne family, the local historian Susan Wright comments on the peculiar "intensity of relations, including much intermarriage, among those families with manors between the Dove valley and Derby in the Peak foothills" which was both celebrated and created through such rituals.

=== Responsibility and criminality ===
Cokayne now began to acquire a degree of influence and recognition in Derbyshire society. In March 1392 he received a commission of array. In February 1393 he received a commission of arrest to pursue a fugitive in a case brought to attention by his uncle John. Rituals of social solidarity and political responsibility did not make Cokayne markedly less inclined to consort with criminals. In May John Cokayn, probably the uncle, obtained a pardon for a man involved in a rampage of housebreaking and murder at Ashbourne. Although there is no suggestion in the text that Sir John himself was present on this occasion, the list of those involved overlaps substantially with that of his cronies who had terrorised the area in 1388, including Edmund Harthill, presumably a cousin. Moreover, when Sir John was returned to Parliament for the first time in 1395, he had another indictment for felony hanging over him. While he was at Westminster he had the case transferred to Derbyshire by a writ of nisi prius, which covered also Thomas Lache and William Walsh, both of Normanton, presumably his accomplices. The other knight of the shire in 1395 was Peter Melbourne or Fauconer, a one-time MP who was a close and devoted adherent of Gaunt. It was rare for the Derbyshire gentry to send two inexperienced men to Parliament: generally at least one would have served before.

The dangers of Cokayne's political position must have been apparent to him, not least because of the fate of his close friend Ipstones, murdered while in London for the 1394 Parliament by Roger Swynnerton, a relative of Maud. Moreover, the murderer was pardoned in 1397 after an intervention by Baldwin Raddington, controller of the king's wardrobe. Cokayne was clearly not trusted by the king, Richard II, and the Court party: after his brief period of respectability, he received no commissions after 1393. The Ipstones property dispute had wider resonances in the competition between magnates in the region. The Peshales, Maud's in-laws were clients of the Earls of Stafford, as was Ipstones until 1381, when hostilities broke out between them. Gaunt had intervened to get Sir John Holland restored to favour after he murdered the son of Hugh de Stafford, 2nd Earl of Stafford in 1386, bringing about a deterioration in relations between the two magnates. Stafford had great influence in his own county and his reach came very close to Cokayne's home territory around Dovedale. Cokayne faced the same toxic combination of local infamy, official indifference and magnate hostility that encompassed the death of Ipstones. Lancastrian power was much more dominant in Derbyshire than in Staffordshire, making Gaunt a realistic protector for its gentry.

Arms of John of Gaunt, asserting his kingship over Castile and León, as well as his English and French connections.

However, there is some confusion about Cokayne's developing relations with Gaunt and his affinity. Simon Walker cites him as an example of Gaunt's success in co-opting unruly gentry into the status quo, as he progressed "from breaker of the duke's chases in 1388 to chief steward of the North Parts of his duchy by 1398." The History of Parliament is certain that the latter post was actually occupied by uncle John Cokayne, not Sir John. Moreover, Walker's own listing of Gaunt's officials names "John Cokayn," without mention of knighthood, as chief steward of the North Parts on 4 March 1398 – in line with Gaunt's will, which generally uses titles as appropriate but names his executor and seneschal simply as "Johan Cokeyn." It seems therefore that Sir John himself had in 1398 become simply one of the Lancastrian affinity, with an annuity of 20 marks, drawn on the manor of Daventry. Even this is not attested before that year, although the arrangement may go back some years earlier. Uncle John, however, had progressed to the highest levels in the service of Gaunt and had also made a considerable name for himself in the capital as a lawyer, becoming Recorder of London in 1394 and serjeant-at-law in 1396. His success can only have smoothed the way for his nephew. Both were left in an exposed position when Gaunt died and Sir John bought a pardon in 1398, probably because of his association with Bolingbroke, Gaunt's exiled heir.

== Lancastrian dominance ==
=== Royal favour ===
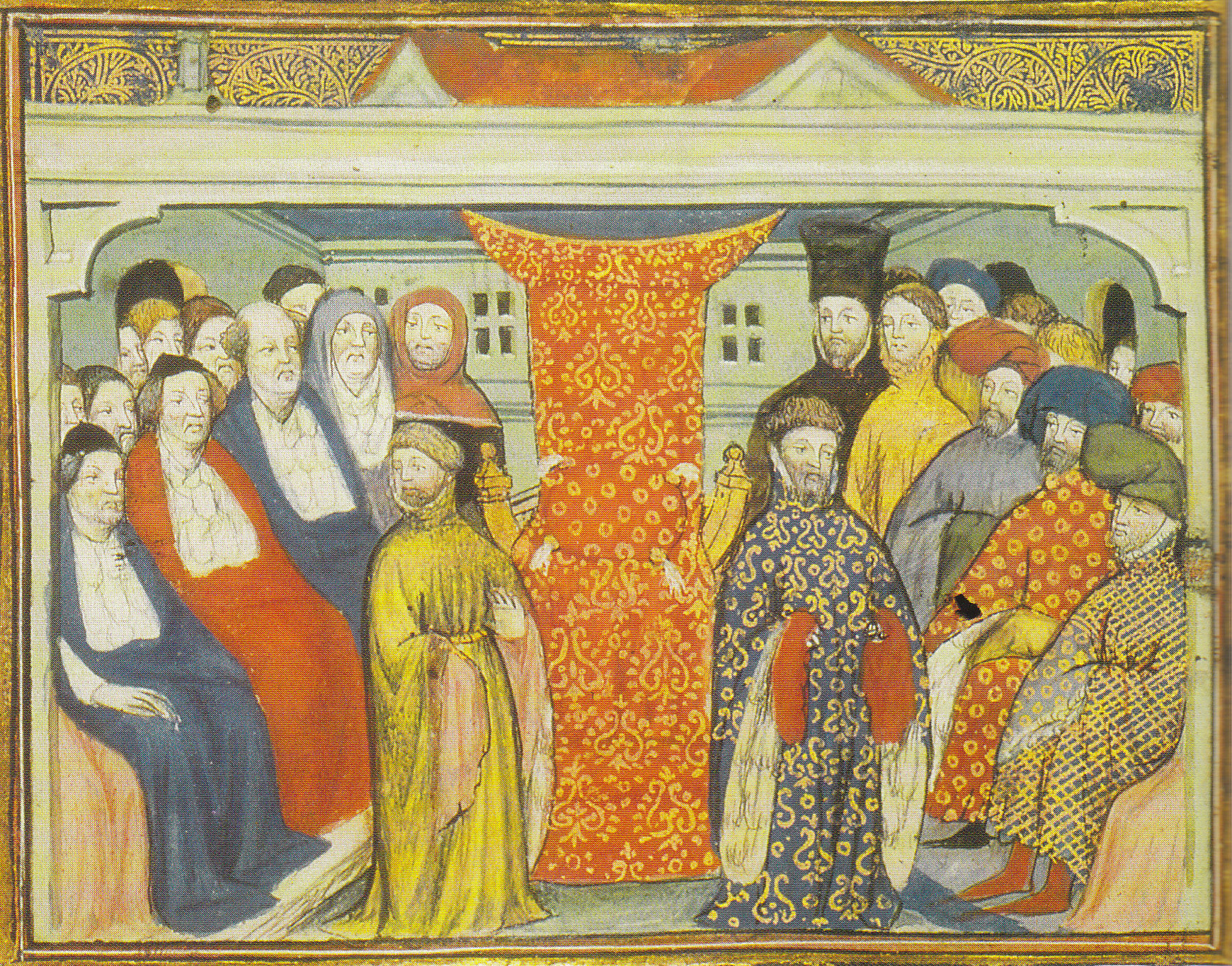
Henry of Bolingbroke claims the throne, 1399.

After Bolingbroke was deprived of his inheritance of the Duchy of Lancaster in March 1399 by the disqualification of his attorneys, he gathered an invasion force and landed in July at Ravenspurn in Holderness. This was apparently chosen for its convenience in meeting and mobilising the Lancastrian affinity and network of duchy officials, who played a major part in bringing the Midlands over to his side. So close was the link between Derbyshire and the House of Lancaster that a third of the Derbyshire MPs of the period were actually in attendance when Bolingbroke landed. It seems that Sir John Cokayne, like his uncle, was a trusted supporter of the uprising and of the new régime from the outset and he must have provided notable services during the seizure of power to be rewarded as he was. After Bolingbroke's accession to the throne as Henry IV, Cokayne was recognised as one of the king's bachelors. His annuity of 20 marks as a Lancastrian retainer was paid for a further year and in October 1400 replaced by one of £60 drawn on Ashbourne, his home town. The sense that he was already the most representative member of the family was reinforced by the practice of naming the distinguished lawyer "uncle" in official documents. Both uncle and knight received the commission of array for Derbyshire, a key military appointment, in December 1399. Although he had not yet inherited the family estates, it was Sir John, not his father, who was called to attend great councils of the realm early in the reign. On 16 May 1401 he was at last made a justice of the peace for Derbyshire. On 11 May 1402 Cokayne was one of the Derbyshire notables commissioned to combat propaganda against Henry IV. The commissioners were to argue publicly that the king was committed to the "common wealth and laws and customs of the realm" and to take action against those "preaching among other things that the king has not kept the promises he made at his advent into the realm and at his coronation."

Cokayne was returned by the county to the 1402 Parliament with Roger Leche, a Derbyshire Lancastrian who had also been called to the councils and was favoured by both the king and Henry, Prince of Wales. The pair's claim for expenses of £26 to cover 65 days' service was authorised on 25 November.

With his father's death, fighting for the king at the Battle of Shrewsbury on 21 July 1403, Sir John came into his patrimony. In September his commission of array for Shropshire was renewed, along with his uncle's, and his commission of the peace was renewed twice in 1404, in March from Westminster and in November from Coventry. St. Mary's Priory in Coventry was the location that month of a Michaelmas Parliament, the second of that year because of royal financial demands, known as the Parliamentum Indoctorum or Unlearned Parliament. This was attended as representatives for Derbyshire by Cokayne and Roger Bradbourne, a Lancastrian who had fought under Gaunt in Spain and welcomed Bolingbroke at Ravenspurn but was not apparently a paid part of the Lancastrian retinue. The two members claimed expenses totalling £16 for 40 days' service, authorised by a writ issued on 12 November.

During the parliament Cokayne was accused by a group of four feoffees of violently seizing the manor of Baddesley Ensor in Warwickshire. The accusers included figures of the greatest importance in the realm: Lawrence Allerthorpe, a former Lord High Treasurer, William Gascoigne, the Chief Justice, Robert Waterton, one of a long-serving family of Lancastrian retainers who held the key manor and castle of Pontefract for the dynasty and had played a key part in Bolingbroke's return to England, and John West. They claimed that Cokayne had entered the manor with "deux centz gentz arraiez a faire de guerre", that is to say, "200 men dressed for warfare". The king ordered him to appear before his council at Westminster the following May. The Harthill family had held land at Baddesley Ensor since the late 13th century, when Richard de Hertewell, still a minor, is mentioned as an heir to Thomas de Edensor, the previous and eponymous lord of the manor. Sir Richard Harthill, Cokayne's maternal grandfather, made various settlements of land at the manor, some of them slightly mysterious, before his death. Secondary sources appear to minimise the issue. The History of Parliament avers that Sir John escaped punishment because of the "proven validity of his claim to the property, which his mother had recently inherited," while the Victoria County History maintains that he "may merely have been too previous in his entry, as in 1417 Elizabeth, widow of Edmund Cokayn, daughter and heir of Richard de Herthill, released to John Cokayn, her son, all right in the manor." The manor formed part of the patrimony of Elizabeth, Sir John Cokayne's mother, and was retained by her throughout her lifetime. She did not voluntarily release it to Sir John: 1417, when it was quitclaimed to her son with the rest of her estates, was the year after her death. It is unclear whether Sir John was acting in his own or his mother's interests, but past behaviour shows that he was not averse to using armed force to dispossess women. If he had a right to the property, it is unclear why he needed to use an armed force of 200 to occupy it. Clearly he did not prevail, even if he did avoid punishment, as the manor did not fall into his hands for more than decade.

=== Military service ===
Cokayne now found it prudent to enlist with the king's son, Thomas of Lancaster for military operations in the English Channel. This was during a lull in the Hundred Years' War, without major warfare between England and France, but with both sides sponsoring proxies. The French monarchy supported the Glyndŵr Rising and aristocratic plotting, the so-called Tripartite Indenture, as well as privateering to destabilise Henry IV. The king appointed his son admiral and large ships were requisitioned and in April Cokayne obtained letters of protection to embark, probably on this occasion taking with him a party of 12 archers.

The following year Cokayne again served under Thomas of Lancaster, who on 17 March 1406 was made responsible for operations to intercept rebels who were travelling across the North of England to link up with Owain Glyndŵr in Wales. It was alleged many were doing this, pretending to be on their way to join the forces led by the Prince of Wales. In Derbyshire Cokayne who was one of the Lancastrian knights commissioned to aid Thomas, along with the bailiffs of Derby.

=== Power struggles and imprisonment ===
Although Cokayne received the commission of the peace in January 1406, it was not renewed the following year and he was not to serve as a JP again for a decade. However, he was still called upon to enforce the law where armed force might be necessary. In October 1408 he was sent to support the sheriff, Thomas Foljambe, in restoring order at Chesterfield, where a group of tradesmen were refusing to accept the authority of the town's bailiff and of the bailiff of Joan, the widow of Thomas Holland, 3rd Earl of Kent. In April 1410 he was commissioned with other gentry to arrest Henry Pierrepont, a turbulent landowner with interests at Chesterfield and in Nottinghamshire. Pierrepont was a close associate of Roger Leche, another Chesterfield landowner, and it seems that the bonds of locality and kinship in that part of Derbyshire now began to work against Cokayne.

Cokayne was involved in a series of disorders over the succeeding years. In August 1410 he gathered an armed force of 200 around his home at Ashbourne. He claimed later, when obtaining a pardon the cover the events, that he had received reports of a plot against his life and that Roger Leche was on his way with an armed band to kill him. The precise reasons for the distrust between the two men are obscure. Leche had been chamberlain to Bolingbroke as Earl of Derby and had succeeded another Derbyshire man, John Curzon of Kedleston, as steward of the main Lancastrian stronghold in the region, Tutbury Castle. He had become particularly close to the Prince of Wales, acting as steward of his household. He had a history of turning up with armed supporters when involved in what were supposed to be peaceful occasions. It is likely that some kind of personal enmity had developed between him and Cokayne. However, his loyalty to the Prince of Wales placed him on the opposite side of a political divide that had opened up within the House of Lancaster and among its supporters. It had become apparent in the parliament of 1410, which insisted on the king appointing to his council "the most valiant, wise and discreet lords of the realm." This was coded support for the active policies favoured by the Prince, frustrated by his experiences as captain of Calais, and his closest confidants, his uncles Sir Thomas Beaufort, the Chancellor and Henry Beaufort, the Bishop of Winchester. This contrasted with a more cautious approach in the council, associated with Archbishop Thomas Arundel and the Prince's brother, Thomas of Lancaster. Cokayne had apparently chosen several times to serve under Thomas and was to do so again. The quarrel between Leche and Cokayne seems to have been prolonged and dangerous to the peace.

On 24 October 1411 the king's council issued orders for the Constable of the Tower or his lieutenant to receive Cokayne into custody, together with several other Derbyshire and Nottinghamshire knights. Cokayne's imprisonment coincided with apparent triumph of the faction headed by the Beauforts and the Prince and their policy of engagement in the Armagnac–Burgundian Civil War. Only two days earlier an English expedition had accompanied John the Fearless, the Duke of Burgundy, in taking Paris. However, it is unlikely Cokayne was the victim of a political purge, as Leche was included with him in the round-up. Neither headed the list: rather it was Thomas Chaworth, who had been involved in a violent feud with Sir Walter Tailboys. Then came Richard Stanhope and John Zouche, who had a bitter property dispute of their own, which also involved John Leek, who completed the list. John Finderne was added by a separate letter. The imprisoned knights may all have been involved in the quarrel between Cokayne and Leche or the internecine Lancastrian rivalries but the principle of selection may simply have been one of removing gentry miscreants temporarily from the region. On 6 November the constable was informed of arrangements for the trial of the imprisoned men and not until 30 November, after they had been kept out of circulation for more than five weeks, was their release ordered.

=== Service in France ===
While Cokayne and the other knights were still in the Tower of London, the king initiated a quiet coup to remove his opponents from power. On 11 November he made Thomas of Lancaster head of his council in place of the Prince of Wales and, with the acquiescence of the Michaelmas parliament, went on to remove Thomas Beaufort as chancellor, replacing him with Arundel, his predecessor. This led to a reversal of foreign policy and in 1412 Cokayne went to France with a force led by Thomas of Lancaster, now Duke of Clarence, in pursuance of an accord made at Bourges with the Armagnac faction: an expedition that paid the knights 2 shillings per day. Before departure he made a will at Pooley, placing the manor of Middleton-by-Wirksworth in the hands of feoffees for the use of his daughter, Alice. He also appointed Sir John Dabrichecourt a feoffee for his interest in the manor of Baddesley Ensor, with the aim of raising a sum towards the marriage of his younger daughter Elyn. Any residue he hoped would be devoted to chantries for his family at Polesworth and Ashbourne. He probably served in central France and Aquitaine until the death of Henry IV, when Clarence returned to England, after the French factions made temporary peace among themselves and bought off the English.

=== Continuing feuds ===
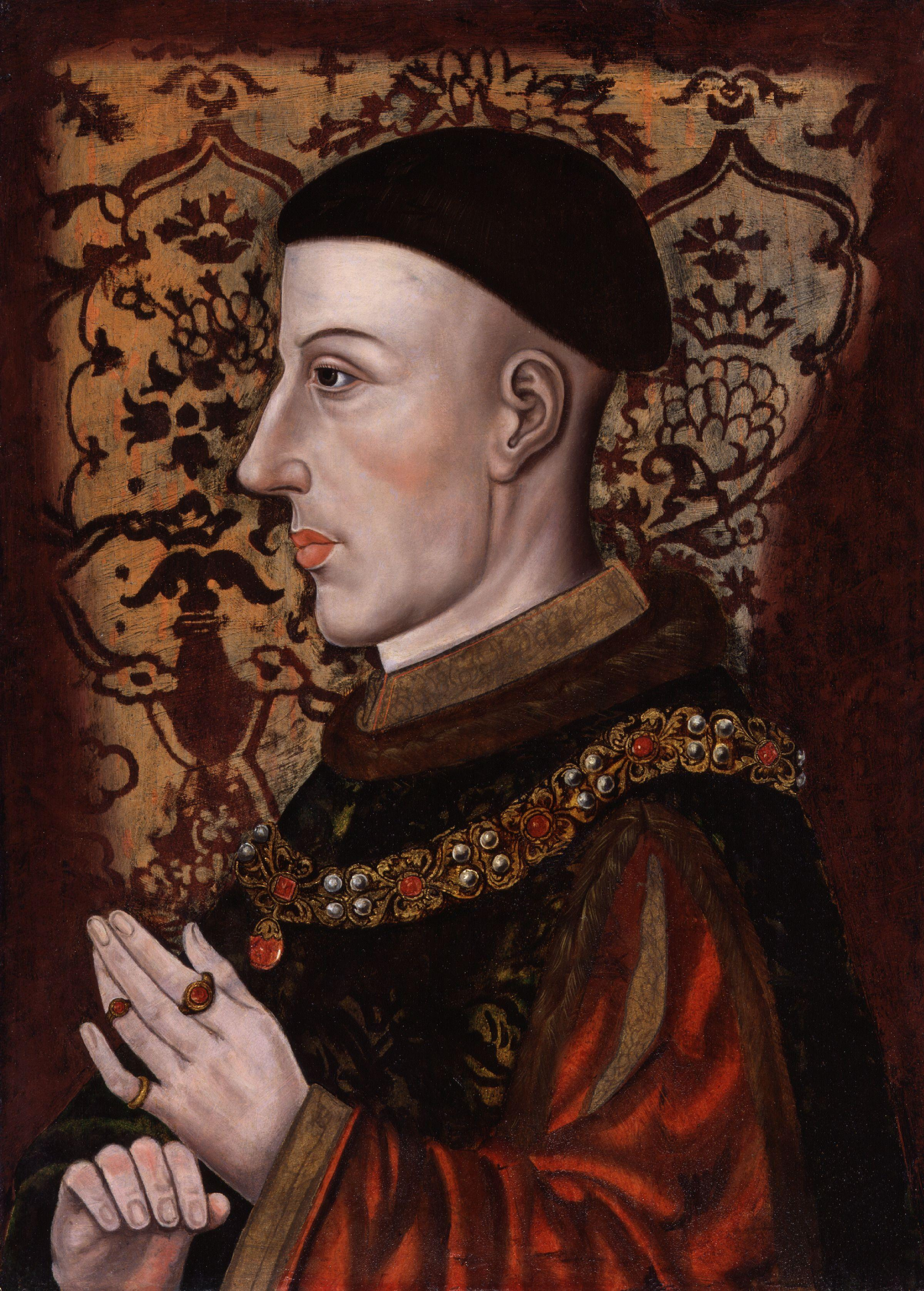
Henry V.

The new reign apparently brought little change in Cokayne's involvement with local and regional disputes. At Michaelmas 1414 the sheriff was ordered to produce Cokayne, John Blount, the prior of Gresley Priory and 50 others, at the following Trinity sessions in Derby to answer charges of "divers extortions, conspiracies and insurrections," However, at Stafford he was named as arbitrator in a convoluted and bitter quarrel between Hugh Erdeswyk, recently MP for Staffordshire, and Edmund de Ferrers, 6th Baron Ferrers of Chartley. Probably originating as a property dispute, this had become a contest for local hegemony, involving the Peshales. Cokayne was nominated by Erdeswyk: at this point Ferrers was demanding forfeit of a bond for 500 marks. Neither Ferrers nor Erdeswyk ultimately suffered any great loss. Early in 1415 Cokayne himself appeared in court at Derby in connection with his 1410 dispute with Leche, but was able to produce a general pardon he had purchased.

Cokayne received few commissions under Henry V, although they did include the important commissions of array for Warwickshire in May 1418 and March 1419. He is not known to have played a part in Henry V's campaigns in France, although his son, also John, did serve in France under Richard Grey, 4th Baron Grey of Codnor. Instead he continued his private local warfare. In August 1419 he used armed force to seize manors on the Derbyshire-Leicestershire border belonging to John Finderne, including Stretton en le Field. Finderne had acted as a lawyer for the Duchy of Lancaster and it appears that Cokayne was now making a habit of harassing its local officials. Under examination by the king's council, he claimed that he and others had an interest in Stretton, but the local coroner was ordered to return it to Finderne's control.

By the time the Stretton dispute was settled in December 1419, Cokayne had attended his fourth parliament for Derbyshire. He was also elected for the next three, alternating between Derbyshire and Warwickshire, where he was now a major landowner following his mother's death. At the 1419 parliament he made mainprise for Dame Eleanor Dagworth. She was involved in disputes because of the treason of Sir John Mortimer, her second husband, who upheld the claim of Edmund Mortimer, 5th Earl of March to the throne. The list of mainpernours was illustrious, including the soldier Sir Thomas Erpingham and John Pelham, a member of the king's council, as well as the Staffordshire MP and Derbyshire landowner Sir Richard Vernon. Mortimer was to be executed in 1424, not directly for treason but for escaping from custody.

== Later career ==
=== Networks of power ===
During the minority of Henry VI Cokayne emerged very quickly from the disfavour of Henry V's reign and was able to achieve considerable influence by exploiting his relationships with those powerful at the centre and in his locality. In December 1422 he was one of a team of local gentry commissioned to investigate breaches of the laws restricting the taking of salmon and lampreys, particularly the young fish, from the River Trent. As early as February 1423 he was appointed Sheriff, a post shared between Derbyshire and Nottinghamshire and most often occupied by a Nottinghamshire man. This was an onerous and expensive honour, but it gave considerable influence, particularly in returning MPs and determining the composition of juries. Cokayne held the shrievalty again for an unusually extended period from November 1428 to February 1430 and during 1435. Similarly, he soon became a JP again in Derbyshire, commissioned on 7 July 1423, while serving as sheriff. This was renewed in July 1424 and May 1425, the latter commission lasting until July 1429. After a break, he was made a JP for Derbyshire again in June 1431 and remained so for the rest of his life. He was also commissioner of array for Derbyshire in 1427.

Cokayne was now a wealthy man, with estates valued at £200 in 1436, although he lent only £19 13s. 4d. to the king for prosecution of the war effort in 1430. He was one of those commissioned to promote the loan in Derbyshire. The only other contribution from the shire was 20 marks from Sir Nicholas Montgomery, who was much less wealthy than Sir John but seems to have felt he must set an example, as he had been commissioned to solicit loans in neighbouring Staffordshire. Cokayne's new patron Ralph de Cromwell, 3rd Baron Cromwell had also been commissioned to raise funds in Derbyshire but his contribution was returned under Lincolnshire, where headed the list with nearly £6000.

The Duchy of Lancaster, like the Crown, was no longer a distinct force in Derbyshire, so the immensely rich Cromwell, with a base in the east of the county, was a useful counterweight to the power of the Greys and Staffords. Cromwell was a prominent member of the royal household and one of the dominant small nucleus in the council. Cokayne allowed himself to be drawn into the complex property deals and lawsuits of Cromwell and his circle. One of Cokayne's services was to pledge support for Cromwell's prosecution of John Grey, Baron Grey of Codnor, over his claim to the manor of Crich in Derbyshire. This took place in 1430 but is known from a long and complicated exemplification obtained by Cromwell in 1433, which shows the breadth of his dealings in the region, with numerous Derbyshire and Nottinghamshire estates claimed by himself or his representatives. Cromwell had obtained judgement against Grey the previous summer but when he launched his prosecution, with the support of Cokayne and his own lawyers, he was still having difficulty in actually gaining possession of Crich.

Cokayne's involvement with Cromwell then drew him into the affairs of Lincolnshire. Walter Tailboys, a neighbour and client of Cromwell, together with some of his relatives and friends, had initiated an assize of novel disseisin. Eight plaintiffs and four defendants were named, although others were involved, and a number of tenements were at stake on or close to the Lincolnshire coast, at Theddlethorpe, Mablethorpe, Saltfleetby, Strubby, Carlton, Gayton and Withern, suggesting a contest between groups of property speculators. The plaintiffs had triumphed at the initial hearing and the defendants had decided to come to terms. They promised to accept the judgement and make a quitclaim, but wanted to limit their losses. Both sides seem to have recruited guarantors among serving MPs: the 1431 parliament, which was Cokayne's tenth, was assembling as the legal process continued. The defendants obtained recognizances to guarantee their quitclaim from John Culpepper, just elected MP for Rutland, and from Thomas Strange, a Midlands landowner. Cokayne agreed to enter into a recognizance of £1000 in Derbyshire to guarantee that Tailboys would press the issue no further after the judgement had been affirmed. This was matched by Sir Richard Stanhope, then serving as MP for Nottinghamshire, whose wife Maud was Lord Cromwell's daughter. It was later alleged that about this time Cromwell had illegally tried to recruit Cokayne, Vernon and others into his affinity by offering them his livery.

=== Elections and disorder ===
In his later years, Cokayne became closely allied to Sir Richard Vernon. The Vernon family were the wealthiest and most powerful of the Derbyshire gentry, with large and widely spread estates, more like those of the local nobility. Sir Richard Vernon was too powerful to be easily absorbed into one of the aristocratic affinities but not strong enough to stand entirely alone. Cokayne, in a similar position, negotiated the tricky waters of politics in the king's minority alongside Vernon and often in close alliance with him. At the county's parliamentary election in 1432 he sealed the indenture returning Richard Vernon, Sir Richard's son, and at about the same time arranged the betrothal of his heir, John, to Vernon's daughter Anne.

During this period Vernon, Cokayne and Henry Grey, Baron Grey of Codnor, were the decisive influences in the choice of knights of the shire, generally in collusion, although Humphrey Stafford also took a close interest. However, in 1433 the tacit collaboration between the gentry and Grey broke down. In April Grey sought a closer alliance by granting his livery to both Cokayne and Vernon. However, the county was already in a state of great tension, with a major dispute between the Foljambe and Pierrepont families overshadowing other issues. This did not reach a climax until 1 January 1434 at Chesterfield parish church, when Sir Henry Pierrepont was maimed and two of his companions killed. Subsequently, through the interpretations of two separate grand juries set before a commission of oyer and terminer at Derby in March and a trial the following month, the previous year's events were filtered into rival and shifting narratives. Cokayne and Vernon were part of a jury that upheld Thomas Foljambe's version of events. Grey was indicted for bringing a force of 200 men to Derby on 24 June 1433 to hinder the county election. However, Vernon and Cokayne were also indicted for turning out a force of 300 to take the county seats for themselves – the last time either would sit in Parliament. There was no direct connection between the contested election and the sensational murders but at the time there seemed to be a pattern of widespread violence and intimidation which both sides sought to use in justification. The 1433 Parliament had agreed that "no Lorde, nor none other persone, of what estate, degree or condition that he be, shal wetyngly receyve, cherishe, hold in household, ne maynteyne" criminals of any sort. To that end it had specifically forbidden the granting of livery and the maintenance of retinues as part of a general condemnation of intimidation in judicial and political affairs. Ironically, it was Grey, together with Vernon and Cokayne, described as "knights of the shire," who were in May 1434 commissioned under the terms of the act to take oaths from a large number of Derbyshire men, pledging themselves not to maintain peace breakers.

Despite his role in the turbulence afflicting the county, Cokayne remained a trusted agent of government and order to the end of his life. He was again commissioned to help raise a loan on 24 February 1436 and made a commissioner of array on 6 August of that year.

== Landowner ==
Family tree to illustrate the complexities of the Harthill inheritance

Based on the pedigrees in Pedigrees from the Plea Rolls.

Alice Astley	Richard Harthill of Harthill and Pooley	Mary	Otto Worthington
Giles	Edmund Cokayne of Ashbourne	Elizabeth Harthill	John Francis
William	Sir John Cokayne of Ashbourne	Edmund Cokayne	Richard Cokayne	Thomas Cokayne	George Cokayne

Relief map of Derbyshire to show locations of the main estates inherited by Sir John Cokayne from his father (blue dot) and mother (red dots).
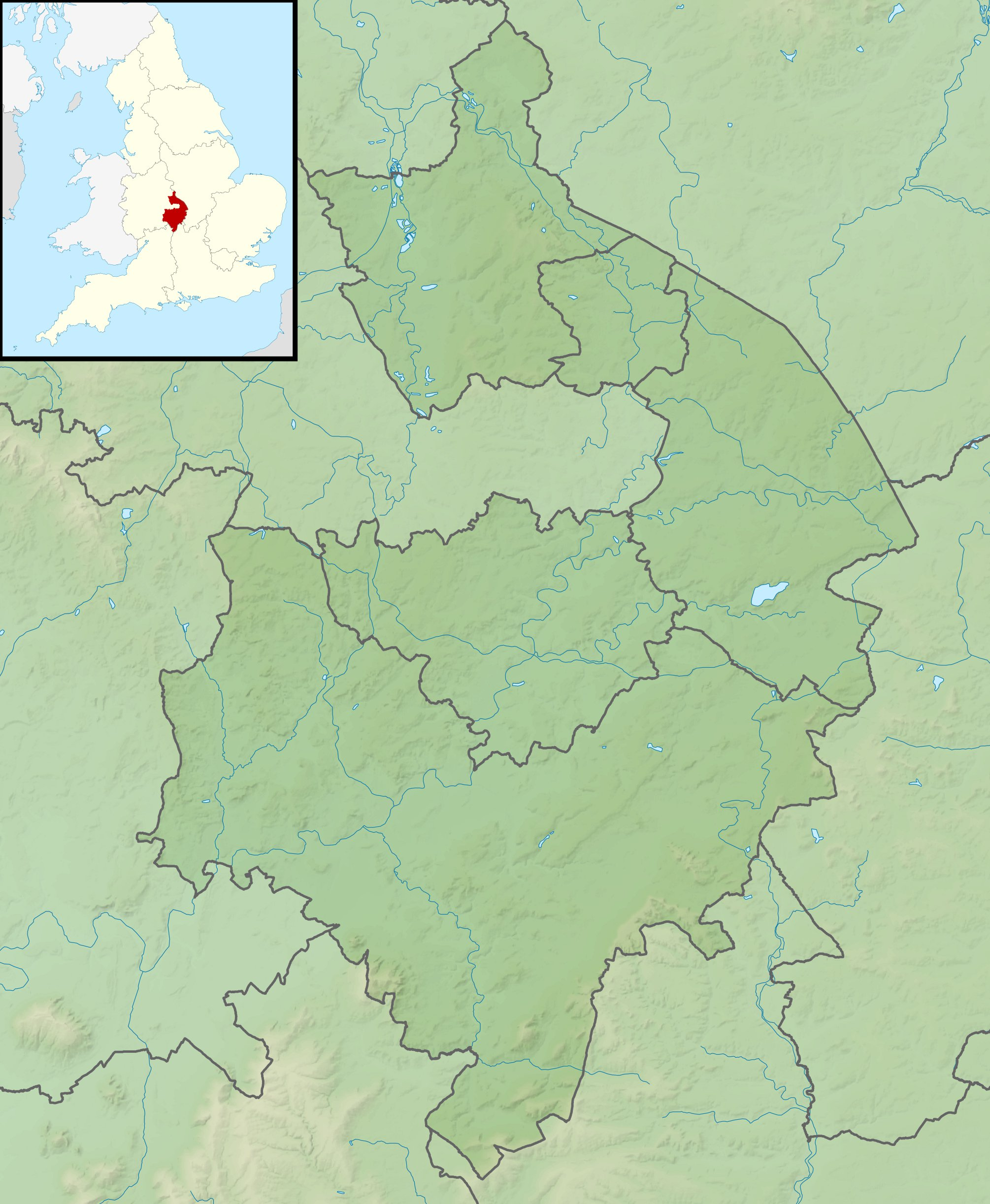
Relief map of Warwickshire to show locations of the main estates inherited by Sir John Cokayne from his mother (red dots).

In 1412 Cokayne's income from his Derbyshire lands was put at £40, compared with an annuity of £60 he was still drawing from Ashbourne ex concessione domini regis pro termino vite sue (as a grant from his lord the king to the end of his life) as a Lancastrian retainer.

The extension of his estates through the Harthill inheritance was for long uncertain. At the death of his grandfather, Richard Harthill, there was still a male heir in the family, a ten-year-old grandson called William, who was intended to inherit the majority of the estates. Richard had appointed feoffees to ease the transition, although there were reports that the tenants had no connection with the feoffees and an inquisition post mortem decided that Pooley and the rest ought to escheat to the king during William's minority. In March 1401 an inquiry was held at Tamworth, Staffordshire, into the age of William and it transpired that he was 21, old enough to take over his estates, although he his wardship was still held by Roger Sapurton. Only with the death of William sine prole in the summer of 1402 could it be certain that his aunt Elizabeth, Sir John Cokayne's mother, would inherit. However, matters were still far from straightforward. For example, an inquisition at Tamworth on 10 August found that Elizabeth's stepmother, Mary, was still alive and held a third of the estate at Newton Regis. After the death of Edmund Cokayne in 1403, Elizabeth married John Francis (also rendered Franceys and Fraunceys) of Ingleby, apparently in the same year, She and Francis settled the manor of Harthill on Sir John Cockayne at about the time of their marriage but Elizabeth seems to have been in no hurry to hand over any more of her inheritance to her son. The quitclaim dated 21 April 1416 but issued on 5 May 1417, after her death, listed the manors and properties that made up the Harthill inheritance.

During the final two decades of his life, but only then, Cokayne was a major landowner with a substantial collection of properties in three counties.

=== Derbyshire ===
- Ashbourne. Although the manor was under the lordship of the Duchy of Lancaster, the Cokaynes had been resident and held considerable property in Ashbourne over several centuries, with their most important seat at Ashbourne Hall. Sir John Cokayne also drew his annuity on lands in the manor.
- Parwich. Cokayne is listed as holding Parwich in 1431 and it was not apparently part of the Harthill inheritance, so must have been acquired by Sir John himself on an earlier Cokayne.
- Thorpe. Thorpe, like Parwich, was held by Cokayne in 1431 but apparently not inherited from the Harthills.
- Middleton-by-Wirksworth was held in 1431 by Cokayne, who inherited it from his mother, as he did the remaining Derbyshire properties.
- Ballidon
- Tissington
- Harthill Cokayne inherited a considerable residence in this manor.
- Alport. The quitclaim of Elizabeth Francis mentions that the Harthill inheritance included the valuable watermill at Alport, at the foot of Lathkill Dale.

=== Staffordshire ===
- Calton. His mother's bequest included the revenues and feudal services of Calton, northwest of Ashbourne, but does not mention the manor itself.

=== Warwickshire ===
- Baddesley Ensor was held of the Earl of Warwick.
- Newton Regis. The manor of Newton Regis was divided in two in 1259 and the Harthill inheritance consisted of a moiety. Of this a third was still occupied by Mary, Richard Harthill's second wife, and her new husband Otto Worthington, as late as 1427.
- Pooley. Like Baddesley Ensor, Pooley had come into the Harthill family from Thomas de Edensor. Mary Harthill tried to claim a third of it as part of her dower in 1404, but unsuccessfully.

== Marriage and family ==
Sir John Cokayne married twice.

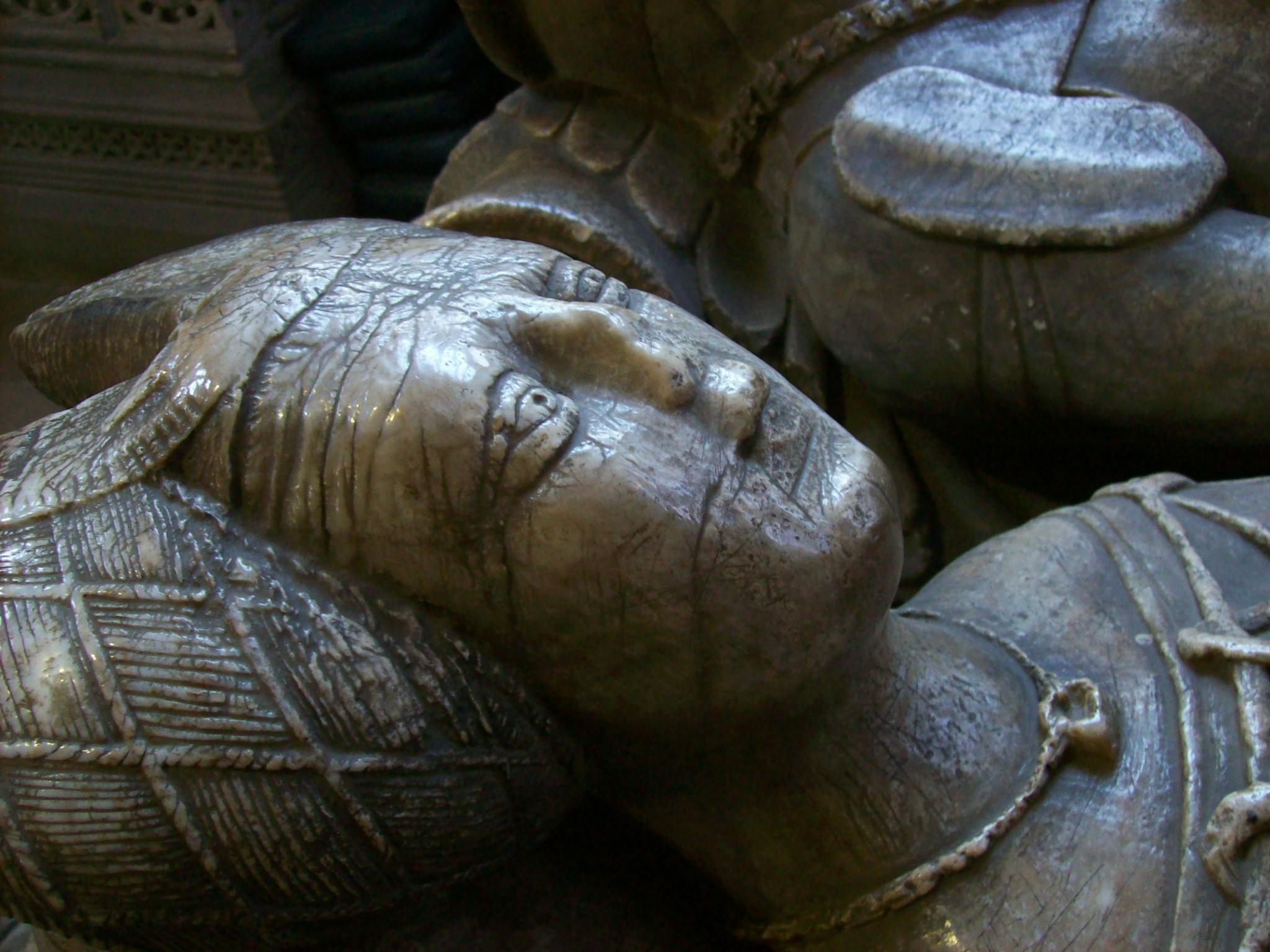
Effigy of Margaret Cokayne, Ashbourne.

By his first wife, Margaret, he had a son and a daughter.

- Sir John Cokayne the younger died before his father. He married Joan, the daughter of Sir John Dabrichecourt of Markeaton, a wealthy Derbyshire Lancastrian landowner and a partisan of Thomas of Lancaster, who died during the French campaign of 1415.
- Alice Cokayne married Sir Ralph Shirley, a wealthy landowner with estates in Warwickshire, Derbyshire and Nottinghamshire, who sat as MP for Leicestershire in 1420.

His second wife was Isabel Shirley, whom he had married by 1422 at the latest, was the daughter of Sir Hugh Shirley and sister of Sir Ralph. Cokayne's second wife and Alice, his eldest daughter, were thus sisters-in-law. As Isabel was of a different generation from Sir John, she long outlived him, surviving at least into the 1460s. By Isabel he had another family of four sons and two daughters, most prominent being:

- John Cokayne, the second son so-named, who would have been a minor when his father died. He married Anne or Agnes Vernon and was later knighted. Like his father, he seems to have lived to a considerable old age and died in 1504.

Family tree to illustrate the succession to Sir John Cokayne

Based on the pedigree in The Genealogist, 1891, with additional information from relevant entries in the History of Parliament.

Sir Hugh Shirley (c.1362-1403) of Lower Ettington and Shirley	Beatrice Brewes of Wiston
Margaret	Sir John Cokayne (died 1438) of Ashbourne	Isabel Shirley	Thomas Bate
Joan Bassett of Brailsford	Sir Ralph Shirley (1391-c.1443) of Lower Ettington and Shirley	Alice Cokayne (died 1466)	Sir John Cokayne dvp	Joan Dabrichecourt of Markeaton	Sir John Cokayne (died 1504) of Ashbourne	Agnes Vernon
Ralph Shirley (died 1466) of Lower Ettington and Shirley	Ralph Shirley	Anne Barlow of Barlow	Thomas Cokayne of Ashbourne
Ralph Shirley of Wiston	Barbara Fitzherbert	Sir Thomas Cokayne of Ashbourne

== Death ==
Towards the end of his life Cokayne was preoccupied by questions of inheritance and the consequent family disputes. He was possibly aware of his impending death when in the Spring of 1438 he levied a fine of lands to compel the tenants of his manors of Calton, Staffordshire, and Ballidon, Derbyshire, to recognise the rights of Isabel, his second wife, as joint landholder. He had conditionally leased Ballidon to John and Robert Taylor, two local men, the previous year, probably in preparation for this legal stratagem. Similarly Calton was leased to Richard Bingham and Richard Bromley, who agreed to recognise John and Isabel as joint holders of the estate. Bingham and John Manchester were similarly used as lessees to levy fines on other Derbyshire and Warwickshire properties. The aim seems to have been to speed Isabel's succession on Cokayne's death but to secure the estates in tail male, thus avoiding losses due to his heir's minority.

On his death bed at his Warwickshire seat, Pooley, Cokayne was compelled to send for his friends and relatives Henry and Robert Kniveton to attest to his financial position and property dealings because of an argument between Isabel and his daughter Alice. The Knivetons seem to have been among feoffees he employed to handle his property: Henry was involved in transferring a small grant of land and houses around Ashbourne he had left to John Bate, dean of the Church of St Editha, Tamworth.

Cokayne died on 7 June 1438 and was buried in the parish church at Ashbourne, next to his first wife. A writ of diem clausit extremum was issued on 19 June. The inquisitions post mortem were held in the autumn and on 6 February 1439 the escheator of Staffordshire ordered to release Calton to Isabel, and the escheators of Derbyshire and Warwickshire to release the remaining estates.

The legal disputes between Isabel and the rest of the family continued. Early in 1439 Joan, the widow of Sir John's deceased eldest son, issued a writ for the arrest of Isabel on a charge of debt and, although it was not executed locally, she was detained in London and brought to court during Trinity term. The case was transferred to Coventry under a writ of nisi prius and Isabel was released on the technicality that her place of residence was wrongly recorded in the original writ. One of those who stood surety for Isabel in London was Richard Bingham, the lessee of Calton, and another Thomas Bate, a lawyer employed by Humphrey Stafford. Bate and Isabel later married and are recorded as husband and wife in 1446, recognising the rights of John Cokayne the younger, who had granted the manor of Middleton to Isabel for her life after levying fine of lands on Middleton and Harthill.

== See also ==
- Bastard feudalism
