= John Coke (died 1650) =

English politician

Sir John Coke (1607–1650) was an English politician who sat in the House of Commons of England from 1640 to 1650. He supported the Parliamentarian side during the English Civil War.

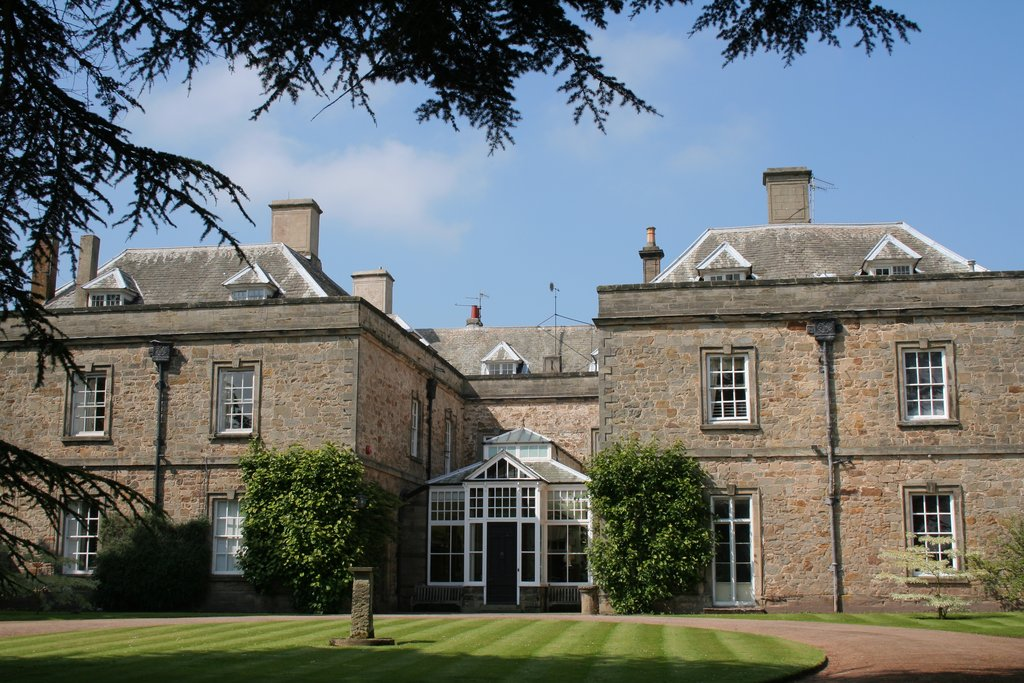
Melbourne Hall, Derbyshire

Coke was the son of Sir John Coke of Melbourne Hall and his wife Mary Powell, daughter of John Powell of Presteigne, Herefordshire. His father was an MP and secretary to King Charles I. Coke lived at Melbourne Hall after his father gave it up for him and was knighted during the lifetime of his father.

In November 1640, Coke was elected Member of Parliament for Derbyshire for the Long Parliament He held the seat until his death in 1650.

Coke was a member of the committee of sequestrators appointed for Derbyshire on 31 March 1645 and of another for raising money for the maintenance of Fairfax's army during 1644. In 1646 he was one of the receivers for the money raised for disbanding the forces in Derbyshire. He was then one of the nine commissioners appointed to take charge of King Charles I after he had been captured and handed over by the Scots. The commissioners remained with the king at Holdenby House Northamptonshire and went with him to Hampton Court Palace where he escaped.

After the execution of the King, Coke went to Paris, where he died at the age of 43.

Coke married Elizabeth Willoughby, widow of W Willoughby and daughter of Timothy Pussey on 25 July 1633 and died without issue. His brother Thomas Coke who was his heir was MP for Leicester.

Parliament of England
Preceded by Sir John Curzon, 1st Baronet; John Manners	Member of Parliament for Derbyshire; 1640–1650; With: Sir John Curzon, 1st Baronet	Succeeded by Gervase Bennet; Nathaniel Barton
