= Edward Gell =

Edward Gell was an English politician who served as a Member of Parliament (MP) for Derbyshire during the First Protectorate Parliament from 1654 to 1656.

== Early life ==
Little is known about Edward Gell's early life, including his exact date and place of birth. He was part of the influential Gell family of Hopton, Derbyshire, known for their involvement in lead mining and ownership of Hopton Hall and significant land holdings in the region.

Gell is listed as 'Edward Gill esq;' in the catalogue of the names of all such who were 'summon'd to Parliament' in 1654, for the county of Derbyshire.

== Political career ==
Edward Gell's most notable political role was as one of four MPs for Derbyshire in the First Protectorate Parliament, which sat from 1654 to 1655. This parliament was convened by Oliver Cromwell during the Commonwealth of England, following his assumption of power as Lord Protector.

Gell served alongside Nathaniel Barton, Thomas Sanders, and John Gell. He was not re-elected for the next parliament.
