= John Cokayne =

John Cokayne may refer to:

- John Cokayne (died 1429) (c. 1360–1429), English judge and administrator
- John Cokayne (died 1438), English soldier, politician and landowner
