= Philip Okeover =

English politician

Sir Philip Okeover (died c. 1400) was an English politician and soldier. He sat as MP for Derbyshire in May 1382 and 1391. He was knighted by April 1379.

== Family ==
He was the son and heir of Sir Thomas Okeover (died by 1372). He married Elizabeth, the daughter of Roger, Lord Grey of Ruthin and by June 1372, he married his second wife, Alice and had at least two sons (Thomas and John). His son Thomas also sat as MP for Derbyshire.

== Biography ==
Okeover served as a soldier and in 1370, it seems to have been that his first experience of warfare overseas was when he campaigned with John, Duke of Lancaster in Aquitaine. He took part in the expedition Lancaster led to Spain in 1386. In 1375, he crossed to Brittany in the company of Edward, Lord Dispenser. In both 1380 and 1381, he served with Sir Hugh Calveley who was fighting in northern France.

As early as 1373, he sued a local woman for trespassing on his estates at Mappleton.
