= Thomas Wensley =

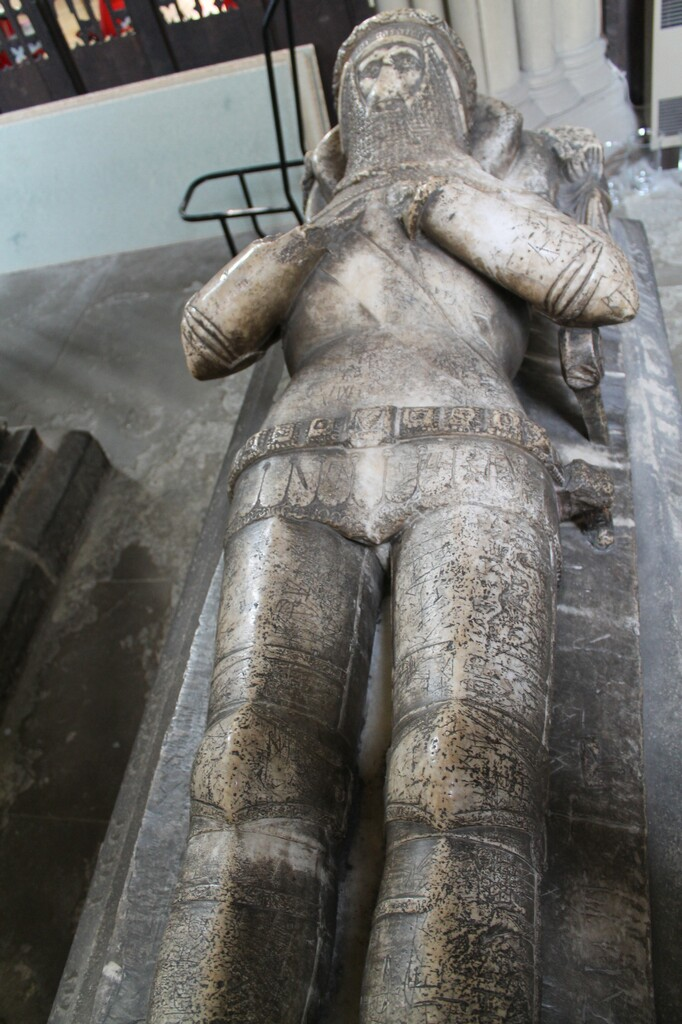
Effigy of Thomas Wensley, All Saints' Church, Bakewell, Derbyshire

Arms of Wendesley: Ermine, on a bend gules three escallops argent

Sir Thomas Wensley (or Wendesley; died 1403) of Wensley in Derbyshire, served five times as a Member of Parliament for Derbyshire, in 1382, 1384, 1386, 1390 and 1394. He was a follower of John of Gaunt, 1st Duke of Lancaster and was killed on 21 July 1403, fighting at the Battle of Shrewsbury for the Lancastrian cause.

== Career ==
He was a son of Roger Wensley, about whom little is recorded. He served as Steward and Constable of the High Peak, Derbyshire, and for the Duchy of Lancaster. He was knighted between 1382–4.

== Marriage and issue ==
He married a wife of unrecorded name, with legitimate issue unknown. He did however leave an illegitimate son:

- John Wensley, who having studied canon law at Oxford University obtained a papal dispensation to hold benefices despite his illegitimacy. He became a canon of Lichfield Cathedral, vicar-general to the Bishop of Coventry and Lichfield and Archdeacon of Stafford 1442–59.

== Death and burial ==
He was killed on 21 July 1403, fighting at the Battle of Shrewsbury for the Lancastrian cause and was buried in Bakewell Church, Derbyshire (where he may have been a member of a guild within the church), 5 miles north-west of Wensley, where survives his effigy, dressed in full armour and wearing around his neck the Collar of Esses of the Lancastrian livery. His helmet is inscribed IHC Nazaren ("Jesus of Nazareth").
