= Peter Fretchville =

English politician

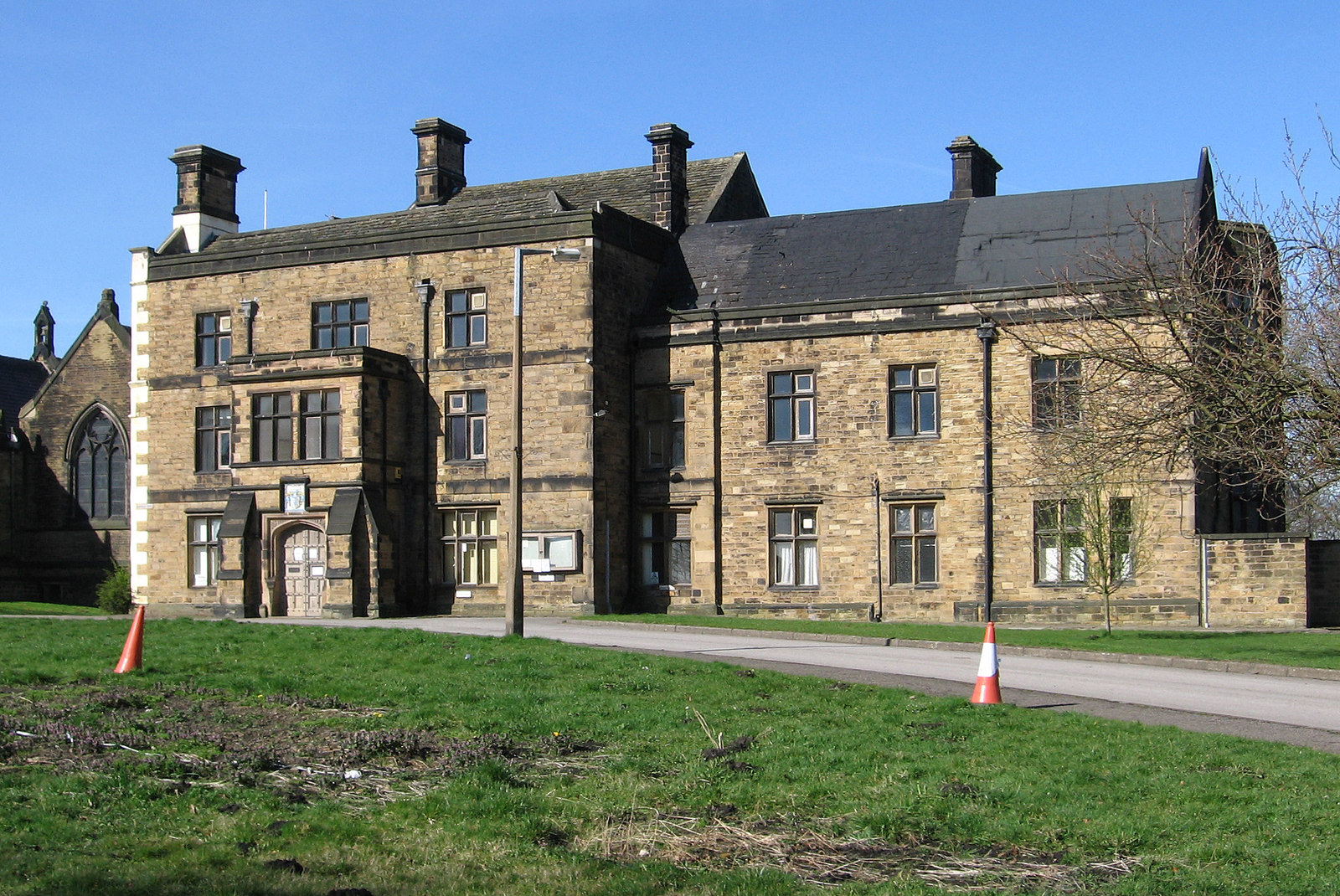
Staveley Hall, built by Sir Peter Fretchville in 1604

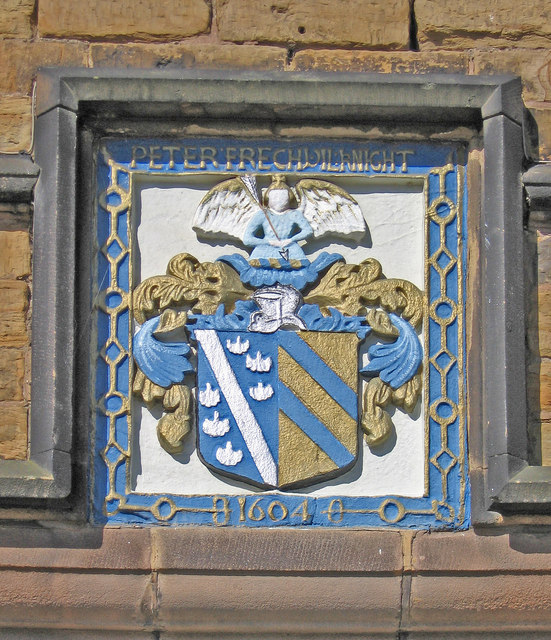
1604 heraldic shield above the front door of Staveley Hall, showing the arms of the father of Sir Peter Fretchville (d.1634) ( Azure, a bend between six escallops argent), impaling Kay (for his second wife Margaret Kaye, daughter of Arthur Kaye of Woodsome, Yorkshire) Argent, two bendlets sable (painted incorrectly here as Or, two bendlets azure)

Sir Peter Fretchville (c. 1571 – 9 April 1634) (Frescheville/Frechvile/Fretchvile, etc) of Staveley, Derbyshire, was an English politician who sat in the House of Commons in 1601 and from 1621 to 1622. In 1604 he built Staveley Hall, which survives today.

== Origins ==
He was the son of Peter Fretchvile of Staveley by his second wife Margaret Kaye, daughter of Arthur Kaye of Woodsome Hall, Almondbury, Yorkshire. His grandfather, also Peter Fretchville of Staveley, who fought at the battle of Pinkie, died in November 1559. His father died in 1582, and an inventory was made of the household goods at Staveley.

== Career ==
He matriculated at St John's College, Cambridge in 1587. He entered the Middle Temple in 1591 but in 1596 petitioned his Inn to be allowed to keep his chamber since the business of managing his several estates in Derbyshire prevented him from occupying it for the statutory eight weeks. In 1601 Fretchville was elected a Member of Parliament for Derbyshire. Whilst serving he was appointed Sheriff of Derbyshire for 1601-2. Although it was illegal to stand for Parliament while serving as Sheriff, it was legal to become Sheriff while serving as an MP, as the discussions of the time concluded. He was knighted at Sir Edward Stanhope’s house at Grimston on 19 April 1603 while King James I was on his journey from Scotland. He was a Justice of the Peace by 1604. In 1604 he was a collector of the loan. He was awarded MA at Cambridge University in 1613, probably on the visit of Prince Charles. He was Commissioner for Musters by 1618. In 1621 he was elected an MP for Derbyshire again. He was Deputy Lieutenant by 1624 and was collector of the loan in 1625.

== Marriages and children ==
He married twice:

- Firstly in 1604 to Joyce Fleetwood (d.1619), a daughter of Thomas Fleetwood (1518–70) of The Vache, Chalfont St. Giles, Buckinghamshire and of Rossall, Lancashire, MP for Preston (1553) and Buckinghamshire (1563) and widow of Sir Hewett Osborne (d. c.1600) of Parsloes, Essex. By Joyce he had one son and two daughters, including:
  - John Frescheville, 1st Baron Frescheville (1607-1682), raised to the peerage in 1665 but died without male children when the title became extinct.
- Secondly in 1620 to Isabel Neville, daughter of Henry (or Percy) Neville of Grove, Nottinghamshire, and widow of Sir Richard Harpur (or Hastner) (d.1619) of Hemington, Leicestershire, without children.

== Death and burial ==
Fretchville died at the age of about 62 and asked in his will to be buried in the church at Staveley.

== Sources ==
- "G.M.C." / P. W. Hasler, biography of FRETCHVILE, Peter (c.1571-1634), of Staveley, Derbys., published in History of Parliament: the House of Commons 1558-1603, ed. P.W. Hasler, 1981
- Moseley, Virginia C.D., biography of FRESCHEVILLE (FRECHVILE, FRETCHVILE), Sir Peter (1575-1634), of Staveley, Derbys., published in History of Parliament: the House of Commons 1604-1629, ed. Andrew Thrush and John P. Ferris, 2010

Parliament of England
Preceded by Thomas Gresley; John Harpur	Member of Parliament for Derbyshire; 1601; With: Francis Leeke	Succeeded by Sir John Harpur; William Kniveton
Preceded by Sir William Cavendish; Henry Howard	Member of Parliament for Derbyshire; 1621–1622; With: Sir William Cavendish	Succeeded by Sir William Cavendish; John Stanhope
