= Thomas Okeover =

English politician (died 1460)

Thomas Okeover (died 4 January 1460) was an English politician who sat as MP for Derbyshire in 1407 and December 1421. He also served as constable of the Tower of London by October 1413.

He was the son and heir of Sir Philip Okeover. He married Margaret and had two sons (one predeceased him), he married his second wife Thomasina, the widow of George Sallowe by 1432. In 1420, he was gifted a piece of land by Sir John Cokayne.

He attended the county elections in May 1413, March 1416, 1420, May 1421, 1422 and 1423.
