= Henry Gilbert (politician) =

Henry Gilbert (before 1636 – 1716) was an English politician who served as the member of parliament (MP) for Derbyshire from 1690 to 1695.

== Early life and family ==
Henry Gilbert was born before 1636 into the Gilbert family of Locko, Derbyshire. The family had acquired the Locko estate during the reign of Elizabeth I, having been settled at Lullington in Derbyshire since the reign of Henry III. Three successive generations in a row in the 17th century had been named Henry, complicating precise identification of individuals. The MP's father was likely a Royalist during the English Civil War; in 1643, his rents were collected by the county treasurer, and in 1646, he compounded for £800, a sum later reduced due to his association with a Parliamentarian garrison.

== Political career ==
In the 1670s and early 1680s, Gilbert was active as a justice of the peace and commissioner for recusants. At a 1685 meeting of gentry to select county candidates, he was reported to have supported Sir Robert Coke and Sir Gilbert Clarke, though he had interests for Mr. Anchitell Grey, indicating a split interest between party lines. His stance during the Glorious Revolution is unknown, but by July 1690, either he or his son (born 1659) was captain of a company of foot in the Derbyshire militia.

In 1690, Gilbert was elected MP for Derbyshire, a position he held until 1695, serving alongside Sir Gilbert Clarke. He was identified as a Tory, though his allegiance to the court was somewhat uncertain. In October 1690, he was appointed to draft two bills, and by December, he was seen as likely to support the Marquess of Carmarthen's ministerial role in the event of a Commons attack. In April 1691, Robert Harley classified him as a Country supporter. On January 6, 1692, Gilbert introduced a bill to prohibit the buying and selling of offices. His final mention in the Journals came on February 12, 1695, when he lodged a complaint about a breach of parliamentary privilege after being subpoenaed to appear before the Court of Chancery.

== Later life and correspondence ==
After choosing not to stand for re-election, Gilbert continued to express his views on parliamentary matters in letters to Thomas Coke between 1699 and 1703. These letters covered topics such as the Derwent navigation, changes in land tax assessment, a bill facilitating the return of tithes to the church, and qualifications for justices of the peace, particularly a clause exempting those over 60 from serving if they wished. Coke's electoral agents regarded Gilbert as a supporter before both county elections in 1701.

== Death ==
Henry Gilbert died in 1716 at the age of 97. As per his request, a post-mortem examination was conducted, revealing multiple stones in his bladder, one of which measured over eight inches and weighed approximately seven ounces. Additionally, a major artery was found to be "ossified and perfect bone, but hollow." He was laid to rest at St. Werburgh's Church in Spondon, Derbyshire. His will, originally dated July 29, 1714, with a codicil added on April 17, 1716, was proved on April 26, 1717.
