= John Milward =

English parliamentary diarist (1599–1670)

John Milward (1599 – 14 September 1670) was an English politician and landowner who served as one of the members of parliament for Derbyshire from 1665 until his death in 1670. He is also known for the diary he kept during his parliamentary service, which provides valuable insights into the workings of Restoration-era politics and administration.

== Early life ==
John Milward was born in 1599 in Thorpe, Derbyshire, England, and was baptized on 20 October 1599. He was the son of John Milward and Mary (nee Blount) Milward, members of a local gentry family with deep roots in Derbyshire. His background as part of the rural landed gentry positioned him well for a role in both local governance and national politics.

== Political career ==
In 1665, John Milward entered the House of Commons as one of the two members of parliament for Derbyshire, replacing John Frescheville. His election came during the early years of the Restoration, a period marked by political stabilization following the English Civil War and Commonwealth. During his tenure, Milward was involved in debates and decisions regarding fiscal and administrative reforms, including issues such as the levying of taxes like ship-money, which were critical to financing the navy and defense. His parliamentary service continued until his death in 1670, after which he was succeeded by William Sacheverell John Milward died on 14 September 1670 and was buried on 21 September 1670 in Darley, Derbyshire.

== His diary ==
John Milward is perhaps best remembered for the diary he maintained during his parliamentary service, covering the period from September 1666 to May 1668. First published in 1938 and subsequently reissued, this diary is a detailed firsthand account of parliamentary debates, administrative challenges, and the intricacies of financial management in post-Civil War England. The diary not only records the proceedings of the House of Commons but also provides personal insights into the challenges faced by Restoration politicians, including issues such as the irregularities in the payment of naval wages by tickets.
