= Thomas Marchington =

Member of the Parliament of England

Sir Thomas Marchington (died c.1397) was an English MP for Derbyshire.

== Early history ==
Thomas was a descendant of the Norman Montgomery family who were sub-lieutenants of Earl Ferrer, Earl of Derby, whose chief domain was Tutbury Castle, on the county border of Derbyshire and Staffordshire from 1080 and 1263. This junior Montgomery branch originates from the Welsh borders branch of Montgomery, who arrived with Duke William in 1066. The Derbyshire Montgomerys held manors around the Tutbury area being; Rolleston, Marston, Cubley, and Marchington and were charged with Forest administration services for the vast Needwood Forest which was overseen by the Ferrers Earls of Derby as a royal forest. They also provided Knight services. Thomas Marchington's family line seems to have died out as no direct trace can be found. Cubley church tower displays armorial arms of the Montgomery family along with one Marchington display; facing the church is the remains of the Montgomery old house.

He sat as the MP for Derbyshire in 1380, 1382 and 1383.

He died c.1397 and was interred in Ashbourne, Derbyshire, however there is no physical grave or memorial for him that exist to this day.

== Armorial arms ==
Marchington of Asbourne; Cubley; Rodsley.

Argent a fret sable and a canton gules (as quartered by Curzon, Kedleston church, noted c.1611, local MS 6341). Borne by Sir Thomas de Marchington of Marchington, Staffs., also of Rodsley, Wyaston and Snelston c. 1397 (Willement Roll). An ancestor, Sir Roger son of Ralph de Marchington, was knighted 1281: his father was a Montgomery of Cubley.
