= Henry Vernon (died 1569) =

English politician

Henry Vernon (by 1523 – 29 September 1569), of Sudbury, Derbyshire, was an English politician.

He was a member (MP) of the parliament of England for Lichfield in April 1554 and for Derbyshire in November 1554.
