= Henry Booth (MP for Derbyshire) =

English politician

Henry Booth (died 1446), of Arleston and Sinfin, Derbyshire, was an English politician.

He was a member (MP) of the parliament of England for Derbyshire in 1420, 1423, 1425 and 1427.
