= Richard Blackwell (MP) =

16th-century English politician

Richard Blackwell (by 1517–1568) was an English politician.

He was a member (MP) of the parliament of England for Derbyshire in 1545 and October 1553.
