= Roger Leche =

English official and politician

Sir Roger Leche (1361–1416) was a medieval English courtier, Member of Parliament, and Lord High Treasurer.

== Biography ==
=== Early ===
Leche was born into a well-to-do Derbyshire family and benefitted from being a Lancastrian supporter. He was a son of Dawkins Leech.

=== Offices ===
After Henry Bolinbroke's return from exile in 1399, and subsequent coronation as King Henry IV, Leche started to acquire property and income from public offices such as Royal commissioner, justice of the peace, and High Sheriff of Nottinghamshire and Derbyshire for 1400–01. He became a member of the King's household, spending time in 1403 securing Carmarthen Castle against the Welsh. He was knighted by 1404.

In 1402 he represented Derbyshire in Parliament for the first time. He would represent the county again in 1406, 1413, and 1414.

He was made Controller of the Household of Henry IV in 1404 and Steward of the household of Henry, Prince of Wales from 1407 to 1413. Over the next decade he acquired a large number of positions in the royal household administration. He was Keeper of the city of York for the Crown (1405–1406), Steward of the Duchy of Lancaster, Lordship of the High Peak, Derbyshire (1405-death), Steward of the duchy lordship of Tutbury, Staffordshire (by 1407-death), Bailiff of the High Peak (by 1413-death), Chief Steward of the Duchy of Lancaster north parts (1413-death) and Chamberlain of the Duchy of Lancaster (1416-death).

=== Lord High Treasurer ===
He was also Constable of Flint Castle from 1407 to his death. After the accession to the throne of Henry V he was appointed Keeper of the household wardrobe in 1413 and promoted to Lord High Treasurer on 17 April 1416. Ill health forced his retirement on 23 September of the same year and he died two months later.

=== Family ===
He had married twice. From his first marriage he had a son and heir, Sir Philip Leche (died 1420), and four daughters. He secondly married Katherine, the widow of Sir John Bromwich and Sir Hugh Waterton.
