= Samuel Sleigh =

Sir Samuel Sleigh (c. 1605 – 1679) was an English landowner, politician, and sheriff who played a notable role in Derbyshire during the 17th century.

== Early life and family ==
Born around 1605, Samuel Sleigh was the son of Gervaise Sleigh of Ashe, Derbyshire, and Elizabeth Cholmondeley. The Sleigh family had established roots in Derbyshire, with Gervaise being a prominent figure in the region.

In 1646, Sleigh purchased Etwall Hall, a significant estate in Derbyshire. Following his acquisition, he initiated major reconstruction efforts.

== Political and public service ==
Sir Samuel Sleigh served as the high Sheriff of Derbyshire in 1648 and again in 1666, a role that involved overseeing law and order in the county. He was also a member of parliament, representing Derbyshire during the Second Parliament of the Protectorate.

In 1654, Sleigh contested the election of Nathaniel Barton to the First Protectorate Parliament, challenging Barton's eligibility based on his prior clerical status. Sleigh argued that Barton's holy orders disqualified him from serving as a Member of Parliament. In response, Barton published "The Representation or Defence of Collonel Nathaniell Barton," addressing the allegations made by Sleigh and defending his position.

Sir Samuel Sleigh died in 1679.
