= Henry Vernon (cricketer) =

English cricketer (1828–1855)

Personal information
- Full name: Henry Vernon
- Born: 16 December 1828; England
- Died: 9 February 1855 (aged 26); Tixover, Rutland, England
- Batting: Unknown
- Bowling: Unknown

Domestic team information
- Years: Team
- 1850–1852: Cambridge University
- 1852–1854: Marylebone Cricket Club

Career statistics
Competition	First-class
Matches	34
Runs scored	763
Batting average	13.62
100s/50s	–/1
Top score	59
Balls bowled	20
Wickets	4
Bowling average	?
5 wickets in innings	–
10 wickets in match	–
Best bowling	3/?
Catches/stumpings	22/–
- Source: Cricinfo, 25 January 2023

Henry Vernon (16 December 1828 – 19 February 1855) was an English cricketer who played first-class cricket for Cambridge University, the Marylebone Cricket Club (MCC) and other amateur teams between 1850 and 1854. His birthplace is not known, but he died at Tixover, Rutland.

He was the eldest son of Henry Charles Vernon and grandson of Lt Gen Henry Charles Edward Vernon. Vernon's family owned Hilton Hall in Staffordshire. He was educated at Harrow School and at Trinity College, Cambridge.

He was in the Harrow cricket eleven for five years from 1845 to 1849 as a middle-order batsman (sometimes an opener) and a bowler – he was 20 at the time of his fifth Eton v Harrow match. Neither his batting nor his bowling style is known. He made his first-class cricket debut while still at school by appearing in a match for the Gentlemen of England against a Gentlemen of Kent team in August 1848. He played regularly for Cambridge University from 1850 to 1852, appearing three times in the University Match against Oxford University and captaining the side in his final year. That 1852 University Match provided him with his best first-class bowling figures: he took three wickets, though the full bowling analysis has not survived, and his personal success was insufficient to prevent a crushing innings defeat for his Cambridge side. His best batting had come earlier in a match for Cambridge University against the MCC, when he made 59, his only half-century. From the end of the university term in 1850, he played for several other amateur teams, rarely making much impact, and continued to do so after he left university: he played in the North v South annual match twice, and four times in Gentlemen v Players fixtures. He also appeared four times for teams calling themselves "England" which, though of no recognised international status, often contained the best cricketers of the day.

Vernon graduated from Cambridge University with a Bachelor of Arts degree in 1853. He does not appear to have followed any profession, and he died barely two years later at Tixover Hall in Rutland, the home of a Harrow contemporary (and very occasional cricketer), Charles Ormston Eaton, from what was termed "congestion of the brain". In some newspapers, the notice of Vernon's death at Eaton's house ran adjacent to a different notice about the marriage of Eaton's sister in Rome, two weeks earlier, both notices contriving to mention both Eaton and Tixover Hall.
