= John Ferrers (died 1680) =

Member of the Parliament of England

John Ferrers (26 July 1629 – 14 August 1680) was an English politician who sat in the House of Commons in 1660.

Ferrers was the son of Sir Humphrey Ferrers of Tamworth Castle. In 1660, Ferrers was elected Member of Parliament for Derbyshire in the Convention Parliament.

Ferrers died at the age of 51 and was buried in Tamworth Church, where he was given a rich baroque monument.

Ferrers married Anne Carleton, daughter of Sir Dudley Carleton of Imber Court. His son Humphrey predeceased him and Tamworth Castle and its titles passed to his granddaughter Anne, who married Robert Shirley.
