= Francis Curzon (died 1592) =

English politician

Francis Curzon (by 1523 – 1591/1592) was an English politician.

He was a member (MP) of the parliament of England for Derbyshire in April 1554 and 1571.
