= William Cavendish, 2nd Earl of Devonshire =

Earl of Devonshire

The Right Honourable The Earl of Devonshire
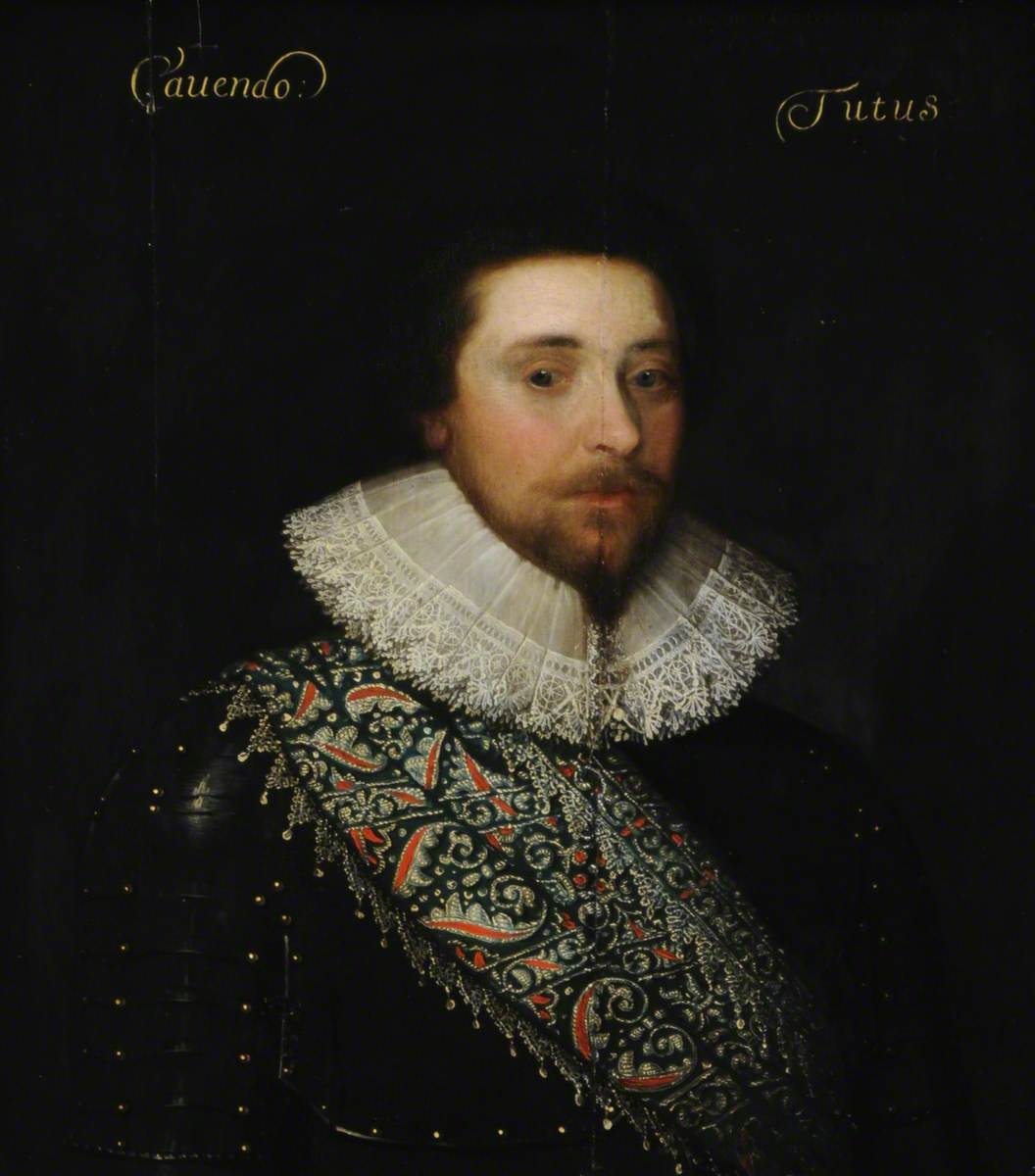
- Born: circa 1590
- Died: 20 June 1628
- Spouse: Christian Bruce (m. 1608)
- Children: Anne Rich, Countess of Warwick; William Cavendish, 3rd Earl of Devonshire; Charles Cavendish; Henry Cavendish
- Parent(s): William Cavendish, 1st Earl of Devonshire; Anne Keighley

William Cavendish, 2nd Earl of Devonshire (c. 1590 – 20 June 1628) was an English nobleman, courtier, and politician who sat in the House of Commons from 1614 until 1626 when he succeeded to the peerage and sat in the House of Lords.

== Life ==
Cavendish was the second son of William Cavendish, 1st Earl of Devonshire, by his first wife Anne Keighley. He was educated by Thomas Hobbes, the philosopher, who lived at Chatsworth as his private tutor for many years. In 1608, he went up to St John's College, Cambridge accompanied by Hobbes. He was knighted at Whitehall in 1609. He then went with Hobbes on a Grand Tour from 1614, where he visited France and Italy. He was a leader of court society, and an intimate friend of James I, and Hobbes praised his learning in the dedication of his translation of Thucydides.

In 1614, Cavendish was elected member of parliament for Derbyshire. He became Lord Lieutenant of Derbyshire in 1619. In 1621 he was re-elected MP for Derbyshire. In April 1622 he introduced to audiences with the king Schwarzenburg, ambassador from the Emperor Ferdinand, Valerssio from Venice, and d'Arsennes and Joachimi from the United Provinces. He was re-elected MP for Derbyshire in 1624 and 1625. In 1625 he was present at Charles I's marriage with Henrietta Maria. He was high bailiff of Tutbury in 1626 and was re-elected MP for Derbyshire in 1626, until the death of his father early in 1626 gave him a seat in the House of Lords. In the Lords, he resisted George Villiers, 1st Duke of Buckingham's attempt to find a treasonable meaning on a speech of Sir Dudley Digges (13 May 1626).

Earl of Devon's Estate Act 1627
- Act of Parliament
- Parliament of England
- Long title: An Act concerning the Inheritance, Freehold and Possessions of William Earl of Devon.
- Citation: 3 Cha. 1. c. 3 Pr.
- Territorial extent: England and Wales

Dates
- Royal assent: 10 March 1629
- Commencement: 17 March 1628 (Note: Start of session.)

Status: Current legislation

Cavendish's spending strained his resources, and he procured a private act of Parliament, the Earl of Devon's Estate Act 1627 (3 Cha. 1. c. 3 Pr.) to enable him to sell some of the entailed estates in discharge of his debts in 1629. His London house was in Bishopsgate, on the site afterwards occupied by Devonshire Square.

Cavendish died at his London house, from over-indulgence it was said, at the age of about 35 and was buried in All Hallows Church (All Saints Church), Derby. The monument was sculpted by Edward Marshall.

== Family ==
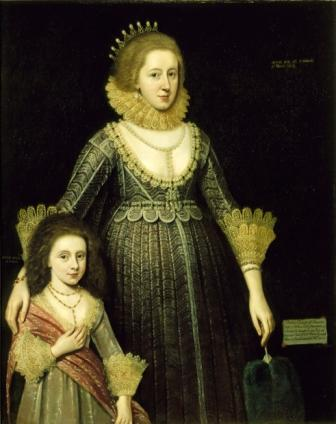
Christian, Lady Cavendish, with her daughter

Cavendish married Christian(a) Bruce, daughter of Edward Bruce, 1st Lord Kinloss, on 10 April 1608. They had four children:

- Anne Cavendish (c. 1611–1638), married Robert Rich, 3rd Earl of Warwick and had issue.
- William Cavendish, 3rd Earl of Devonshire (1617–1684)
- Charles Cavendish (1620–1643)
- Henry Cavendish (died April 1620)

== Bibliography ==
- Pearson, John, The Serpent and the Stag, Holt, Rinehart and Winston, 1983.

Attribution:

- This article incorporates text from a publication now in the public domain: "Cavendish, William (1591?–1628)". Dictionary of National Biography. London: Smith, Elder & Co. 1885–1900.

Parliament of England
Preceded by Sir John Harpur; William Kniveton	Member of Parliament for Derbyshire; 1614–1626; With: Henry Howard 1614; Sir Peter Fretchville 1621–1622; John Stanhope 1624–1625; John Manners 1626	Succeeded by Sir Edward Leeke; John Frescheville
Honorary titles
Vacant Title last held by The Earl of Shrewsbury	Lord Lieutenant of Derbyshire jointly with The Earl of Devonshire 1619–1626; 1619–1628	Succeeded by The Earl of Newcastle
Peerage of England
Preceded by William Cavendish	Earl of Devonshire; 1626–1628	Succeeded by William Cavendish
