= Nathaniel Barton =

17th-century English military officer and politician

Nathaniel Barton (1615/16–1672/73) was an English clergyman, military officer and politician who played a notable role during the mid-17th century, particularly during the English Civil Wars and the subsequent Protectorate period.

== Early life ==
The son of Edmund Barton, rector of Broseley, Shropshire, Nathaniel Barton was born in 1615/16, matriculated at New Inn Hall, Oxford, in 1634 and graduated with a BA in 1638, advancing to MA in 1641 (he later took a BD in 1649). He became chaplain to Sir Thomas Burdett, 1st Baronet, of Bramcote in Derbyshire.

== Military career ==
After the outbreak of the First English Civil War in 1642 Barton joined the Parliamentarian army. By late spring 1643 he was major of Sir Richard Houghton's Derbyshire and Staffordshire regiment of foot, of which Thomas Sanders was lieutenant-colonel. The regiment was captured at Burton upon Trent when the town fell to the Royalists on 2 July. After their release, Sanders and Barton joined a new regiment of horse commanded by Sir John Gell, as major and captain respectively. Gell placed Barton in command of the garrison of Barton Blount from where he could harass the Royalist garrison at Tutbury. Barton's Troop was engaged at the storming of Oswestry in June 1644, a skirmish there the following month, and a skirmish at Burton in July 1645. At Barton Blount Barton reported to the Parliamentarian regional commander, Sir William Brereton, and later sided with Brereton in a dispute with Gell.

In 1645 Barton transferred to Colonel Richard Graves's Regiment of Horse of the New Model Army (possibly after both regiments were engaged at the Battle of Rowton Heath). The regiment served in the Siege of Oxford in 1646. At the outbreak of the Second English Civil War Graves sided with Parliament against the Army and was replaced in June 1647 as colonel by Maj Adrian Scrope, with Barton promoted to major. During the subsequent campaign Barton was detached with three Troops serving under Col Thomas Horton in South Wales, at the seizure of Brecon in April 1648, the Battle of St Fagans on 8 May, and the subsequent sieges of Tenby and Pembroke Castle. Barton's detachment was then sent north to oppose the Scottish invasion and took part in the Battles of Preston (17 August) and Winwick Pass (19 August). Barton attended the Army Council meetings in November and December 1648. Most of Scrope's Regiment joined the Leveller Mutiny and was disbanded after Cromwell had the ringleaders shot at Burford in May 1649.

On 2 March 1650 Barton was appointed Colonel of the Derbyshire Militia horse and foot. When King Charles II and the Scots invaded the following year during the Third English Civil War the Derbyshire Militia was not involved, but Barton served as major in Sanders' Horse.

== Political career ==
Barton was a Justice of the peace in Derbyshire, and was one of the magistrates who examined the Quaker leader George Fox after his arrest. In 1653, Barton was nominated to represent Derbyshire in Barebone's Parliament, an assembly convened by Oliver Cromwell and the Army Council. Following this, he was elected as one of the four members for Derbyshire in the First Pvrotectorate Parliament of 1654.

However, his election faced challenges due to his prior clerical status. A defeated rival contested his eligibility, arguing that his holy orders disqualified him from serving as a member of parliament. Barton countered by asserting that the abolition of episcopal ordination rendered this objection moot. The dispute remained unresolved at the time of the Parliament's dissolution.

Records indicate that Barton did not serve as a member for Derbyshire in the Second and Third Protectorate Parliaments. In the Second Protectorate Parliament of 1656, the members for Derbyshire were Sir Samuel Sleigh and German Pole. In the Third Protectorate Parliament of January 1659, the representatives were John Gell and Thomas Sanders.

In 1654, Barton published a "Representation and Defence" in response to allegations made against him by Sir Samuel Sleigh, addressing claims related to his conduct and qualifications.

Following the fall of Richard Cromwell, Sanders was reinstated in command of his old regiment and Barton served as his major once more. They were replaced with other officers by General Monck and were arrested in late 1659, apparently for armed resistance. On 27 December they were ordered to be released by the restored Rump Parliament, and Barton was authorised to disarm Parliament's enemies in Staffordshire. Sanders was given command of Col Robert Swallow's regiment with Barton as his major.

After the Restoration of the Monarchy Barton became curate of Caldwell Chapel in Stapenhill parish, Derbyshire, but was ejected from it in 1662. He lost the royal lands he had purchased during the interregnum, and in 1669 was accused of being privy to a conspiracy. Barton died between March 1672 and November 1673, leaving a wife, Sarah, two sons and four daughters.
