= Thomas Sanders (MP) =

Thomas Sanders ( 1610–1695) was an English politician and military officer during the English Civil War who served as a Member of Parliament (MP) for Derbyshire in the Third Protectorate Parliament of January 1659, during the later years of the Interregnum under the rule of Richard Cromwell.

Thomas Sanders was born in Little Ireton ( now part of Kirk Ireton), Derbyshire, in 1610. Not much is known about his early life, but he came from a family that was active in the affairs of Derbyshire, a county that was central to the military campaigns of the English Civil War.

Sanders played a significant role in the English Civil War as a Parliamentarian. He commanded a troop of horse in Derbyshire, a county that saw key military activity throughout the conflict. His superior officer was Sir John Gell, the commander in chief of Parliamentary forces in Derbyshire, Staffordshire, and Warwickshire from 1643. Sanders's relationship with Gell was fraught with tension and acrimony, with letters from the period documenting mutual accusations, particularly involving Gell's brother, Thomas Gell. After 1646 he became a Colonel of the Nottingham Regiment and served with distinction on the side of Parliament until 1654 when his commission was removed by Cromwell. In 1659 he was restored to his commission by king Charles II as he now supported the restoration of the monarchy.

Sanders was elected to represent Derbyshire in the Third Protectorate Parliament, which convened in January 1659 following the resignation of Oliver Cromwell's successor, Richard Cromwell. The parliament was called to address the growing instability of the Protectorate, as political factions vied for control over England's governance. Sanders' role in parliament coincided with a period of significant political tension, with increasing calls for the restoration of the monarchy and the decline of the republican government established after the English Civil War.

Little is known about Sanders' personal life. In common with many contemporary MPs, most of his political contributions were most likely concerned with local matters, in his case Derbyshire affairs, although more than many he also addressed broader national issues of governance and religious settlement. Henry Reece's The Fall (Y.U.P. 1994) contains an account of Sanders's experience at the end of the Republic in 1659-'60; and in late 1654 he, the Regicide John Okey (executed 1662) and Matthew Alured had produced the petition of the three colonels against the Protectorate. Sanders died in 1695.
