= Gilbert Clarke =

Sir Gilbert Clarke (c. 1645 – 1701) was an English politician who served as the Member of Parliament (MP) for Derbyshire from 1685 to 1695.

== Early life and education ==
Sir Gilbert Clarke was born around 1645, the eldest surviving son of Godfrey Clarke of Somershall Hall, Brampton, and Chilcote, Derbyshire. His mother, Elizabeth, was the daughter of Sir Thomas Milward of Eaton Dovedale, Derbyshire.

Clarke pursued his education at University College, Oxford, where he matriculated on 12 July 1661 at the age of 16. In 1667, he continued his studies in law by entering the Inner Temple.

== Career ==
Clarke succeeded his father in 1670 and was knighted on 2 March 1671. He held the position of Sheriff of Derbyshire from 1675 to 1676.

In 1685, Clarke was elected as a Member of Parliament for Derbyshire, serving alongside Sir John Gell during the reign of King James II. He continued his parliamentary career through the Glorious Revolution and into the reign of William III and Mary II, securing re-election in 1689, 1690, and 1695.

== Political stance ==
Clarke initially exhibited a mixed political alignment, engaging with both Tory and Whig factions. However, by the mid-1690s, he had aligned himself firmly with the Country Tory faction, opposing many of the government's policies.

He was particularly noted for his opposition to the Court in several key parliamentary votes, including his stance against fixing the price of guineas in 1696.

== Personal life and death ==
Clarke was married three times. His first marriage, in 1661, was to Jane Byerley, who died in 1667; the couple had one daughter who predeceased them. In 1671, he married Barbara Clerke, with whom he had two sons and two daughters. Following Barbara’s death in 1687, Clarke married Frances Legh in 1691; however, they had no children together.

In his later years, Clarke’s health began to decline, affecting his ability to attend parliamentary sessions. He was frequently granted leave from his duties due to illness.

Clarke died in 1701, leaving his estates to his son, Godfrey Clarke, who later served as a Member of Parliament for Derbyshire.
