= Nathaniel Curzon =

Nathaniel Curzon may refer to:

- Sir Nathaniel Curzon, 4th Baronet (1676–1758)
- Nathaniel Curzon, 1st Baron Scarsdale (1726–1804)
- Nathaniel Curzon, 2nd Baron Scarsdale (1752–1837)
- Nathaniel Curzon, 3rd Baron Scarsdale (died 1856)
