= Lord John Cavendish =

British nobleman and politician

The Right Honourable Lord John Cavendish
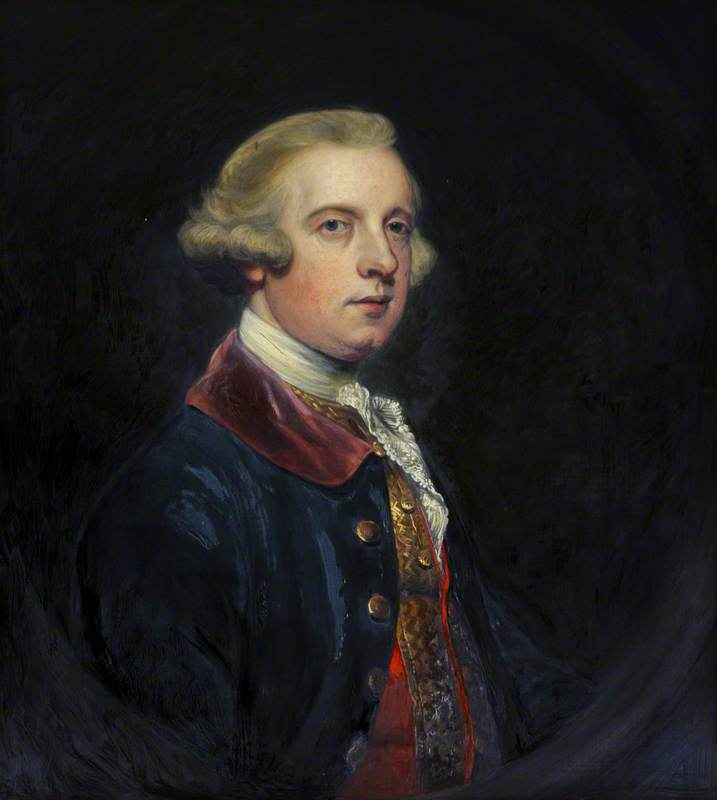

Chancellor of the Exchequer
- In office 2 April 1783 – 19 December 1783
- Monarch: George III
- Prime Minister: The Duke of Portland
- Preceded by: William Pitt the Younger
- Succeeded by: William Pitt the Younger
- In office 27 March 1782 – 10 July 1782
- Monarch: George III
- Prime Minister: The Marquess of Rockingham
- Preceded by: Lord North
- Succeeded by: William Pitt the Younger

Personal details
- Born: 22 October 1732
- Died: 18 December 1796 (aged 64)
- Resting place: Derby Cathedral
- Party: Whig
- Parent(s): William Cavendish, 3rd Duke of Devonshire; Catherine Hoskins

Lord John Cavendish PC (22 October 1732 – 18 December 1796) was a British nobleman and politician.

== Background ==
Cavendish was the youngest son of William Cavendish, 3rd Duke of Devonshire, and his wife Catherine, daughter of John Hoskins. Prime Minister William Cavendish, 4th Duke of Devonshire, Lord George Cavendish and Field Marshal Lord Frederick Cavendish were his elder brothers. He was educated at Newcome's School in Hackney and at Peterhouse, Cambridge.

== Political career ==
He served as Chancellor of the Exchequer in 1782 and 1783, and was sworn of the Privy Council in 1782. He was a supporter of Lord Rockingham, and subsequently of the Fox-North Coalition that brought the Duke of Portland to power. He lost his seat in the election of 1784, when the coalition fell, and did not return to the House of Commons until 1794, in the family seat of Derbyshire.

== Family ==
Cavendish lived at Billing Hall, Northamptonshire which he commissioned John Carr to substantially remodel in the fashionable Palladian style around 1776. The house passed to the Elwes family in 1790.

He died unmarried in December 1796, aged 64.

== Legacy ==
Cavendish's friend Edmund Burke penned several eulogies of him after his death: "The world never produced a more upright and honourable mind; with very considerable talents, and a still more considerable improvement of them".

There is lost to the world, in every thing but the example of his life the fairest mind that perhaps ever infor'd a human body. A mind totally free from every Vice, and fill'd with Virtues of all kinds, and in each kind of no common rank or form; benevolent, friendly, generous, disinterested, unambitious almost to a fault; Tho' cold in his exterior, he was inwardly quick and full of feeling, and tho' reserv'd from modesty, from dignity, from family temperament and not from design, he was an entire stranger to every thing false and counterfeit: so great an Enemy to all dissimulation active or passive, and indeed even to a fair and just ostentation, that some of his Virtues, obscur'd by his other Virtues, wanted something of that burnish and lustre which those who know how to assay the solidity and fineness of the metal wish'd them to have. It were to be wish'd that he had had more of that Vanity of which we who acted on the same stage had enough and to spare. I have known very few men of better natural Parts, and none more perfected by every species of elegant and usefull erudition. He served the publick often out of Office, sometimes in it, with Fidelity, and diligence, and when the occasion call'd for it, with a manly resolution. At length when he was overborne by the Torrent, he retir'd from a world that certainly was not worthy of him. He was of a character that seems as if it were peculiar to this Country. He was exactly what we conceive an English Nobleman of the old Stamp, and one born in better times.

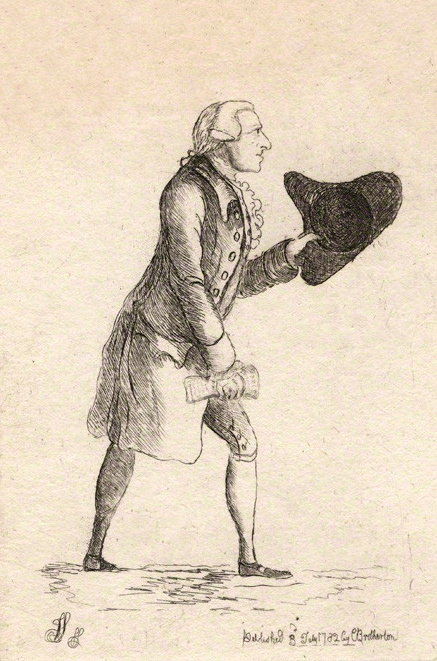
Lord John Cavendish by James Sayers (1782)

Sir Nathaniel Wraxall in his Memoirs sketched Cavendish's character:

Lord John Cavendish was listened to, whenever he rose, with...deference or predilection. His near alliance to the Duke of Devonshire; his very name, connected with the Revolution of 1688, which secured the liberties of Great Britain; his unblemished reputation, and his talents, though very moderate;—all these qualities combined to impress with esteem, even those who differed most from him in political opinion. Nature had in the most legible characters stamped honesty on his countenance.

== Notes ==
Parliament of Great Britain
Preceded by Welbore Ellis; George Dodington; Edward Hungate Beaghan; Lord George Cavendish	Member of Parliament for Weymouth and Melcombe Regis; 1754–1761 with Welbore Ellis; George Dodington; John Tucker	Succeeded by John Tucker; Sir Francis Dashwood, Bt; John Olmius; Richard Glover
Preceded by Sir Henry Slingsby, Bt; Hon. Robert Walsingham	Member of Parliament for Knaresborough; 1761–1768 with Sir Henry Slingsby, Bt 1761–1763; Sir Anthony Abdy, Bt 1763–1768	Succeeded by Sir Anthony Abdy, Bt; Hon. Robert Walsingham
Preceded by Sir George Armytage; Robert Fox-Lane	Member of Parliament for York; 1768–1784 with Charles Turner 1768–1783; The Viscount Galway 1783–1784	Succeeded by Richard Slater Milnes; The Viscount Galway
Preceded by Lord George Cavendish; Edward Miller Mundy	Member of Parliament for Derbyshire; 1794–1796 with Edward Miller Mundy	Succeeded by Edward Miller Mundy; Lord George Cavendish
Political offices
Preceded by Lord North	Chancellor of the Exchequer; 1782	Succeeded by William Pitt
Preceded by William Pitt	Chancellor of the Exchequer; 1783	Succeeded by William Pitt
