= Nathaniel Curzon, 2nd Baron Scarsdale =

English politician and peer

The Right Honourable The Lord Scarsdale
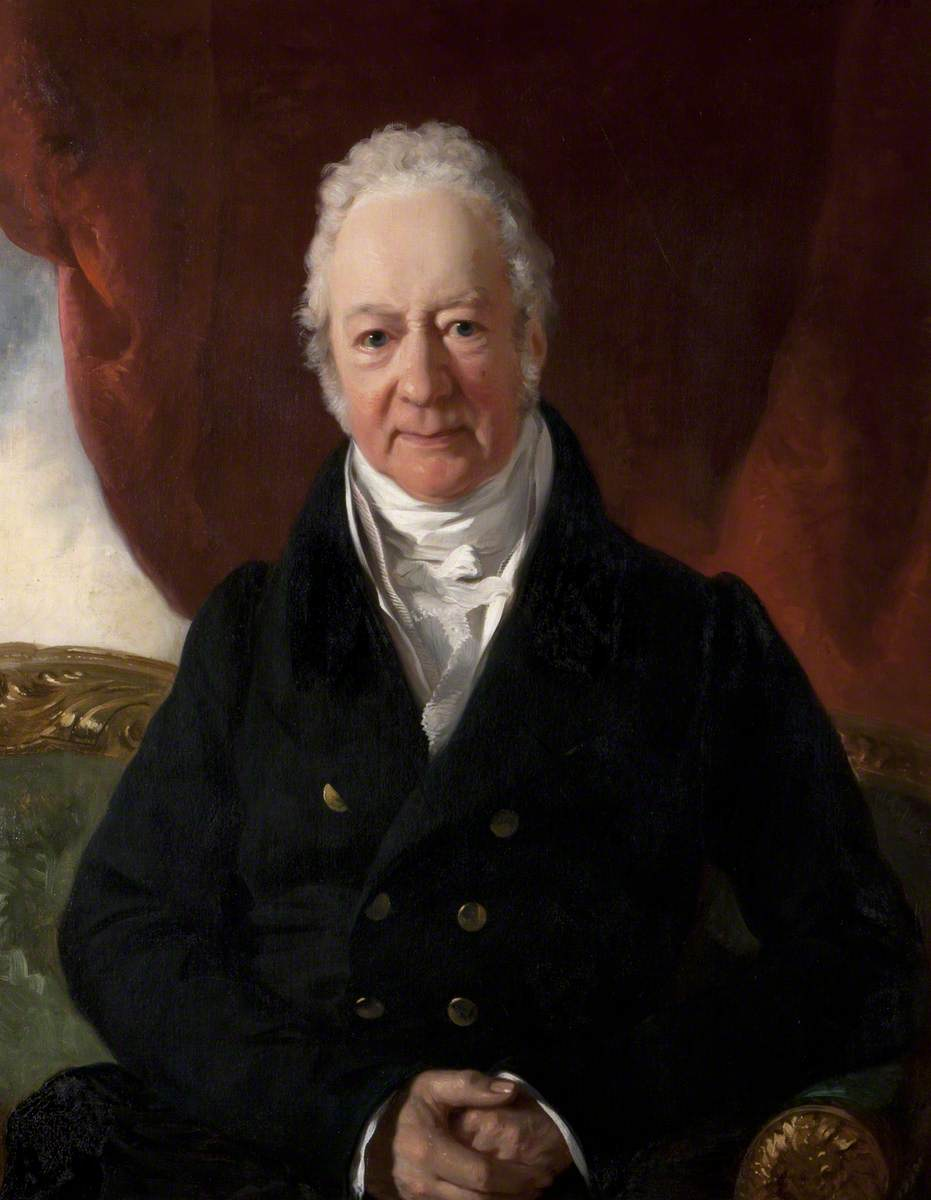
- Portrait of Lord Scarsdale by Ramsay Richard Reinagle, 1828

Member of Parliament for Derbyshire
- In office 1775–1784 Serving with Lord George Cavendish, Lord Richard Cavendish, Lord George Augustus Cavendish
- Preceded by: Lord George Cavendish; Godfrey Bagnall Clarke
- Succeeded by: Lord George Cavendish; Edward Miller Mundy

Personal details
- Born: Nathaniel Curzon; 27 September 1752
- Died: 27 January 1837 (aged 84)
- Party: Tory
- Spouses: Hon. Sophia-Susanna Noel (m. 1777; died 1782) Felicite Anne Josephe de Wattines (m. 1798)
- Children: 14
- Parent(s): Nathaniel Curzon, 1st Baron Scarsdale; Lady Carolina Colyear
- Relatives: Henry Curzon (brother)

Nathaniel Curzon, 2nd Baron Scarsdale (27 September 1752 – 27 January 1837) was an English Tory politician and peer.

== Early life ==
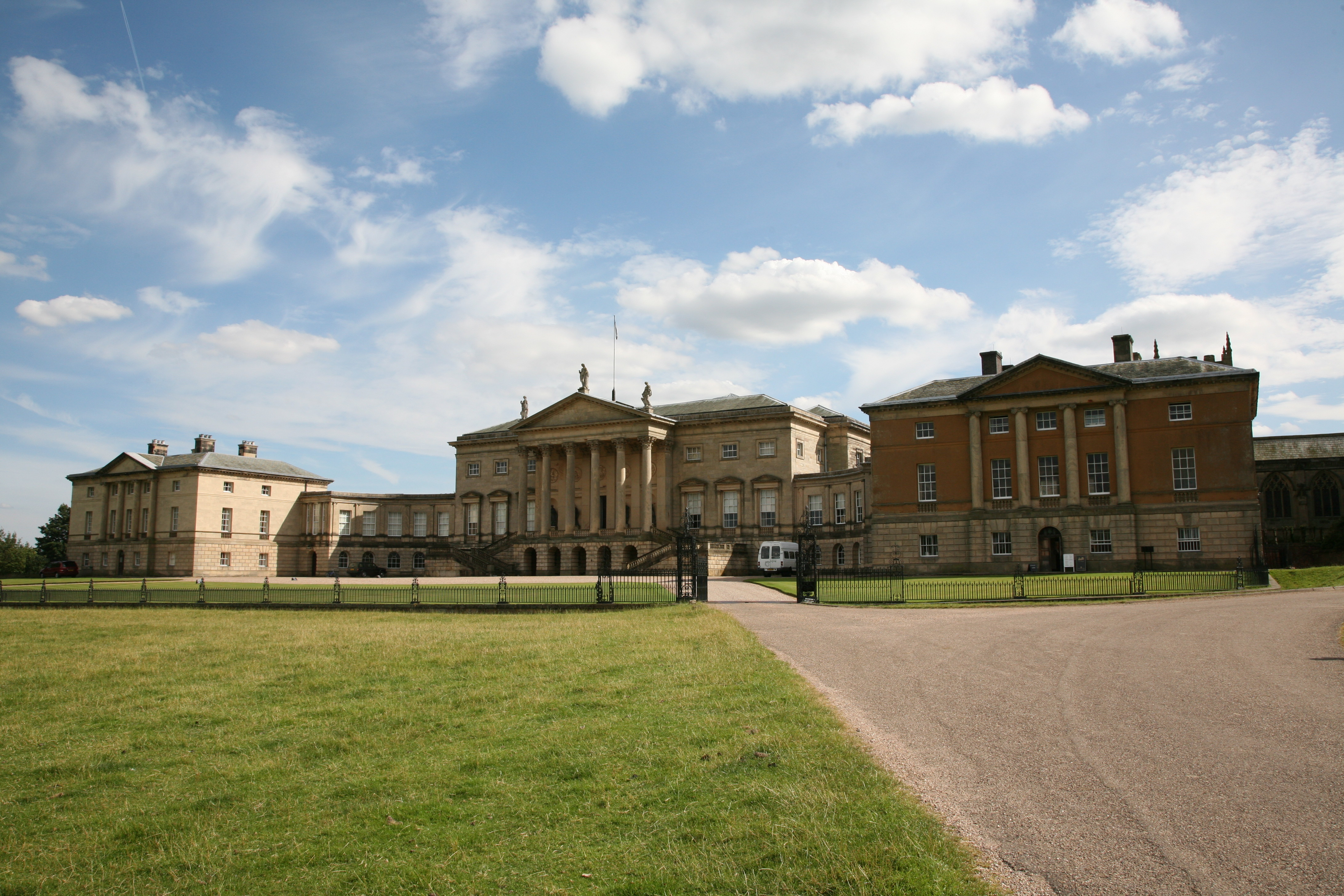
Kedleston Hall, Derbyshire, the Curzon family seat

Curzon was the son of Nathaniel Curzon, 1st Baron Scarsdale of Kedleston Hall, and his wife Lady Caroline Colyear. Among his siblings were Admiral Henry Curzon of the Royal Navy who held commands during the French Revolutionary Wars and the Napoleonic Wars.

His paternal grandparents were Sir Nathaniel Curzon, 4th Baronet (an MP for Derby, Clitheroe, and Derbyshire) and the former Mary Assheton (a daughter of Sir Ralph Assheton, 2nd Baronet, MP for Lancashire and Liverpool). Among his uncles were Assheton Curzon, 1st Viscount Curzon.

His mother was the eldest daughter of Charles, Earl of Portmore and Juliana Osborne, Duchess of Leeds (widow of Peregrine Osborne, 3rd Duke of Leeds).

== Career ==
After contemplating, but not standing at the general election of 1774, Curzon was returned unopposed as Member of Parliament for Derbyshire in February 1775. He is not recorded as having spoken in the House, but the English Chronicle reported in 1780 that "he gives a silent vote always with the ministry." In 1784 Curzon canvassed for re-election, but met with "a serious opposition" in the county, and withdrew before the election.

In 1804 he succeeded his father to the title Lord Scarsdale.

== Personal life ==
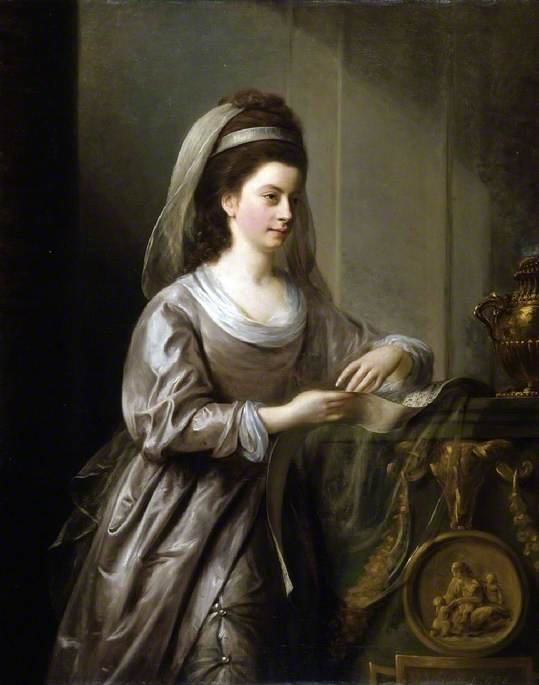
Portrait of his first wife, Hon. Sophia-Susanna Noel, by Nathaniel Hone the Elder, 1778

On 11 August 1777, Curzon married Hon. Sophia-Susanna Noel, daughter of Edward Noel, 1st Viscount Wentworth and the former Judith Lamb (daughter and heiress of William Lamb of Wilby). Her brother was Thomas Noel, 2nd Viscount Wentworth. Before her death in 1782, there were three children of the marriage, including:

- Nathaniel Curzon, 3rd Baron Scarsdale (1781–1856), who died unmarried.
- Hon. Sophia Caroline Curzon (1779–1849), who married Robert Sewallis Shirley, Viscount Tamworth, eldest son and heir apparent of Robert Shirley, 7th Earl Ferrers, in 1800.

On 18 November 1798, he remarried to Felicite Anne Josephe de Wattines (1767–1850) at Hamburg. She was a daughter of Francois Josephe des Wattines, of Heslin, France. Before his death, they were the parents of ten children, including:

- Hon. Alfred Curzon (1801–1850), the Rector of Kedleston 1832 to 1850; he married Sophia Holden, second daughter of Robert Holden, of Nuthall Temple, in 1825.
- Hon. Francis James Curzon (1803–1851), a barrister-at-law.
- Hon. Felicite Anne Josephe Curzon (d. 1844)
- Hon. Mary Elizabeth Curzon (d. 1868), who married John Beaumont, of Barrow, in 1825.
- Hon. Caroline Esther Curzon (d. 1886), who married William Drury-Lowe, of Locko Park, in 1827.

Lord Scarsdale died on 27 January 1837 and was buried at Kedleston. His eldest son Nathaniel succeeded to the title and became Lord Scarsdale.

Parliament of England
Preceded by Lord George Augustus Cavendish; Godfrey Bagnall Clarke	Member of Parliament for Derbyshire; 1775–1784; With: Lord George Augustus Cavendish 1775–1780, Lord Richard Cavendish 1780–1781, Lord George Augustus Cavendish 1781–1784	Succeeded by Lord George Augustus Cavendish; Edward Miller Mundy
Peerage of Great Britain
Preceded by Nathaniel Curzon	Baron Scarsdale; 1804–1837	Succeeded by Nathaniel Curzon
