= Lord George Cavendish (died 1794) =

British nobleman and politician

Lord Cavendish
- Lord George Augustus Cavendish by Mather Brown

Member of Parliament for Member of Parliament for Weymouth and Melcombe Regis
- In office 1751–1754

Member of Parliament for Member of Parliament for Derbyshire
- In office 1754–1780

Personal details
- Born: 1727
- Died: 2 May 1794 (aged 66–67)
- Parents: William Cavendish, 3rd Duke of Devonshire (father); Catherine Cavendish, Duchess of Devonshire (mother)

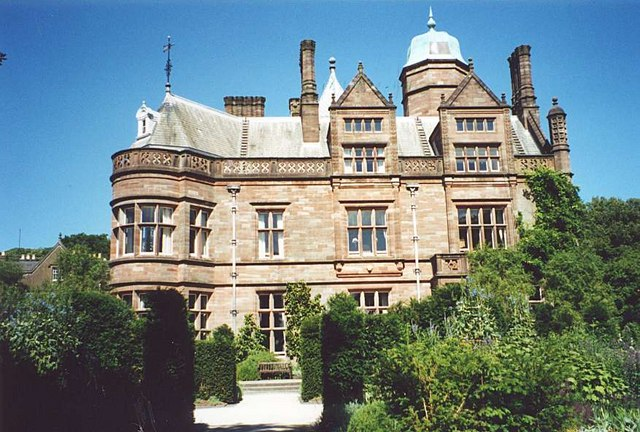
Holker Hall, Cumbria

Lord George Augustus Cavendish MP PC (c. 1727 – 2 May 1794) was a British nobleman, politician, and a member of the House of Cavendish.

== Biography ==
Cavendish was born in London, the second son of William Cavendish, 3rd Duke of Devonshire and his wife, the former Catherine Hoskins. King George II was his godfather. He was educated in Chesterfield and at St John's College, Cambridge.

In 1753, he inherited Holker Hall (then in Lancashire) from his maternal cousin Sir William Lowther, 3rd Baronet. He replanted the park there, and added a number of unusual trees, including Lebanese cedar trees sent to him as seeds from a friend in Lebanon.

He entered Parliament in 1751 for Weymouth and Melcombe Regis, and in 1754, took up the family seat of Derbyshire, which he occupied, with one interruption, until his death forty years later. He served as Comptroller of the Household from 1761 to 1762, and was named to the Privy Council in 1762.

He served as Lord Lieutenant of Derbyshire from 1766 to 1782. Derbyshire had failed to raise its militia regiment during the Seven Years' War, and Cavendish found himself titular colonel of a regiment that did not exist. It was not until 1773 that he found sufficient officers and men, and 1775 before it carried out its first annual training. When the militia was embodied for service during the War of American Independence Cavendish appointed his nephew, the 5th Duke of Devonshire as colonel of the Derbyshire Militia.

Portrait by Mather

Cavendish died suddenly in May 1794 while returning to London from Holker Hall. On his death, Holker passed in turn to his younger brothers.

Parliament of Great Britain
Preceded by Welbore Ellis; Richard Plumer; George Dodington; Edward Hungate Beaghan	Member of Parliament for Weymouth and Melcombe Regis; 1751–1754; With: Welbore Ellis; George Dodington; Edward Hungate Beaghan	Succeeded by Welbore Ellis; Lord John Cavendish; George Bubb Dodington; John Tucker
Preceded by Sir Nathaniel Curzon, Bt; Lord Frederick Cavendish	Member of Parliament for Derbyshire; 1754–1780; With: Sir Nathaniel Curzon 1754–61; Sir Henry Harpur 1761–68; Godfrey Bagnall Clarke 1768–75; Hon. Nathaniel Curzon 1775–80	Succeeded by Hon. Nathaniel Curzon; Lord Richard Cavendish
Preceded by Hon. Nathaniel Curzon; Lord Richard Cavendish	Member of Parliament for Derbyshire; 1781–1794; With: Hon. Nathaniel Curzon 1781–84; Edward Miller Mundy 1784–94	Succeeded by Edward Miller Mundy; Lord John Cavendish
Political offices
Preceded by The Earl of Powis	Comptroller of the Household; 1761–1762	Succeeded by Humphry Morice
Honorary titles
Preceded by Marquess of Granby	Lord Lieutenant of Derbyshire; 1766–1782	Succeeded by The Duke of Devonshire
