= Edward Miller Mundy (1750–1822) =

British politician

Member of Parliament for Derbyshire
- In office 1784–1822 Serving with Lord George Augustus Cavendish, Lord John Cavendish, Lord George Cavendish
- Preceded by: Lord George Augustus Cavendish; Hon. Nathaniel Curzon
- Succeeded by: Francis Mundy; Lord George Cavendish

Sheriff of Derbyshire
- In office 1772–1773
- Preceded by: William Milnes
- Succeeded by: Samuel Rotheram

Personal details
- Born: 18 October 1750 Heanor, Derbyshire, England, GB
- Died: 18 October 1822 (aged 72) Shipley Hall, Shipley, Derbyshire, England, UK
- Party: Tory
- Spouses: Frances Meynell (m. 1772; died 1783) Georgiana, Lady Middleton (m. 1788; died 1789) Catherine Coffin Barwell (m. 1811)
- Parent(s): Edward Mundy; Hester (née Miller)
- Education: Eton College

Edward Miller Mundy (18 October 1750 – 18 October 1822) was an English landowner and Tory politician who was MP for the Derbyshire constituency.

== Early life ==
Edward Miller Mundy was born on 18 October 1750 in Heanor, Derbyshire. He was the son of Edward Mundy and his wife Hester Mundy (née Miller). His father, who was the Sheriff of Derbyshire in 1730, was the son of Lieutenant Colonel Robert Mundy and his wife Ellen (née Slack). Robert was the son of Gilbert Mundy who was the first of the Mundys of Allestree- a cadet branch of the Mundys of Markeaton.

He was a direct male-line descendant of Sir John Mundy, who had purchased the manors of Markeaton (the principal seat of the Mundy family), Allestree and Mackworth from Lord Audley in 1515, he was later appointed Lord Mayor of London in 1522.

He was educated at Eton College.

== Career ==
He was appointed Sheriff of Derbyshire in 1772 and was later elected as the Tory MP for the Derbyshire constituency in 1783, a seat which he held for thirty-nine years.

He was appointed Colonel of the 2nd Derby Regiment of Militia, in July 1803. In 1817 he was a member of the Grand Jury in the trial of the men involved in the Pentrich Rising.

== Personal life ==
Mundy married three times. On 23 December 1772, he married Frances Meynell, the eldest daughter of Godfrey Meynell of Yeldersley. Before her death on 28 October 1783, they were the parents of five sons and one daughter:

- Edward Miller Mundy (d. 1834), who married Nelly Barton in 1802.
- Godfrey Basil Meynell Mundy (d. 1848), who married Hon. Sarah Brydges Rodney, a daughter of Admiral George Rodney, 1st Baron Rodney.
- George Mundy (1777–1861), who was an officer of the British Royal Navy.
- Frederick Mundy
- Henry Mundy
- Frances Mundy (d. 1797), who married Lord Charles Fitzroy, second son of the Augustus FitzRoy, 3rd Duke of Grafton and his first wife, Anne (a daughter of Lord Ravensworth).

On 14 January 1788, he married Georgiana, Lady Middleton as his second wife. The former Georgiana Chadwick, she was the widow of Thomas Willoughby, 4th Baron Middleton and the second daughter of Evelyn Chadwick of West Leake, Nottinghamshire. Before her death on 29 June 1789, they were the parents of one daughter:

- Georgiana Elizabeth Miller Mundy (1789–1822), who married Henry Pelham-Clinton, 4th Duke of Newcastle in 1807.

On 19 October 1811, he married, as his third wife, Catherine (née Coffin) Barwell, the widow of Richard Barwell, MP for Helston and St Ives, and daughter of Nathaniel Coffin of Bristol. Together, they were the parents of one son:

- Robert Miller Mundy (1813–1892), who married Isabella Leyborne-Popham, daughter of General Edward William Leyborne-Popham.

He died at his seat, Shipley Hall, aged 72.

=== Descendants ===
Through his eldest son Edward, he was a grandfather of Edward Miller Mundy, who was Conservative Member for Derbyshire South from 1841 to 1849. He was a grandfather of Godfrey Basil Mundy (1804–1860), the Lt. Gov. of Jersey who married Lady Louisa Catherine Georgina Herbert (a granddaughter of Henry Herbert, 1st Earl of Carnarvon), in 1848.

Through his daughter Frances, he was a grandfather of Sir Charles Augustus FitzRoy, who served as Governor of New South Wales, Prince Edward Island and Antigua; he married Lady Mary Lennox, the eldest child of Charles Lennox, 4th Duke of Richmond.

Through his daughter Georgiana, he was the grandfather of Henry Pelham-Clinton, 5th Duke of Newcastle (who married Lady Susan Hamilton, the only daughter of Alexander Hamilton, 10th Duke of Hamilton); Lord Charles Pelham-Clinton; Lady Caroline Pelham-Clinton (who married Sir Cornwallis Ricketts, 2nd Baronet); Lady Henrietta Pelham-Clinton (who married Admiral Edwin Tennyson-d'Eyncourt of Bayons Manor); and Lord Robert Pelham-Clinton.

Parliament of the United Kingdom
Preceded by Lord George Augustus Cavendish; Hon. Nathaniel Curzon	Member of Parliament for Derbyshire; 1784–1822 with Lord George Augustus Cavendish 1784–1794; Lord John Cavendish 1794–1797; Lord George Cavendish 1797–1822	Succeeded by Francis Mundy; Lord George Cavendish
Honorary titles
Preceded by William Milnes	High Sheriff of Derbyshire; 1772–1773	Succeeded by Samuel Rotheram
