= HMS Elizabeth (1807) =

Ship of the line of the Royal Navy

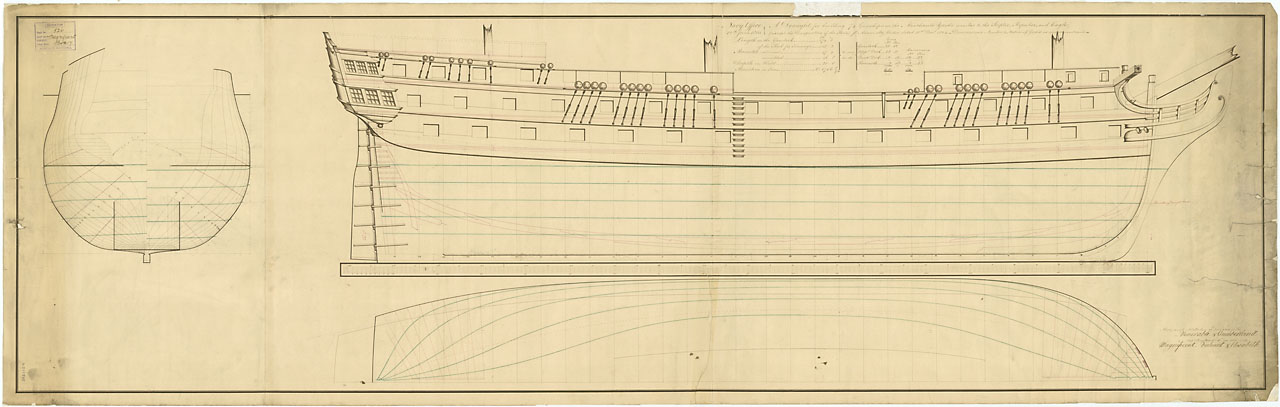
- Elizabeth

History

United Kingdom
- Name: Elizabeth
- Builder: Perry, Wells & Green, Blackwall Yard
- Laid down: August 1805
- Launched: 23 May 1807
- Commissioned: June 1807
- Fate: Broken up, 1820

General characteristics
- Class & type: Repulse-class ship of the line
- Tons burthen: 1,724 9/94 (bm)
- Length: 174 ft (53 m) (gundeck)
- Beam: 47 ft 7 in (14.5 m)
- Draught: 17 ft 10 in (5.4 m) (light)
- Depth of hold: 20 ft (6.1 m)
- Sail plan: Full-rigged ship
- Complement: 590
- Armament: 74 muzzle-loading, smoothbore guns; Gundeck: 28 × 32 pdr guns; Upper deck: 28 × 18 pdr guns; Quarterdeck: 2 × 18 pdr guns + 12 × 32 pdr carronades; Forecastle: 2 × 18 pdr guns + 2 × 32 pdr carronades; Poop deck: 6 × 18 pdr carronades

HMS Elizabeth was a 74-gun third-rate Repulse-class ship of the line built for the Royal Navy in the first decade of the 19th century. Completed in 1807, she played a minor role in the Napoleonic Wars.

== Description ==
Elizabeth measured 174 feet (53 m) on the gundeck and 143 feet 2 inches (43.6 m) on the keel. She had a beam of 47 feet 7 inches (14.5 m), a depth of hold of 20 feet (6.1 m) and had a tonnage of 1,724 9/94 tons burthen. The ship's draught was 13 feet 3 inches (4.0 m) forward and 187 feet 10 inches (57.3 m) aft at light load; fully loaded, her draught would be significantly deeper. The Repulse-class ships were armed with 74 muzzle-loading, smoothbore guns that consisted of twenty-eight 32-pounder guns on her lower gundeck and twenty-eight 18-pounder guns on her upper gundeck. Their forecastle mounted a pair of 18-pounder guns and two 32-pounder carronades. On their quarterdeck they carried two 18-pounders and a dozen 32-pounder carronades. Above the quarterdeck was their poop deck with half-a-dozen 18-pounder carronades. Their crew numbered 590 officers and ratings. The ships were fitted with three masts and ship-rigged.

== Construction and career ==
Elizabeth was the tenth ship of her name to serve in the Royal Navy. She was ordered on 24 January 1805 from Perry, Wells & Green as part of the second batch of five Repulse-class ships of the line designed by Sir William Rule, co-Surveyor of the Navy. The ship was laid down at their shipyard in Blackwall Yard in August and was launched on 23 May 1807. She was commissioned by Captain Henry Curzon in June and completed at Woolwich Dockyard by 3 July.

On 12 March 1812, as the merchant ship Ramoncita was returning from Lima and Cadiz, the French privateer Amelia captured her. However, HMS Virago recaptured Ramoncita. The salvage money notice stated that Virago had been in company with HMS Venerable, Cumberland, Elizabeth, and Plantagenet.

On 25 May 1814, Elizabeth captured the French naval xebec Aigle and her prize, the Glorioso off Corfu. Weazel shared in the prize money though it was the boats of Elizabeth that performed the actual capture in an action that in 1847 earned for their crews the Naval General Service Medal with clasp, "24 May Boat Service 1814". (Note: A first-class share of the prize money was worth £61 7¼d; a sixth-class share was worth 9s 2¼d.) Aigle was armed with 6 guns, a howitzer, and 3 swivel guns, and had a crew of 40 men. The capture of the Aigle represented the last naval surrender of the French Tricolour in the Napoleonic Wars.

== Fate ==
Elizabeth was broken up in 1820.
