= Sir Henry Harpur, 6th Baronet =

British politician

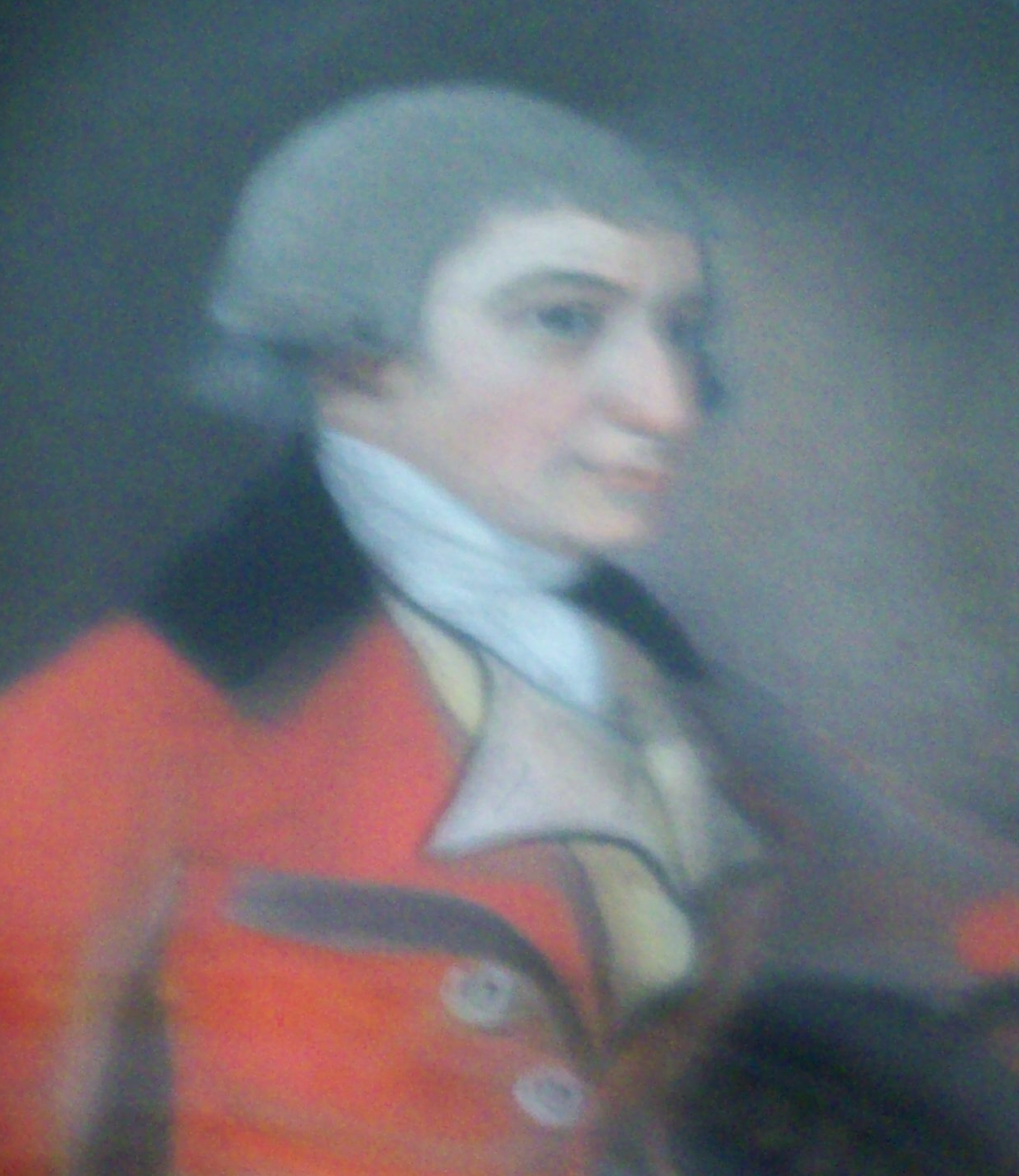
Portrait of Sir Henry Harpur, by Thomas Lawrence, 1784

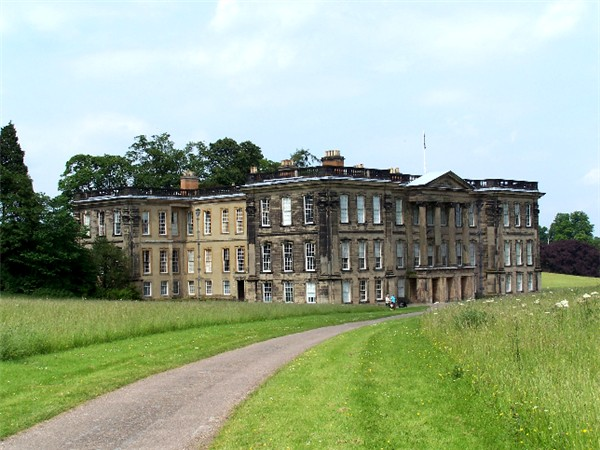
Calke Abbey, Ticknall, Derbys

Sir Henry Harpur, 6th Baronet (1739 – 10 February 1789) was an English Tory politician who represented the constituency of Derbyshire.

Harpur was the son of Sir Henry Harpur, 5th Baronet and Lady Caroline Manners, daughter of John Manners, 2nd Duke of Rutland. He succeeded his father to the Baronetcy in 1748. He lived at Calke Abbey, Derbyshire and 35 Upper Grosvenor Street, London.

He was returned as Member of Parliament for Derbyshire in 1761, but was replaced in a rare contested election in 1768. He served as High Sheriff of Derbyshire in 1774.

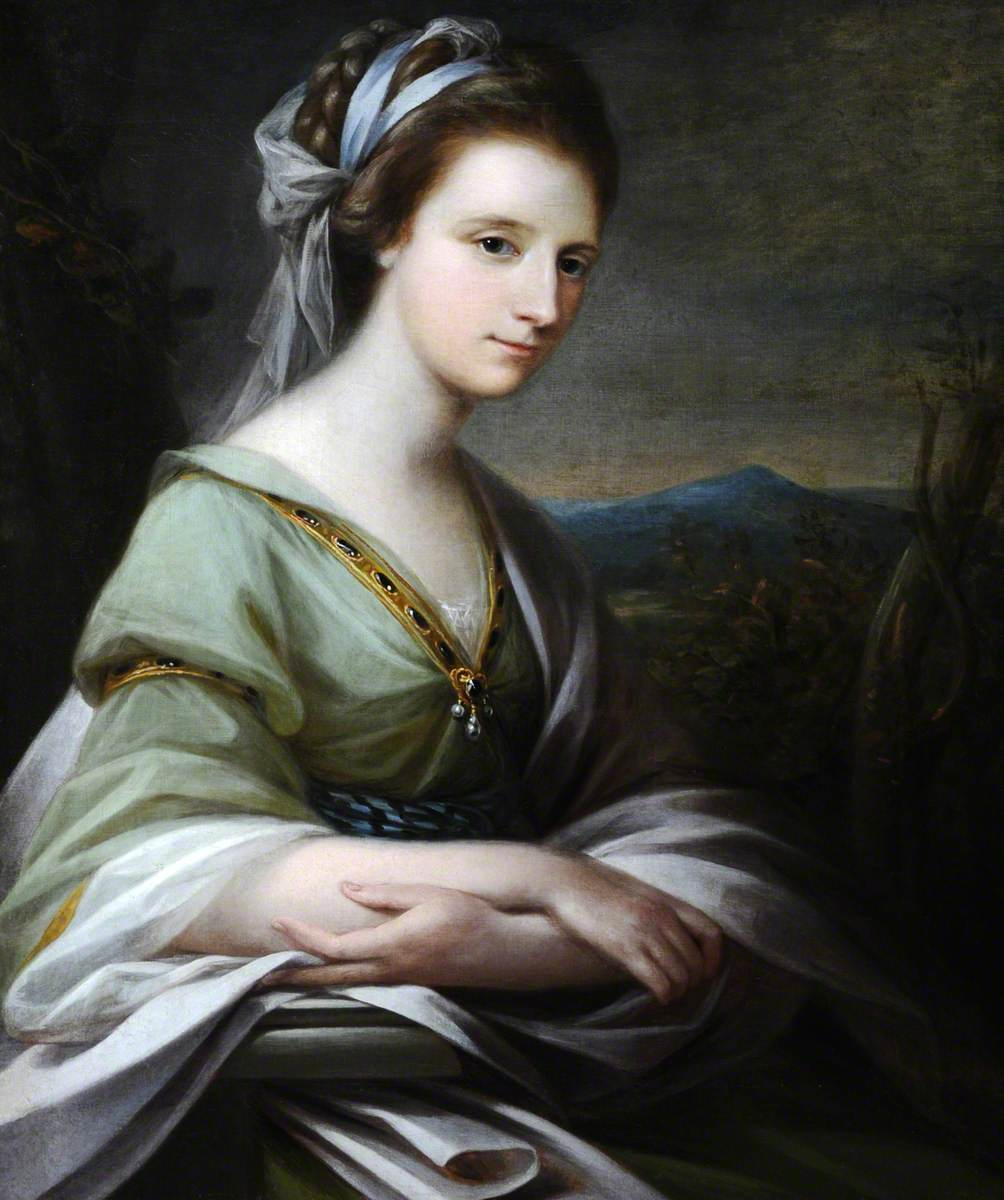
Lady Frances Greville (1744–1825), Lady Harpur by Angelica Kauffmann (1741-1807)

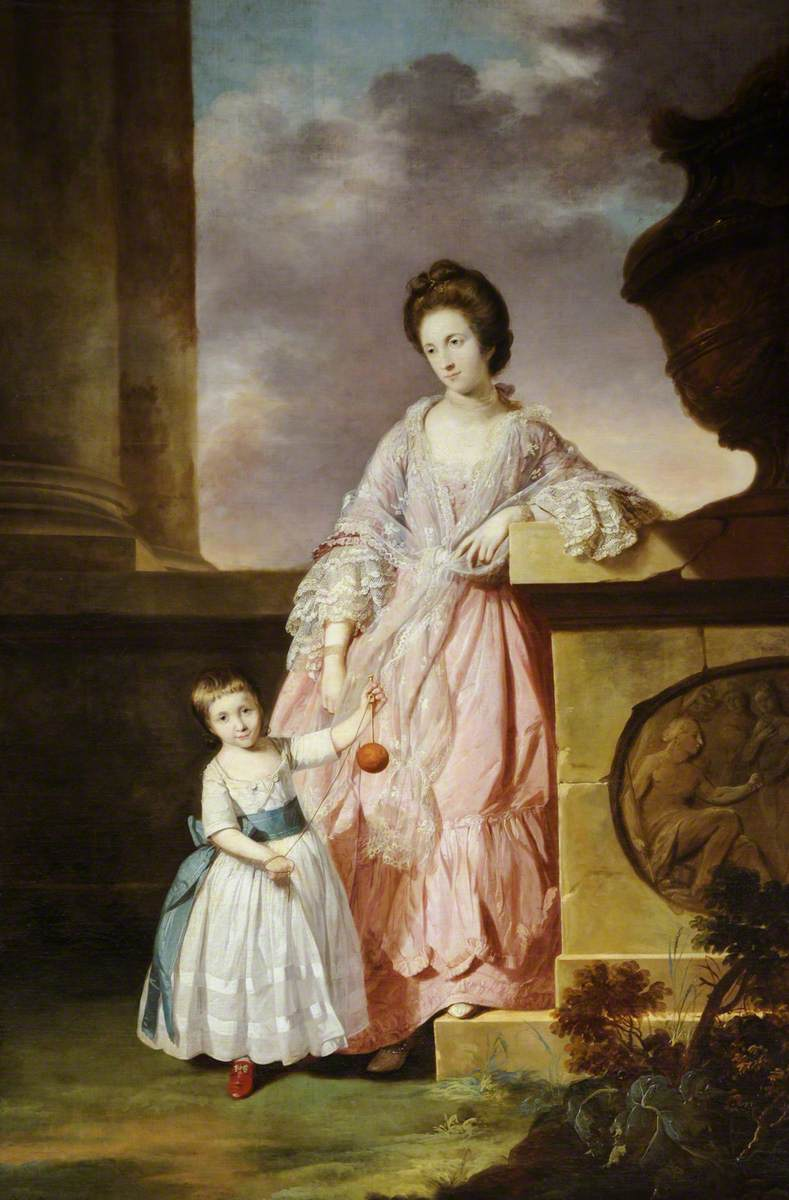
Lady Harpur, and Her Son Henry Harpur (1763–1819), Later Sir Henry Harpur Crewe, 7th Bt

Harpur married Frances Greville, second daughter of Francis Greville, 1st Earl of Warwick and 1st Earl Brooke. in 1762. He was succeeded by his son Sir Henry Crewe, 7th Baronet.

Parliament of the United Kingdom
Preceded by Sir Nathaniel Curzon, 5th Baronet; Lord George Augustus Cavendish	Member of Parliament for Derbyshire; 1761–1768; With: Lord George Augustus Cavendish	Succeeded by Godfrey Bagnall Clarke; Lord George Augustus Cavendish
Baronetage of England
Preceded by Henry Harpur	Baronet (of Calke Abbey); 1748–1789	Succeeded by Henry Harpur Crewe
Honorary titles
Preceded by Samuel Rotheram	High Sheriff of Derbyshire; 1774–1775	Succeeded by Robert Cheney
