= Ramoncita (1809 ship) =

British merchant ship (1809–1813

History

United Kingdom
- Name: Ramoncita
- Launched: 1809, Shields
- Captured: March 1812 and recaptured
- Fate: Condemned 1813

General characteristics
- Tons burthen: 319 (bm)

Ramoncita was launched at Shields in 1809. She was captured and recaptured in 1812, an event that gave rise to a case in insurance law and salvage. Then in 1813 she participated in a single ship action in which, despite heavy casualties, she was able to repel the attack of a US privateer. She capsized later in 1813 and was subsequently condemned.

== Career ==
Ramoncita first appeared in Lloyd's Register (LR) in 1809.

Year	Master	Owner	Trade	Source
1809	A.Merida	Anderson	London–Cadiz	LR

As Ramoncita was returning from Lima and Cadiz in early 1812, the French privateer Amelia captured her. (Note: Amelia is possibly Amélie, commissioned first in Brest in 1811, then in Morlaix in 1812. She was under François-Thomas-Jean Godefroy La Truite, and was captured by the British later in 1812.) However, the gun-brig HMS Virago recaptured Ramoncita and brought her into Cork. The salvage money notice for "El Ramoncita", master's name unknown, stated that Virago had been in company with HMS Venerable, Cumberland, Elizabeth, and Plantagenet. The recapture had taken place on 12 March 1812. (All four of the vessels in company with Virago were 74-gun third rate ships of the line.)

Charterers had chartered Ramoncita at a rate of £2 10s per register ton for a round trip. She was to take a cargo to Lima. She did so, and there took on a new cargo for Cadiz and London. She delivered part of her cargo to Cadiz, and was on her way to London when she was captured and recaptured. The situation gave rise to a decision on the law of salvage and was still relevant in 1894.

Year	Master	Owner	Trade	Source
1812	Silk; Venables	Anderson	Falmouth; London–Demerara	LR

On 2 January 1813, Ramoncita, Venables, master, arrived at Demerara. On her way from London she was off Madeira when she had encountered a United States privateer, Alexander, of Salem. Alexander was armed with 16 guns and had a crew of 150 men. An engagement of four-and-a half hours ensued, much of it with the vessels at half-pistol shot (about 25 yards), apart. When Alexander finally sheared off, Ramoncita raked her. Ramoncita's casualties amounted to five men killed and 12 wounded. (Note: On 20 May 1813, two British warships chased Alexander, of Salem, on shore. Only 20 of her crew escaped, though many crew members were aboard prizes. She also was carrying 100 British prisoners, who the Royal Navy recaptured. Alexander was gotten off)

One of the passengers aboard Ramoncita was Lieutenant Playter of the Royal Militia. At the commencement of the action he took charge of the men acting as marines. Playter so distinguished himself that when Ramoncita arrived at Demerara, the governor, General Carmichael, Lieutenant Governor of Demerara Essequibo, immediately promoted Playter to the rank of Captain.

== Fate ==
On 28 June 1813, Ramoncita capsized in the Demerara River. She was declared a total loss and condemned.
