= Lord Richard Cavendish (1752–1781) =

English aristocrat and politician (1752-1781)

- Portrait by Pompeo Batoni

Member of Parliament for Lancaster
- In office 1773–1780

Member of Parliament for Derbyshire
- In office 1780–1781

Personal details
- Born: 19 June 1752
- Died: 7 September 1781 (aged 29)
- Parents: William Cavendish, 4th Duke of Devonshire (father); Charlotte Cavendish, Marchioness of Hartington (mother)

Lord Richard Cavendish (19 June 1752 – 7 September 1781) was an English nobleman and politician.

== Biography ==
Richard Cavendish was born on 19 June, 1752. He was the second son of William Cavendish, 4th Duke of Devonshire and his wife, Charlotte. His sister Dorothy later married British Prime Minister William Cavendish-Bentinck, 3rd Duke of Portland.

Cavendish was educated in Hackney and at Trinity College, Cambridge.

In 1773, he entered the House of Commons as MP for Lancaster after winning a by-election on 15 September following the death of the incumbent Francis Reynolds. At this time, he moved to No. 1 Savile Row, London, where he resided until 1781. He was one of the few attendees at his brother Devonshire's wedding in 1774.

In 1778 and 1779, he served with the navy as a gentleman volunteer. In 1781, he went abroad in hopes of recovering his failing health; but he continued to decline and died unmarried in Naples.

Parliament of Great Britain
Preceded by Francis Reynolds; Sir George Warren	Member of Parliament for Lancaster; 1773–1780 with Sir George Warren	Succeeded by Wilson Braddyl; Abraham Rawlinson
Preceded by Lord George Augustus Cavendish; Hon. Nathaniel Curzon	Member of Parliament for Derbyshire; 1780–1781 with Hon. Nathaniel Curzon	Succeeded by Hon. Nathaniel Curzon; Lord George Augustus Cavendish
