= Godfrey Bagnall Clarke =

Godfrey Bagnall Clarke (c. 1742 – 26 December 1774), of Sutton Scarsdale Hall in Derbyshire, was a British Member of Parliament, representing Derbyshire.

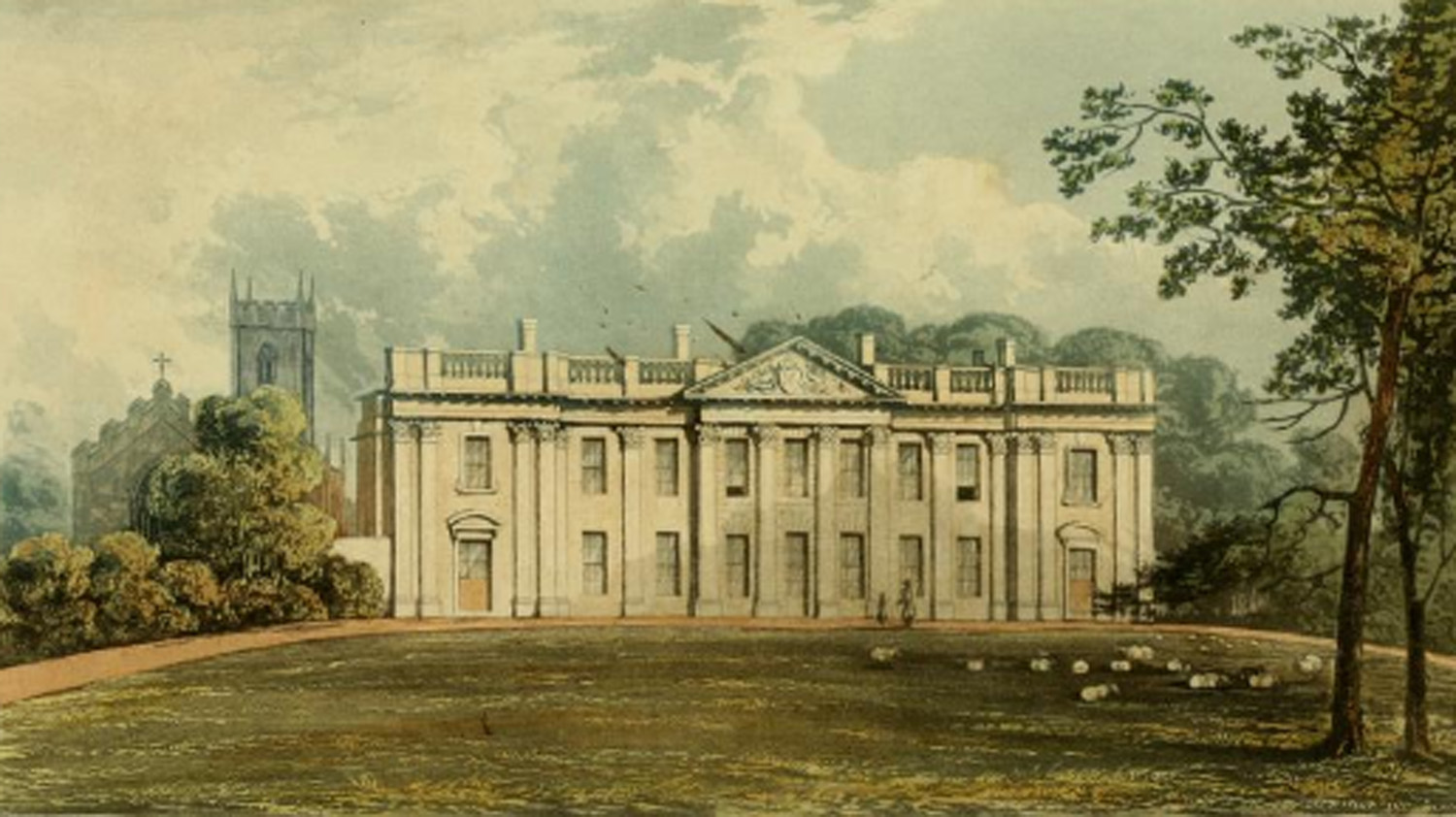
Sutton Scarsdale Hall

He was the eldest son of Godfrey Clarke and his wife Anne, the daughter and heiress of German Pole of Radbourne, Derbyshire and undertook the Grand Tour to Italy.

Clarke was elected to Parliament in 1768, winning a contested election (a rare event in Derbyshire) to beat one of the sitting MPs, Sir Henry Harpur. Clarke's personal politics are unknown, and he seems never to have spoken in the House of Commons, but he was supported by the Derbyshire Tories and voted consistently with the opposition. He was re-elected unopposed in October 1774 but was already ill, and died only two months later, unmarried and in his early thirties.

His estates at Sutton, Chilcote Hall and Somersall Hall passed to his sister who married Joseph Hart Pryce (Clarke from 1787) and then to their daughter Anna Maria Clarke who married Walter Butler, 18th Earl of Ormonde.

Clarke was a great friend of the historian Edward Gibbon, whom he met while on the Grand Tour, and Gibbon executed his will.

Parliament of Great Britain
| Preceded by Lord George Cavendish; Sir Henry Harpur | Member of Parliament for Derbyshire; 1768–1774; With: Lord George Cavendish | Succeeded by Lord George Cavendish; Hon. Nathaniel Curzon |
