= William Cavendish, 3rd Duke of Devonshire =

British politician

His Grace The Duke of Devonshire KG PC
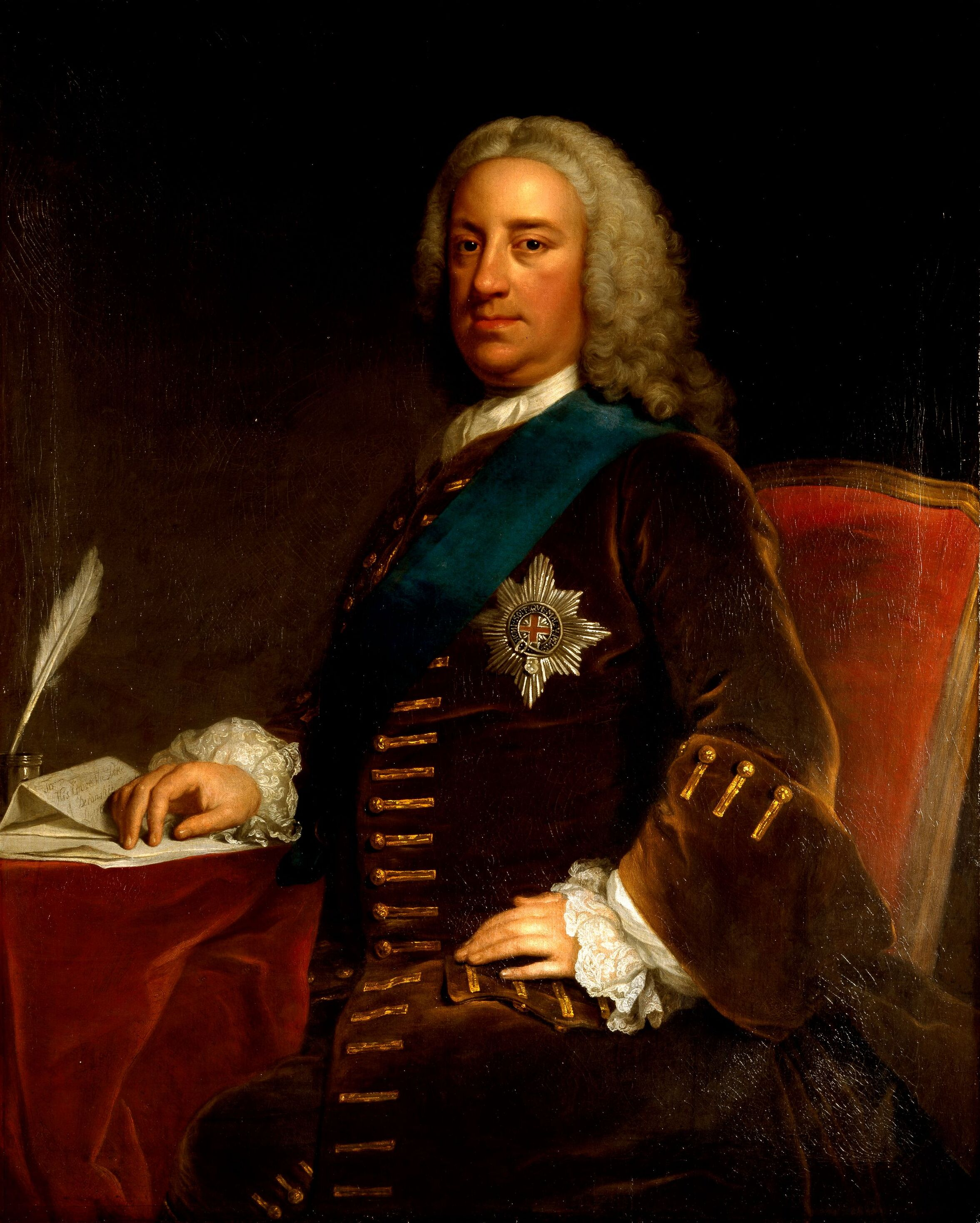
- Portrait by George Knapton

Lord Lieutenant of Ireland
- In office 1737–1744
- Monarch: George II
- Preceded by: The Duke of Dorset
- Succeeded by: The Earl of Chesterfield

Lord Steward
- In office 1733–1737
- Monarch: George II
- In office 1744–1749
- Monarch: George II

Lord Privy Seal
- In office 1731–1733
- Monarch: George II
- Succeeded by: The Viscount Lonsdale

Personal details
- Born: 26 September 1698
- Died: 5 December 1755 (aged 57)
- Spouse: Catherine Hoskins
- Children: 7, including William, John, Frederick, and George
- Parent(s): William Cavendish, 2nd Duke of Devonshire; Rachel Russell

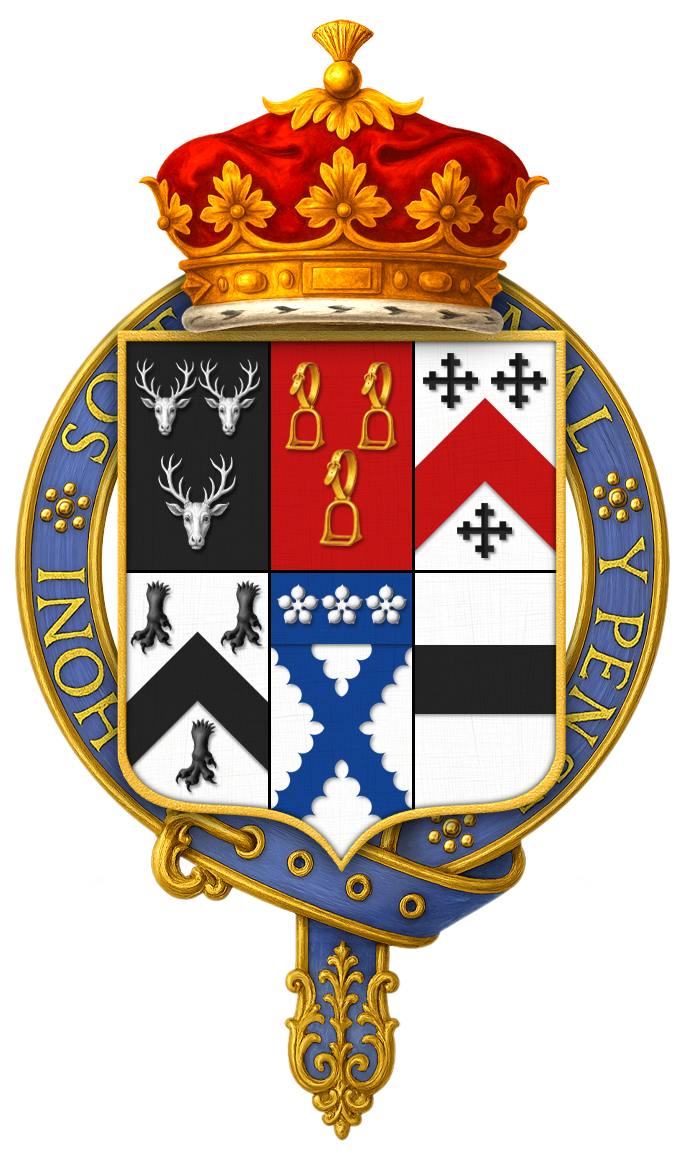
Quartered coat of arms of William Cavendish, 3rd Duke of Devonshire, KG, PC

William Cavendish, 3rd Duke of Devonshire, KG, PC (26 September 1698 – 5 December 1755) was a British Whig politician who sat in the House of Commons of Great Britain from 1721 to 1729.

== Life ==
Cavendish was the son of William Cavendish, 2nd Duke of Devonshire, and his wife, the Hon. Rachel Russell, and was known as Marquess of Hartington.

Like his father, Lord Hartington was active in public life. He was returned unopposed as member of parliament for Lostwithiel at a by-election in 1721. At the 1722 general election he was returned unopposed as MP for Grampound. He was also unopposed when he was returned as MP for Huntingdonshire at the 1727 general election. He surrendered the seat in 1729 when his father's death sent him to the House of Lords. He was made a Privy Counsellor in 1731. He served as Lord Privy Seal from 1731 to 1733, when he was invested as a Knight of the Garter. He later served for seven years as Lord Lieutenant of Ireland.

In 1733, he commissioned William Kent to design the first baby carriage with wheels. It was ornately decorated and was pulled by a goat or a small pony.

He sold the Old Devonshire House at 48 Boswell Street, Theobald's Road, in Bloomsbury, and in 1734 engaged the architect William Kent to build a new Cavendish House in fashionable Piccadilly. In 1739, he was enlisted as a founding governor of a new children's charity, the Foundling Hospital in Bloomsbury, London, which aimed to alleviate the problem of infants being abandoned by destitute mothers and which later became a centre for art and music.

During the Jacobite rising of 1745 the Duke raised a militia unit in support of the King known as the Derbyshire Blues, which mustered at the George Inn, Derby, on 3 December 1745.

== Marriage and issue ==
On 27 March 1718, he married Catherine Hoskins (1700–1777), daughter of John Hoskins of Oxted (1640–1717) and Catherine Hale (1673–1703).

The Duke and Duchess had seven children:

- Lady Caroline Cavendish (22 May 1719 – 20 January 1760), who married William Ponsonby, 2nd Earl of Bessborough, and had issue.
- William Cavendish, 4th Duke of Devonshire (1720 – 2 October 1764)
- Lord George Augustus Cavendish (died 2 May 1794), died unmarried.
- Lady Elizabeth Cavendish (born before 1727 – died 1796), married John Ponsonby and had issue.
- Lady Rachel Cavendish (7 June 1727 – 8 May 1805), who married Horatio Walpole, 1st Earl of Orford.
- Field Marshal Lord Frederick Cavendish (c. 1729 – 21 October 1803), died unmarried.
- Lord John Cavendish (c. 1734–1796)

Parliament of Great Britain
Preceded by Galfridus Walpole; John Newsham	Member of Parliament for Lostwithiel; 1721–1724; With: John Newsham 1721–1722; Lord Stanhope 1722–1724	Succeeded by Sir Orlando Bridgeman, Bt; Henry Parsons
Preceded by Hon. John West; Richard West	Member of Parliament for Grampound; 1722–1727; With: Humphry Morice	Succeeded by Humphry Morice; Philip Hawkins
Preceded by John Bigg; John Proby	Member of Parliament for Huntingdonshire; 1727–1729; With: John Bigg	Succeeded by John Bigg; Robert Piggott
Honorary titles
Preceded by The Duke of St Albans	Captain of the Gentlemen Pensioners; 1726–1731	Succeeded by The Earl of Burlington
Preceded by The 2nd Duke of Devonshire	Lord Lieutenant of Derbyshire; 1729–1755	Succeeded by The 4th Duke of Devonshire
Political offices
Preceded by In Commission	Lord Privy Seal; 1731–1733	Succeeded by The Viscount Lonsdale
Preceded by The Earl of Chesterfield	Lord Steward; 1733–1737	Succeeded by The Duke of Dorset
Preceded by The Duke of Dorset	Lord Lieutenant of Ireland; 1737–1744	Succeeded by The Earl of Chesterfield
Preceded by The Duke of Dorset	Lord Steward; 1744–1749	Succeeded by The Duke of Marlborough
Peerage of England
Preceded by William Cavendish	Duke of Devonshire; 1729–1755	Succeeded by William Cavendish
Preceded by William Cavendish	Baron Cavendish of Hardwick (descended by acceleration); 1729–1751	Succeeded by William Cavendish
