= Catherine Cavendish, Duchess of Devonshire =

Her Grace The Duchess of Devonshire
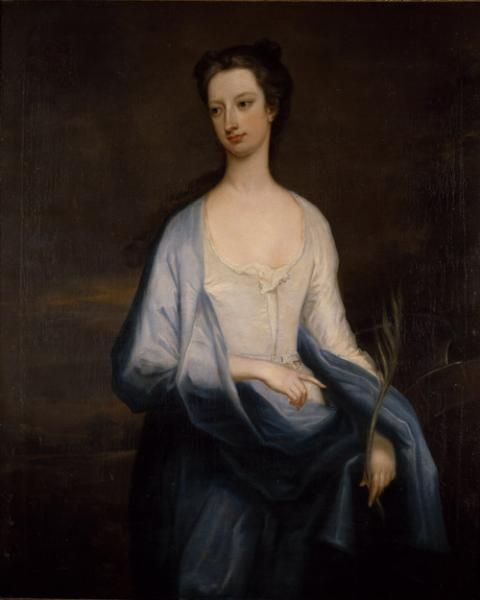

Personal details
- Born: 1700
- Died: 8 May 1777 (aged 76–77) Paris, France
- Spouse: William Cavendish, 3rd Duke of Devonshire (m. 1718; died 1755)
- Children: Caroline Ponsonby, Countess of Bessborough; William Cavendish, 4th Duke of Devonshire; Lord George Cavendish; Lady Elizabeth Ponsonby; Rachel Walpole, Baroness Walpole; Lord Frederick Cavendish; Lord John Cavendish

Catherine Cavendish, Duchess of Devonshire (née Hoskins; 1700 – 8 May 1777), was the wife of William Cavendish, 3rd Duke of Devonshire, and mother of the 4th Duke.

== Family background ==
She was the only child and heiress of John Hoskins of Oxted (1640–16 May 1717), and his wife, the former Catherine Hale (1673–1703), daughter of William Hale. Her mother's brother was the judge, Sir Bernard Hale, and her first cousins were the army generals Bernard and John Hale.

== Marriage and children ==
She married Cavendish, then an MP and known as the Marquess of Hartington, on 27 March 1718. The Marquess inherited the dukedom in 1729.

Their children were:

- Lady Caroline Cavendish (1719–1760), who married William Ponsonby, 2nd Earl of Bessborough, and had children.
- William Cavendish, 4th Duke of Devonshire (1720–1764), who married Charlotte Boyle, 6th Baroness Clifford, and had children.
- Lord George Augustus Cavendish, MP (died 2 May 1794), who died unmarried.
- Lady Elizabeth Cavendish (before 1727–1796), who married John Ponsonby, MP, and had children.
- Lady Rachel Cavendish (1727–1805), who married Horatio Walpole, 1st Earl of Orford, and had children. was a British Whig politician.
- Field Marshal Lord Frederick Cavendish (c.1729–1803), who died unmarried.
- Lord John Cavendish (c.1734–1796), who died unmarried.

In 1733, Devonshire House (formerly Berkeley House), their London home, burned down while in the process of refurbishment, possibly because of the builders' carelessness. They employed William Kent to design their new residence, which stood until the 1920s, when much of the contents was transferred to Chatsworth House, the family seat in Derbyshire.

== Later life ==
The duke died in 1755 and was succeeded by their eldest son, William, to whose marriage to the exceptionally wealthy Lady Charlotte Boyle Catherine was bitterly opposed. However, at her husband's death, since Charlotte had died the previous year and the young duke did not remarry, Catherine remained mistress of Chatsworth until her grandson, the 5th Duke, married 17-year-old Georgiana Spencer in 1774.
