= HMS Plantagenet =

Ship of the line of the Royal Navy

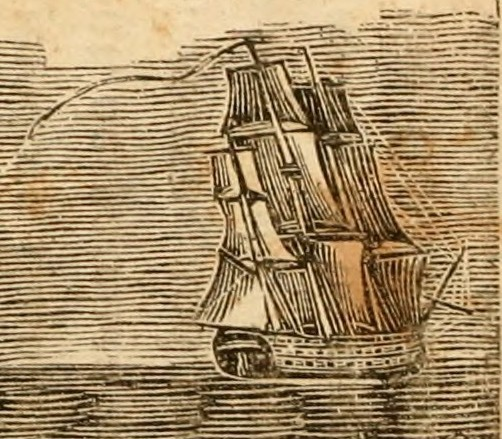
- Plantagenet

History

United Kingdom
- Name: HMS Plantagenet
- Ordered: 6 November 1794
- Builder: Woolwich Dockyard
- Laid down: November 1798
- Launched: 22 October 1801
- Fate: Broken up, 1817

General characteristics
- Class & type: 74-gun third rate ship of the line
- Tons burthen: 1777 (bm)
- Length: 181 ft (55 m) (gundeck)
- Beam: 47 ft (14 m)
- Depth of hold: 19 ft 9 in (6.02 m)
- Propulsion: Sails
- Sail plan: Full-rigged ship
- Armament: Gundeck: 28 × 32-pounder guns; Upper gundeck: 30 × 24-pounder guns; QD: 12 × 9-pounder guns; Fc: 4 × 9-pounder guns

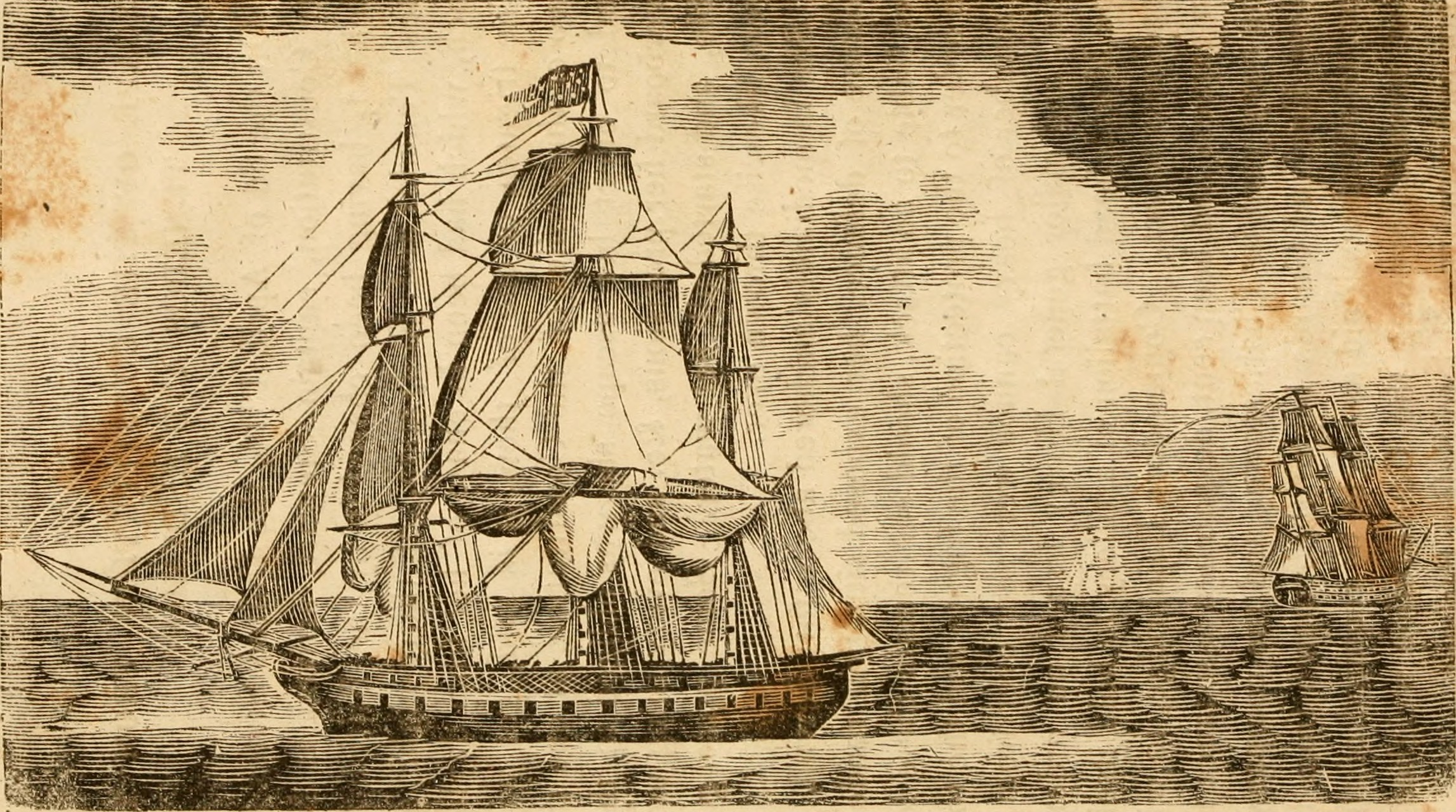
USS President and HMS Plantagenet February 1814

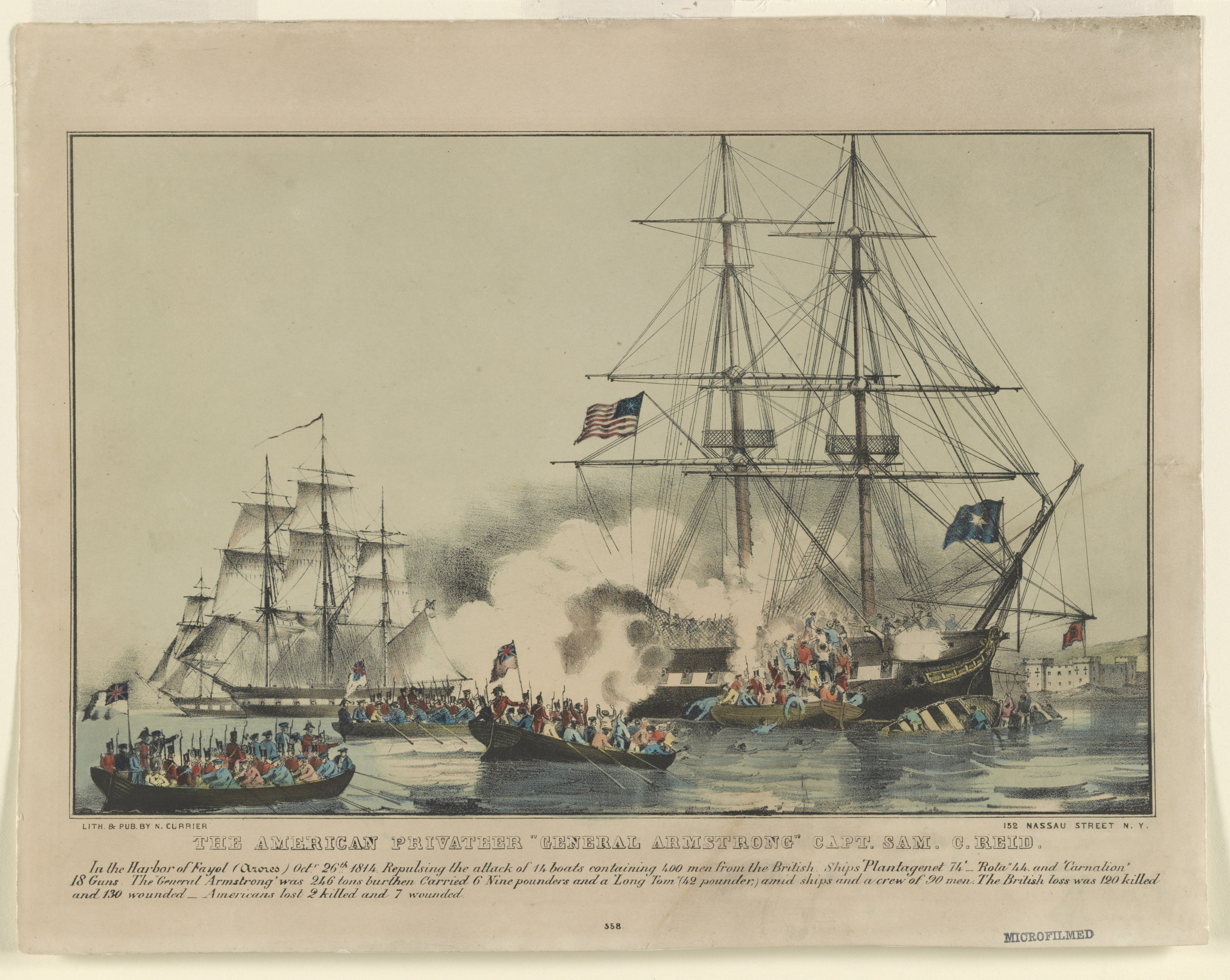
British ships Plantagenet, Rota and Carnation attack the American privateer General Armstrong on 26 October 1814 at Fayal (the Azores)

HMS Plantagenet was a 74-gun third rate ship of the line of the Royal Navy, launched on 22 October 1801 at Woolwich. She was designed by Sir William Rule as one of the 'large class' 74s, and was the only ship built to her draught. As a large 74, she carried 24-pounder guns on her upper gun deck instead of the 18-pounder guns found on the middling and common class 74s.

== Career ==
In 1803 she and Rosario captured the French privateer sloop Atalante, of 22 guns, after a chase of nine hours. Plantagenet took off 90 Frenchmen and put a prize crew of 20 Englishmen, under the command of Lieutenant Batt, on board Atalante. After the two vessels had separated, 68 Frenchmen, who had concealed themselves below decks, rose and attempted to retake their vessel. The British were able to subdue the Frenchmen, but not before one British sailor had been shot dead by one of his crewmates, who had mistaken the dead man for a Frenchman. The later report described Atalante as being armed with sixteen 6-pounder guns and 160 men. She had been out of Bordeaux five days but had captured nothing. The Royal Navy took Atalante into service as Hawk.

In June 1804 Plantagenet, Captain De Courcy, escorted the China Fleet of the British East India Company from Saint Helena back to England. This was the fleet that had scared off a French squadron of warships in the Battle of Pulo Aura.

On 27 September 1810 Plantagenet and Daphne shared in the capture of the Danish schooner Toujours Fidele.

On 12 March 1812, as the merchant ship Ramoncita was returning from Lima and Cadiz, the French privateer Amelia captured her. However, HMS Virago recaptured Ramoncita. The salvage money notice stated that Virago had been in company with HMS Venerable, Cumberland, Elizabeth, and Plantagenet.

During the War of 1812, as the ship was moored near Norfolk, Virginia, attempts were made to destroy her with torpedoes built to Robert Fulton's specifications, but this came to nothing.

On 16 December 1813, Plantagenet's boats captured the American letter of marque schooner Rapid, off Havana. Rapid, Captain James Frazier, had been launched at Talbot County, Maryland in 1813. She was of 115 tons (bm), had a crew of 20, and was armed with one nine-pounder gun. (Note: Head money was paid in December 1815. A first-class share was worth £sd18 3s 4d; a sixth-class share, that of an ordinary seaman, was worth 1s 2¼d.)

== Fate ==
Plantagenet was broken up in 1817.
