= Henry Curzon =

Royal Navy Admiral (1765–1846)

Admiral Henry Curzon
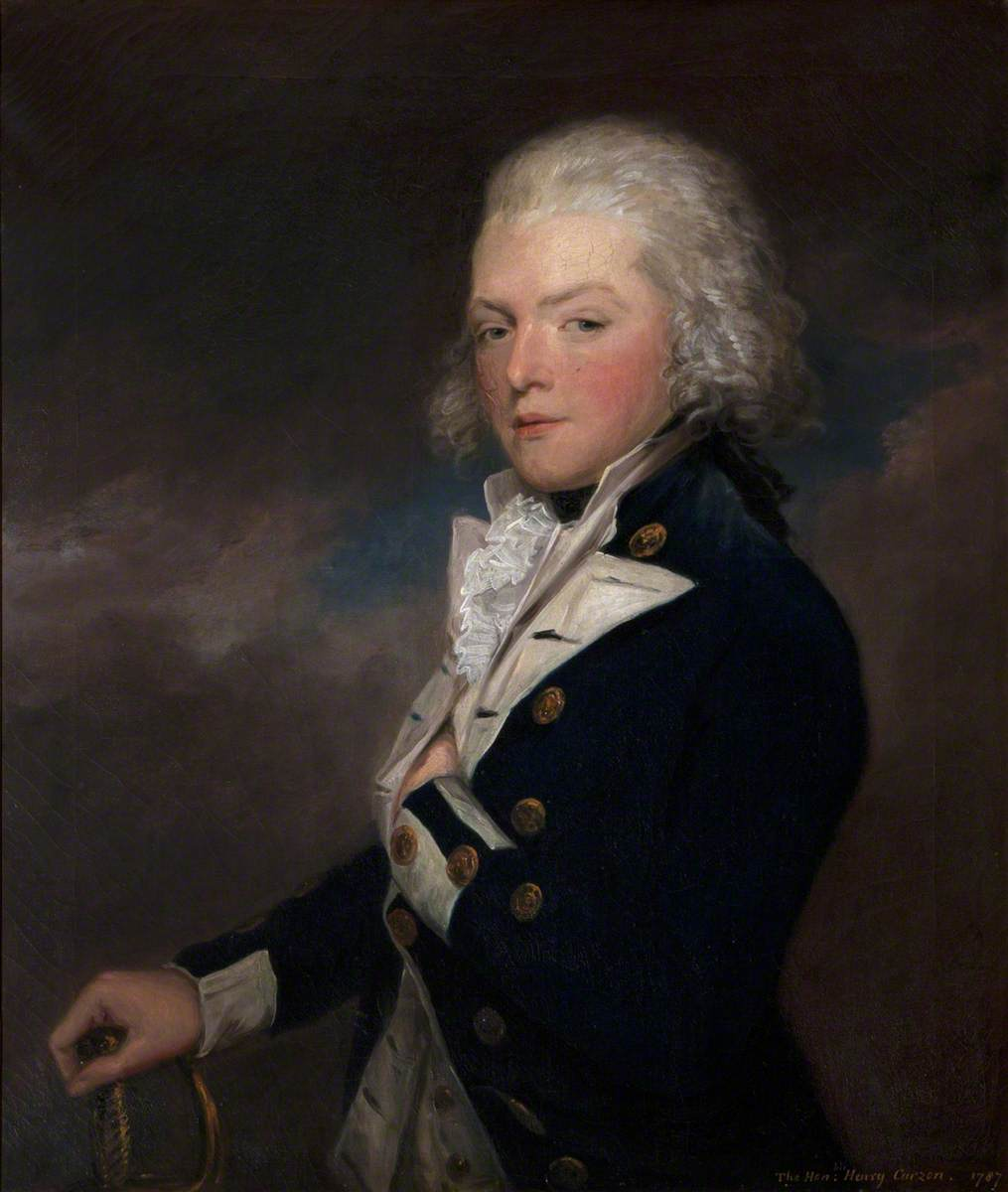
- Portrait by William Hamilton
- Born: 24 May 1765
- Died: 2 May 1846 (aged 80)
- Military career
- Allegiance: Great Britain; United Kingdom
- Branch: Royal Navy
- Service years: 1776–1810
- Rank: Admiral
- Commands: HMS Brisk; HMS Tisiphone; HMS Lapwing; HMS Pallas; HMS Indefatigable; HMS Elizabeth
- Conflicts: American Revolutionary War; Great Siege of Gibraltar; Battle of Providien; Battle of Negapatam; Battle of Trincomalee; Battle of Cuddalore; French Revolutionary Wars; Glorious First of June; Cornwallis's Retreat; Napoleonic Wars; Anglo-Russian War

Admiral Henry Curzon (24 May 1765 – 2 May 1846) was a Royal Navy officer who held commands during the French Revolutionary Wars and the Napoleonic Wars.

Curzon was the fifth son of Nathaniel Curzon, 1st Baron Scarsdale, and his wife Caroline. He first entered the Navy on 14 October 1776 as an able seaman aboard Aeolus. When Aeolus returned from the West Indies in 1780, he became a midshipman aboard Magnanime. Magnanime was sent out to assist in the Relief of Gibraltar in 1781, and then to the East Indies in 1782, to reinforce the fleet under Sir Edward Hughes. Curzon transferred aboard the flagship, Superb, and fought in the battles of Providien, Negapatam, and Trincomalee. On 1 February 1783, he received a lieutenancy on Monarca and was with that ship at the Battle of Cuddalore in 1783, his last action in the East.

From July 1784 to March 1790, he was successively lieutenant aboard Flora, Ambuscade, and Aquilon, and first lieutenant of Adamant, then flagship of Sir Richard Hughes on the North American Station. He was sent home in 1790 as acting commander of Brisk. His rank as commander was confirmed on 21 September 1790 and he was given the fireship Tisiphone. On 22 November 1790, he was promoted post captain.

In June 1791, Curzon was given the sixth rate Lapwing, and was sent to Villefranche-sur-Mer to protect British property at the capture of Nice by the French in 1792. When France declared war in 1793, Lapwing escorted a convoy back from Gibraltar. On 22 January 1794, Curzon was given the fifth rate frigate Pallas, which he commanded at the Glorious First of June and in Cornwallis's Retreat. At the latter action, Cornwallis, in Royal Sovereign, kept Pallas close by to repeat his signals to the fleet, and Curzon was mentioned in despatches for his good performance. Pallas was lost when she went aground under Mount Batten in a storm on 4 April 1798.

On 28 February 1799, Curzon took command of Indefatigable, and took part in a number of captures, including that of the corvette Vénus in 1800, accompanying the expedition to Ferrol in the autumn of that year. In June 1801, he was invalided out of the service due to severe ill-health. He did not return to command until 10 June 1807, when he was given the third rate Elizabeth. Elizabeth was part of the fleet under Sir Charles Cotton that blockaded Lisbon during the "Anglo-Russian War", escorted the Russians to Portsmouth, and helped cover the evacuation after Corunna. He was sent out to the Brazil station in early 1809 to search for a French fleet supposed to be bound for the River Plate. Having made a junction with the forces there and found no sign of the French, Curzon escorted a homeward-bound convoy and returned in April 1810. He found he had been appointed a Colonel of Marines on 25 October 1809. His last command was of a squadron blockading Cherbourg.

On 31 July 1810, Curzon was promoted to rear admiral, ending his seagoing command. He obtained no further employment from the Admiralty, but he became a vice-admiral on 4 June 1814 and admiral on 22 July 1830. He was unmarried and left no children when he died at his residence in Derby on 2 May 1846.
