= William Cavendish, 4th Duke of Devonshire =

Prime Minister of Great Britain from 1756 to 1757

His Grace The Duke of Devonshire KG PC
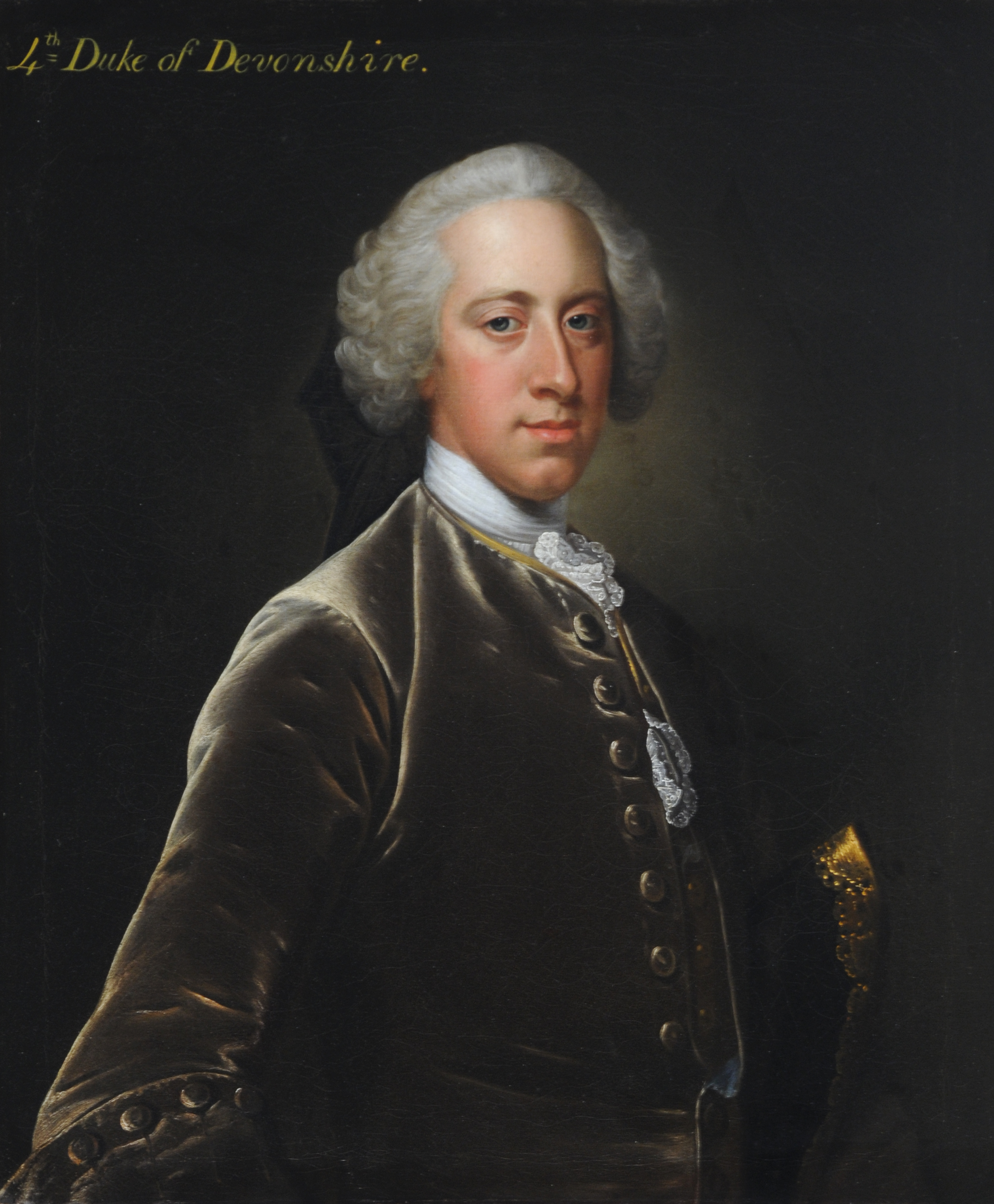
- Portrait by Thomas Hudson, c. 1750s

Prime Minister of Great Britain
- In office 16 November 1756 – 29 June 1757
- Monarch: George II
- Preceded by: The Duke of Newcastle
- Succeeded by: The Duke of Newcastle

Personal details
- Born: 8 May 1720 St Martin's-in-the-Fields, London, England
- Died: 2 October 1764 (aged 44) Spa, Austrian Netherlands
- Resting place: Derby Cathedral
- Party: Whig
- Spouse: Charlotte Boyle, 6th Baroness Clifford (m. 1748; died 1754)
- Children: William Cavendish, 5th Duke of Devonshire; Dorothy Bentinck, Duchess of Portland; Lord Richard Cavendish; George Cavendish, 1st Earl of Burlington
- Parent(s): William Cavendish, 3rd Duke of Devonshire; Catherine Hoskins

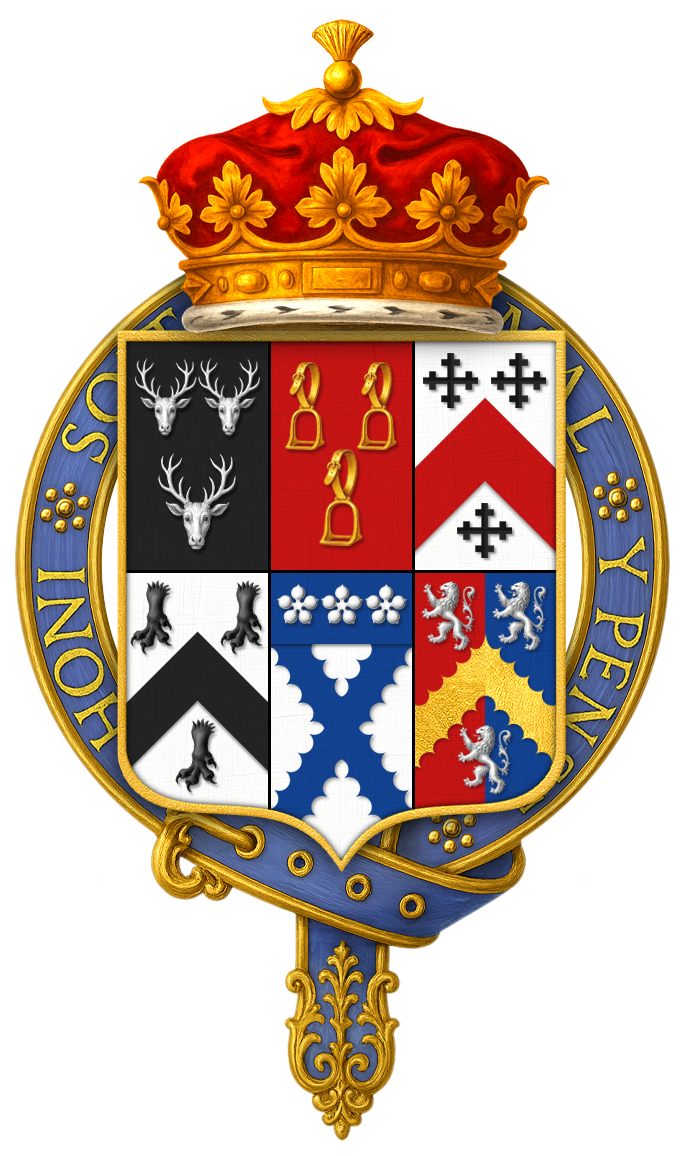
Coat of arms of William Cavendish, 4th Duke of Devonshire, KG, PC

William Cavendish, 4th Duke of Devonshire (8 May 1720 – 2 October 1764), styled Lord Cavendish before 1729, and Marquess of Hartington between 1729 and 1755, was a British Whig statesman and nobleman who was briefly nominal Prime Minister of Great Britain. He was the first son of William Cavendish, 3rd Duke of Devonshire and his wife, Catherine (née Hoskins). He is also a great-great-great-great-great-grandfather of King Charles III through the king's maternal great-grandmother, Cecilia Bowes-Lyon, Countess of Strathmore and Kinghorne.

In October 1762, George III suspected that Devonshire and Thomas Pelham-Holles, 1st Duke of Newcastle, were plotting against him. He had mistaken a visit by Devonshire as a tender of resignation, but George refused to see him in person. Four days later, George personally struck out Devonshire's name from the list of Privy Councillors.

Cavendish's health declined during the 1760s. He visited the town of Spa in the Austrian Netherlands for treatment in its mineral baths, but he died there in October 1764. Dying at the age of 44 years and 147 days, Devonshire remains the shortest-lived British prime minister. Devonshire was buried at Derby Cathedral.

== Early life ==
The eldest of four sons of William Cavendish, 3rd Duke of Devonshire, and Catherine (née Hoskins), he was baptised on 1 June 1720 at St Martin's-in-the-Fields in London. He was possibly educated privately at home before going on a grand tour in France and Italy, accompanied by his tutor, in 1739–40.

== Early career: 1741–1756 ==
He was elected MP for Derbyshire in 1741 and 1747. Devonshire was a supporter of Sir Robert Walpole and, after Walpole's fall from power, of the Pelhams. Henry Pelham wrote to Devonshire's father that he was "our mainstay among the young ones, of themselves liable to wander".

Horace Walpole described him as "a favourite by descent of the Old Whigs" and as "errant [a] bigot to the Pelham faction as ever Jacques Clément was to the Jesuits".

He had been offered the post of governor to the Prince of Wales but he declined.

Pelham appointed him Master of the Horse, a post he held until 1755. To take it he left the House of Commons for the Lords by writ of acceleration as Baron Cavendish and joined the Privy Council.

In 1753, as Marquess of Hartington, he acted as intermediary in arranging a Treasury pension for the journalist James Ralph, editor of the opposition weekly The Protester; after an introduction by David Garrick he brokered terms under which Ralph withdrew from political writing.

Devonshire supported the Duke of Newcastle after Henry Pelham's death in 1754 and was Lord Lieutenant of Ireland from 2 April 1755 until 3 January 1757 in Newcastle's administration. In April 1755 he was one of the Lords Justices of the realm upon the King's absence in Hanover.

Devonshire succeeded his father as Duke of Devonshire in December 1755 after his death.

The Seven Years' War was going badly for Britain under the leadership of the Duke of Newcastle and when he resigned in October 1756, George II eventually asked Devonshire to form an administration. Devonshire accepted on the condition that his tenure would last only until the end of the parliamentary session. Devonshire believed his duty to the King required an administration capable of prosecuting the war successfully.

== Prime Minister: 1756–1757 ==
Devonshire was given the Garter and appointed First Lord of the Treasury (most historians consider him prime minister during this service) in November 1756, and he served as First Lord until May 1757 in an administration effectively run by William Pitt. Devonshire's administration secured increased money for the war, troops were sent to America and a Militia Act was passed.

The administration was eventually brought down for a variety of reasons including the opposition of George II and the alleged mishandling of the trial and execution of Admiral John Byng. It was replaced by the Pitt–Newcastle ministry headed by the Duke of Newcastle and including Pitt, Henry Fox and the Duke of Bedford. This government steered Britain through most of the Seven Years' War, leading the country to ultimate victory.

== Lord Chamberlain: 1757–1762 ==
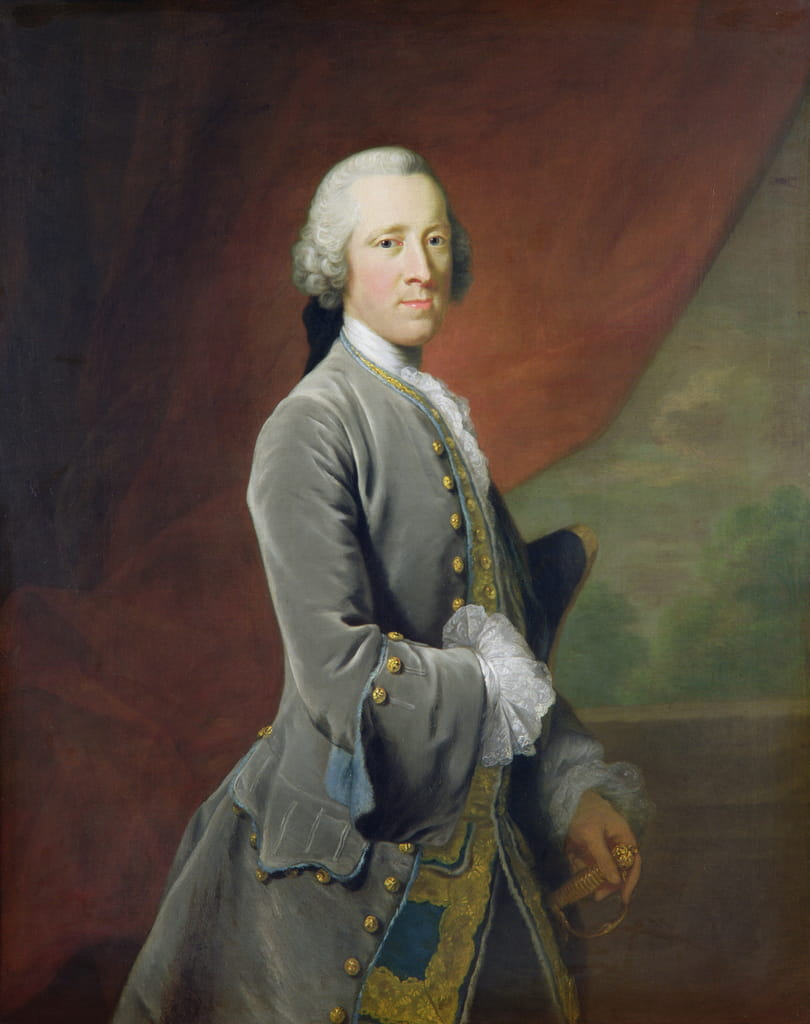
The Duke of Devonshire by Thomas Hudson, c. 1750s

Devonshire was Lord Chamberlain in Newcastle's government (with a seat in the inner Cabinet) and his relations with him were close. George II died in October 1760 and was succeeded by his grandson George III, who was suspicious of Devonshire and Newcastle. When Newcastle resigned in May 1762 Devonshire said that he would rarely attend Lord Bute's councils.

When, in October, George III requested that he attend a Cabinet meeting on peace terms, Devonshire declined, claiming he had inadequate knowledge of the subject.

On 28 October, travelling from Kew to London, the King overtook Devonshire and Newcastle's coach in the belief that the two dukes were plotting and that Devonshire was coming to tender his resignation. He was in fact passing through London to Chatsworth House and had come to give his leave to the King. When Devonshire arrived, George III refused to see him, as he later wrote:

"I ordered the page to tell him I would not see him, on which he bid him ask me with whom he should leave his wand...I said he would receive my orders...On the Duke of Devonshire's going away he said to the page, God bless you, it will be very long before you see me here again

At a meeting of the Privy Council four days later the King personally struck out Devonshire's name from the list of Privy Councillors. In the opinion of one of his biographers, John Brooke, "Few things in King George III's long life show him in so poor a light".

== Last years: 1762–1764 ==
Devonshire resigned his Lord Lieutenancy of Derbyshire in solidarity with Newcastle and Rockingham when they were dismissed from their Lord Lieutenancies.

For a long time he had a weak constitution, and he gradually grew more ill during these years. He ultimately died in the Austrian Netherlands, where he had gone to take the waters at Spa. His death was a large political loss to his allies, the Whig magnates such as the Duke of Newcastle. Dying at the age of 44 years and 147 days, he remains the shortest-lived British prime minister. Devonshire was buried at Derby Cathedral.

== Family ==
He married Lady Charlotte Elizabeth Boyle, 6th Baroness Clifford (1731–1754), the daughter and heiress of Richard Boyle, 3rd Earl of Burlington of the first creation, a famous architect and art collector and Lady Dorothy Saville. The wedding was held at Carlton House, the then residence of the Dowager Lady Burlington, situated between St James' Park and Pall Mall, by special licence on the 28 March 1748. Through Charlotte, the Devonshires inherited Chiswick House and Burlington House in London; Bolton Abbey and Londesborough Hall in Yorkshire; and Lismore Castle in County Waterford, Ireland. The Duke employed Capability Brown to landscape the garden and park at Chatsworth House, his main residence. He hired James Paine to design the new stable block.

The Duke had four children:

- William Cavendish, 5th Duke of Devonshire (1748–1811)
- Lady Dorothy Cavendish (27 August 1750 – 3 June 1794). Married William Cavendish-Bentinck, 3rd Duke of Portland, who also became prime minister.
- Lord Richard Cavendish (1752–1781)
- George Augustus Henry Cavendish, created 1st Earl of Burlington of the second creation (1754–1834). Lord Burlington's grandson, the 2nd Earl of Burlington, would later inherit the Devonshire dukedom as 7th Duke of Devonshire.

== Arms ==
Coat of arms of William Cavendish, 4th Duke of Devonshire
Crest A serpent nowed proper. Escutcheon Sable three stags' heads caboshed argent. Supporters Two bucks proper, each wreathed round the neck with a chaplet of roses, alternately argent and azure. Motto Cavendo tutus (Secure by caution). Orders The Most Noble Order of the Garter - Knight Companion (KG). Other versions The fourth duke arms are sometimes shown with six quarters, and the crest sometimes with a stag (Hardwick).

== Legacy ==
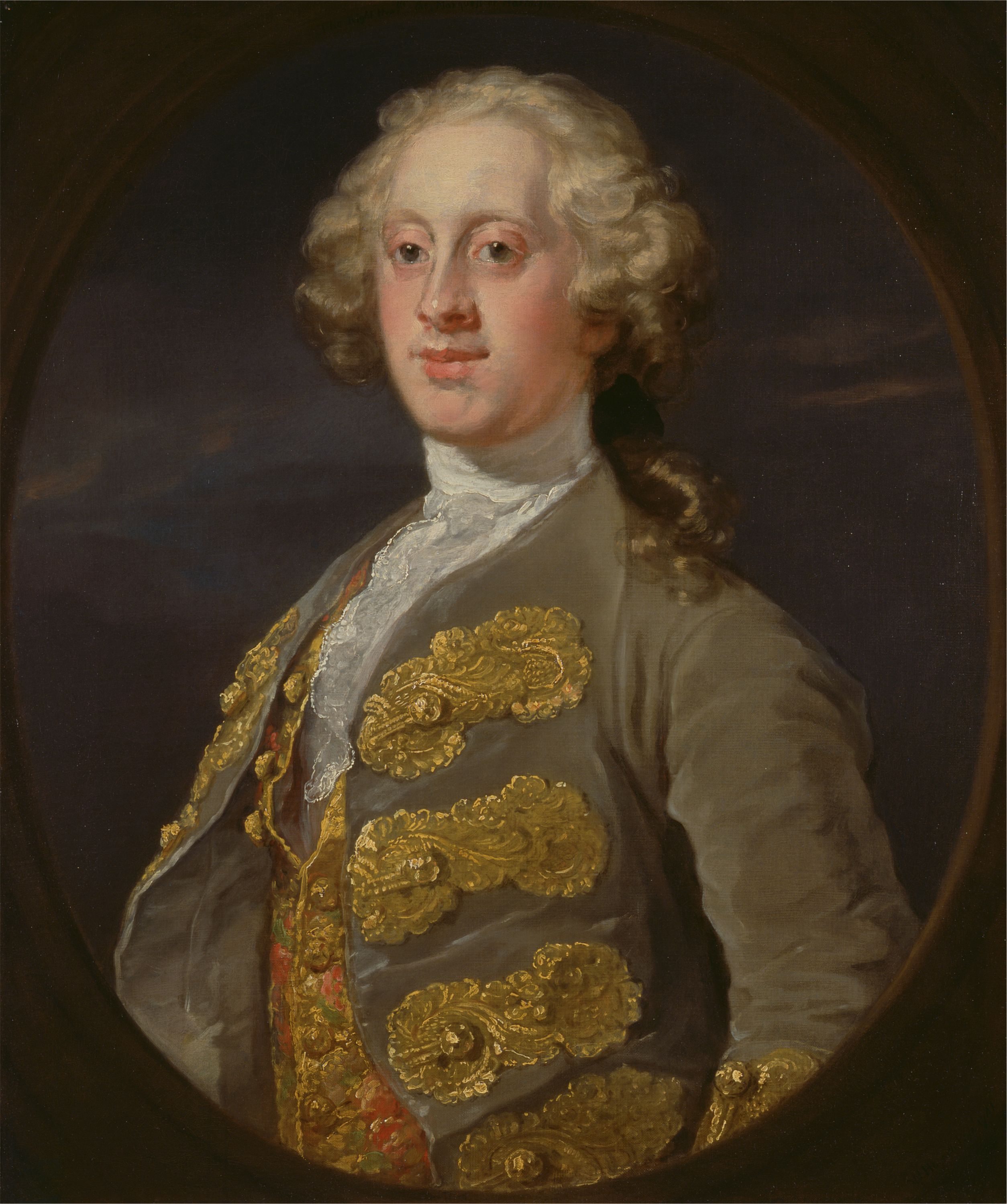
The Duke of Devonshire

Horace Walpole described Devonshire as possessing "an impatience to do everything, and a fear to do anything, he was always in a hurry to do nothing". Paul Langford said Devonshire was "eminently sensible and highly respected", and that his death "left a marked gap in the ranks" of the opposition and "effectively destroyed a generation in the 'Old Whig' leadership". Gerald Howat summed up Devonshire's life:

Devonshire had been a moderate among men of great political passion. If scarcely a spectator in the play of events, he had never bestrode the stage. His death, coming just after those of Hardwicke and Legge, deprived the Whigs of three material men. Given health, he might have returned to office in the Crown's restless pursuit of ministers up to 1770. He had been a man with a concern for king and country. He died the acknowledged leader of the Whigs.

Karl Wolfgang Schweizer says of Devonshire:

Devonshire was a man of solid if not outstanding abilities. He was endowed with the qualities—devotion to friends and duty, patriotism, and unswerving integrity—which made him the ideal sounding board and factotum among the prominent politicians of his day. Unlike Pitt or Fox he lacked a brilliant mind, and his diary provides evidence of devotion to king, country, and duty rather than quickness of intellect. A political broker rather than a leader, he exploited his personal popularity and family prestige to mediate between the factious and egotistical individuals who dominated Dublin and Westminster politics in the 1750s and early 1760s.

== Notes ==
Political offices
Vacant	Master of the Horse; 1751–1755	Succeeded by The Duke of Dorset
Preceded by The Earl of Burlington	Lord High Treasurer of Ireland; 1754–1764	Vacant Title next held by The Duke of Devonshire
Preceded by The Duke of Dorset	Lord Lieutenant of Ireland; 1755–1757	Succeeded by The Duke of Bedford
Preceded by The Duke of Newcastle	Prime Minister of Great Britain; 16 November 1756 – 29 June 1757	Succeeded by The Duke of Newcastle
Preceded by The Duke of Newcastle	Leader of the House of Lords; 1756–1757	Succeeded by The Duke of Newcastle
Preceded by The Duke of Grafton	Lord Chamberlain; 1757–1762	Succeeded by The Duke of Marlborough
Parliament of Great Britain
Preceded by Sir Nathaniel Curzon, Bt; Lord Charles Cavendish	Member of Parliament for Derbyshire; 1741–1751; With: Sir Nathaniel Curzon, Bt	Succeeded by Sir Nathaniel Curzon, Bt; Lord Frederick Cavendish
Honorary titles
Preceded by The Duke of Devonshire	Lord Lieutenant of Derbyshire; 1756–1764	Succeeded by Marquess of Granby
Peerage of England
Preceded by William Cavendish	Duke of Devonshire; 1755–1764	Succeeded by William Cavendish
Preceded by William Cavendish	Baron Cavendish of Hardwick (writ of acceleration); 1751–1764; Member of the House of Lords (1751–1764)	Succeeded by William Cavendish
