= Nathaniel Curzon, 1st Baron Scarsdale =

English Tory politician and peer

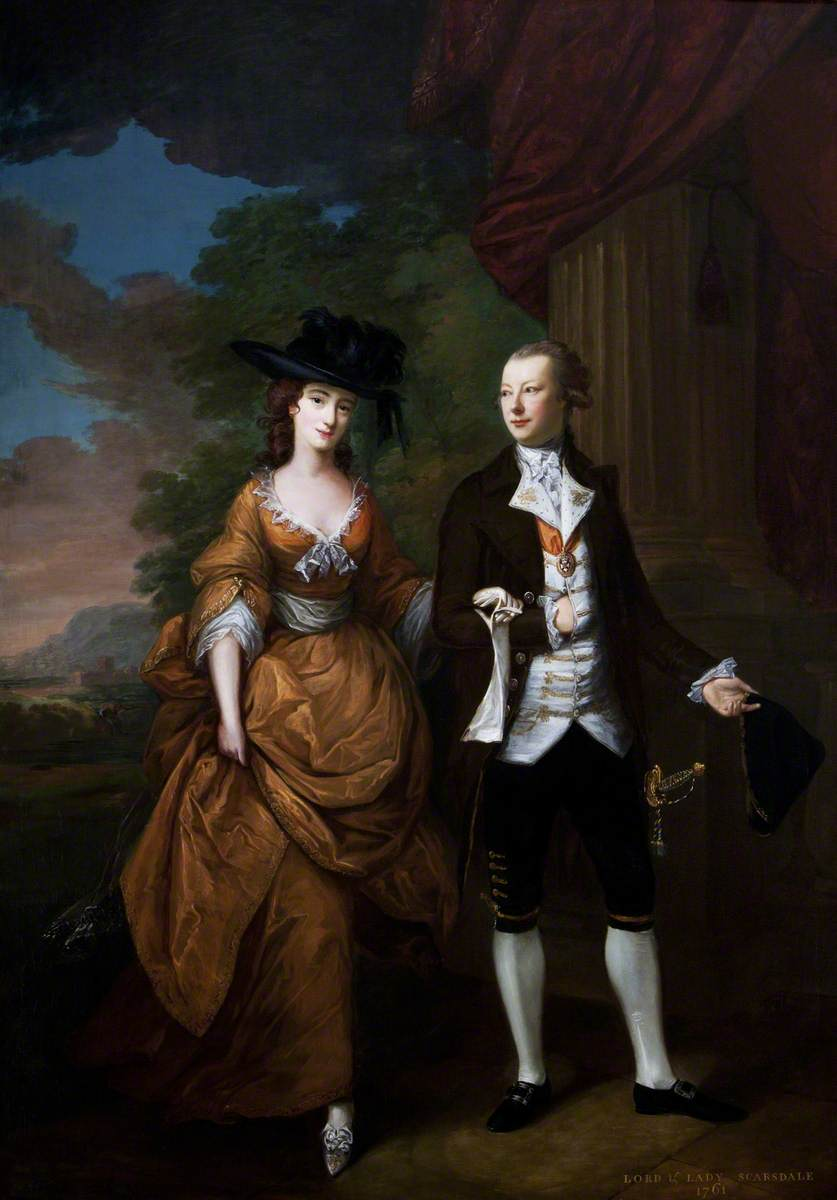
Portrait of Lord Scarsdale and his wife, Lady Caroline, by Nathaniel Hone the Elder, 1761

Nathaniel Curzon, 1st Baron Scarsdale (1726 – 5 December 1804) of Kedleston Hall, Derbyshire was an English Tory politician and peer.

== Early life ==
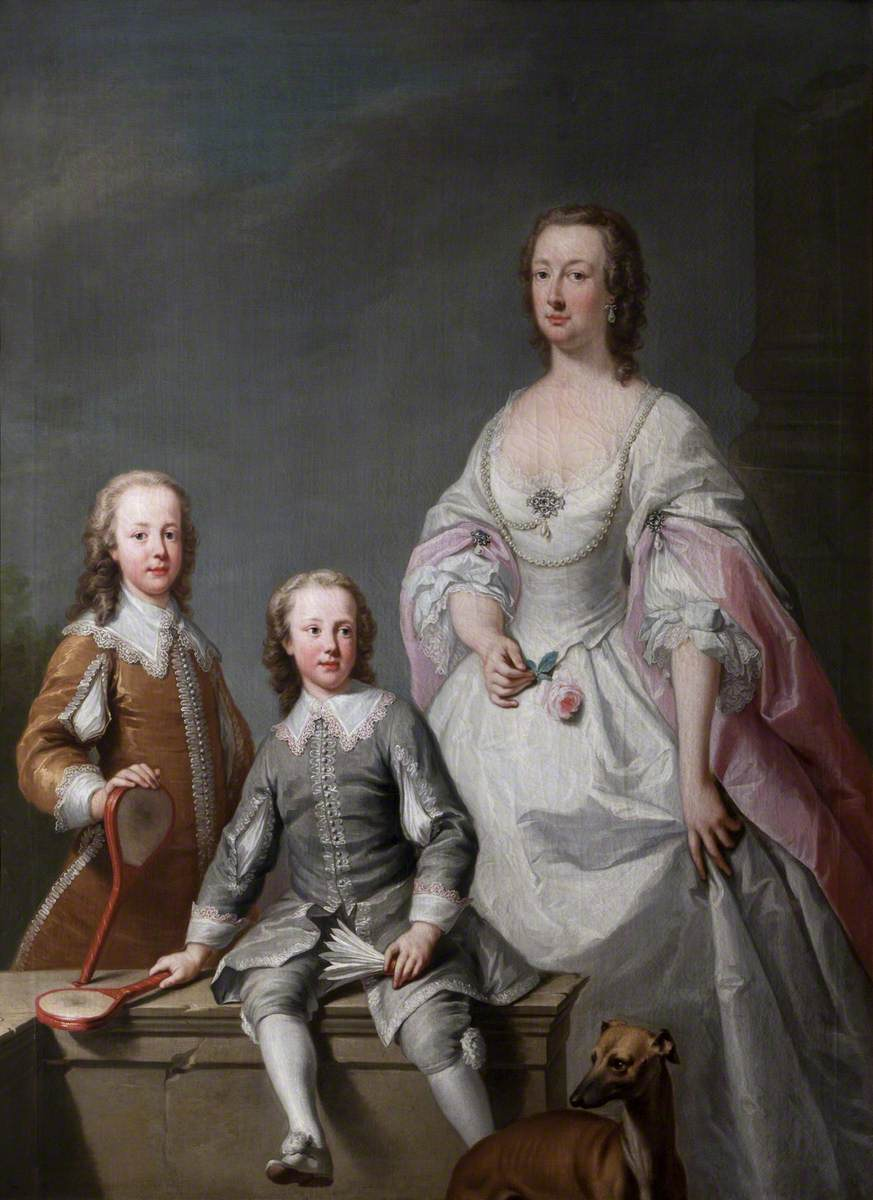
Portrait of Nathaniel and his brother John, with their mother, by Andrea Soldi, between c. 1738–c. 1740.

Curzon was the son of Sir Nathaniel Curzon, 4th Baronet of Kedleston, and his wife Mary Assheton. His younger brother, Assheton Curzon, was made 1st Baron Curzon in 1794 and later 1st Viscount Curzon in 1802. His father served as a Member of Parliament for Derby, Clitheroe, and Derbyshire, which he held until 1754.

His paternal grandparents were Sir Nathaniel Curzon, 2nd Baronet of Kedleston, and his wife Sarah Penn (daughter of William Penn of Penn, Buckinghamshire). When his elder unmarried uncle, Sir John Curzon, 3rd Baronet died in 1727, his father inherited the baronetcy and Kedleston Hall. His maternal grandfather was Sir Ralph Assheton, 2nd Baronet, MP for Lancashire and Liverpool. His aunt, Catherine Assheton, married Thomas Lister, MP for Clitheroe.

== Career ==
Curzon was elected in 1747 as Member of Parliament for Clitheroe, holding the seat until 1754, when he took over his father's seat for Derbyshire. In 1758 he succeeded his father to the baronetcy and Kedleston Hall and in 1761 was created Lord Scarsdale. He later served as Chairman of Committees in the House of Lords.

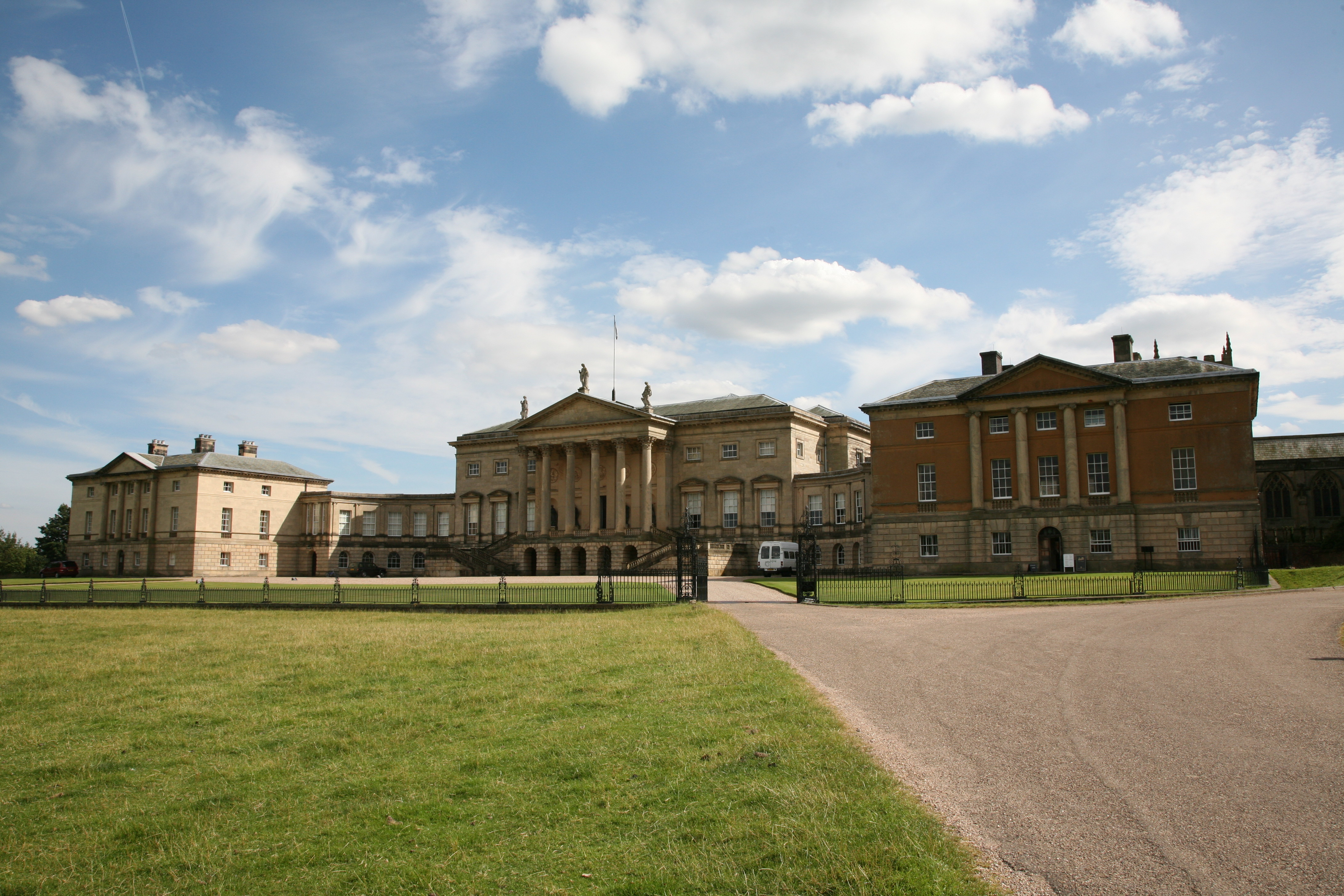
Kedleston Hall

Curzon had started work on the development of Kedleston Hall before he inherited, having employed the landscape gardener William Emes to replace the formal water features with natural lakes. In 1759 he commissioned the rebuilding of the house, designed in the Palladian style by the architects James Paine and Matthew Brettingham. Robert Adam was designing some garden temples to enhance the landscape of the park at the time and Curzon was so impressed with Adam's designs that Adam was quickly put in charge of the construction of the new mansion.

=== Kedleston Hall ===
Curzon intended Kedleston Hall, located 4 miles north-west of Derby, to outshine the house of his Whig neighbour the Cavendishes at Chatsworth. He employed several architects and in December 1758 he met Robert Adam, who he would employ in his reconstruction of Kedleston. Curzon's cabinet-maker of choice was John Linnell. Linnell created the arguably the most magnificent sofas of the Georgian era for the Drawing Room at Kedleston. These sofas have sea nymphs, mermen and mermaids whose tails entwine as their armrests.

The Hall is now open to the public, as one of the properties owned by the National Trust. One wing of Kedleston is still occupied by the Curzon family.

== Personal life ==
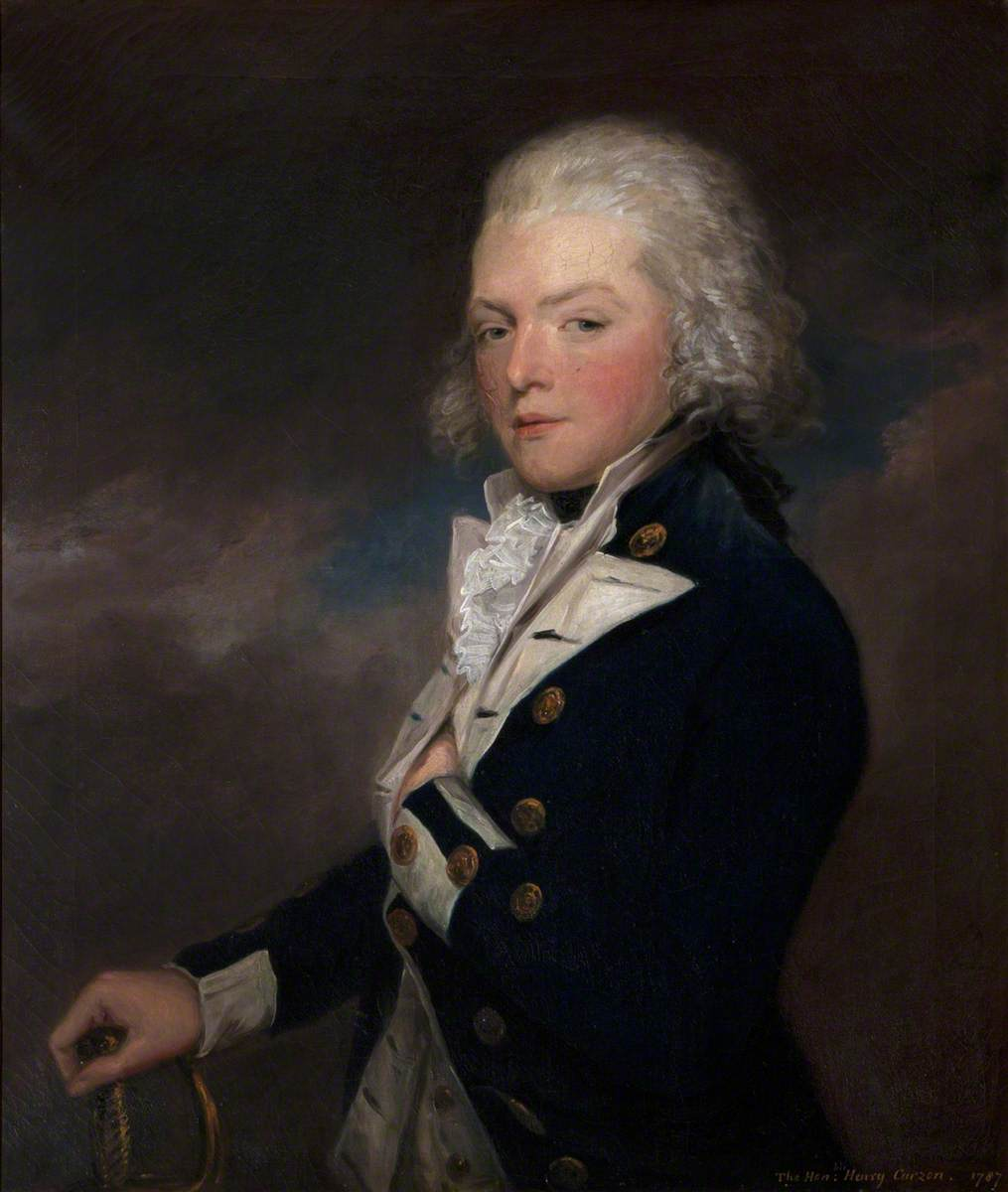
Portrait of his son, Adm. Henry Curzon, by William Hamilton

In 1751, Curzon married Lady Carolina Colyear (c. 1733–1812), the eldest daughter of Charles, Earl of Portmore and Juliana Osborne, Duchess of Leeds (widow of Peregrine Osborne, 3rd Duke of Leeds). Together, they were the parents of five sons and two daughters, including:

- Nathaniel Curzon, 2nd Baron Scarsdale (1752–1837), who married Hon. Sophia-Susanna Noel, daughter of Edward Noel, 1st Viscount Wentworth, in 1777. After her death in 1782, he married Felicite Anne Josephe de Wattines in 1798.
- Hon. Charles William Curzon, an Army officer (1758–1804)
- Hon. John Curzon, a Naval officer (1759–1794)
- Hon. David Francis Curzon (1761–1832), a Reverend.
- Hon. Henry Curzon (1765–1846), an Admiral in the Royal Navy who held commands during the French Revolutionary Wars and the Napoleonic Wars; he died unmarried.
- Hon. Caroline Curzon (d. 1841), who died unmarried.
- Hon. Juliana Curzon (d. 1835), who died unmarried.

Lord Scarsdale died in 1804. He was succeeded by his eldest son, Nathaniel, who became the 2nd Lord Scarsdale.

Parliament of Great Britain
| Preceded by Thomas Lister II; William Curzon | Member of Parliament for Clitheroe; 1747–1754; With: Thomas Lister II | Succeeded by Thomas Lister II; Assheton Curzon |
| Preceded by Lord Frederick Cavendish; Sir Nathaniel Curzon, 4th Bt. | Member of Parliament for Derbyshire; 1754–1761; With: Lord George Augustus Cavendish | Succeeded by Lord George Augustus Cavendish; Sir Henry Harpur, Bt |
Baronetage of England
| Preceded by Nathaniel Curzon | Baronet (of Kedleston); 1758–1804 | Succeeded by Nathaniel Curzon |
Baronetage of Nova Scotia
| Preceded by Nathaniel Curzon | Baronet (of Kedleston); 1758–1804 | Succeeded by Nathaniel Curzon |
Peerage of Great Britain
| New creation | Baron Scarsdale; 1761–1804 | Succeeded by Nathaniel Curzon |
