= Lord Frederick Cavendish (British Army officer) =

British politician and field marshal

Field Marshal Lord Frederick Cavendish
- Born: August 1729
- Died: 21 October 1803 (aged 74); Twickenham Park, Middlesex
- Burial place: Derby Cathedral
- Military career
- Allegiance: United Kingdom
- Branch: British Army
- Service years: 1749–1803
- Rank: Field Marshal
- Commands: Brigade of chasseurs
- Conflicts: Seven Years' War

Field Marshal Lord Frederick Cavendish (August 1729 – 21 October 1803) was a British Army officer and Whig politician. After serving as an aide-de-camp to the Duke of Cumberland in Germany during the early stages of the Seven Years' War, he served under Charles Spencer, 3rd Duke of Marlborough in the raid on St Malo and then took part in the raid on Cherbourg. Cavendish commanded the rear-guard during the re-embarkation following the disastrous battle of Saint Cast and was taken prisoner. After his release, Prince Ferdinand of Brunswick gave him command of a brigade of chasseurs which he led to victory at the Battle of Wilhelmsthal in June 1762.

== Military career ==
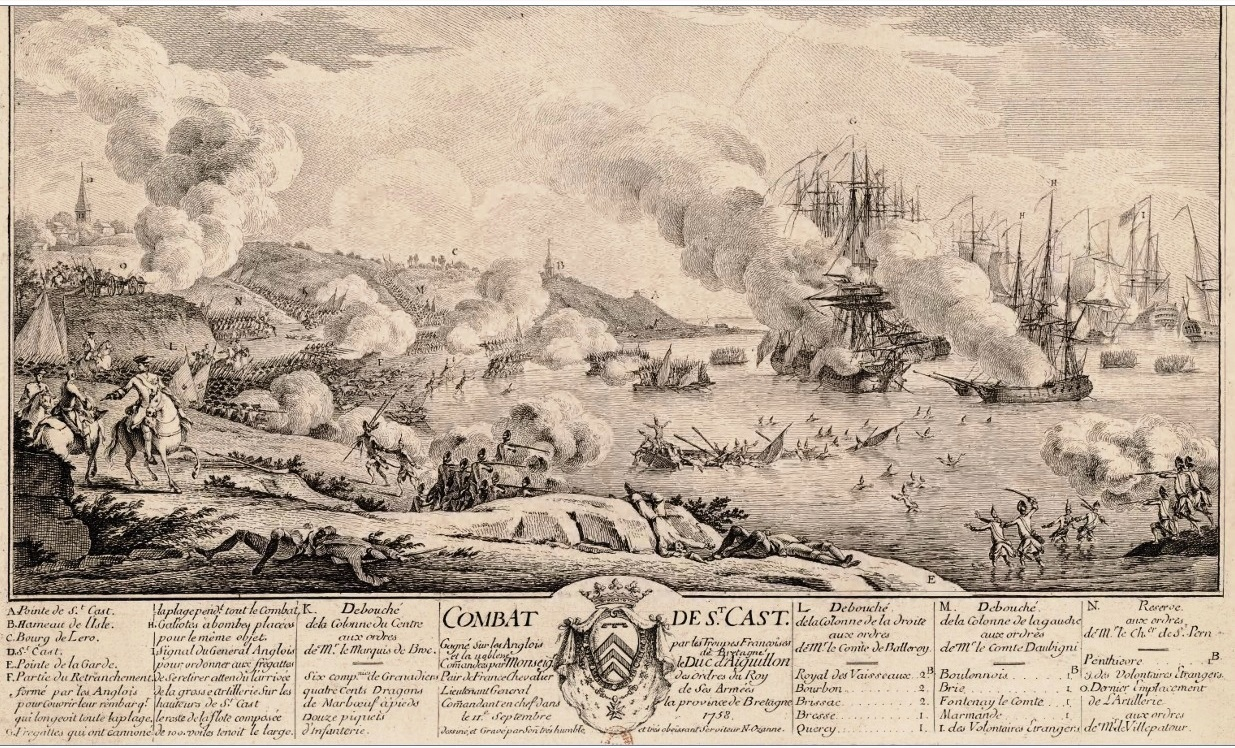
Battle of St Cast during which Lord Frederick Cavendish was taken prisoner

Born the son of William Cavendish, 3rd Duke of Devonshire and Catherine Cavendish (née Hoskins), Cavendish was commissioned as an ensign in the 1st Regiment of Foot Guards on 29 April 1749. He entered politics as Member of Parliament for Derbyshire in 1751. He was promoted to lieutenant in the 2nd Regiment of Foot Guards and captain in the Army on 17 March 1752.

In 1754, Cavendish gave up the Derbyshire seat for his brother George and was returned to Parliament as Member for Derby instead. He was seconded to the 29th Regiment of Foot as lieutenant-colonel and went to Ireland with his brother William Cavendish, Marquess of Hartington, newly made Lord Lieutenant of Ireland, in 1755.

Cavendish was promoted to captain in the 1st Regiment of Foot Guards and lieutenant-colonel in the Army on 1 June 1756 and served as an aide-de-camp to the Duke of Cumberland in Germany in Summer 1757 during the early stages of the Seven Years' War. Promoted to colonel on 7 May 1758 and appointed an aide-de-camp to the King on 9 May 1758, he served under Charles Spencer, 3rd Duke of Marlborough during the raid on St Malo in June 1758 and then took part in the raid on Cherbourg in August 1758. He commanded the rear-guard during the re-embarkation following the disastrous battle of Saint Cast in September 1758 and, having been taken prisoner, gallantly offered to remain in captivity on the basis that he was a Member of Parliament. He was nevertheless released by the Duke of Aiguillon in an exchange for a French officer of equal rank in October 1758.

Cavendish became colonel of the 67th Regiment of Foot in October 1759 and colonel of the 34th Regiment of Foot in October 1760. Promoted to major-general on 7 March 1761, he sailed for Germany where Prince Ferdinand of Brunswick gave him command of a brigade of chasseurs which he led to victory at the Battle of Wilhelmsthal in June 1762. Part of his brigade was ambushed during the Siege of Kassel in October 1762.

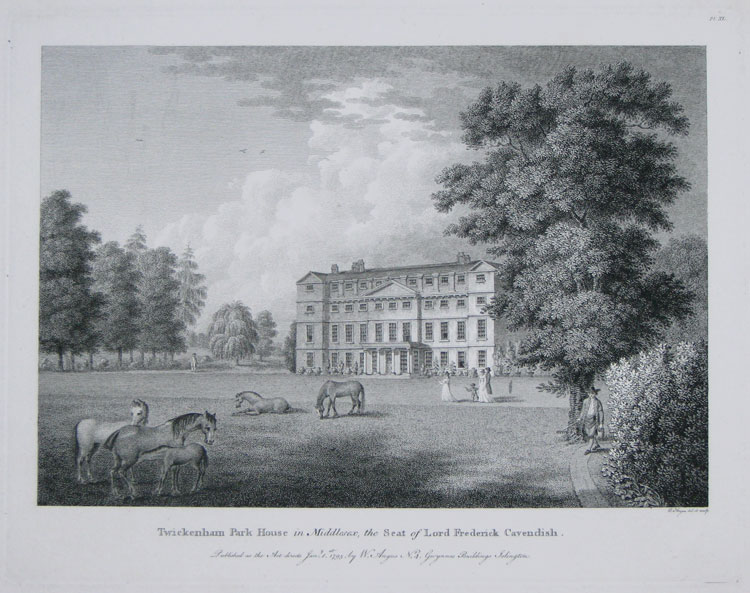
Twickenham Park House

Cavendish was promoted to lieutenant-general on 30 April 1770, but owing to his sympathies, took no part in the American Revolution. In 1780, he retired from Parliament and his seat was taken by his nephew Lord George Cavendish. He was promoted to full general on 20 November 1782 and to field marshal on 30 July 1796.

He died at his home, Twickenham Park, on 21 October 1803 and was buried in the family vault at Derby Cathedral. He left most of his property to his nephew, Lord George Cavendish, later 1st Earl of Burlington.

== Family ==
Cavendish never married and he had no children.

== Sources ==
- Heathcote, Tony (1999). The British Field Marshals, 1736–1997: A Biographical Dictionary. Barnsley: Leo Cooper. ISBN 0-85052-696-5.

Parliament of Great Britain
Preceded by Sir Nathaniel Curzon, 4th Bt; Marquess of Hartington	Member of Parliament for Derbyshire; 1751–1754; With: Sir Nathaniel Curzon, 4th Bt	Succeeded by Lord George Augustus Cavendish; Sir Nathaniel Curzon, 5th Bt
Preceded by Viscount Duncannon; Thomas Rivett	Member of Parliament for Derby; 1754–1780; With: George Venables-Vernon 1754–62; William Fitzherbert 1762–72; Wenman Coke 1772–75; John Gisborne 1775–76; Daniel Parker Coke 1776–1780	Succeeded by Lord George Cavendish; Edward Coke
Military offices
Preceded by James Wolfe	Colonel of the 67th Regiment of Foot; 1759–1760	Succeeded by Sir Henry Erskine, Bt
Preceded by The Earl of Effingham	Colonel of the 34th Regiment of Foot; 1760–1797	Succeeded by The Lord Southampton
