= Sir Nathaniel Curzon, 4th Baronet =

English politician

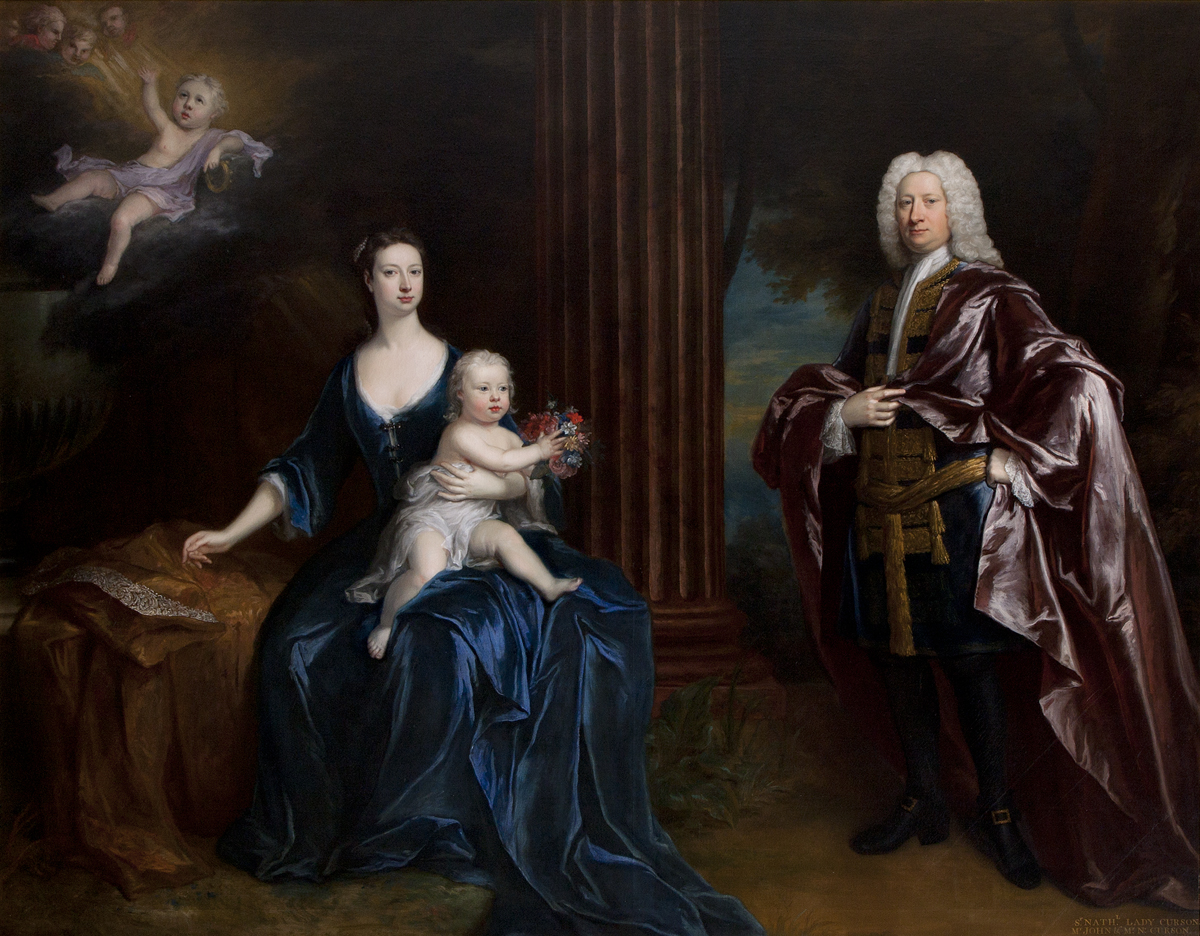
Sir Nathaniel Curzon, 4th Baronet, with his wife Mary Assheton, Lady Curzon, and their sons Nathaniel and John by Jonathan Richardson, 1727–1730.

Sir Nathaniel Curzon, 4th Baronet (1676–1758), of Kedleston Hall, Derbyshire, was an English Tory politician who represented three constituencies in the 18th century.

Curzon was the son of Sir Nathaniel Curzon, 2nd Baronet, of Kedleston, and his wife Sarah Penn, daughter of William Penn of Penn, Buckinghamshire.

Curzon was elected as Member of Parliament for Derby in 1713, but lost the seat in 1715. He was then elected for Clitheroe in 1722. When his elder unmarried brother John died in 1727, he inherited the baronetcy and Kedleston Hall. In the 1727 general election he retained his brother's parliamentary seat for Derbyshire, which he held until 1754.

Curzon married Mary Assheton, daughter of Sir Ralph Assheton, 2nd Baronet, of Middleton, Lancashire. On Curzon's death in 1758, his elder son, Nathaniel, succeeded to the baronetcy and was later made Baron Scarsdale in 1761. His second son, Assheton, was made Baron Curzon in 1794 and later Viscount Curzon in 1802.

Parliament of England
Preceded by Edward Mundy; John Harpur	Member of Parliament for Derby; 1713–1715; With: Edward Mundy	Succeeded by Lord James Cavendish; William Stanhope
Preceded by Thomas Lister I Edward Harvey	Member of Parliament for Clitheroe; 1722–1727; With: Thomas Lister I	Succeeded by Thomas Lister I The Viscount Galway
Preceded by Godfrey Clarke; Sir John Curzon, 3rd Bt	Member of Parliament for Derbyshire; 1727–1754; With: Godfrey Clarke 1727–1734; Lord Charles Cavendish 1734–1741; Marquess of Hartington 1741–1751; Lord Frederick Cavendish 1751–1754	Succeeded by Lord George Cavendish; Sir Nathaniel Curzon, 5th Bt
Baronetage of England
Preceded by John Curzon	Baronet of Kedleston; 1727–1758	Succeeded by Nathaniel Curzon
Baronetage of Nova Scotia
Preceded by John Curzon	Baronet of Kedleston; 1727–1758	Succeeded by Nathaniel Curzon
