= Edmund Hungate Beaghan =

English politician

MP for Winchelsea
- In office 1734–1741

MP for Weymouth and Melcombe Regis
- In office 1747–1754

Personal details
- Born: 13 October 1703
- Died: 15 July 1755 (aged 51)

Edmund Hungate Beaghan (13 October 1703 – 15 July 1755) was an English politician who served as a Member of Parliament.
