= Derbyshire Militia =

Auxiliary unit of the British Army

The Derbyshire Militia (Note: There is no consistency in the sources as to whether the title was the 'Derby' or 'Derbyshire' Militia, both forms being used indiscriminately.) was an auxiliary military force in the county of Derbyshire in the North Midlands of England. From their formal organisation as Trained Bands in 1572 until their final service as the Special Reserve, the Militia regiments of the county carried out internal security and home defence duties in most of Britain's major wars, relieving regular troops from routine garrison duties, and acting as a source of trained officers and men for the Regular Army. The regiments later became battalions of the Sherwood Foresters and finally trained thousands of reinforcements during World War I. After a shadowy postwar existence they were formally disbanded in 1953.

== Early History ==
The English militia was descended from the Anglo-Saxon Fyrd, the military force raised from the freemen of the shires under command of their Sheriff. It continued under the Norman kings, and was reorganised under the Assizes of Arms of 1181 and 1252, and again by King Edward I's Statute of Winchester of 1285. Under this statute 'Commissioners of Array' would levy the required number of men from each shire. The usual shire contingent was 1000 infantry commanded by a millenar, divided into companies of 100 commanded by centenars or ductores, and subdivided into platoons of 20 led by vintenars.

By the end of the 13th Century the men of Sherwood Forest and the Peak District were renowned for their skill in archery (as immortalised in the legends of Robin Hood) and Derby and Nottingham were the only counties not on the Welsh border that sent foot soldiers to all of King Edward I's Welsh Wars. He alsoemployed well-organised men from Derbyshire in his later Scottish campaigns. Similarly, King Edward III levied troops from Derbyshire for service against the Scots in 1327, in 1332, and again in 1333 for his campaign that led to the Siege of Berwick and the Battle of Halidon Hill. For the 1335 campaign the county provided 2 ductores, 15 vintenars, 110 mounted archers and 218 foot archers.

For the Great Muster of the shire forces held by King Henry VIII on 12 April 1539, the commissioners for Derbyshire reported the following:

- High Peak Hundred: archers with horse and 'harness' (armour) 64, archers without 148; billmen with horse and harness 300, billmen without 612
- Derby Town: archers with etc: 10, without 56; billmen with etc: 30, without 126
- Scarsdale Hundred: archers with etc: 64, without 74; billmen with etc: 321, without 684
- Wirksworth Wapentake and Hartington Soke: archers with etc: 38, without 96; billmen with etc: 129, without 361
- Appletree Hundred: archers with etc: 26, without108; billmen with etc: 98, without 255
- Morleston & Litchurch Hundred: archers with etc: 79, without 197; billmen with etc: 61, without 482
- Repton & Gresley Hundred: archers with etc: 28, without 47; billmen with etc: 53, without 154

== Derbyshire Trained Bands ==
The legal basis of the militia was updated by two Acts of 1557 covering musters and the maintenance of horses and armour. The county militia was now under the Lord Lieutenant appointed by the monarch, assisted by the Deputy Lieutenants and Justices of the Peace (JPs). The entry into force of these Acts in 1558 is seen as the starting date for the organised county militia in England. Although the militia obligation was universal, the disorderly force assembled against the Rising of the North confirmed that it was impractical to train and equip every able-bodied man, so after 1572 the practice was to select a proportion of men for the Trained Bands, (TBs). They were trained by professional captains and muster-masters for up to 10 days each year. Full musters were held about every three years when the arms and armour were inspected.

=== Spanish War ===
The threat of invasion during the Spanish War led to an increase in training. At first the government emphasised the 17 'maritime' counties most vulnerable to attack, and it was not until 1586 that inland counties were placed under lords-lieutenant, ordered to appoint captains and muster-masters and to intensify training. The TBs were placed on alert in April 1588 and brought to an hour's notice in June. When warning of the invasion Armada arrived the TBs were mobilised on 23 July. Derbyshire mustered 600 out of its 1600 able men, of whom 400 were trained and 200 untrained, in addition to 100 men who had been sent to Ireland. There were also 18 lancers, 50 light horse and 12 'petronels' (an early form of cavalry firearm).

In the 16th Century little distinction was made between the militia and the troops levied by the counties for overseas expeditions, and between 1585 and 1601 Derbyshire supplied 773 levies for service in Ireland and 75 for the Netherlands. However, the counties usually conscripted the unemployed and criminals rather than the Trained Bandsmen – in 1585 the Privy Council had ordered the impressment of able-bodied unemployed men, and the Queen ordered 'none of her trayned-bands to be pressed'. Replacing the weapons issued to the levies from the militia armouries was a heavy burden on the counties.

With the passing of the threat of invasion, the trained bands declined in the early 17th Century. Later, King Charles I attempted to reform them into a national force or 'Perfect Militia' answering to the king rather than local control. When they were mustered and inspected in 1638 the Derbyshire Trained Bands consisted of 400 foot (239 musketeers and 161 'corslet's (body armour, signifying pikemen). They also mustered 33 cuirassiers and 41 dragoons.

=== Civil Wars ===
In 1639 and 1640 Charles attempted to employ the TBs for the Bishops' Wars in Scotland. However, many of those sent on this unpopular service in 1639 were untrained replacements and conscripts – Derbyshire sent 200 conscripts, mainly labourers – and many officers were corrupt or inefficient. For the Second Bishops' War of 1640 Derbyshire was ordered to have 400 men at the general rendezvous on 25 May to march to Grimsby on 5 June, from where they would go by ship on 10 June to Newcastle-upon-Tyne. Once again, it seems that many of the trained bandsmen nationwide escaped service and raw substitutes were sent in their place. Across the country the ill-disciplined troops caused disorders: West Country conscripts marching through Derbyshire were incited to tear down unpopular enclosure fences and break prisoners out of Derby Gaol. The Scottish campaign ended in failure.

Control of the TBs was one of the major points of dispute between Charles I and Parliament that led to the First English Civil War. When open warfare broke out in 1642 neither side made much use of the TBs beyond securing the county armouries for their own full-time troops who would serve anywhere in the country, many of whom were former trained bandsmen. In August 1642 the king ordered the seizure of the Derbyshire TBs' weapons for his new field army. It is possible that Derbyshire TB foot served in Sir John Meldrum's Parliamentarian army that was defeated at the Relief of Newark in March 1644.

As Parliament tightened its grip on the country after the Second English Civil War, it passed new Militia Acts in 1648 and 1650 that replaced lords lieutenant with county commissioners appointed by Parliament or the Council of State. From now on, the term 'Trained Band' began to disappear in most counties. In March 1650 Major Nathaniel Barton, an experienced officer of the New Model Army, was commissioned as colonel of the Derbyshire Militia horse and foot. However, the Derbyshire Militia do not appear to have been called out during the Scots invasion of 1651 and Col Barton served as a major again in a regular regiment of horse during campaign. Under the Commonwealth and Protectorate, the militia received pay when called out, and operated alongside the New Model Army to control the country.

== Restoration Militia ==
After the Restoration the English Militia was re-established by the Militia Act 1661 under the control of the king's lords lieutenants, the men to be selected by ballot. This was popularly seen as the 'Constitutional Force' to counterbalance a 'Standing Army' tainted by association with the New Model Army that had supported Cromwell's military dictatorship, and almost the whole burden of home defence and internal security was entrusted to the militia. Their early duties included seizing arms from dissidents, suppressing non-conformist religious assemblies and mounting standing guards whereby one-twentieth of the men at a time did 14 days' continuous duty. However, Derbyshire as a small county was given permission in January 1665 to cease maintaining guards. The militia were called out when invasion threatened during the Anglo–Dutch wars, but later musters became less and less frequent.

King James II came to the throne in 1685 and the militia were embodied during the Monmouth Rebellion later that year, though unlike the West Country militia who confronted the rebels, most regiments merely kept order and arrested suspects in their own county. However, after Monmouth's defeat at the Battle of Sedgemoor James downgraded the militia in favour of building up his standing army. The militia played almost no part when Prince William of Orange landed in the West Country in November 1688. The Lord Lieutenant, the Earl of Huntingdon, was absent from the county, commanding his Regular Army regiment at Plymouth, where he was arrested when the Governor declared for William. Although the Derbyshire Militia was embodied from October to March 1689 it seems to have done no more than keep the peace and it acquiesced in the Glorious Revolution that overthrew James in favour of William and Mary. The Earl of Huntingdon was replaced by the Earl, later 1st Duke of Devonshire, a leader of the revolution.

The militia continued in William's reign. In 1697 when all the counties were ordered to provide returns of the strength and efficiency of their militia, Derbyshire reported 2 Troops of horse totalling 140 men and 4 companies of foot, 524 men, all under the Duke of Devonshire as Lord Lieutenant. However, the report went on to say that no survey of the ratepayers had been made for 30 years and many estates had changed hands, leading to confusion over whether a particular landowner was to support a footsoldier or a horseman, with consequent disorganisation of the troops and companies.

=== Jacobite Risings ===
The militia mustered for annual training until the Treaty of Utrecht and the accession of King George I. It was of little use against the Jacobite rising of 1715, and fell into virtual abeyance across the whole country in the following years.

When Prince Charles Edward Stuart's army invaded England during the Jacobite Rising of 1745, some counties endeavoured to raise their official militia under a new Militia Act 1745, while others found it more practical to raise volunteer forces; 15 leading noblemen offered to raise regiments at their own expense. In Derbyshire the Lord Lieutenant, the 3rd Duke of Devonshire, organised a subscription to raise a hybrid force known as the Derbyshire Blues. However, when the large Jacobite army approached his headquarters at Derby these volunteers fell back until the Jacobites withdrew to Scotland.

== 1757 Reforms ==
Under threat of French invasion during the Seven Years' War a series of Militia Acts from 1757 reorganised the county militia regiments, the men being conscripted by means of parish ballots (paid substitutes were permitted) to serve for three years. In peacetime they assembled for 28 days' annual training, but could be embodied for permanent service in wartime. There was a property qualification for officers, who were commissioned by the lord lieutenant. An adjutant and drill sergeants were to be provided to each regiment from the Regular Army, and arms and accoutrements would be supplied when the county had secured 60 per cent of its quota of recruits.

Derbyshire was given a quota of 560 men to raise in one regiment, but conscription by ballot was deeply unpopular in the Midland country districts and the necessity did not seem so urgent for inland counties like Derbyshire, far from any potential invasion. The county gentry were generally apathetic, many preferring to pay a large fine instead of raising their regiments. Even at the end of the war Derbyshire had still not complied, and was one of six defaulter counties, remaining so for many years. It was not until 4 September 1773 that the authorisation to issue arms to the regiment was finally given and it began annual training.

=== American War of Independence ===
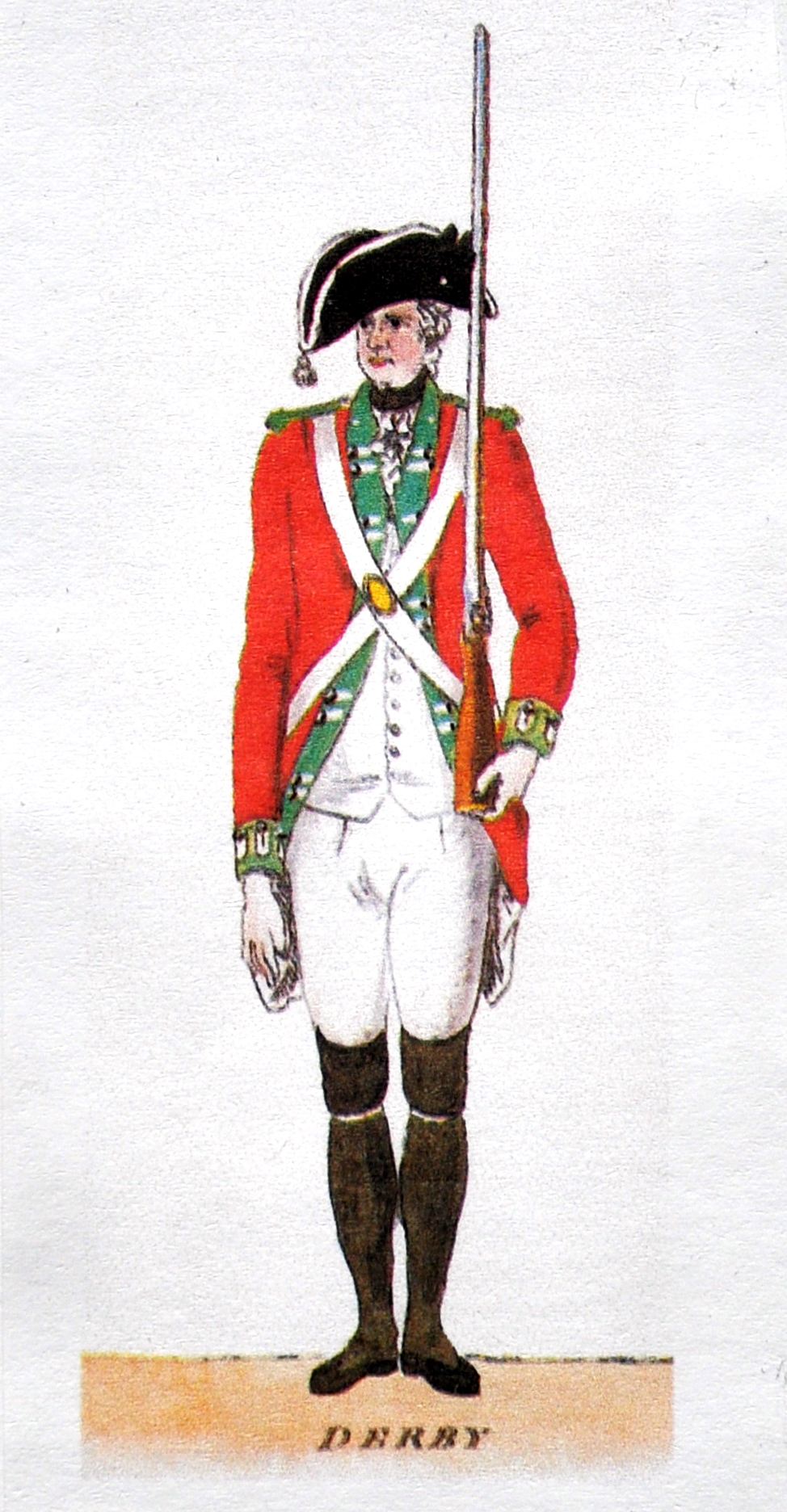
The uniform of the Derbyshire Militia in 1780.

The militia was embodied on 31 March 1778 during the War of American Independence when the country was threatened with invasion by the Americans' allies, France and Spain. It became common to assemble the militia in summer training camps alongside Regular forces. During the summer of 1778 the Derbyshire Militia commanded by the 5th Duke of Devonshire was at Coxheath Camp near Maidstone in Kent, while in the summer of 1781 the regiment formed part of the Plymouth garrison.

The Peace of Paris having been negotiated, the militia were sent to their home counties for disembodiment in March 1783. From 1784 to 1792 the militia was kept up to strength by the ballot and was supposed to assemble for 28 days' training annually, even though to save money only two-thirds of the men were actually called out each year.

=== French Wars ===
The militia had already been embodied in December 1792 before Revolutionary France declared war on Britain on 1 February 1793. During the French wars, the militia were on service for a whole generation, and became regiments of full-time professional soldiers (though restricted to service in the British Isles), which the regular army increasingly saw as a prime source of recruits. They served in coast defences, manned garrisons, guarded prisoners of war, and carried out internal security duties, while their traditional local defence role was taken over by the Volunteers and mounted Yeomanry.

=== Supplementary Militia ===
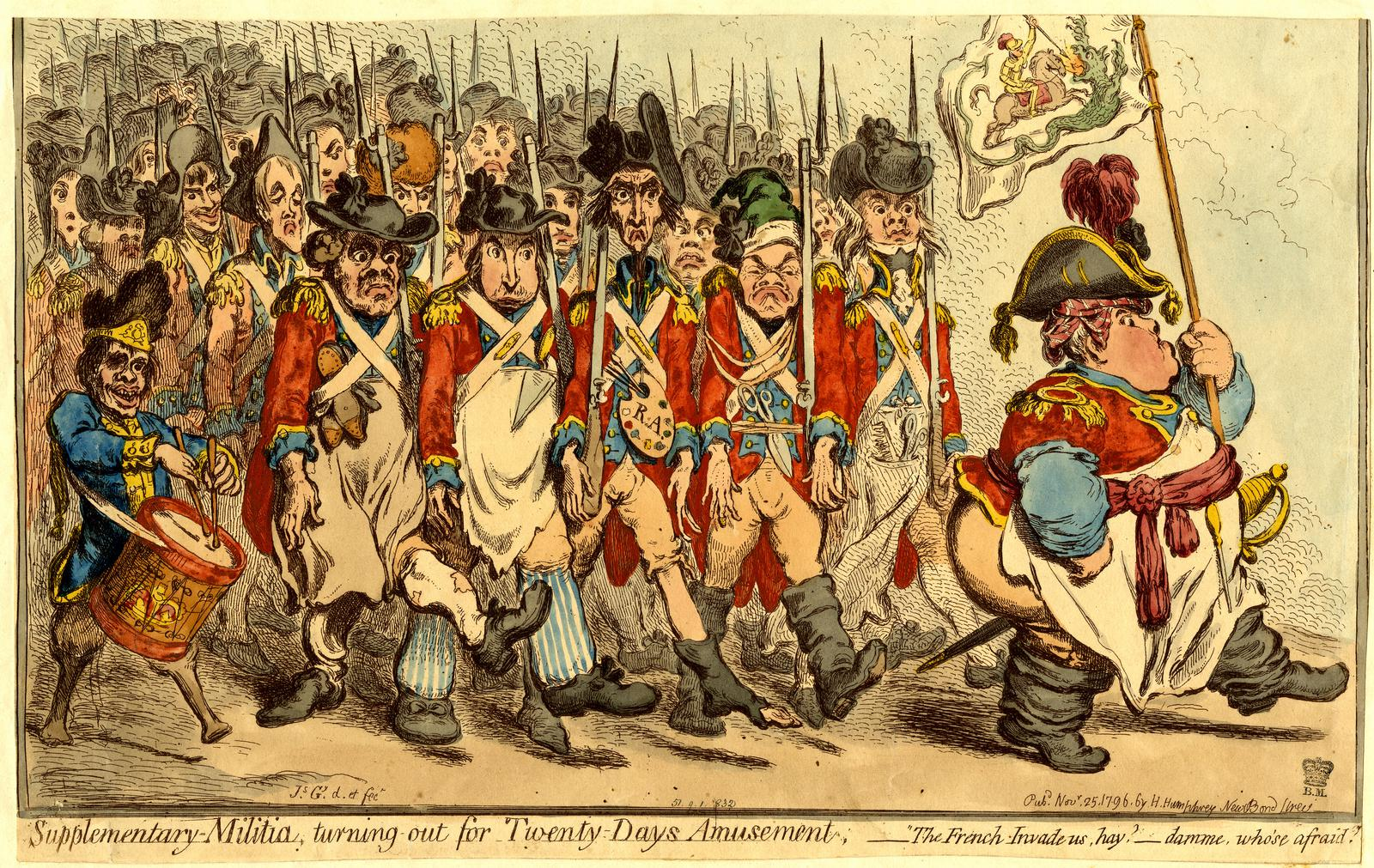
Supplementary-Militia, turning-out for Twenty Days Amusement: 1796 caricature by James Gillray.

In an attempt to have as many men as possible under arms for home defence to release Regulars for overseas service, the government created the Supplementary Militia in 1796, a compulsory levy of men to be trained in their spare time, and to be incorporated to the militia in emergency. Derbyshire's additional quota was fixed at 1106 men. The lieutenancies were required to carry out 20 days' initial training as soon as possible, and the existing militia regiments sent training detachments back to their home counties to carry this out. The Supplementaries were called out in 1798 and the Derbyshire lieutenancy chose to form theirs into a complete regiment, the Derbyshire Supplementary Militia, under the command of Lt-Col Francis Mundy. The Supplementary Militia was stood down in 1800, though the disembodied men were encouraged to transfer to the Regular Army.

The Treaty of Amiens was signed in March 1802 and the militia were disembodied. Derbyshire's militia quota was reduced to 939.

=== Napoleonic Wars ===
The Peace of Amiens proved short-lived, and the militia was embodied once more when hostilities broke out in 1803. The Derbyshire regiment was briefly numbered as 1st Derbyshire when the supplementaries were re-embodied as the 2nd Derbyshire (of five companies) from 1803 to 1806. Francis Mundy continued as Lt-Col of the 2nd Regiment, under the command of his older kinsman Edward Miller Mundy, MP, as colonel; Francis's younger brother Charles Godfrey Mundy served as major.

=== Derbyshire Local Militia ===
While the Regular Militia were the mainstay of national defence during the Napoleonic Wars, they were supplemented from 1808 by the Local Militia, which were part-time and only to be used within their own districts. These were raised to counter the declining numbers of Volunteers, and if their ranks could not be filled voluntarily the militia ballot was employed. They were to be trained once a year. Five regiments of Derbyshire Local Militia were formed, and all the officers commissioned as Lt-Col commandants on 24 September 1808 had held the same rank in one of the larger Volunteer corps of 1803. It can be assumed that many of their men also transferred to the new force, as well as absorbing many of the company-sized Volunteer units. The new units were:

- Belper Local Militia at Belper under Lt-Col Cmndt Joseph Strutt, formerly of the Belper, Shottle and Holbrook Volunteers
- Chatsworth Local Militia at Buxton under Lt-Col Cmndt Henry Bache Thornhill, formerly of the Chatsworth Volunteers
- Derby Local Militia at Derby under Col the Rev Edward Poole, formerly Lt-Col Cmndt of the Derby Volunteers
- Scarsdale Local Militia at Chesterfield under Lt-Col Cmndt Joshua Jebb, formerly of the Chesterfield Volunteers
- Wirksworth Local Militia at Wirksworth under Lt-Col Cmndt Charles Hurt, formerly of the Wirksworth and Matlock Volunteers

=== Ireland and France ===
Meanwhile, the regular militia served more widely. In 1811 an Interchange Act allowed English Militia units to volunteer to interchange with Irish Militia regiments for two years. It appears that the government was happy to send Midlands militia regiments to Ireland in case they developed sympathies with the Luddites, who had begun their machine-breaking in Nottingham. The Derbyshire Militia volunteered and served in Ireland in 1813–14.

In November 1813 the militia were invited to volunteer for limited overseas service, primarily for garrison duties in Europe. A 125-strong detachment of the Derbyshire militia volunteered and were assigned to the 3rd Provisional Battalion. The battalion sailed from Portsmouth in March 1814 and landed at Bordeaux soon after it had been occupied by the Duke of Wellington's forces. It did not take part in the Battle of Toulouse, but carried out garrison and occupation duties as the war was ending.

After Napoleon's abdication the Derbyshire Militia remained in service, guarding Dartmoor Prison, which still housed American prisoners from the continuing War of 1812. Early in 1815 it helped to put down a violent riot. Napoleon's escape from Elba led to the Hundred Days' campaign culminating in the Battle of Waterloo. After Waterloo the disembodiment of the militia could be resumed, and all remaining units had been stood down before the and of 1816.

== 1852 Reforms ==
After Waterloo there was a long peace. Although officers continued to be commissioned into the militia and ballots were still held, the regiments were rarely assembled for training and the permanent staffs of sergeants and drummers were progressively reduced. The Militia of the United Kingdom was revived by the Militia Act 1852, enacted during a renewed period of international tension. As before, units were recruited and administered on a county basis, and filled by voluntary enlistment (although conscription by means of the Militia Ballot could be used if the counties failed to meet their quotas). Training was for 56 days on enlistment, then for 21–28 days per year, during which the men received full army pay. The Militia was transferred from the Home Office to the War Office (WO). Under the Act, militia units could be embodied by Royal Proclamation for full-time home defence service in three circumstances:

1. 'Whenever a state of war exists between Her Majesty and any foreign power'.
2. 'In all cases of invasion or upon imminent danger thereof'.
3. 'In all cases of rebellion or insurrection'.

=== 1st & 2nd Derbyshire Militia ===
The Derbyshire Militia was revived in 1852, and was called out for home defence during the Crimean War. The 2nd Derbyshire Militia (Chatsworth Rifles) was formed at Chesterfield in January 1855, and the original regiment became the 1st Derbyshire Militia once more.

Thereafter the militia regularly carried out their peacetime annual training. The Militia Reserve introduced in 1867 consisted of present and former militiamen who undertook to serve overseas in case of war.

== Cardwell and Childers reforms ==
Under the 'Localisation of the Forces' scheme introduced by the Cardwell Reforms in 1872, Regular infantry battalions were linked together and assigned to particular counties or localities, while the county Militia and Volunteers were affiliated to them in a 'sub-district' with a shared depot. Sub-District No 26 (County of Derby) comprised:

- 54th (West Norfolk) Regiment of Foot
- 95th (Derbyshire) Regiment of Foot
- 2nd Derbyshire Militia (Chatsworth Rifles) at Chesterfield
- 1st Derbyshire Militia at Derby
- 1st Administrative Battalion, Derbyshire Rifle Volunteer Corps at Derby
- 2nd Administrative Battalion, Derbyshire Rifle Volunteer Corps at Bakewell

The 1881 Childers Reforms took Cardwell's scheme a stage further, the linked regular regiments combining into single two-battalion regiments. However, the 95th Foot was now linked with the 45th (Nottinghamshire) (Sherwood Foresters) Regiment of Foot to form a combined Sherwood Foresters (Derbyshire Regiment). The attached militia now became battalions of the regiment:

- 1st Battalion (ex-45th Foot)
- 2nd Battalion (ex-95th Foot)
- 3rd (2nd Derbyshire Militia) Battalion (Chatsworth Rifles) moved from Chesterfield to Derby
- 4th (Royal Sherwood Foresters Militia) Battalion at Newark-on-Trent
- 5th (1st Derbyshire Militia) Battalion at Derby
- 45th Regimental Depot at Normanton Barracks outside Derby
- 1st & 2nd Derbyshire Volunteer Battalions
- 1st & 2nd Nottinghamshire Volunteer Battalions

=== 3rd Battalion, Sherwood Foresters ===
The 3rd and 5th Battalions merged in 1891 as the 3rd Battalion, Sherwood Foresters. The battalion was embodied for home defence during the Second Boer War. Under the sweeping Haldane Reforms of 1908, the Militia was replaced by the Special Reserve (SR), a semi-professional force whose role was to provide reinforcement drafts for regular units serving overseas in wartime, rather like the earlier Militia Reserve. The Derby battalion became the 3rd (Reserve) Battalion, Sherwood Foresters, on 26 July 1908; the Nottinghamshire battalion became the 4th (Extra Reserve) Bn.

When World War I broke out the 3rd (R) Bn was embodied and went to its war station at Plymouth; later joining the 4th (ER) Bn at Sunderland. The two Foresters battalions remained there for the rest of the war in the Tyne Garrison. There they carried out their twin roles of manning part of the East Coast defences and preparing Army Reservists, Special Reservists, and later new recruits as reinforcement drafts for the Regular battalions serving on the Western Front. The 3rd (R) Bn also formed the 13th (R) Bn, which later joined the Training Reserve, and ended the war as a training battalion of the Leicestershire Regiment.

The disembodied SR resumed its old title of Militia in 1921 but like most militia units the 3rd Sherwood Foresters remained in abeyance after World War I. The Militia was formally disbanded in April 1953.

== Heritage & Ceremonial ==
=== Precedence ===
At the time of the Seven Years' War, county militia regiments determined their respective precedence by drawing lots. During the War of American Independence the counties were given an order of precedence determined by ballot each year. For Derbyshire the positions were:

- 14th on 1 June 1778
- 22nd on 12 May 1779
- 19th on 6 May 1780
- 38th on 28 April 1781
- 27th on 7 May 1782

The militia order of precedence balloted for in 1793 (Derbyshire was 26th) remained in force throughout the French Revolutionary War. Another ballot took place in 1803 at the start of the Napoleonic War, when Buckinghamshire was 67th.

In 1833 the system was regularised, the king drawing the numbers for individual regiments. The first 47 places went to regiments raised before 1763, the next 22 were for those raised between 1763 and 1783. The (1st) Derbyshire regiment received 62nd place. In 1855 the list was revised to account for the new regiments, and the 2nd Derbyshire received the number 34, which had been vacated by the conversion of the East Suffolk Militia to artillery. This explains why the 2nd Derbys were listed ahead of the 1st Derbys under the Cardwell system, and became the 3rd Bn of the Sherwood Foresters ahead of the 4th (Nottinghamshire Militia) Bn (ranked 59th) and the 5th (1st Derby Militia) Bn (ranked 62nd), and ultimately why the 3rd Bn continued while the 5th was disbanded.

=== Uniforms & Insignia ===
The uniform of the Derbyshire Militia in 1780–81 was red with mid-green facings; the facings changed to yellow by 1800. By 1803 the officers' buttons and belt plates carried the badge associated with Derbyshire of a rose on an escutcheon surmounted by a crown, with DERBYSHIRE beneath. The Supplementary/2nd Derbyshire regiment of 1798–9 and 1803–06 wore the same uniforms and insignia as the regular militia regiment.

All but one of the 1803 Volunteer units in Derbyshire had adhered to the basic uniform of the county's militia, and the Local Militia uniforms from 1808 were expected to be identical to the Regular Militia. However, the buttons varied between the regiments:

- The Belper unit had the crowned rose escutcheon with either 'BELPER REGIMENT' above and 'DERBYSHIRE' below, or 'BELPER' above and "LOCAL MILITIA' below. The remains of the yellow Regimental colour are preserved in St Peter's Church, Belper.
- The Derby unit had the crowned escutcheon with 'DERBY' above and 'LOCAL MILITIA' below
- The Chatsworth unit had a crowned rose surrounded by 'CHATSWORTH * LM * DERBYSHIRE'. The Chatsworth Volunteers had borne the Duke of Devonshire's coat of arms on their brass shako plates, and this may have been carried over to the Chatsworth LM.
- Similarly the Scarsdale unit had a crowned rose with 'SCARSDALE * LM * DERBYSHIRE'
- The Wirksworth unit also had a crowned rose with 'WIRKSWORTH * LM * DERBYSHIRE'; this was also on the officers' belt plates.

As a rifle corps, the 2nd Derbyshire Militia (Chatsworth Rifles) wore a Rifle green uniform with black facings in imitation of the Rifle Brigade instead of the red coats and yellow facings of the 1st Derbys.

After 1881 the two Derbyshire Militia battalions adopted the red tunics and white facings of the Sherwood Foresters, together with its cap badge and other insignia. However, the Foresters incorporated the Derbyshire rose and escutcheon into their full dress helmet plate.

== See also ==
- Trained bands
- Militia (England)
- Militia (Great Britain)
- Militia (United Kingdom)
- Derbyshire Blues
- 1st Derbyshire Militia
- 2nd Derbyshire Militia (Chatsworth Rifles)
- Sherwood Foresters
