= 1st Derbyshire Militia =

Auxiliary unit of the British Army

1st Derbyshire Militia 5th (1st Derby Militia) Bn Sherwood Foresters
- Active: 4 September 1773–1 April 1891
- Country: United Kingdom
- Branch: Militia
- Role: Infantry
- Size: 1 Battalion
- Part of: Sherwood Foresters
- Garrison/HQ: Derby

The Derbyshire Militia, later the 1st Derbyshire Militia (Note: There is no consistency in the sources as to whether the title was the 'Derby' or 'Derbyshire' Militia, both forms being used indiscriminately.) was an auxiliary regiment from the county of Derbyshire in the North Midlands of England. Reformed from earlier precursors in 1773, it carried out internal security and home defence duties in most of Britain's major wars, relieving regular troops from routine garrison duties, and acting as a source of trained officers and men for the Regular Army. It later became a battalion of the Sherwood Foresters, but was disbanded and merged into another battalion in 1891.

== Background ==
The universal obligation to military service in the Shire levy was long established in England and its legal basis was updated by two acts of 1557 (4 & 5 Ph. & M. cc. 2 and 3). They were placed under the command of county Lords Lieutenant appointed by the monarch. This is seen as the starting date for the organised county militia in England. From 1572 the practice was only to call out and train a certain number of selected men, the 'Trained Bands'. These were an important element in the country's defence at the time of the Spanish Armada. Control of the militia was one of the areas of dispute between King Charles I and Parliament that led to the English Civil War. The English Militia was re-established under local control in 1662 after the Restoration of the monarchy. However, between periods of national emergency the militia was regularly allowed to decline.

During the Jacobite Rising of 1745 an ad hoc militia regiment, the 'Derbyshire Blues' was raised at Derby by public subscription, but it was forced to evacuate the town when Prince Charles Edward Stuart's much larger army arrived and made the town its headquarters. The Derbyshire Blues disappeared as soon as the danger had passed.

== 1757 Reforms ==
Under threat of French invasion during the Seven Years' War a series of Militia Acts from 1757 reorganised the county militia regiments, the men being conscripted by means of parish ballots (paid substitutes were permitted) to serve for three years. In peacetime they assembled for 28 days' annual training, but could be embodied for permanent service in wartime. There was a property qualification for officers, who were commissioned by the lord lieutenant. An adjutant and drill sergeants were to be provided to each regiment from the Regular Army, and arms and accoutrements would be supplied when the county had secured 60 per cent of its quota of recruits.

Derbyshire was given a quota of 560 men to raise in one regiment, but conscription by ballot was deeply unpopular in the Midland country districts and the necessity did not seem so urgent for inland counties like Derbyshire, far from any potential invasion. The county gentry were generally apathetic, many preferring to pay a large fine instead of raising their regiments. So few qualified gentlemen came forward in Derbyshire that the Lord Lieutenant was reduced to placing newspaper advertisements, without effect. Even at the end of the war Derbyshire had still not complied, and was one of six defaulter counties, remaining so for many years. The Lord Lieutenant, Lord George Cavendish, was titular colonel of a regiment that did not exist. More progress was made after the Militia Act 1769 was passed, but it was not until 4 September 1773 that the authorisation to issue arms to the regiment was finally given and it began its first annual training on 10 May 1775, still short of its complement of junior officers. When the original recruits completed their three years' service, the regiment had to appeal to them to sign on again, or for paid substitutes to offer themselves.

=== American Revolutionary War ===
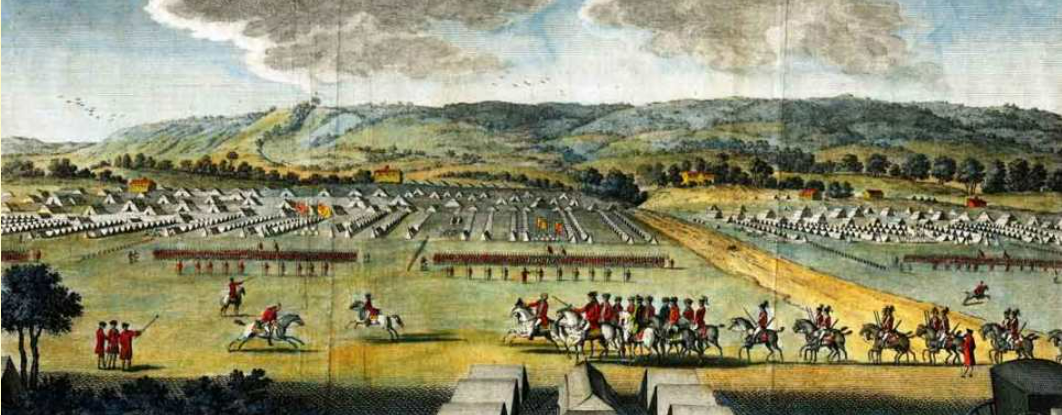
Coxheath Camp in 1778.

The militia was called out on 31 March 1778 during the War of American Independence when the country was threatened with invasion by the Americans' allies, France and Spain. However, the Derbyshire regiment was late assembling. Lord George Cavendish appointed his nephew, the 5th Duke of Devonshire as colonel in April, and in May the new commanding officer had to deal with a mutiny by the assembled men over pay for their annual training. Seven ringleaders who had demanded money from their officers at bayonet point were court-martialled in July after the regiment arrived at Coxheath Camp near Maidstone in Kent. Coxheath was the army's largest training camp, where the completely raw Militia were exercised as part of a division alongside Regular troops while providing a reserve in case of French invasion of South East England.

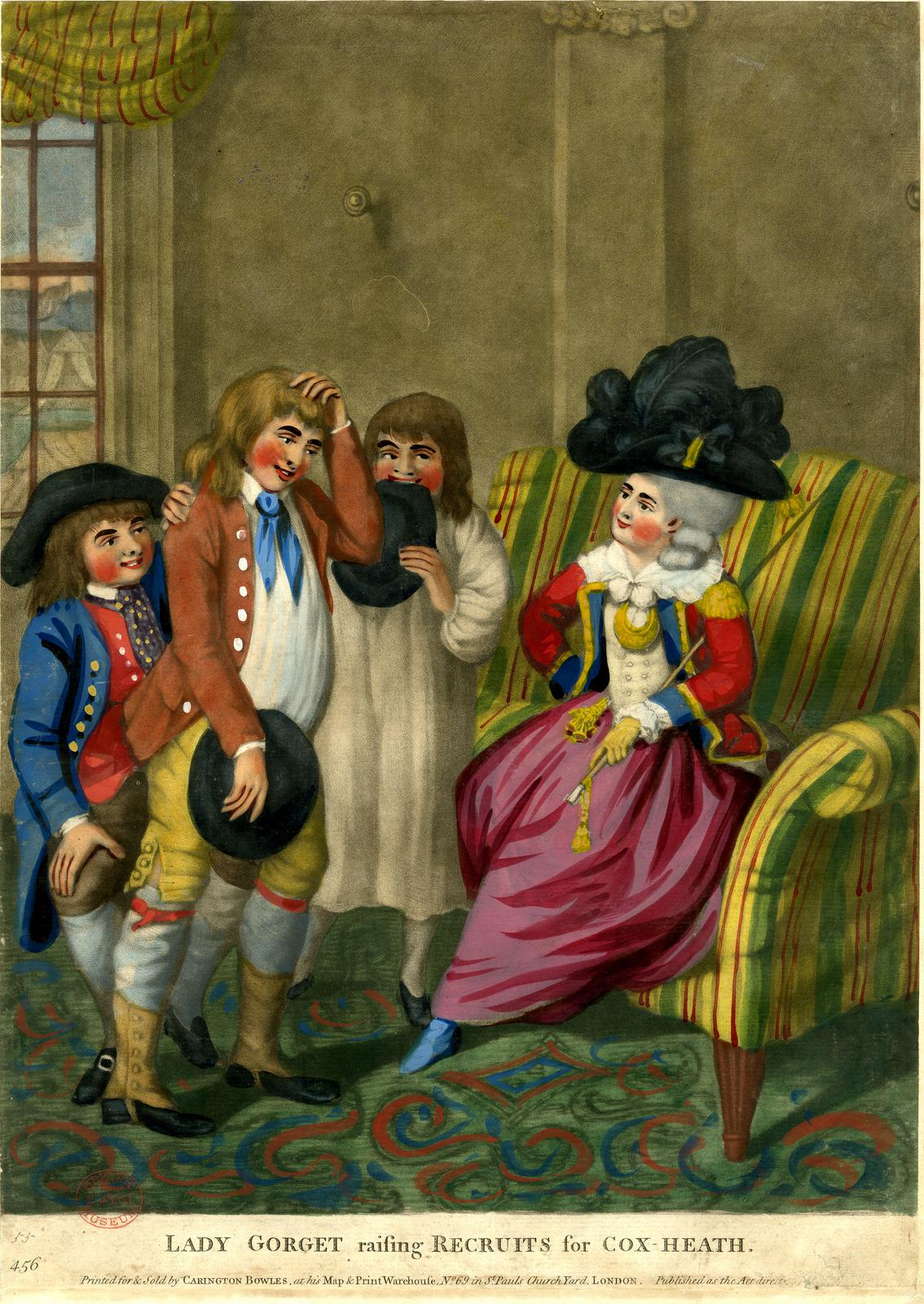
Caricature of Georgiana Cavendish, Duchess of Devonshire, by Robert Dighton.

In 1778 Parliament sanctioned the augmentation of the militia by voluntary enlistment, regiments being permitted to add a company to their balloted men. A caricature of the time entitled 'Lady Gorget raising Recruits for Cox-Heath' depicts the celebrity Duchess of Devonshire, who was prominent among the fashionable army wives at the camp, wearing a version of the Derbyshire Militia uniform (including an officer's Gorget), interviewing bashful yokels as potential recruits for her husband's regiment, with the tents of the camp visible through the window.

Over the following years it became common to assemble the militia in summer training camps alongside Regular forces. In the summer of 1779 the Derbyshires were at Warley in Essex, and in summer 1781 the regiment, 540 strong, formed part of the 3rd Brigade of the Plymouth garrison, accommodated in the town's barracks.

The Peace of Paris having been negotiated, the militia were sent to their home counties for disembodiment in March 1783. Having recently taken over as Lord Lieutenant of Derbyshire the Duke of Devonshire resigned the command in October and appointed his younger brother Lord George Henry Cavendish as colonel in his place.

From 1784 to 1792 the militia was kept up to strength by the ballot and was supposed to assemble for 28 days' training annually, even though to save money only two-thirds of the men were actually called out each year.

=== French Revolutionary War ===
The militia had already been embodied in December 1792 before Revolutionary France declared war on Britain on 1 February 1793. The French Revolutionary Wars saw a new phase for the English militia: they were embodied for a whole generation, and became regiments of full-time professional soldiers (though restricted to service in the British Isles), which the regular army increasingly saw as a prime source of recruits. They served in coast defences, manned garrisons, guarded prisoners of war, and carried out internal security duties, while their traditional local defence duties were taken over by the Volunteers and mounted Yeomanry.

Militia regiments were regularly moved around the country, often encamped in the summer and in barracks or billets for winter quarters. In August 1793 the Derbyshire Militia, with 9 companies, was at Warley Camp. In 1795 the regiment again added a volunteer company to its strength. In December 1796, along with the Bedfordshire and West Essex Militia it was one of the first regiments moved into the newly completed barracks at Horsham. On 17 February 1797 the militia were directed to be formed into brigades for their summer training. The Derbyshires, together with the Bedfordshires, Hampshires, East Suffolks and Yorkshire West Ridings, formed Gen Sir Charles Grey's 4th Brigade of the division under Gen Sir William Howe.

In 1796 the Government created the Supplementary Militia, a compulsory levy of men to be trained in their spare time, and to be incorporated in the Militia in emergency. The lieutenancies were required to carry out 20 days' initial training as soon as possible, and the existing militia regiments sent training detachments back to their home counties to carry this out. When the Supplementaries were mobilised in 1798 the Derbyshire lieutenancy chose to organise theirs into a separate regiment, rather than expanding the existing regiment.

On 8 July 1798 a general order was issued to form temporary battalions from the flank companies (Grenadier and Light companies) of militia regiments in the Southern District. The Grenadier Company of the Derbys joined those of the Bedfordshire, Denbighshire, Glamorgan, Middlesex and Northamptonshire Militia in the 3rd Grenadier Battalion at Shoreham-by-Sea, commanded by Lt-Col Payne of the Bedfordshires. That summer the Irish Rebellion became serious, with the French sending help to the rebels. The Derbyshire was one of the militia regiments that volunteered to serve in Ireland but its offer was not accepted.

=== Napoleonic Wars ===
The Treaty of Amiens was signed in March 1802 and the militia were disembodied. However, the Peace of Amiens proved short-lived, and the militia was embodied once more when hostilities broke out in 1803. The Derbyshire regiment was briefly numbered as 1st Derbyshire when the supplementaries were re-embodied as the 2nd Derbyshire from 1803 to 1806,

During the summer of 1805, when Napoleon was massing his 'Army of England' at Boulogne for a projected invasion, the 1st Derbyshire Militia, under Lt-Col the Hon John Simpson, consisted of 978 men, distributed along the Sussex Coast, with 4 companies at Eastbourne Camp, 2 at Langney Barracks, 2 at Culvercross Camp, and 2 at Wallsend Camp . It formed part of Brigadier-General Moore Disney's brigade headquartered at Eastbourne.

In 1811 an Interchange Act allowed English Militia units to volunteer to interchange with Irish Militia regiments for two years. It appears that the government was happy to send Midlands militia regiments to Ireland in case they developed sympathies with the Luddites, who had begun their machine-breaking in Nottingham. The Derbyshire Militia volunteered and served in Ireland in 1813–14. They were stationed at Cork in 1814.

=== 3rd Provisional Battalion ===
In November 1813 the militia were invited to volunteer for limited overseas service, primarily for garrison duties in Europe. A 125-strong detachment of the Derbyshire militia volunteered and were assigned to the 3rd Provisional Battalion alongside the Royal Denbigh Rifles, the Herefordshires, the Westmorlands, and the 2nd West Yorkshires, commanded by Col Sir Watkin Williams-Wynn, 5th Baronet, of the Denbighshires.

The battalion assembled at Chester and marched to Portsmouth where the Militia Brigade commanded by Maj-Gen Sir Henry Bayley was concentrating. The brigade embarked on 10–11 March 1814 and three days later arrived at Bordeaux, which had just been occupied by the Earl of Dalhousie's 7th Division. It did not take part in the Battle of Toulouse on 10 April, but carried out garrison and occupation duties as the war was ending. The 3rd Provisional Battalion was quartered in a villages along the River Gironde. The brigade did not form part of the Army of Occupation after the abdication of Napoleon and returned to Plymouth in June.

=== Dartmoor ===
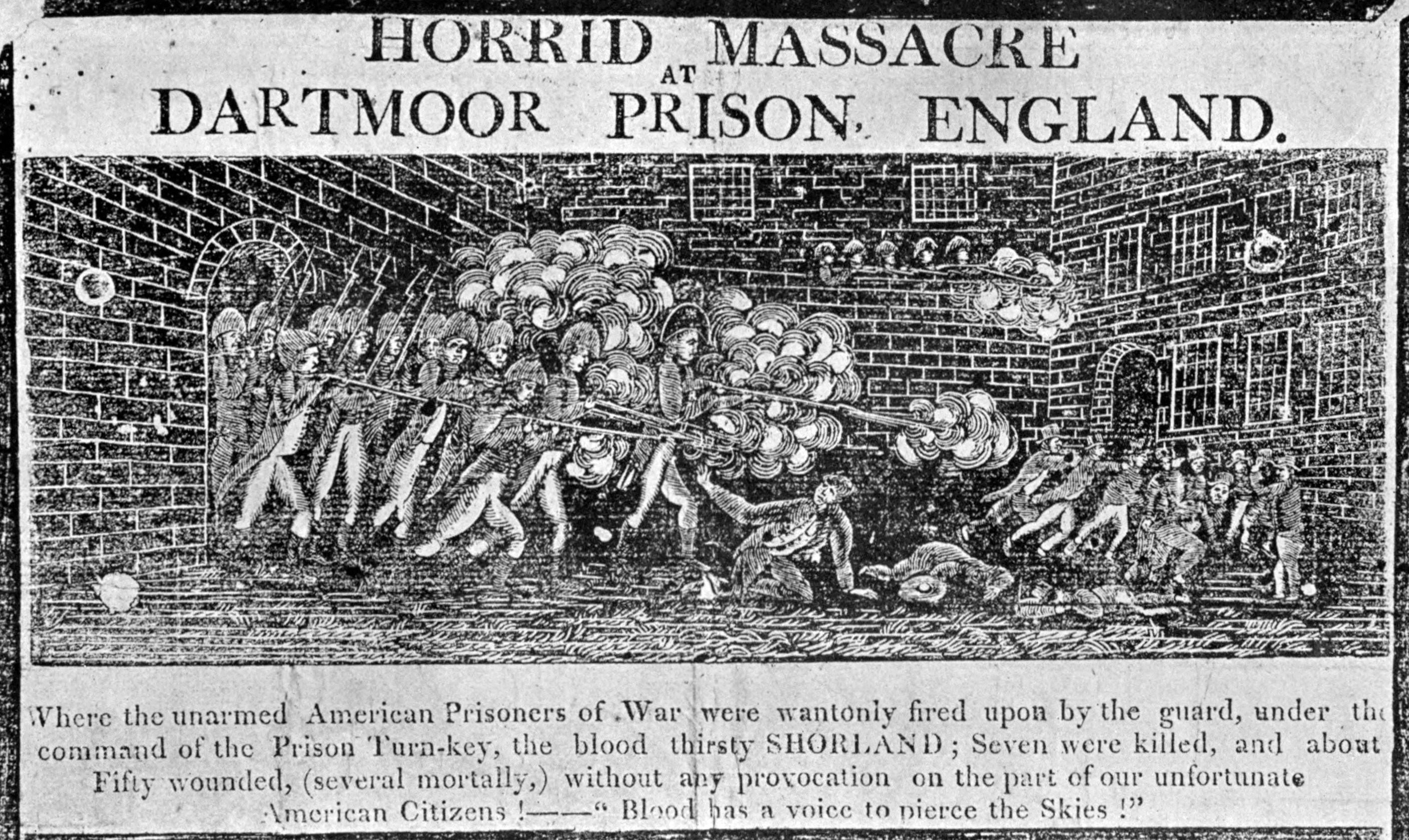
Old print reproduced by Baring-Gould, Devonshire Characters and Strange Events.

Many militia regiments were disembodied in 1814, but the Derbyshires continued in service and in March 1815 were on duty at Dartmoor Prison. The prison still housed American prisoners from the continuing War of 1812, the French having been repatriated. A peace treaty (the Treaty of Ghent) had been signed but US ships had not yet arrived to repatriate the prisoners-of-war. The American prisoners (mainly seamen) were turbulent, wanting to go home but fearful of being pressganged onto US warships for the Second Barbary War. On 6 April some of them made a small breach in the barrack wall and the alarm was sounded, calling out the guard (Derbyshire and 1st Somerset Militia). On this a crowd of prisoners filled the inner courtyard and surged towards the gates. The guard blocked the way but the crowd of prisoners pressed against them, one attempting to seize a militiaman's musket, at which the man fired. Firing then became general, allegedly ordered by the prison governor, although the militia claimed that most of their shots went over the prisoners' heads. Major Joliffe with the Grenadier Company of the 1st Somerset arrived from the barracks and halted the firing. By the time the riot was quelled five prisoners had been killed and 34 wounded (according to the initial inquiry). At the subsequent coroner's inquest a jury of Dartmoor famers brought in a verdict of 'justifiable homicide'. A later commission of inquiry found the evidence contradictory.

=== Long peace ===
Napoleon's escape from Elba led to the Hundred Days' campaign culminating in the Battle of Waterloo. After Waterloo the disembodiment of the militia could be resumed, and all remaining units had been stood down before the and of 1816. After Waterloo there was a long peace. Although officers continued to be commissioned into the militia and ballots were still held, the regiments were rarely assembled for training and the permanent staffs of sergeants and drummers were progressively reduced. Lieutenant-Col Henry Cavendish, 3rd Baron Waterpark, resigned from the King's Own Staffordshire Militia in 1832 and was then appointed colonel of the Derbyshires.

== 1852 Reforms ==
The Militia of the United Kingdom was revived by the Militia Act 1852, enacted during a renewed period of international tension. As before, units were recruited and administered on a county basis, and filled by voluntary enlistment (although conscription by means of the Militia Ballot could be used if the counties failed to meet their quotas). Training was for 56 days on enlistment, then for 21–28 days per year, during which the men received full army pay. The Militia was transferred from the Home Office to the War Office (WO). Under the Act, militia units could be embodied by Royal Proclamation for full-time home defence service in three circumstances:

1. 'Whenever a state of war exists between Her Majesty and any foreign power'.
2. 'In all cases of invasion or upon imminent danger thereof'.
3. 'In all cases of rebellion or insurrection'.

Lord Waterpark remained colonel of the Derbyshires but new younger officers, several of them ex-Regulars, were appointed to the revived regiment, including Edward Coke, formerly of the 69th Foot, who was appointed Lt-Col on 18 November 1853.

=== Crimean War ===
The Crimean War having broken out and a large expeditionary force sent overseas in 1854, the militia were called out for home defence. The Derbyshires were embodied at Derby by the beginning of February 1855. The 2nd Derbyshire Militia (Chatsworth Rifles) was formed at Chesterfield in January 1855, and the original regiment became the 1st Derbyshire Militia once more. The regiment remained at Derby for its entire embodiment, which ended after the Treaty of Paris was signed at the end of March 1856. (Note: Some sources claim that the regiment was embodied during the Indian Mutiny for 15 months in 1857, but this is not borne out by the monthly lists of 'Stations of the Embodied Militia' published in the Edinburgh Gazette.)

Thereafter the militia regularly carried out their peacetime annual training. The Militia Reserve introduced in 1867 consisted of present and former militiamen who undertook to serve overseas in case of war.

As part of the 1852 reforms, the position of Colonel in the militia was abolished for the future, and the lieutenant-colonel became commanding officer (CO). Lieutenant-Col Coke remained CO after the death of Lord Waterpark in 1863. He was appointed as the regiment's first Honorary Colonel on 7 February 1877, when Ashton Mosley, formerly of the 60th Rifles , who had been the regiment's senior major since 1852, was promoted to succeed him as CO.

== Cardwell and Childers reforms ==
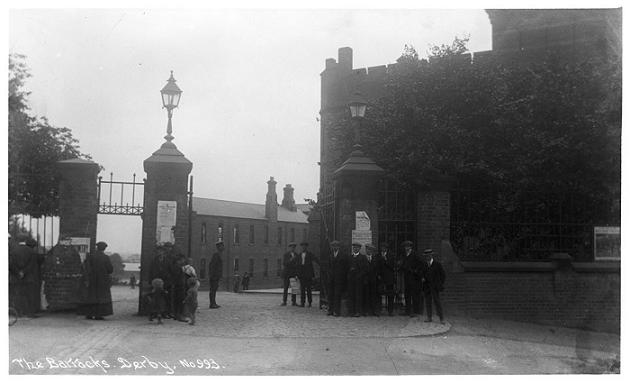
Normanton Barracks outside Derby, depot of the Sherwood Foresters.

Under the 'Localisation of the Forces' scheme introduced by the Cardwell Reforms in 1872, Regular infantry battalions were linked together and assigned to particular counties or localities, while the county Militia and Volunteers were affiliated to them in a 'sub-district' with a shared depot. Sub-District No 26 (County of Derby) comprised:

- 54th (West Norfolk) Regiment of Foot
- 95th (Derbyshire) Regiment of Foot
- 2nd Derbyshire Militia (Chatsworth Rifles) at Chesterfield
- 1st Derbyshire Militia at Derby
- 1st Administrative Battalion, Derbyshire Rifle Volunteer Corps at Derby
- 2nd Administrative Battalion, Derbyshire Rifle Volunteer Corps at Bakewell

The sub-districts were to establish brigade depots, and 26th Brigade built Normanton Barracks outside Derby in 1874–7.

Militia battalions now came under the War Office rather than their lords lieutenant. They had a large cadre of permanent staff (about 30) and a number of the officers were former Regulars. Around a third of the recruits and many young officers went on to join the Regular Army.

Although often referred to as brigades, the regimental districts were purely administrative organisations, but in a continuation of the Cardwell Reforms a mobilisation scheme began to appear in the Army List from December 1875. This assigned regular and militia units to places in an order of battle of corps, divisions and brigades for the 'Active Army', even though these formations were entirely theoretical, with no staff or services assigned. The 1st and 2nd Derbyshire Militia were both assigned to 2nd Brigade of 3rd Division, VI Corps. The brigade would have mustered at Preston in Lancashire in time of war.

=== 5th (1st Derbyshire Militia) Bn, Sherwood Foresters ===
The 1881 Childers Reforms took Cardwell's scheme a stage further, the linked regular regiments combining into single two-battalion regiments. However, the 95th Foot was now linked with the 45th (Nottinghamshire) (Sherwood Foresters) Regiment of Foot to form a combined Sherwood Foresters (Derbyshire Regiment):

- 1st Battalion (ex-45th Foot)
- 2nd Battalion (ex-95th Foot)
- 3rd (2nd Derbyshire Militia) Battalion moved from Chesterfield to Derby
- 4th (Royal Sherwood Foresters Militia) Battalion at Newark-on-Trent
- 5th (1st Derbyshire Militia) Battalion at Derby
- 45th Regimental Depot at Derby
- 1st & 2nd Derbyshire Volunteer Battalions
- 1st & 2nd Nottinghamshire Volunteer Battalions

== Disbandment ==
The 3rd and 5th Battalions of the Sherwood Foresters merged in 1891 as the 3rd Battalion. The officers retained their respective seniority, so Lt-Col W.L. Coke of the 5th Bn (15 May 1887) took command, with Lt-Col Moore of 3rd Bn (17 March 1888) as second Lt-Col. The two Honorary Colonels – Lord Roberts (5th Bn) and Spencer Cavendish, 8th Duke of Devonshire (3rd Bn) – remained joint Hon Cols of the merged battalion.

== Heritage & Ceremonial ==
=== Precedence ===
At the time of the Seven Years' War, county militia regiments determined their respective precedence by drawing lots. During the War of American Independence the counties were given an order of precedence determined by ballot each year. For Derbyshire the positions were:

- 14th on 1 June 1778
- 22nd on 12 May 1779
- 19th on 6 May 1780
- 38th on 28 April 1781
- 27th on 7 May 1782

The militia order of precedence balloted for in 1793 (Derbyshire was 26th) remained in force throughout the French Revolutionary War. Another ballot took place in 1803 at the start of the Napoleonic War, when Buckinghamshire was 67th.

In 1833 the system was regularised, the king drawing the numbers for individual regiments. The first 47 places went to regiments raised before 1763, the next 22 were for those raised between 1763 and 1783. The (1st) Derbyshire regiment received 62nd place. In 1855 the list was revised to account for the new regiments, and the 2nd Derbyshire received the number 34, which had been vacated by the conversion of the East Suffolk Militia to artillery. This explains why the 2nd Derbys were listed ahead of the 1st Derbys under the Cardwell system, and became the 3rd Bn of the Sherwood Foresters ahead of the 4th (Nottinghamshire Militia) Bn (ranked 59th) and the 5th (1st Derby Militia) Bn (ranked 62nd), and ultimately why the 3rd Bn continued while the 5th was disbanded.

=== Uniforms & Insignia ===
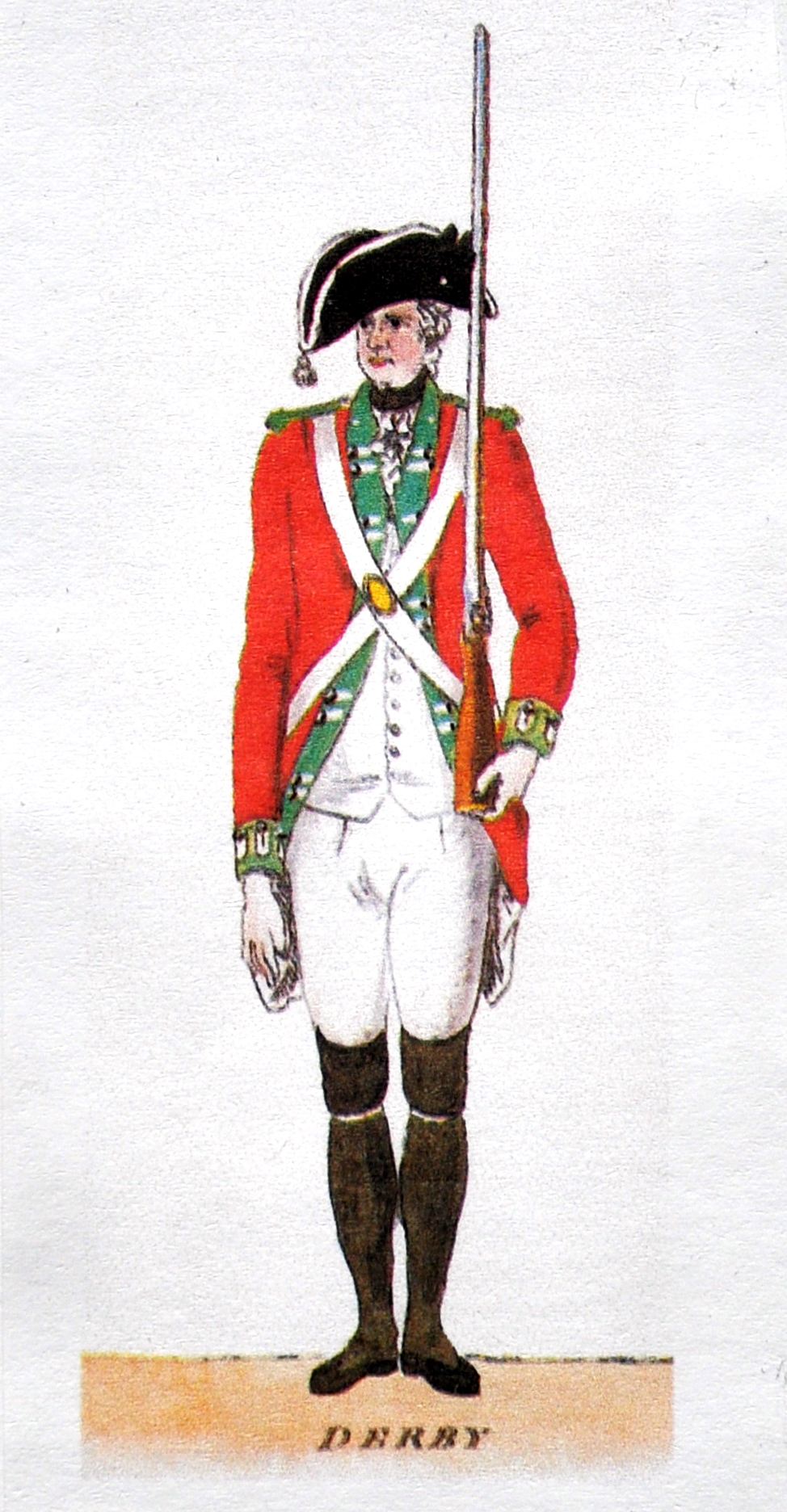
The uniform of the Derbyshire Militia in 1780.

The Duke of Devonshire outfitted the regiment with a particularly light uniform, perhaps an undress uniform, for its first summer camp at Coxheath, and deserter notices of 1779 refer to white jackets faced with green and leather breeches. The full dress uniform recorded in 1780 and 1781 was red with mid-green facings and button-loops in pairs. By 1800 the facings had changed to yellow.

The earliest recorded button design is in pewter, with an outer ring enclosing the words DERBY above MIL:^{A}. By 1803 the officers' buttons and belt plates carried the badge associated with Derbyshire of a rose on an escutcheon surmounted by a crown, with DERBYSHIRE beneath. The tunic buttons of 1855–81 had the Royal cypher and crown with 'First Derby' above and 'Militia' below, and the officers' belt plates had the cypher and crown in the centre of a circles inscribed with the title.

After 1881 the 1st Derbyshire Militia adopted the white facings of the Sherwood Foresters, together with its cap badge and other insignia. However, the Foresters incorporated the rose and escutcheon into their full dress helmet plate.

=== Commanders ===
Colonels The following served as Colonel of the Regiment:

- Lord George Cavendish 1773–78
- William Cavendish, 5th Duke of Devonshire commissioned April 1778
- Lord George Henry Cavendish commissioned 28 October 1783
- Henry Cavendish, 3rd Baron Waterpark, commissioned 12 April 1832, died 1863

Honorary Colonels

- Edward Coke, former CO, appointed 7 February 1877
- Frederick, Lord Roberts, appointed 29 December 1888

Lieutenant-Colonels commandant

- Edward Coke, appointed 18 November 1853
- Ashton Mosley, promoted 7 February 1877
- W.L. Coke, promoted 15 May 1887

== See also ==
- Militia (Great Britain)
- Militia (United Kingdom)
- Derbyshire Militia
- 2nd Derbyshire Militia (Chatsworth Rifles)
- Sherwood Foresters
