= 2nd Derbyshire Militia (Chatsworth Rifles) =

Auxiliary unit of the British Army

2nd Derbyshire Militia (Chatsworth Rifles) 3rd (Reserve) Bn Sherwood Foresters
- Active: 12 January 1855–April 1953
- Country: United Kingdom
- Branch: Militia/Special Reserve
- Role: Infantry
- Size: 1 Battalion
- Part of: Sherwood Foresters
- Garrison/HQ: Chesterfield (1855–81); Normanton Barracks (from 1881)

The 2nd Derbyshire Militia (Note: There is no consistency in the sources as to whether the regiment was the 'Derby' or 'Derbyshire' Militia, both forms being used indiscriminately.) was an auxiliary regiment raised in the county of Derbyshire in the North Midlands of England during the Crimean War. It later became part of the Sherwood Foresters. It transferred to the Special Reserve (SR) under the Haldane Reforms and supplied reinforcements to the fighting battalions during World War I. After a shadowy postwar existence the unit was finally disbanded in 1953.

== Background ==
The universal obligation to military service in the Shire levy was long established in England and its legal basis was updated by two acts of 1557 (4 & 5 Ph. & M. cc. 2 and 3). They were placed under the command of county Lords Lieutenant appointed by the monarch. This is seen as the starting date for the organised county militia in England. From 1572 the practice was only to call out and train a certain number of selected men, the 'Trained Bands'. These were an important element in the country's defence at the time of the Spanish Armada. Control of the militia was one of the areas of dispute between King Charles I and Parliament that led to the English Civil War. The English Militia was re-established under local control in 1662 after the Restoration of the monarchy. However, between periods of national emergency the militia was regularly allowed to decline.

Under threat of French invasion during the Seven Years' War a series of Militia Acts from 1757 reorganised the county militia regiments, the men being conscripted by means of parish ballots (paid substitutes were permitted) to serve for three years. Derbyshire's quota was set at 560 men, but the regiment was not actually formed until 1773. The reformed regiment was 'embodied' for permanent service in home defence during the War of American Independence. In peacetime the militia assembled for 28 days' annual training. The militia were re-embodied shortly before the outbreak of the French Revolutionary War in 1793, and served until the brief Peace of Amiens of 1802–3.

A 2nd Derbyshire Militia existed briefly between 1803 and 1806 when the Derbyshire Supplementary Militia of 1797–8 was re-raised on the outbreak of the Napoleonic Wars During the French wars, the militia were embodied for a whole generation, and became regiments of full-time professional soldiers (though restricted to service in the British Isles), which the regular army increasingly saw as a prime source of recruits. They served in coast defences, manned garrisons, guarded prisoners of war, and carried out internal security duties. Once again, the militia was allowed to decline in the years of the long peace that followed the Battle of Waterloo.

== 1852 reform ==
The long-standing Militia of the United Kingdom was revived by the Militia Act 1852, enacted during a period of international tension. As before, units were raised and administered on a county basis, and filled by voluntary enlistment (although conscription by means of the militia ballot might be used if the counties failed to meet their quotas). Training was for 56 days on enlistment, then for 21–28 days per year, during which the men received full army pay. Under the Act, militia units could be embodied by Royal Proclamation for full-time service in three circumstances:

1. 'Whenever a state of war exists between Her Majesty and any foreign power'.
2. 'In all cases of invasion or upon imminent danger thereof'.
3. 'In all cases of rebellion or insurrection'.

=== 2nd Derbyshire Militia ===
War having broken out with Russia in 1854 and an expeditionary force sent to the Crimea, the militia were called out for home defence and service in overseas garrisons. Additional militia regiments were also formed at this time, and a 2nd Derbyshire Militia was raised at Chesterfield on 21 January 1855. Its status as a rifle corps was approved on 22 March, and on 22 May it was given the subtitle Chatsworth Rifles. (Note: Not to be confused with the 16th (Service) Battalion, Sherwood Foresters (Chatsworth Rifles) formed in 1915 as part of 'Kitchener's Army') Chatsworth House is the seat of the Dukes of Devonshire; the 6th Duke was Lord Lieutenant of Derbyshire at the time and responsible for raising the regiment. Two of his kinsmen, William Henry Frederick Cavendish, a former officer in the 52nd Foot, and Lord Cavendish of Keighley, were appointed as Lieutenant-Colonel Commandant and Major and second-in-command respectively, while a third, the Hon William Cavendish, MP, formerly of the 10th Hussars (later Lord Chesham), was one of the captains. Several of the other officers had previous experience with the Regular Army.

The new regiment was embodied for permanent service by the end of April 1855, but remained training at Chesterfield until the war was ended by the Treaty of Paris in March 1856, and was disembodied later that year.

Thereafter the militia regularly carried out their peacetime annual training. The Militia Reserve introduced in 1867 consisted of present and former militiamen who undertook to serve overseas in case of war.

Lord Cavendish of Keighley, now Marquess of Hartington since his father had succeeded as 8th Duke of Devonshire, was appointed as the regiment's Honorary Colonel in 1871, while William Cavendish remained Lt-Col Comdt.

== Cardwell and Childers reforms ==
Under the 'Localisation of the Forces' scheme introduced by the Cardwell Reforms in 1872, Regular infantry battalions were linked together and assigned to particular counties or localities, while the county Militia and Volunteers were affiliated to them in a 'sub-district' with a shared depot. Sub-District No 26 (County of Derby) comprised:

- 54th (West Norfolk) Regiment of Foot
- 95th (Derbyshire) Regiment of Foot
- 1st Derby Militia at Derby
- 2nd Derby Militia at Chesterfield
- 45th Regimental Depot to be formed at Derby
- 1st Administrative Battalion, Derbyshire Rifle Volunteer Corps at Derby
- 2nd Administrative Battalion, Derbyshire Rifle Volunteer Corps at Bakewell

Militia battalions now came under the War Office rather than their lords lieutenant. They had a large cadre of permanent staff (about 30) and a number of the officers were former Regulars. Around a third of the recruits and many young officers went on to join the Regular Army.

Although often referred to as brigades, the regimental districts were purely administrative organisations, but in a continuation of the Cardwell Reforms a mobilisation scheme began to appear in the Army List from December 1875. This assigned regular and militia units to places in an order of battle of corps, divisions and brigades for the 'Active Army', even though these formations were entirely theoretical, with no staff or services assigned. The 1st and 2nd Derbyshire Militia were both assigned to 2nd Brigade of 3rd Division, VI Corps. The brigade would have mustered at Preston in Lancashire in time of war.

The Marquess of Hartington's younger brother Lord Edward Cavendish was promoted to Lt-Col Comdt on 9 April 1881. He had been commissioned as an ensign in the regiment on 30 January 1856, and had then served as a Regular officer in the Rifle Brigade from 1858 to 1865. He had rejoined the regiment as a captain in 1866 and been promoted to major in 1874.

=== 3rd Battalion, Sherwood Foresters ===
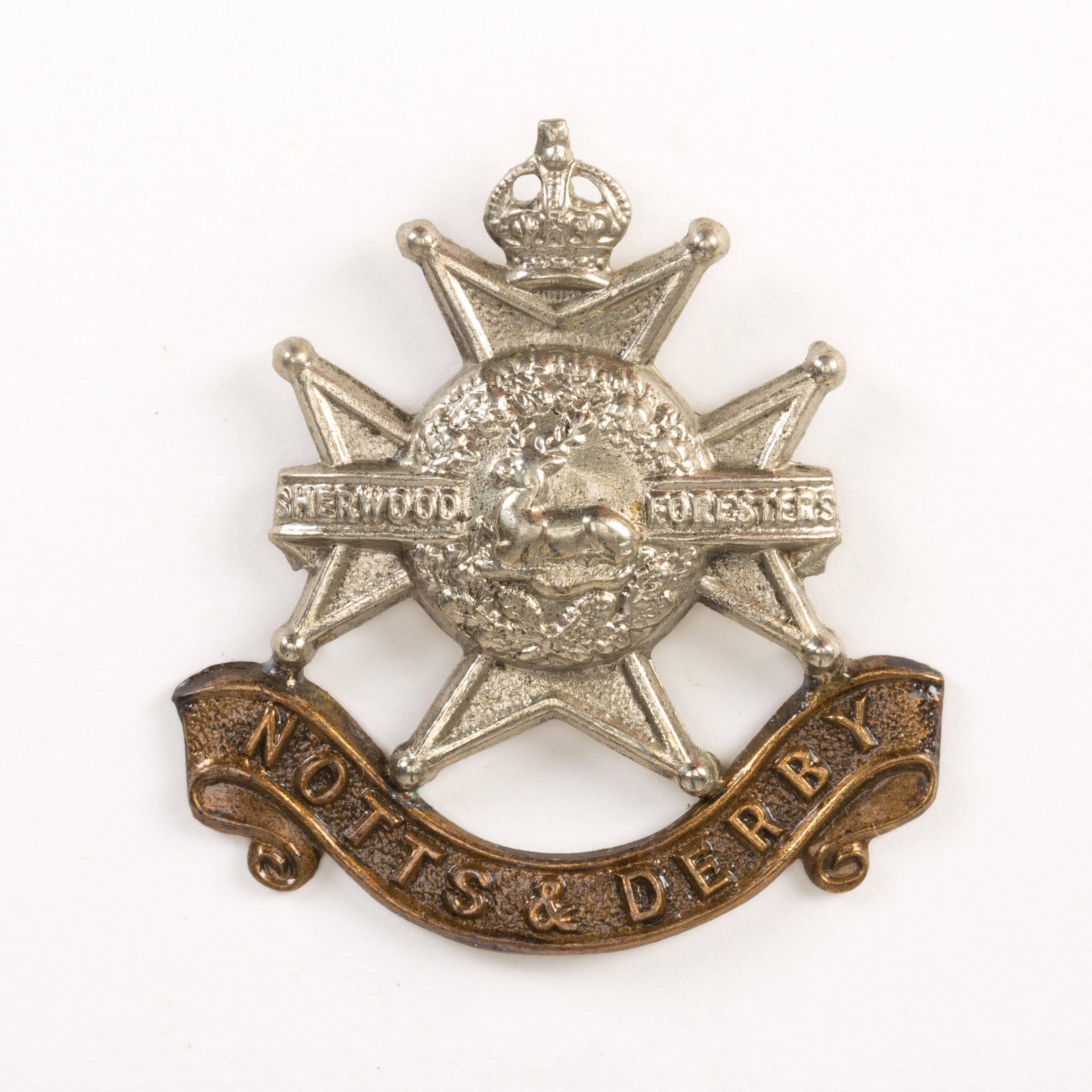
Cap badge of the Sherwood Foresters (post-1902 version)

The 1881 Childers Reforms took Cardwell's scheme a stage further, the linked regular regiments combining into single two-battalion regiments. However, the 95th Foot was now linked with the 45th (Nottinghamshire) (Sherwood Foresters) Regiment of Foot to form a combined Sherwood Foresters (Derbyshire Regiment):

- 1st Battalion (ex-45th Foot)
- 2nd Battalion (ex-95th Foot)
- 3rd (2nd Derbyshire Militia) Battalion (Chatsworth Rifles) moved from Chesterfield to Derby
- 4th (Royal Sherwood Foresters Militia) Battalion at Newark-on-Trent
- 5th (1st Derbyshire Militia) Battalion at Derby
- 45th Regimental Depot at Normanton Barracks outside Derby
- 1st & 2nd Derbyshire Volunteer Battalions
- 1st & 2nd Nottinghamshire Volunteer Battalions

Lt-Col Lord Edward Cavendish transferred to command the 1st Volunteer Battalion of the King's Own Royal Regiment (Lancaster) on 17 March 1888, and Maj Joseph Moore was promoted to replace him.

The 3rd and 5th Battalions merged in 1891 as the 3rd Battalion. The officers retained their respective seniority, so Lt-Col W.L. Coke of the 5th Bn (15 May 1887) took command, with Moore of 3rd Bn (17 March 1888) as second Lt-Col. The two Honorary Colonels – the Marquess of Hartington, now 8th Duke of Devonshire (3rd Bn) and Lord Roberts (5th Bn) – remained joint Hon Cols of the merged battalion. Lieutenant-Col Moore succeeded to the command of the combined battalion on 19 January 1898.

=== Second Boer War ===
After the disasters of Black Week at the start of the Second Boer War in December 1899, most of the regular army was sent to South Africa, followed by many militia reservists as reinforcements. Militia units were embodied to replace them for home defence and the 3rd Sherwoods was called out between 23 January and 4 December 1900.

The Hon Alfred Curzon was promoted to command the battalion on 3 October 1903.

== Special Reserve ==
After the Boer War, the future of the militia was called into question. There were moves to reform the Auxiliary Forces (Militia, Yeomanry and Volunteers) to take their place in the six Army Corps proposed by the Secretary of State for War, St John Brodrick. However, little of Brodrick's scheme was carried out. Under the more sweeping Haldane Reforms of 1908, the Militia was replaced by the Special Reserve (SR), a semi-professional force whose role was to provide reinforcement drafts for regular units serving overseas in wartime, rather like the earlier Militia Reserve. The Derby battalion became the 3rd (Reserve) Battalion, Sherwood Foresters, on 26 July 1908; the Nottinghamshire battalion became the 4th (Extra Reserve) Bn.

The Duke of Devonshire had recently died, and Lord Roberts was re-appointed as sole Hon Col of the merged battalion.

=== Mobilisation ===
When World War I broke out the 3rd (R) Bn was embodied on 4 August 1914 under Lt-Col Edward Heath, who had held the command since 7 November 1912. It went to its war station at Plymouth, and then joined the 4th (ER) Bn at Sunderland in May 1915. The two battalions remained there for the rest of the war in the Tyne Garrison. There they carried out their twin roles of forming part of the East Coast defences and preparing Army Reservists, Special Reservists, and later new recruits as reinforcement drafts for the Regular battalions serving on the Western Front.

Under War Office Instruction 106 of 10 November 1915 the battalion was ordered to send a draft of 109 men to the new Machine Gun Training Centre at Grantham where they were to form the basis of a brigade machine-gun company of the new Machine Gun Corps. In addition, 10 men at a time were to undergo training at Grantham as battalion machine gunners. The order stated that 'Great care should be taken in the selection of men for training as machine gunners as only well educated and intelligent men are suitable for this work'.

Major Edward Wise was promoted to take over command of the battalion on 16 November 1916.

Training continued after the Armistice with Germany, but on 18 October 1919 the 3rd (R) Bn's remaining personnel were drafted to the 1st Bn, and it was disembodied on 24 October.

=== 13th (Reserve) Battalion, Sherwood Foresters ===
After Lord Kitchener issued his call for volunteers in August 1914, the battalions of the 1st, 2nd and 3rd New Armies ('K1', 'K2' and 'K3' of 'Kitchener's Army') were quickly formed at the regimental depots. The SR battalions also swelled with new recruits and were soon well above their establishment strength. On 8 October 1914 each SR battalion was ordered to use the surplus to form a service battalion of the 4th New Army ('K4'). Accordingly, the 3rd (Reserve) Bn formed the 13th (Service) Bn, Sherwood Foresters at Plymouth. Lieutenant-Col Harry Thompson, a former officer of the 1st Gurkha Rifles, was appointed CO on 19 October. It became part of 98th Brigade in 33rd Division. In April 1915 the War Office decided to convert the K4 battalions into 2nd Reserve units, providing drafts for the K1–K3 battalions in the same way that the SR was doing for the Regular battalions. 98th Brigade became 10th Reserve Brigade and the battalion became 13th (Reserve) Battalion, training drafts for the 9th, 10th, 11th and 12th (Service) Bns of the regiment. By June 1915 it was at Lichfield alongside the 14th (R) Bn (formed by the 4th (ER) Bn) in 3rd Reserve Brigade. On 14 February 1916 Lt-Col William Grant took over as CO of the battalion. By March 1916 the brigade was at Brocton Camp on Cannock Chase. On 1 September 1916 the 2nd Reserve battalions were transferred to the Training Reserve (TR) and the battalion was redesignated 12th Training Reserve Bn, still in 3rd Reserve Bde. The training staff retained their Sherwood Foresters badges.

12th TR Battalion specialised as a 'Young Soldier' unit carrying out basic training, and on 1 November 1917 it joined the Leicestershire Regiment as 53rd (Young Soldier) Bn. By now it was at Rugeley in Staffordshire as part of 1st Reserve Brigade, moving in about October 1918 to Clipstone Camp in Nottinghamshire. It continued training reinforcements until the end of the war.

Postwar, 53rd (YS) Bn and the 51st and 52nd Graduated (training) battalions of the Leicesters were converted into service battalions on 8 February 1919. In March they went to Germany where they joined 2nd Midland Infantry Brigade in Midland Division (the former 6th Division) of the British Army of the Rhine. 53rd (S) Battalion was absorbed into 51st and 52nd (S) Bns on 12 April 1919.

=== Postwar ===
The disembodied SR resumed its old title of Militia in 1921 but like most militia units the 3rd Sherwood Foresters remained in abeyance after World War I. By the outbreak of World War II in 1939, the only officer still listed for the regiment was the Honorary Colonel, Lt-Gen Sir Frederick Shaw, appointed in 1921. The Militia was formally disbanded in April 1953.

== Heritage & Ceremonial ==
=== Uniforms & Insignia ===
As a rifle corps the 2nd Derbys wore a Rifle green uniform with black facings in imitation of the Rifle Brigade instead of the red coats and yellow facings of the 1st Derbys.

In 1881 the battalion adopted the red tunic and white facings of the Sherwood Foresters, together with its cap badge and other insignia.

=== Precedence ===
In the 18th Century county militia regiments took their precedence by a system of annual ballots, later by a ballot at the beginning of each embodiment. In 1833 the system was regularised, the king drawing the numbers for individual regiments. The first 47 places went to regiments raised before 1763, the next 22 were for those raised between 1763 and 1783. The (1st) Derbyshire regiment received 62nd place. In 1855 the list was revised to account for the new regiments, and the 2nd Derbyshire received the number 34, which had been vacated by the conversion of the East Suffolk Militia to artillery. This explains why the 2nd Derbys were listed ahead of the 1st Derbys under the Cardwell system, and became the 3rd Bn of the Sherwood Foresters ahead of the 4th (Nottinghamshire Militia) Bn (ranked 59th) and the 5th (1st Derby Militia) Bn (ranked 62nd).

=== Memorials ===
The 3rd Battalion erected a memorial plaque in All Saints' Church, Derby (now Derby Cathedral) to the officers, warrant officers, NCOs and men of the battalion who died in World War I.

The Sherwood Foresters' regimental war memorial, Crich Stand, consists of a tower topped by a lantern erected in 1923 on a hilltop overlooking the village of Crich close to the Nottinghamshire–Derbyshire boundary.

=== Commanders ===
Honorary Colonels The following served as Honorary Colonel of the regiment:

- Spencer Cavendish, 8th Duke of Devonshire, appointed 6 May 1871; joint Hon Col from 1 April 1891, died 24 March 1908
- Field Marshal Frederick Roberts, 1st Earl Roberts, appointed (to 5th Bn) 29 December 1888; joint Hon Col from 1 April 1891; re-appointed to combined 3rd (R) Bn 26 July 1908, died 14 November 1914
- Hon Alfred Curzon, former CO, appointed 1 September 1918, died 20 September 1920
- Lieutenant-General Sir Frederick Shaw, appointed 11 January 1921, died 6 January 1942

Commanding officers The following served as Commanding Officer of the regiment:

- Lt-Col William Henry Frederick Cavendish, appointed 25 January 1855
- Lt-Col Lord Edward Cavendish, promoted 9 April 1881
- Lt-Col W.L. Coke, promoted (to 5th Bn) 15 May 1887, combined Bn 1 April 1891
- Lt-Col Joseph Moore, promoted (to 3rd Bn) 17 March 1888; combined Bn 19 January 1898
- Lt-Col Hon Alfred Curzon, promoted 3 October 1903
- Lt-Col L.S. Gordon-Cumming, retired Regular officer, appointed 7 November 1908
- Lt-Col Edward Heath, promoted 7 November 1912
- Lt-Col Henry Wise, promoted 16 November 1916

== See also ==
- Militia (United Kingdom)
- Derbyshire Militia
- 1st Derbyshire Militia
- Sherwood Foresters
