= The Derbyshire Blues =

Coordinates: 52°55′25″N 1°28′39″W

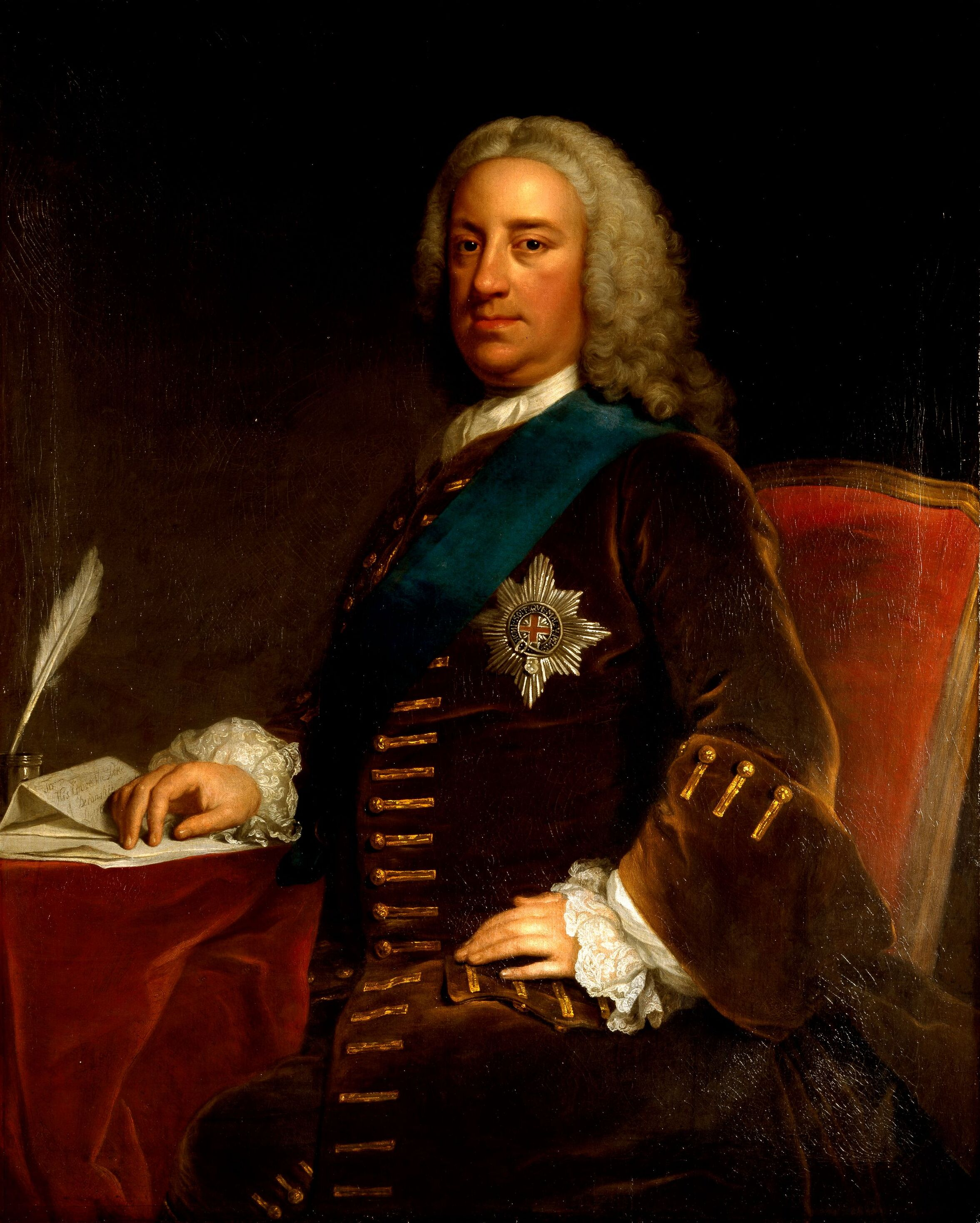
The Duke of Devonshire, who raised the regiment

The Derbyshire Blues were a militia regiment raised in Derby by the Duke of Devonshire in response to the invasion by Charles Edward Stuart ('Bonnie Prince Charlie') in 1745. As Lord Lieutenant of Derbyshire, the Duke had responsibility for raising a militia in defence of the realm, and as a member of the Whig aristocracy he was opposed to any attempt to usurp King George II. The Militia Act 1745 made provision for calling out the militia in England during the Jacobite rising, and on 13 September 1745 the Government sent letters directing the lord-lieutenants of counties in England and Wales to call out the militia. The militia system having decayed during the years of peace, most counties found it easier to raise troops by voluntary enlistment rather than them being levied by the parishes and hundreds of the county as required under the Militia Acts.

== Formation and use of George Inn as headquarters ==
A meeting had taken place on 28 September at the George Inn, a coaching inn in Iron Gate, Derby, "to consider of such measures as are fit to be taken for the support of the Royal Person and government of H. M. King George, and our happy constitution in Church and State, at a time when rebellion is carrying on in favour of a Popish Pretender." The name of the unit is derived from the colour of the blue uniform, intended to distinguish it from regular soldiers in red uniform.

The Duke arrived in Derby from Chatsworth with his son, the Marquess of Hartington, towards the end of November 1745 (the Jacobites had entered Preston on the 26th), and used the George Inn as his headquarters. He reviewed 600 men in two regiments of 300 men each, raised by subscription by the gentlemen of Derby and Derbyshire, and 120 men raised and paid for by the Duke himself. The regiments were led by Sir Nathaniel Curzon and the Marquess of Hartington. However, these troops withdrew towards Nottingham on 3 December on the news that Charles Edward Stuart had entered Ashbourne, approximately 13 miles away, with 9000 men.

When the prince arrived in Derby on 4 December, he called at the inn and demanded billets for his troops. The event is re-enacted every year on the anniversary of the Prince's arrival.

== The George Inn ==
The inn is now a public house called "Jorrocks", having had several different names since the 1980s. First, it changed from "The George" to "Mr. Jorrocks", only to be renamed "Lafferty’s" during a fad period for Irish theme pubs, and "Mr Jorrocks" for a while in the 2000s, before taking on its current name.

== See also ==
- Derbyshire Militia
