= Sherwood Foresters =

Infantry regiment of the British Army

Sherwood Foresters (Derbyshire Regiment) Sherwood Foresters (Nottinghamshire and Derbyshire Regiment)
- Cap Badge of the Sherwood Foresters
- Active: 1881–1970
- Country: United Kingdom
- Branch: British Army
- Type: Infantry
- Role: Line infantry
- Size: 1–2 Regular battalions 2 Militia and Special Reserve battalions 2–4 Territorial and Volunteer battalions Up to 13 Hostilities-only battalions
- Garrison/HQ: Normanton Barracks, Derby
- Anniversaries: Badajoz (6 April); Alma (20 September)

The Sherwood Foresters (Nottinghamshire and Derbyshire Regiment) was a line infantry regiment of the British Army in existence for just under 90 years, from 1881 to 1970. In 1970, the regiment was amalgamated with the Worcestershire Regiment to form the Worcestershire and Sherwood Foresters Regiment, which in 2007 was amalgamated with the Cheshire Regiment and the Staffordshire Regiment (Prince of Wales's) to form the present Mercian Regiment. The lineage of the Sherwood Foresters is now continued by The Mercian Regiment.

== History ==
=== Pre 1914 history ===
The regiment was formed on 1 July 1881 as part of the Childers Reforms. The 45th (Nottinghamshire) Regiment of Foot (raised in 1741) and the 95th (Derbyshire) Regiment of Foot (raised in 1823) were redesignated as the 1st and 2nd battalions of the Sherwood Foresters (Derbyshire Regiment). The 2nd Derbyshire Militia (Chatsworth Rifles), Royal Sherwood Foresters Militia and 1st Derbyshire Militia became the 3rd, 4th and 5th battalions respectively (the 3rd and 5th Bns amalgamated in 1891). These were joined by the 1st and 2nd (Derbyshire) and the 3rd (Robin Hood) and 4th (Nottinghamshire) Volunteer battalions.

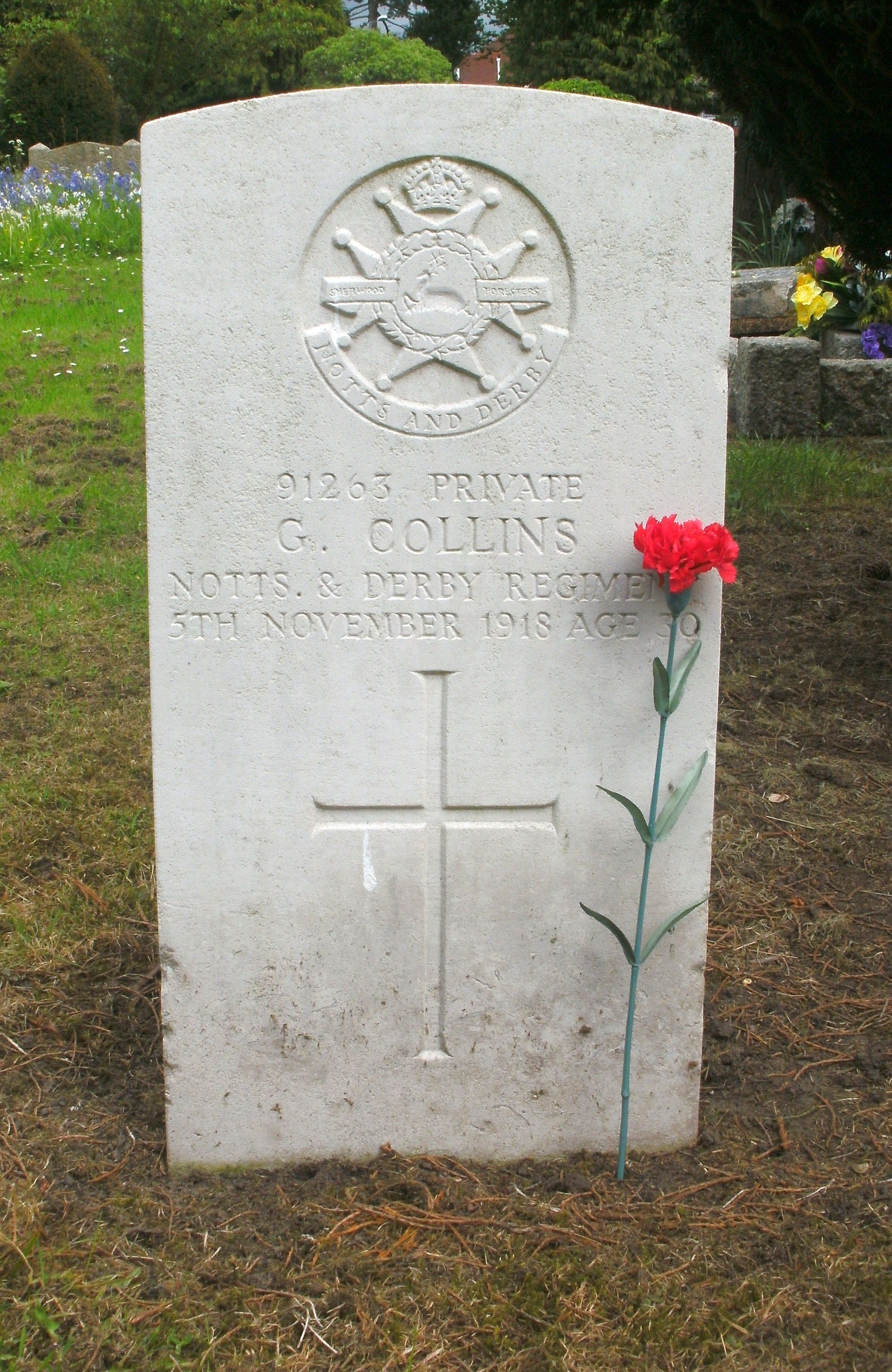
Memorial for G Collins of the Sherwood Foresters, giving the full title of the regiment

Following the amalgamation, the 1st Battalion Sherwood Foresters saw action in Egypt during the Anglo-Egyptian War, and was stationed at Malta from September 1898. Following the outbreak of the Second Boer War in October 1899, the battalion was sent to South Africa where they arrived in December. They were stationed in the Orange Free State and took part in fighting under General Sir William Gatacre. From April 1900 they were part of the 21st Infantry brigade under General Bruce Hamilton. The battalion stayed in South Africa until the end of the war, then transferred on the SS Wakool to a new posting at Hong Kong in September 1902.

The 2nd Battalion served in India from 1882 to 1898, and saw action in the Sikkim Expedition 1888 and the North West Frontier campaign 1897–1898, after which they transferred to Aden. They were stationed at Malta from February 1900 until returning home in May 1902.

In October 1902, the Nottinghamshire association was made explicit, the name changing to the Sherwood Foresters (Nottinghamshire and Derbyshire Regiment). In 1908, the Militia and Volunteers were reorganised nationally as part of the Haldane Reforms, with the former becoming the Special Reserve (SR) and the latter the Territorial Force (TF); the regiment now had two Reserve battalions and four Territorial battalions.

=== First World War ===
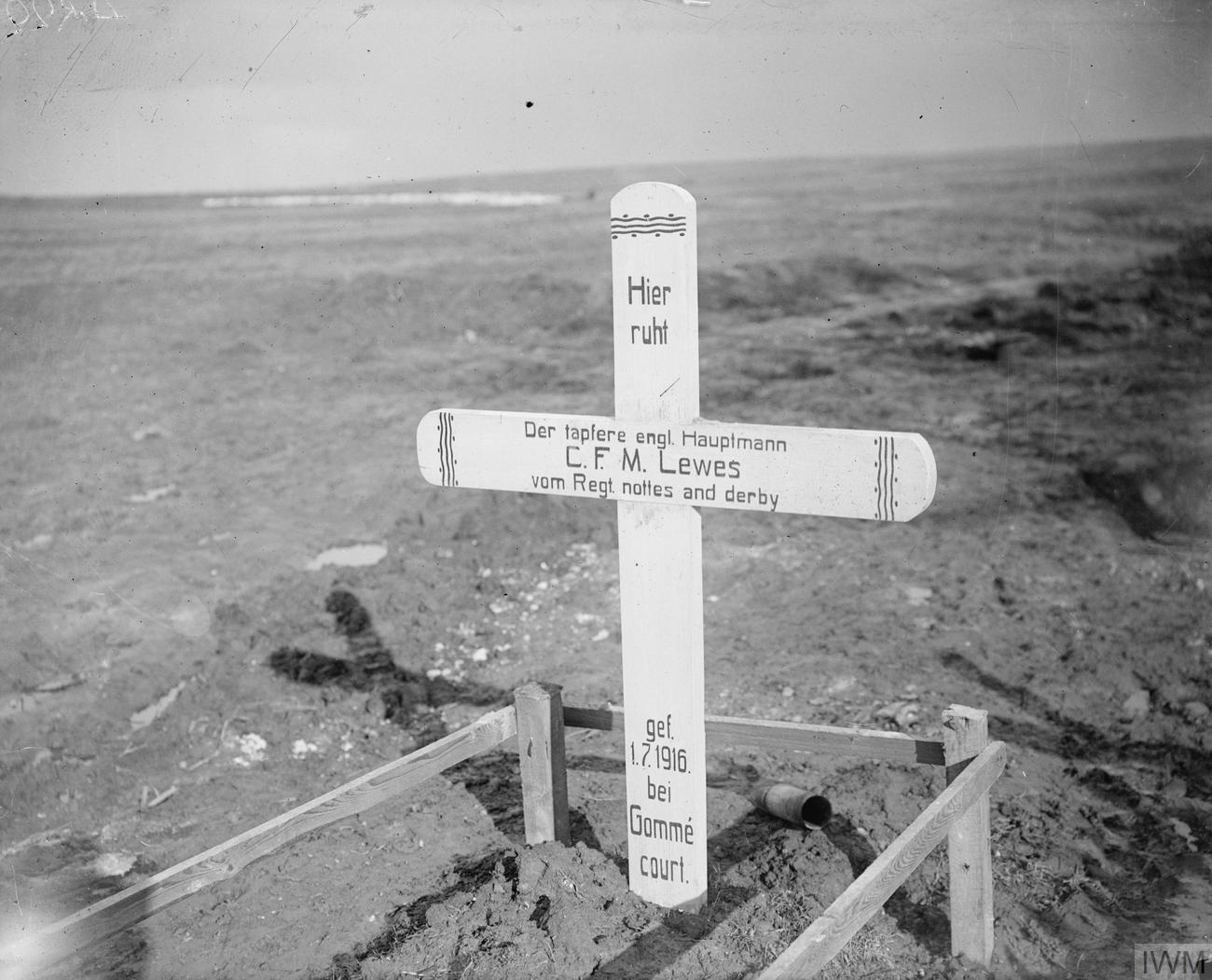
The grave of Captain Frederick Henry Meredith Lewes, Adjutant of 1/5th Battalion, Nottinghamshire and Derbyshire Regiment, erected by the Germans at Gommecourt, where he was killed on 1 July 1916. Photograph taken in March 1917

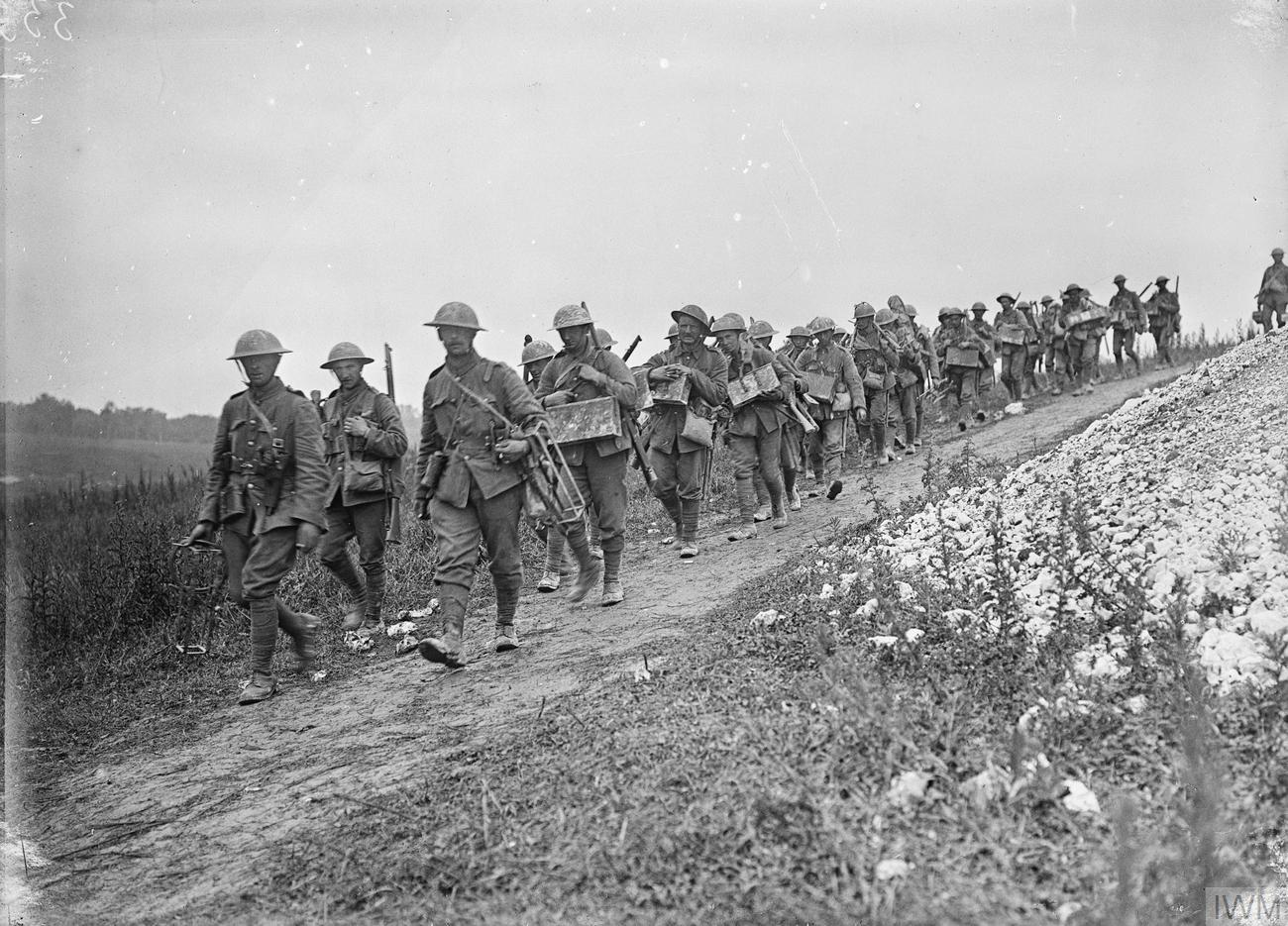
Bomb carrying party of the 1st Battalion, Sherwood Foresters going up to the front line at La Boisselle, France, 6 July 1916.

==== Regular Army ====
The 1st battalion landed at Le Havre as part of the 24th Brigade in the 8th Division in November 1914 for service on the Western Front.

The 2nd battalion landed at Saint-Nazaire as part of 18th Brigade in the 6th Division in September 1914 also for service on the Western Front.

==== Reserve Battalions ====
The 3rd (Reserve) and 4th (Extra Reserve) Battalions were depot/training units. They moved to Plymouth (3rd Battalion) and Sunderland (4th Battalion) in August 1914. In May 1915, the 3rd Battalion joined the 4th in Sunderland, where they both remained as part of Tyne Garrison, as holding and reinforcement units.

==== Territorial Force ====
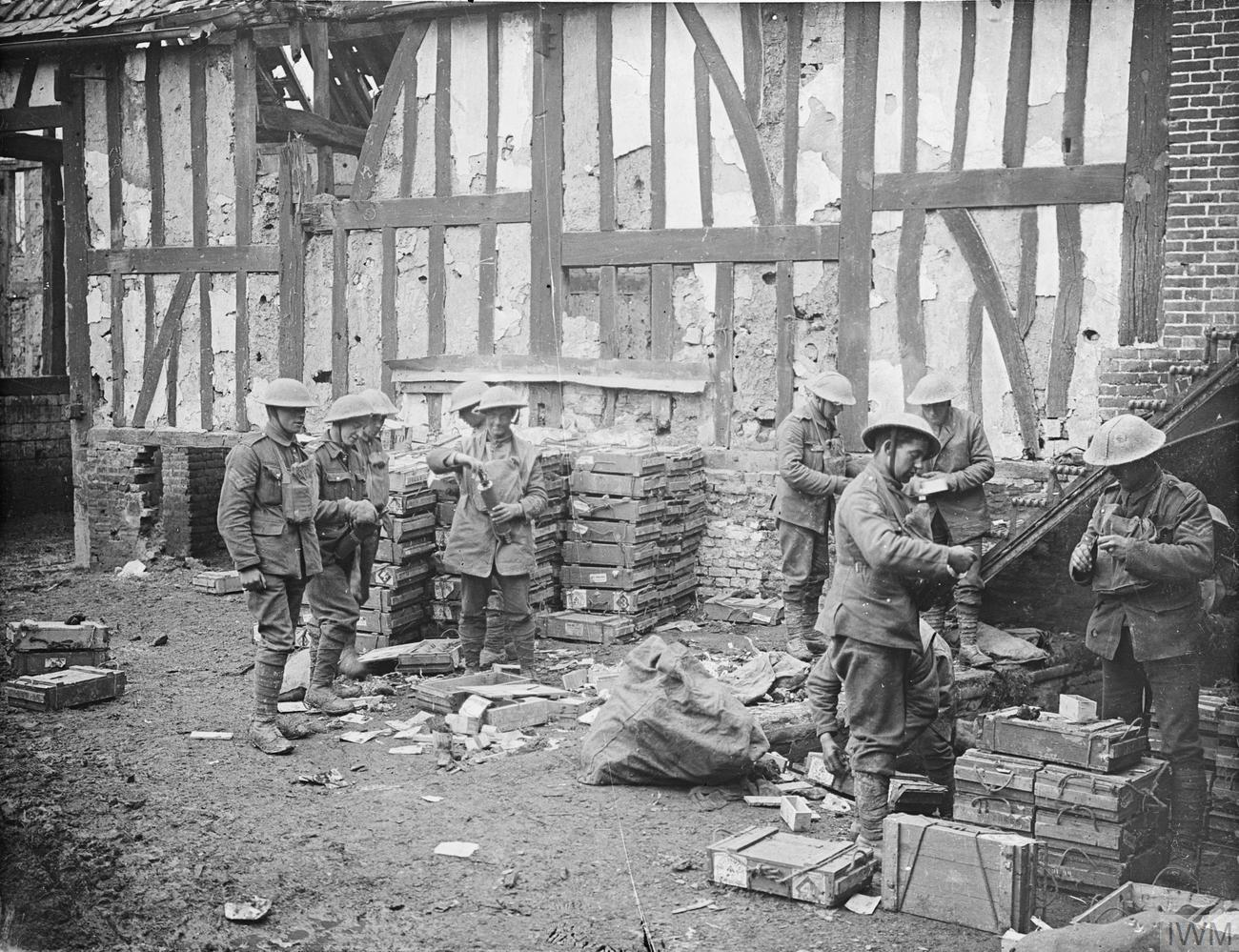
Men of the 1/8th Battalion, Sherwood Foresters, fixing fuses in stokes mortar bombs. Fonquevillers, France, March 1917.

The 1/5th, 1/6th, 1/7th and 1/8th battalions landed in France as part of the Sherwood Foresters Brigade in the North Midland Division (later 139th (Sherwood Foresters) Brigade and 46th (North Midland) Division respectively) in February 1915 for service on the Western Front.

The 2nd-Line TF battalions formed on the outbreak of war, the 2/5th, 2/6th, 2/7th and 2/8th battalions, moved to Ireland as part of the 178th (2/1st Nottinghamshire and Derbyshire) Brigade in the 59th (2nd North Midland) Division in April 1916. During the Easter Rising in Ireland, the 2/7th and 2/8th battalions lost over two hundred men killed or wounded at Mount Street on 26 April and at the South Dublin Union on 27 April. The 2/5th, 2/7th and the 2/8th battalions transferred to Le Havre in February 1917 for service on the Western Front while the 2/6th battalion transferred to Boulogne-sur-Mer in February 1917 also for service on the Western Front.

3rd-Line TF battalions (3/5th, 3/6th, 3/7th and 3/8th) were also formed to train drafts for the battalions overseas.

The 21st Battalion was formed from Home Service men of the TF.

==== New Armies ====
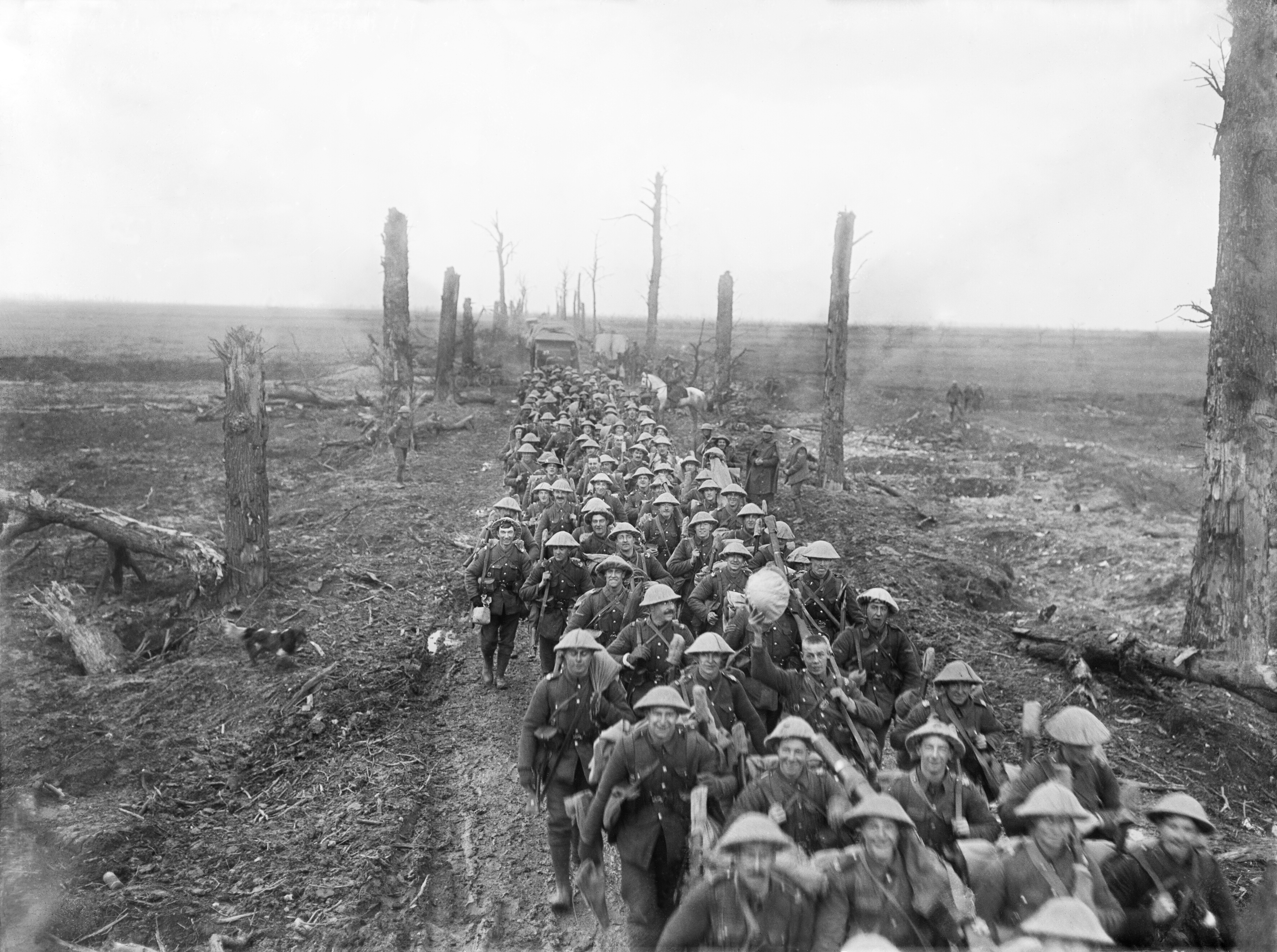
Men of the Sherwood Foresters following up the Germans near Brie, March 1917.

The 9th (Service) Battalion landed at Suvla Bay as part of the 33rd Brigade in the 11th (Northern) Division in August 1915; it was evacuated from Gallipoli to Egypt in December 1915 and then moved to France in July 1916 for service on the Western Front.

The 10th (Service) Battalion landed at Boulogne-sur-Mer as part of the 51st Brigade in the 17th (Northern) Division in July 1915 also for service on the Western Front.

The 11th (Service) Battalion landed at Boulogne-sur-Mer as part of the 70th Brigade in the 23rd Division in August 1915 before transferring to Italy in November 1917 and then to France in September 1918.

The 12th (Service) Battalion (Pioneers) landed in France as pioneer battalion for the 24th Division in August 1915 for service on the Western Front.

The 15th (Service) Battalion (Nottingham) (a 'Bantam battalion') landed in France as part of the 105th Brigade in the 35th Division in February 1916 also for service on the Western Front.

The 16th (Service) Battalion (Chatsworth Rifles), which had been formed by the Duke of Devonshire, and the 17th (Service) Battalion (Welbeck Rangers), which had been formed by the Lord Mayor of Nottingham, both landed at Le Havre as part of the 117th Brigade in the 39th Division in March 1916 also for service on the Western Front.

There were other short-lived New Army battalions of the regiment: the 13th and 14th (Service) (later (Reserve)) Battalions, the 18th (Service) Battalion (another Bantam unit), the 19th (Reserve) Battalion and the 20th (Labour) Battalion.

=== Between the wars ===
In 1920, Sherwood Foresters were in Flensburg-Mürwik at the Naval Academy Mürwik to supervise the elections to the Schleswig plebiscites.

In December 1936, the 46th (North Midland) Division was disbanded and its headquarters was reconstituted as 2nd Anti-Aircraft Division to control the increasing number of anti-aircraft (AA) units being created north of London. At the same time, several of its infantry battalions were converted into searchlight battalions of the Royal Engineers (RE). The 6th and 7th Bns Sherwood Foresters were among these, becoming 40th (The Sherwood Foresters) Anti-Aircraft Battalion and 42nd (The Robin Hoods, Sherwood Foresters) AA Bn respectively, forming part of 32nd (South Midland) Anti-Aircraft Group in 2 AA Division.

=== Second World War ===
After garrison service in the interwar years, the Sherwood Foresters next saw action in the Second World War. The regiment served in the Norwegian Campaign, the Battle of France, Dunkirk, the North African and the Italian campaigns. They also saw action in the Far East. Nearly 27,000 men served in the regiment's 17 battalions, suffering 1,500 officers and men killed in action. The regiment won 10 battle honours and 400 decorations, including a Victoria Cross. Other battalions saw service in Italy and North Africa.

==== 1st Battalion ====
The 1st Battalion was serving in the Middle Eastern theatre and fought in the North African Campaign and the Western Desert Campaign on the outbreak of war, and was assigned to many different brigades and divisions until late June 1942 when, fighting in Tobruk, the battalion was captured. The few survivors of the battalion returned to the United Kingdom. In September the 1st Battalion was reformed, by the redesignation of the 16th Battalion, a hostilities-only battalion. In August 1944 the new 1st Battalion was transferred to the 183rd Infantry Brigade, part of the 61st Infantry Division and in June 1945 it transferred to the 184th Infantry Brigade, again part of 61st Infantry Division.

==== 2nd Battalion ====
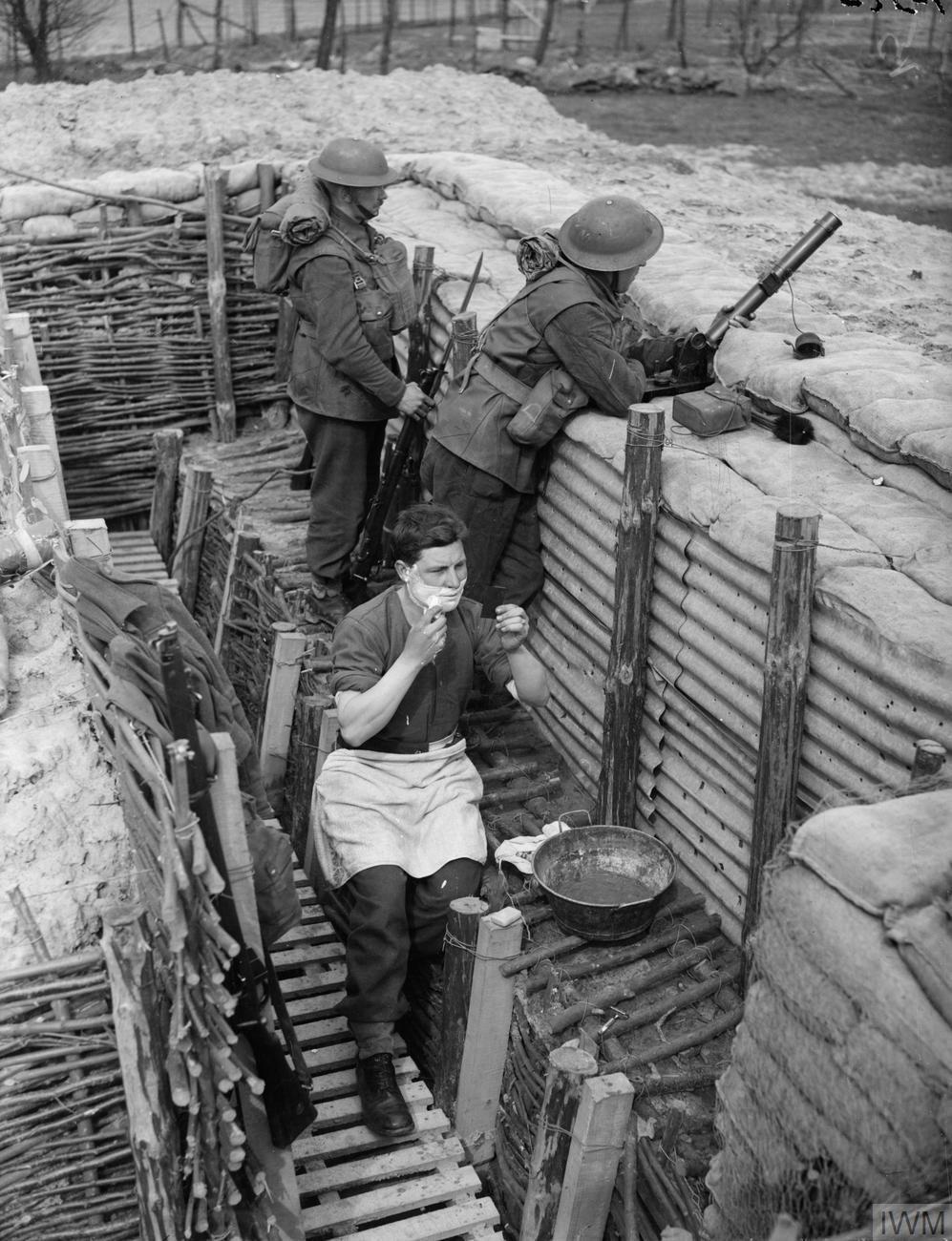
Men of 'D' Company of the 2nd Battalion, Sherwood Foresters in a forward trench near Roches, 1 April 1940. Lance Corporal L. J. Harris has a shave while other men keep watch, one armed with a 2-inch mortar.

The 2nd Battalion, Sherwood Foresters was serving in the 3rd Infantry Brigade, part of the 1st Infantry Division, with which the battalion would remain with throughout the war. The division was sent to France in September 1939 shortly after the outbreak of the war, joining the British Expeditionary Force (BEF). The battalion remained in France until May 1940 when the Germans invaded the Low Countries. They took part in the short but bitter fighting and were forced to be evacuated at Dunkirk as the BEF was in danger of being surrounded and overrun. They were evacuated to England and spent the next two years on home defence and in preparation for a German invasion which never arrived. In early 1943 the division was sent to North Africa where it became part of the British First Army and took part in the final stages of the Tunisian Campaign. In January 1944, they took part in the landings at Anzio, under command of U.S. Fifth Army, where they suffered serious casualties in some of the fiercest fighting of the Italian Campaign so far, and later fighting during Operation Diadem and on the Gothic Line. They fought in Italy until January 1945 when they were sent to Palestine and remained there until the end of the war.

==== 1/5th (Derbyshire) Battalion ====
The 1/5th (Derbyshire) Battalion was a 1st-Line Territorial Army formation originally serving with the 148th Infantry Brigade, part of the 49th (West Riding) Infantry Division. However, in December 1939, the battalion was reassigned to the 25th Infantry Brigade and saw service with the BEF in France and Belgium in 1940 and being evacuated at Dunkirk. In late 1940, it was again reassigned to the 55th Infantry Brigade, 18th Infantry Division. The battalion, along with the rest of the 18th Division, was posted to Malaya to defend the peninsula and the island of Singapore against the Japanese. After Singapore fell to the Imperial Japanese Army, the battalion's men were among the thousands of Prisoners of war sent to work on the infamous Burma Railway.

==== 40th (Sherwood Foresters) Anti-Aircraft Battalion ====
In August 1940, the AA battalions of the Royal Engineers were transferred to the Royal Artillery (RA) and the battalion became 40th (Sherwood Foresters) Searchlight Regiment, RA, serving through the Battle of Britain and The Blitz. In June 1943, it was converted again, becoming the 149th (Sherwood Foresters) Light Anti-Aircraft Regiment, RA and transferred to the 55th (West Lancashire) Infantry Division in Home Forces before joining British Second Army for the Allied invasion of Europe Operation Overlord. The regiment landed in August 1944 and served through the North-West Europe campaign, particularly at the Allied Siege of Dunkirk and the Rhine crossing (Operation Plunder).

==== 42nd (Robin Hoods, Sherwood Foresters) Anti-Aircraft Battalion ====
Similarly, in August 1940 this battalion became the 42nd (Robin Hoods, Sherwood Foresters) Searchlight Regiment, RA, serving through The Blitz in 50th Anti-Aircraft Brigade of 2nd AA Division, covering Derby. It went to North-West Europe and served in the defence of Antwerp against V-1 flying bomb attacks during the winter of 1944–45.

==== 8th Battalion ====
The 8th (Nottinghamshire) Battalion was mobilised in the 148th Infantry Brigade alongside the 1/5th Battalion on the outbreak of war, attached to the 49th (West Riding) Division. It fought in Norway in 1940, and then served as a garrison in Scotland and Northern Ireland. In 1942, the brigade was reorganised as a Training brigade.

==== 2/5th (Derbyshire) Battalion ====
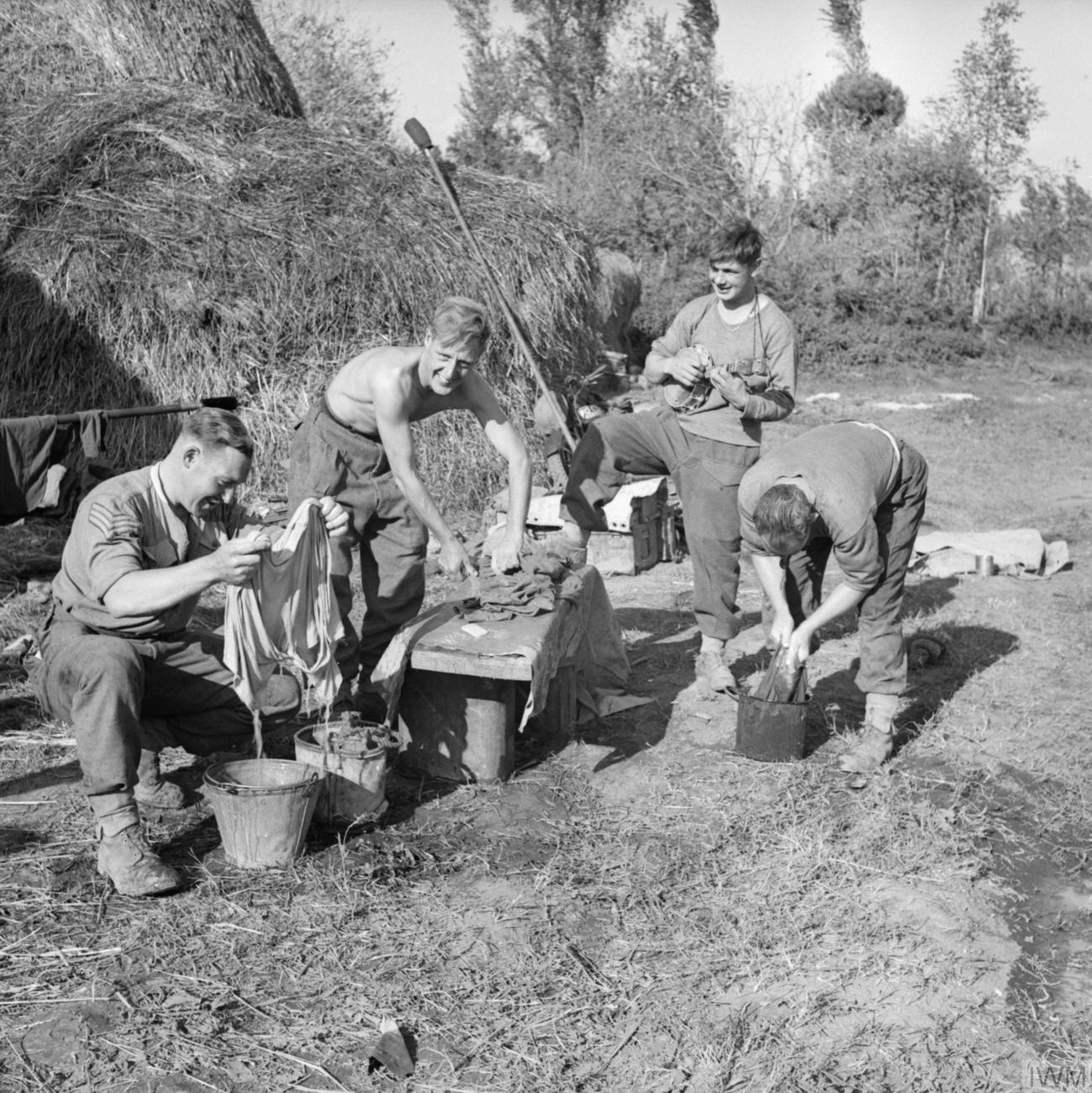
Men of the 5th Battalion, Sherwood Foresters do their washing while out of the line, Italy, 4 November 1943.

The 2/5th (Derbyshire) Battalion was formed as a 2nd-Line duplicate of the 1/5th Battalion, raised in 1939 when the TA was doubled in size. It was renamed the 5th Battalion after the loss of the 1/5th in Malaya in February 1942. It served in the 139th Infantry Brigade, part of the 46th Infantry Division, in France (see 9th Battalion), Tunisia, Italy and Greece.

==== 9th Battalion ====
On the outbreak of the Second World War, the 9th Battalion was in the process of formation as a duplicate of the 8th Battalion. Based at Bulwell near Nottingham, the battalion was commanded by Claude Lancaster, MP, a former officer in the Royal Horse Guards. The battalion was assigned to the 139th Infantry Brigade, alongside the 2/5th (Derbyshire) Battalion and 2/5th Leicestershire Regiment of the 46th Infantry Division, which, like several other '2nd Line' Territorial divisions, went to join the British Expeditionary Force (BEF) in France for training and labour duties in April 1940. However, when the German Army attacked and broke through the following month, 46th Division was sent into action. On 29 May, 139 Brigade joined 'Macforce' holding the canal line near Carvin. As the 'pocket' shrank towards Dunkirk, 46th Division was ordered inside the perimeter on 27 May. On 29 May, 9th Foresters were sent to reinforce the garrison at the fortified town of Bergues, 9 km south of Dunkirk. The Germans were unable to enter Bergues until 2 June, and 9th Foresters was one of the last units to leave Dunkirk and be evacuated from France.

The 9th Battalion left 46th Division in December 1940, and shortly afterwards became the lorried infantry element alongside the artillery of 1st Support Group in 1st Armoured Division. However, on 1 November 1941, the battalion was converted to the armoured car role as 112th Regiment Royal Armoured Corps. In common with other infantry units transferred to the Royal Armoured Corps, personnel would have continued to wear their Foresters cap badge on the black beret of the Royal Armoured Corps, and the regiment continued to add the parenthesis '(Foresters)' after the RAC title. Lieutenant-Colonel Lancaster remained in command during this period before returning to the House of Commons.

112 RAC was assigned to the 42nd Armoured Division as its armoured car regiment. It left the division in February 1943 and later became a draft-finding unit for other armoured car regiments fighting in the Normandy Campaign. 112 RAC ceased to exist on 14 October 1944, when it reverted to the title of 9th Foresters, which was placed in suspended animation. The last entry in the War Diary notes:

The history of this Regiment is a pure example of the complete inefficiency of 'A' Branch at the War Office, in as much as many hundreds of officers and men have wasted valuable years of their lives training for precisely nothing.

==== 10th (Home Defence) Battalion ====
The 10th (Home Defence) Battalion was raised for home defence in 1939 and, like most other home service units, would mainly have had consisted of men with military experience who were too old or medically unfit for active service overseas, or from younger soldiers who themselves were not old enough to be conscripted (the age for conscription being 20 at the time). The battalion was disbanded in 1941.

==== 12th Battalion ====
The 12th Battalion was a hostilities-only unit raised in 1940. In 1942, it was sent to India, where it carried out internal security duties at Delhi. On 1 January 1944, it moved to Delawari and came under the command of the 52nd Infantry Brigade, whose role was training British infantrymen in jungle warfare.

==== 13th Battalion ====
The 13th Battalion was a hostilities-only unit raised in 1940. In 1942, it was sent to India, where it was converted to the armoured role as 163rd Regiment Royal Armoured Corps. In common with other infantry battalions transferred to the Royal Armoured Corps, the personnel of 163 RAC would have continued to wear their Foresters cap badge on the black beret of the Royal Armoured Corps.

163 RAC was stationed at Rawalpindi under command of 267th Indian Armoured Brigade. However, there was a change of policy and, on 1 December 1944 (also reported as 1 December 1943), the regiment was re-converted to infantry, reverting to its previous title of 13th Sherwood Foresters and coming under command of 67th Indian Training Brigade.

==== 14th Battalion ====
The 14th Battalion was a hostilities-only unit raised in 1940 that went on to see active service in the Middle East (Egypt, Palestine, Syria, Lebanon, Iraq) and Italy. It was first assigned to the 218th Independent Infantry Brigade (Home), formed for Home Service in the Yorkshire Area, but was soon reassigned to be the lorried infantry component alongside the artillery of 8th Support Group in the newly raised 8th Armoured Division. In 1942, the division went round by sea to Suez, but, on arrival in July, it was broken up and 14th Foresters were sent to join the 9th Independent Armoured Brigade, with which it fought at the Second Battle of El Alamein under the command of 2nd New Zealand Division.

In January 1943, the 14th Foresters went to join the 7th Armoured Brigade refitting in Persia and Iraq Command. In the summer of 1943, the battalion returned to North Africa to join the 18th Infantry Brigade in the 1st Armoured Division. In February 1944, the brigade sailed to Italy and took part in the Anzio campaign (February–May 1944) under the command of the 1st Infantry Division. In August, the brigade returned to the 1st Armoured Division and was engaged in the operations at Coriano in September. By now, the brigade's infantry battalions were badly depleted and, due to the lack of replacements in the Mediterranean, the 14th Foresters was reduced to a cadre and transferred to the non-operational 168th (London) Infantry Brigade, before being disbanded.

==== 15th (Home Defence) Battalion ====
The 15th Battalion was raised for Home Defence in 1940 and disbanded in 1941.

==== 16th Battalion ====
The 16th Battalion was formed by the re-designation of the 70th (Young Soldiers) Battalion in September 1942. The new 16th battalion transferred to the 162nd Infantry Brigade and later the 222nd Infantry Brigade. On 1 January 1943 the 16th Battalion was re-designated as the 1st Battalion.

==== 70th (Young Soldiers) Battalion ====
In 1940, the 70th (Young Soldiers) Battalion was stationed at Holme Pierrepont Hall, near Radcliffe-on-Trent, Nottingham. Like all other Young Soldiers battalions, this was formed to take volunteers around the ages of 18 and 19 who had not yet reached the compulsory age of conscription, which was 20 at the time. In September 1942, the 70th was redesignated as the 16th Battalion.

=== Post-war activities ===
In 1948, the regiment became part of the Midland Brigade, known as the Forester Brigade from 1958. In the post-war period, the 1st battalion Sherwood Foresters served in Germany, Egypt and Libya. In 1958, the battalion saw action in Malaya and, in 1963, in Cyprus. The 2nd battalion served in Palestine and Germany.

=== Amalgamations ===
In 1970, the Sherwood Foresters were amalgamated with the Worcestershire Regiment to form the Worcestershire and Sherwood Foresters Regiment (29th/45th Foot).

In August 2007, as part of an ongoing series of further amalgamations, the Worcestershire and Sherwood Foresters Regiment became the 2nd Battalion, The Mercian Regiment.

== Regimental museum ==
The Sherwood Foresters Museum is based in Nottingham Castle. Meanwhile, the Derby Museum and Art Gallery incorporates the Soldier's Story Gallery, based on the collections, amongst others, of the Sherwood Foresters.

== Battle honours ==
The regiment's battle honours were as follows:

- post 1881:
  - Egypt (1882), Tirah, South Africa 1899–1902
- First World War:
  - Aisne 1914 & 18, Armentieres 1914, Neuve Chappelle, Aubers, Hooge 1915, Loos, Somme 1916 & 18, Albert 1916 & 18, Bazentin, Delville Wood, Pozieres, Ginchy, Flers-Courcelette, Morval, Thiepval, Le Transloy, Ancre Heights, Ancre 1916, Arras 1917 & 18, Vimy 1917, Scarpe 1917 & 18, Messines 1917, Ypres 1917 & 18, Pilckem, Langemarck 1917, Menin Road, Polygon Wood, Broodseinde, Poelcappelle, Passchendaele, Cambrai 1917 & 18, St Quentin, Baupaume 1917, Rosieres, Villers Brettaneux, Lys, Bailleul, Kemmel, Scherpenberg, Amiens, Drocourt-Queant, Hindenburg Line, Epehy, Canal du Nord, St Quentin Canal, Beaurevoir, Courtrai, Selle, Sambre, France & Flanders 1914 - 18,
  - Piavé, Italy 1917 - 18,
  - Suvla, Landing at Suvla, Schimitar Hill, Gallipoli 1915,
  - Egypt 1916
- Second World War:
  - Norway 1940,
  - St Omer-La Bassée, Ypres-Comines Canal, Dunkirk 1940, North West Europe 1940,
  - Gazala, El Alemain, Djebel Guerba, Tamera, Medejez Plain, Tunis, North Africa 1942 -43,
  - Salerno, Volturno Crossing, Monte Camino, Anzio, Campoleone, Advance to Tiber, Gothic Line, Coriano, Cosina Canal Crossing, Monte Ceco, Italy 1943 - 45,
  - Singapore Island, Malaya 1942

== Victoria Crosses ==
The following members of the regiment were awarded the Victoria Cross:

- Private Bernard McQuirt, Indian Mutiny
- Lieutenant (later Captain) Henry Singleton Pennell, Tirah Campaign
- Private (later Corporal) William Bees, Second Boer War
- Corporal (later Captain) Harry Churchill Beet, Second Boer War
- Corporal (later Sergeant) Ernest Albert Egerton, First World War
- Acting Corporal (later Sergeant) Fred Greaves, First World War
- Captain (Temporary Lt-Col, later Major-General)) Charles Edward Hudson, First World War
- Sergeant William Henry Johnson (VC), First World War
- Private Jacob Rivers, First World War
- Corporal James Upton, First World War
- Captain (Acting Lt-Col) Bernard William Vann, First World War
- Second Lieutenant (Temporary Captain, later Colonel) Charles Geoffrey Vickers, First World War
- Lieutenant (Temporary Captain) Albert Ball, First World War
- Lieutenant (Temporary Captain) John Henry Cound Brunt, Second World War

== Regimental Colonels ==
Colonels of the regiment were:

- 1881–: (1st Battalion): Gen. Henry Cooper (ex 45th Foot)
- 1881-?1889: (2nd Battalion): Gen. John Studholme Brownrigg, CB (ex 95th Foot)
- 188n–?: (1st Battalion): Gen. Sir Daniel Lysons, GCB (ex 45th Foot)
- 1898–1900: Gen. Frederic Augustus Thesiger, 2nd Baron Chelmsford, GCB, GCVO
- 1900–1902: Gen. Sir Mark Walker, VC, KCB
- 1902–1905: Lt-Gen. Sir William Bellairs, KCMG, CB
- 1905–1930: Gen. Sir Horace Lockwood Smith-Dorrien, GCB, GCMG, DSO
- 1930–1935: Lt-Gen. Sir William Raine Marshall, GCMG, KCB, KCSI
- 1935–1941: Maj-Gen. Sir Frederick Barton Maurice, KCMG, CB
- 1941–1946: Lt-Gen. Sir Douglas Studholme Brownrigg Wellesley, KCB, DSO
- 1946–1947: Lt-Gen. Sir Henry Beresford Dennitts Willcox, KCIE, CB, DSO, MC
- 1947–1958: Maj-Gen. Percival Napier White, CB, CBE
- 1958–1965: Maj-Gen. Cecil Benfield Fairbanks, CB, CBE
- 1965–1970: Brig. James Henry Maunsell Hackett, DSO (to The Worcestershire and Sherwood Foresters Regiment (29th/45th Foot))
- 1970: Regiment amalgamated with Worcestershire Regiment to form The Worcestershire and Sherwood Foresters Regiment (29th/45th Foot))

== Memorial ==
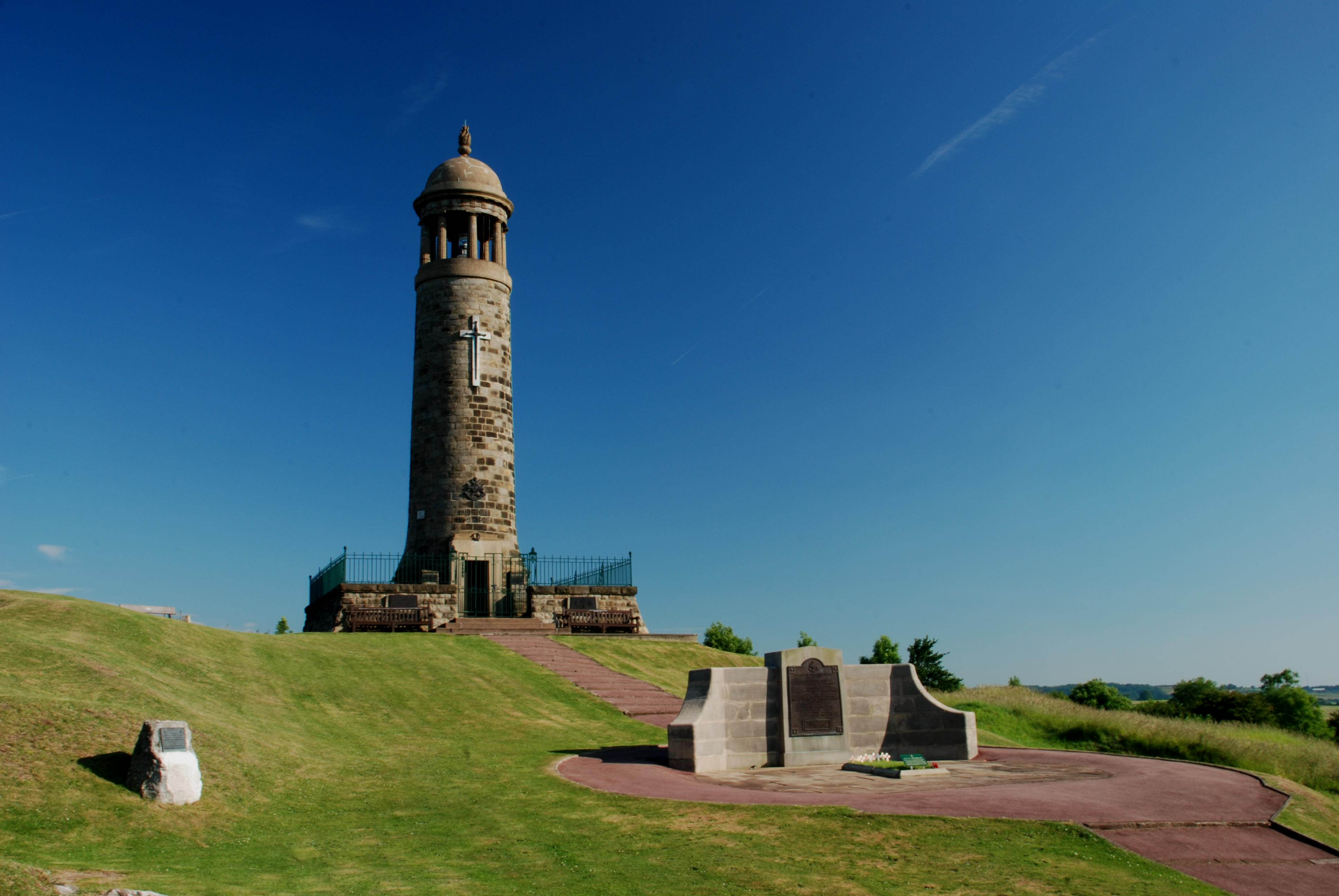
Crich Stand

A Memorial Tower, for those of the regiment who died in battle, was erected in 1923 at the summit of Crich Stand in the Derbyshire village of Crich. Built on the site of an older tower, the Memorial Tower is the destination of an annual pilgrimage on the first Sunday in July. It is 1,000 feet (300 m) above sea level, and has 52 steps to the top. From there eight counties can be seen, including landmarks such as the Humber Bridge and Lincoln Cathedral.

== Alliances ==
In 1931, the Sherwood Foresters were officially allied with the Simcoe Foresters (35th Regiment of Infantry), Canadian Militia. In 1936, the Simcoe Foresters amalgamated with the Grey Regiment (31st Regiment of Infantry) to become the present-day The Grey and Simcoe Foresters (G&SF), Canadian Army. The Sherwood Foresters' badge was suitably modified ("Canadianised") and adopted as the G&SF badge. In 1970, with the Sherwood and Worcestershire amalgamation, Her Majesty The Queen graciously granted the continuation this alliance, and again in 2007 with the WFR/Stafford/Chester amalgamation. The G&SF Regimental Colour has a Sherwood Foresters Lincoln green facing, Lincoln green over hunting scarlet (maroon) are its colours, and the Sherwood Foresters regimental tie is that of the G&SF (purchased from the association). in 1977, Her Majesty The Queen appointed Her Royal Highness The Princess Royal as Colonel-in-Chief of The Grey & Simcoe Foresters.

== East Midlands Universities Officer Training Corps ==
The Sherwood Foresters' stable belt continues to be used by the East Midlands Universities Officer Training Corps.

== Uniforms ==
The formal regimental colours were chocolate and green. As the 45th Regiment of Foot, the regiment initially had deep green facings on the lapels, cuffs and lining of the red coats of the 18th century. Lincoln green was subsequently adopted in recognition of its unique title. When merged with the 95th Regiment in 1881, the Sherwood Foresters adopted the standard white facings of non-royal English line infantry regiments. The historic lincoln green was restored in 1913. In other respects the regiment followed the normal progression of the British infantry from red coats, to scarlet tunics, to khaki service dress and battledress. Officers had silver lace on their coats until 1830, after which gold braiding was adopted.

== See also ==
- Sherwood Foresters F.C.
