= Normanton Barracks =

- Derby
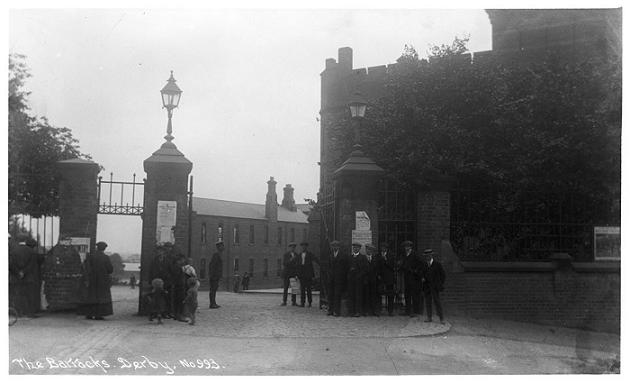
- Normanton Barracks

Site information
- Type: Barracks
- Owner: Ministry of Defence
- Operator: British Army

Location
- Location within Derbyshire
- Coordinates: 52.89691°N 1.47784°W

Site history
- Built: 1874–1877
- Built for: War Office
- In use: 1877–1963

Garrison information
- Occupants: Sherwood Foresters

Normanton Barracks was a military installation in Normanton, Derby, England.

== History ==
The barracks were built in the Fortress Gothic Revival Style between 1874 and 1877. Their creation took place as part of the Cardwell Reforms which encouraged the localisation of British military forces. The barracks became the depot for the 54th (West Norfolk) Regiment of Foot and the 95th (Derbyshire) Regiment of Foot. Following the Childers Reforms, the 45th Regiment of Foot (Sherwood Foresters) amalgamated with the 95th (Derbyshire) Regiment of Foot to form the Sherwood Foresters with its depot in the barracks in 1881.

Many reservists enlisted at the barracks at the start of the First World War. During the Second World War the barracks were significantly expanded. However they were demoted to the status of out-station to the Forester Brigade depot at Glen Parva Barracks in 1958 and decommissioned in 1963. The Sherwood Foresters Regimental Museum moved to Nottingham Castle in 1965 and the barracks were then demolished in 1981. The site is now occupied by Foresters Leisure Park.
