= Derby (constituency) =

UK Parliamentary constituency, 1801–1950

- Former borough constituency for the House of Commons

1295–1950 (split)
- Seats: two
- Replaced by: Derby North and Derby South

Derby is a former United Kingdom Parliamentary constituency. It was a constituency of the House of Commons of the Parliament of England, then of the Parliament of Great Britain from 1707 to 1800 and of the Parliament of the United Kingdom from 1801 to 1950. It was represented by two members of parliament. It was divided into the single-member constituencies of Derby North and Derby South in 1950.

== History ==
Derby regularly sent two representatives to Parliament from Edward I's reign. In 1900 it was one of the first two constituencies to elect a member from the then newly formed Labour Party, along with Merthyr Tydfil.

In 1950 the constituency was abolished and replaced by the two single-member constituencies of Derby North and Derby South.

== Boundaries ==
1885–1918: The existing parliamentary borough, and so much of the municipal borough of Derby as was not already included in the parliamentary borough.

== Members of Parliament ==
=== 1294–1640 ===
Parliament	First member	Second member	
1294	William de la Cornere	Randalph Makeneye	
1297	William Bourne de Derby	Nicklos de Lorimer	
1299	Nicklos de Lorimer	Gervase de Derby	
1301	Gervase de Wilnye	Adam le Rede	
1304	John de la Corne	Richard Cardoyl	
1305	John de Chaddesdon	Gervase de Wileyne	
1306	Hugh Alibon	Peter la Chapman	
1307	John Chaddesdon	Gervase de Wilney	
1310	Henry Alwaston	Thomas de Stade	
1311	Thomas del Sted	Henry Bindetton	
1312	Geffry de Leycestre	Robert de Breydsale	
1313	John Fitz John	Henry Lomb	
1314	Adam le Rede	William de Aleby	
1314	William de Aleby	Adam le Rede	
1318	Simon de Chester	Richard Breddon	
1318	Alexander de Holand	John de Weston	
1325	Henry le Carpenter	John Fitz Richard	
1327	John Fitz Gilbert	Ferhun Tutbury	
1328	Simon de Chester	John Collings	
1328	Thomas Tulaxbar	Geffry Snayth	
1330	Simon de Nottingham	John de Weston	
1333	Hugh Allibon	John Gibbonson	
1334	John Gibbonson	?	
1335	Nicholas Langford	John Fitz Thomas	
1336	Simon de Chester	John Gibbonson	
1337	John Fitz William	Thomas Tuttebury	
1338	William de Derby	John Hache	Robert Allibon
1338	William de Derby	Robert de Weston	
1338	Simon de Chester	Robert Allibon	
1338	Henry del Howe	Robert Saundry	
1339	Alexander Holland	John Weston	
1339	John Gibbonson	Thomas Preston	
1339	Thomas Tutbury	Thomas Thurmondsley	
1341	Thomas de Tutbury	Thomas Derby	
1341	Richard de Trowell	Peter de Quarndon	
1342	Simon de Nottingham	Thomas de Derby	
1344	William de Nottingham	Simon de Chester	
1348	William de Chaddesdon	Thomas de Tutbury	
1350	William Gilbert	John de Chaddesdon	
1351	Thomas Tutbury	William de Derby	
1354	William Chester	Richard Chelford	
1355	Thomas Tutbury	Henry Diddound	
1355	Edmund Toucher	John Bech	
1356	William Ennington	William Nayle	
1358	William de Chester	William Nayle	
1361	Peter Prentice	William de Rossington	
1362	Peter Prentice	William de Rossington	
1363	John Trowell	John Weeke	
1364	John Bradon	Robert Allibon	
1365	William Chester	John Gilbert	
1366	John Berd	William Sese	
1369	John de Brakkerley	William Glasyere	
1370	John Preest	John de Brakkerley	
1372	John Trowell	?	
1373	William Chester	John Gilbert	
1374	William Pakeman	Roger Allibon	
1377	William Groos	John de Berdee	
1378	John Hay	Richard de Trowell	
1378	Henry Flanstead	Roger Allibon	
1379	Richard Dell	Roger Ashe	
1382	Thomas Toppeleyse	John Hay	
1383	William Pakeman	John Bowyer	
1383	Richard de Trowell	John Gibbon	
1384	Richard Sherman	John de Stockes	
1385	Richard Trowell	John Dell	
1386	John Stokkes	John Prentice I	
1388 (Feb)	William Pakeman	Thomas Tappely	
1388 (Sep)	William Pakeman	Hugh Adam	
1390 (Jan)	John Stokkes	John Hay	
1390 (Nov)			
1391	Richard Sherman	Thomas Docking	
1393	John Stokkes	Richard Trowell	
1394			
1395	John Stokkes	William Groos	
1397 (Jan)	William Groos	Thomas Shore	
1397 (Sep)	William Groos	Thomas Shore	
1399	John Stokkes	Thomas Docking	
1401			
1402	Elias Stokkes	Richard Trowell	
1404 (Jan)			
1404 (Oct)	John Prentice II	John Stokkes	
1406	Thomas Goldsmith	John Fairclough	
1407			
1410			
1411	John Brasier	Thomas Shore	
1413 (Feb)			
1413 (May)	Elias Stokkes		
1414 (Apr)	John Prentice II	Robert Bolton	
1414 (Nov)	Elias Stokkes	Thomas Ridgeway	
1415
1416 (Mar)	Elias Stokkes	Roger Wolley	
1416 (Oct)			
1417	Robert Ireland	Thomas Steppingstones	
1419	John Sparham	Ralph Shore	
1420	Richard Brown	Robert Smith	
1421 (May)	Ralph Shore	Thomas Stokkes	
1421 (Dec)	Ralph Shore	John Spicer	
1422	John Stokes	John Barker	
1423	John de Both	Elias Dell	
1424	John Stokes	Elias Dell	
1425	Roger Wolley	Henry Crabbe	
1427	Nicholas Meysham	John de Stokkys	
1429	John de Bath	Elias Stokkys	
1430	Thomas Stokkes	Robert Smith	
1432	John Booth	Robert Sutton	
1434	John Bothe	Thomas Stokeys	
1436	Thomas Stokks	Elias Tildesley	
1441	Thomas Stokkys	Henry Spicer	
1446	Thomas Chatley	Robert Mundy	
1448	Thomas Chatterley	John Spicer	
1449	Richard Chitterley	Thomas Chitterley	
1450	Thomas Acard	Thomas Bradshawe	
1454	John Bird	Edward Lovel	
1459	John Bird	William Hunter	
1468	Thomas Bakynton	Thomas Allestre	
1473	John Newton	Roger Wilkinson	
1478	John Briddle	John Newton	
1510–1523	No names known		
1529	Thomas Ward	Henry Ainsworth	
1536	?		
1539	?		
1542	Thomas Sutton	William Allestry	
1545	Thomas Sutton	William Allestry	
1547	Thomas Sutton	Robert Ragg	
1553 (Mar)	Robert Ragg	William Allestry	
1553 (Oct)	Thomas Sutton	George Cherneley	
1554 (Apr)	William Allestry	George Stringer	
1554 (Nov)	William More	William Bainbridge	
1555	Richard Ward	William Allestry	
1558	James Thatcher	William Bainbridge	
1558–9	Richard Doughty	William Bainbridge	
1562–3	William More	William Bainbridge	
1571	Robert Stringer	William Bainbridge	
1572	Robert Stringer	Tristram Tyrwhitt, expelled and repl. 1576 by Robert Bainbridge	
1584	Sir Henry Beaumont	William Botham	
1586 (Sep)	William Botham	Robert Bainbridge	
1588–9	Richard Fletcher	William Botham	
1593	Robert Stringer	William Botham	
1597	Henry Duport	Robert Stringer	
1601 (Oct)	Peter Eure	John Baxter	
1604–1611	John Baxter	Edward Sleighe	
1614	Gilbert Kniveton	Arthur Turnor	
1621–1622	Timothy Leeving	Edward Leech	
1624	Timothy Leeving	Sir Edward Leech	
1625	Timothy Leeving	Sir Edward Leech	
1626	Sir Henry Crofts	John Thoroughgood	
1628–1629	Philip Mainwaring	Timothy Leeving	
1629–1640	No Parliaments summoned		

=== 1640–1950 ===
Sir William Harcourt

Year	First member	First party	Second member	Second party
November 1640	William Allestry	Royalist	Nathaniel Hallowes	Parliamentarian
October 1643	Allestry disabled to sit – seat vacant		Nathaniel Hallowes	Parliamentarian
1645	Thomas Gell		Nathaniel Hallowes	Parliamentarian
December 1648	Gell excluded in Pride's Purge – seat vacant		Nathaniel Hallowes	Parliamentarian
1653	Derby was unrepresented in the Barebones Parliament			
1654	Gervase Bennet		Derby had only one seat in the First and Second Parliaments of the Protectorate	
January 1659	Gervase Bennet		John Dalton	
May 1659	Nathaniel Hallowes		One seat vacant	
April 1660	Roger Allestry		John Dalton	
1665	Anchitell Grey		John Dalton	
1679	Anchitell Grey		George Vernon	
1685	William Allestry		John Coke	
1689	Anchitell Grey		John Coke	
1690	Anchitell Grey		Robert Wilmot	
1695	Lord Henry Cavendish		John Bagnold	
1698	Lord Henry Cavendish		George Vernon	
1701	Lord James Cavendish		Sir Charles Pye	
1701	Lord James Cavendish		John Harpur	
1702	Thomas Stanhope		John Harpur	
1705	Lord James Cavendish		Sir Thomas Parker	Whig
1710	Lord James Cavendish		Richard Pye	
1710	Sir Richard Levinge		John Harpur	
1711	Edward Mundy		John Harpur	
1713	Edward Mundy		Nathaniel Curzon	
1715	Lord James Cavendish		William Stanhope	Whig
1722	Lord James Cavendish		Thomas Bayley	
1727	Lord James Cavendish		William Stanhope	Whig
1730	Lord James Cavendish		Charles Stanhope	
1736	Lord James Cavendish		John Stanhope	
1742	Viscount Duncannon		John Stanhope	
1748	Viscount Duncannon		Thomas Rivett	
1754	Lord Frederick Cavendish	Whig	George Venables-Vernon	
1762	Lord Frederick Cavendish	Whig	William Fitzherbert	
1772	Lord Frederick Cavendish	Whig	Wenman Coke	Whig
1775	Lord Frederick Cavendish	Whig	John Gisborne	Whig
1776	Lord Frederick Cavendish	Whig	Daniel Coke	Tory
1780	Lord George Cavendish	Whig	Edward Coke	Whig
1797	George Walpole	Whig	Edward Coke	Whig
1806	William Cavendish	Whig	Edward Coke	Whig
1807	William Cavendish	Whig	Thomas Coke	Whig
1807	William Cavendish	Whig	Edward Coke	Whig
1812	Henry Cavendish	Whig	Edward Coke	Whig
1818	Henry Cavendish	Whig	Thomas William Coke	Whig
1826	Henry Cavendish	Whig	Samuel Crompton	Whig
1830	Henry Cavendish	Whig	Edward Strutt	Whig
1835	John Ponsonby	Whig	Edward Strutt	Whig
1847	Hon. Frederick Leveson-Gower	Whig	Edward Strutt	Whig
1848	Michael Thomas Bass	Radical	Lawrence Heyworth	Radical
1852	Michael Thomas Bass	Radical	Thomas Horsfall	Conservative
1853	Michael Thomas Bass	Radical	Lawrence Heyworth	Radical
1857	Michael Thomas Bass	Radical	Samuel Beale	Radical
1859	Michael Thomas Bass	Liberal	Samuel Beale	Liberal
1865	Michael Thomas Bass	Liberal	William Thomas Cox	Conservative
1868	Michael Thomas Bass	Liberal	Samuel Plimsoll	Liberal
1880	Michael Thomas Bass	Liberal	Sir William Vernon-Harcourt	Liberal
1883	Thomas Roe	Liberal	Sir William Vernon-Harcourt	Liberal
1895	Sir Henry Howe Bemrose	Conservative	Geoffrey Drage	Conservative
1900	Sir Thomas Roe	Liberal	Richard Bell	Labour
1904	Sir Thomas Roe	Liberal	Richard Bell	Liberal
1910	Sir Thomas Roe	Liberal	J. H. Thomas	Labour
1916	Sir William Job Collins	Liberal	J. H. Thomas	Labour
1918	Albert Green	Conservative	J. H. Thomas	Labour
1922	Charles Roberts	Liberal	J. H. Thomas	Labour
1923	William Raynes	Labour	J. H. Thomas	Labour
1924	Sir Richard Luce	Conservative	J. H. Thomas	Labour
1929	William Raynes	Labour	J. H. Thomas	Labour
1931	William Allan Reid	Conservative	J. H. Thomas	National Labour
1936	William Allan Reid	Conservative	Philip Noel-Baker	Labour
1945	Clifford Wilcock	Labour	Philip Noel-Baker	Labour
1950	Constituency split into North and South seats			

== Elections ==
=== Elections in the 1830s ===
General election 1830: Derby (2 seats)
Party	Candidate	Votes	%	±%
Whig	Henry Cavendish	Unopposed		
Whig	Edward Strutt	Unopposed		
Registered electors		c. 650		
Whig hold				
Whig hold				

General election 1831: Derby (2 seats)
Party	Candidate	Votes	%	±%
Whig	Henry Cavendish	Unopposed		
Whig	Edward Strutt	Unopposed		
Registered electors		c. 650		
Whig hold				
Whig hold				

General election 1832: Derby (2 seats)
Party	Candidate	Votes	%	±%
Whig	Edward Strutt	884	43.5	N/A
Whig	Henry Cavendish	716	35.3	N/A
Tory	Charles Henry Colvile	430	21.2	New
Majority		286	14.1	N/A
Turnout		1,136	82.1	N/A
Registered electors		1,384		
Whig hold		Swing	N/A	
Whig hold		Swing	N/A	

General election 1835: Derby (2 seats)
Party	Candidate	Votes	%	±%
Whig	Edward Strutt	903	42.0	−1.5
Whig	John Ponsonby	724	33.6	−1.7
Conservative	Francis Curzon	525	24.4	+3.2
Majority		199	9.2	−4.9
Turnout		c. 1,076	c. 72.8	c. +9.3
Registered electors		1,478		
Whig hold		Swing	−1.6	
Whig hold		Swing	−1.7	

General election 1837: Derby (2 seats)
Party	Candidate	Votes	%	±%
Whig	Edward Strutt	836	32.1	−9.9
Whig	John Ponsonby	791	30.3	−3.3
Conservative	Francis Curzon	525	20.1	+7.9
Conservative	Charles Robert Colvile	456	17.5	+5.3
Majority		266	10.2	+1.0
Turnout		1,318	75.3	c. +2.5
Registered electors		1,751		
Whig hold		Swing	−8.3	
Whig hold		Swing	−5.0	

=== Elections in the 1840s ===
General election 1841: Derby (2 seats)
Party	Candidate	Votes	%	±%
Whig	Edward Strutt	875	39.0	+6.9
Whig	John Ponsonby	784	34.9	+4.6
Conservative	Edward Sacheverell Chandos Pole	587	26.1	−11.5
Majority		197	8.8	−1.4
Turnout		1,377	72.2	−3.1
Registered electors		1,906		
Whig hold		Swing	+6.3	
Whig hold		Swing	+5.2	

Strutt was appointed Chief Commissioner of Railways, requiring a by-election.

By-election, 4 September 1846: Derby
Party	Candidate	Votes	%	±%
Whig	Edward Strutt	835	59.9	−14.0
Conservative	Digby Mackworth	559	40.1	+14.0
Majority		276	19.8	+11.0
Turnout		1,394	68.9	−3.3
Registered electors		2,022		
Whig hold		Swing	−14.0	

Ponsonby succeeded to the peerage, becoming 5th Earl of Bessborough, causing a by-election.

By-election, 16 June 1847: Derby
Party	Candidate	Votes	%	±%
Whig	Frederick Leveson-Gower	Unopposed		
Whig hold				

General election 1847: Derby (2 seats)
Party	Candidate	Votes	%	±%
Whig	Edward Strutt	881	31.8	−7.2
Whig	Frederick Leveson-Gower	852	30.8	−4.1
Conservative	Henry Raikes	820	29.6	+3.5
Chartist	Philip McGrath	216	7.8	New
Majority		32	1.2	−7.6
Turnout		1,385	63.6	−8.6
Registered electors		2,177		
Whig hold		Swing	−4.5	
Whig hold		Swing	−2.9	

The election was declared void on petition due to bribery and treating by Strutt's and Leveson-Gower's agents, and the writ suspended in March 1848, later causing a by-election.

By-election, 2 September 1848: Derby (2 seats)
Party	Candidate	Votes	%	±%
Radical	Michael Thomas Bass	956	28.1	−3.7
Radical	Lawrence Heyworth	912	26.8	−4.0
Conservative	James William Freshfield	778	22.8	+8.0
Conservative	James Lord	760	22.3	+7.5
Majority		134	4.0	N/A
Turnout		1,703 (est)	78.2 (est)	+14.6
Registered electors		2,177		
Radical gain from Whig		Swing	−5.7	
Radical gain from Whig		Swing	−5.9	

=== Elections in the 1850s ===
General election 1852: Derby (2 seats)
Party	Candidate	Votes	%	±%
Radical	Michael Thomas Bass	1,252	38.0	+6.2
Conservative	Thomas Horsfall	1,025	31.1	+1.5
Radical	Lawrence Heyworth	1,018	30.9	+0.1
Turnout		2,160 (est)	88.2 (est)	+24.6
Registered electors		2,448		
Majority		227	6.9	N/A
Radical gain from Whig		Swing	+2.7	
Majority		7	0.2	N/A
Conservative gain from Whig		Swing	−3.9	

Horsfall's election was in March 1853 declared void due to bribery, and Heyworth was declared elected in his place.

General election 1857: Derby (2 seats)
Party	Candidate	Votes	%	±%
Radical	Michael Thomas Bass	884	40.9	+2.9
Radical	Samuel Beale	846	39.2	+8.3
Conservative	William Forbes Mackenzie	430	19.9	−11.2
Majority		416	19.3	+12.4
Turnout		1,295 (est)	52.2 (est)	−36.0
Registered electors		2,479		
Radical hold		Swing	+4.3	
Radical gain from Conservative		Swing	+7.0	

General election 1859: Derby (2 seats)
Party	Candidate	Votes	%	±%
Liberal	Michael Thomas Bass	1,260	35.5	−5.4
Liberal	Samuel Beale	902	25.4	−13.8
Liberal	William Milbourne James	736	20.8	N/A
Conservative	Henry Cecil Raikes	648	18.3	−1.6
Majority		166	4.6	−14.7
Turnout		1,773 (est)	70.6 (est)	+18.4
Registered electors		2,513		
Liberal hold		Swing	−2.3	
Liberal hold		Swing	−6.5	

=== Elections in the 1860s ===
General election 1865: Derby (2 seats)
Party	Candidate	Votes	%	±%
Conservative	William Thomas Cox	1,096	31.7	+13.4
Liberal	Michael Thomas Bass	1,063	30.7	+5.3
Liberal	Samuel Plimsoll	691	20.0	−0.8
Liberal	Samuel Beale	608	17.6	−7.8
Majority		488	14.1	N/A
Turnout		2,277 (est)	92.9 (est)	+22.3
Registered electors		2,450		
Conservative gain from Liberal		Swing	+7.3	
Liberal hold		Swing	−4.1	

General election 1868: Derby (2 seats)
Party	Candidate	Votes	%	±%
Liberal	Michael Thomas Bass	4,995	41.1	+10.4
Liberal	Samuel Plimsoll	4,677	38.4	+18.4
Conservative	William Thomas Cox	2,492	20.5	−11.2
Majority		2,185	17.9	N/A
Turnout		7,328 (est)	75.0 (est)	−17.9
Registered electors		9,777		
Liberal gain from Conservative		Swing	+8.0	
Liberal hold		Swing	+12.0	

=== Elections in the 1870s ===
General election 1874: Derby (2 seats)
Party	Candidate	Votes	%	±%
Liberal	Michael Thomas Bass	5,579	39.4	−1.7
Liberal	Samuel Plimsoll	4,938	34.9	−3.5
Conservative	William Thomas Cox	3,642	25.7	+5.2
Majority		1,296	9.2	−8.7
Turnout		8,901 (est)	78.7 (est)	+3.7
Registered electors		11,316		
Liberal hold		Swing	−2.2	
Liberal hold		Swing	−3.1	

=== Elections in the 1880s ===
General election 1880: Derby (2 seats)
Party	Candidate	Votes	%	±%
Liberal	Michael Thomas Bass	8,864	45.8	+6.4
Liberal	Samuel Plimsoll	7,758	40.1	+5.2
Conservative	Thomas Collins	2,730	14.1	−11.6
Majority		5,028	26.0	+16.8
Turnout		11,594 (est)	89.1 (est)	+10.4
Registered electors		13,006		
Liberal hold		Swing	+6.1	
Liberal hold		Swing	+5.5	

Plimsoll's resignation caused a by-election.

By-election, 26 May 1880: Derby (1 seat)
Party	Candidate	Votes	%	±%
Liberal	William Harcourt	Unopposed		
Liberal hold				

Bass' resignation caused a by-election.

By-election, 12 Jun 1883: Derby (1 seat)
Party	Candidate	Votes	%	±%
Liberal	Thomas Roe	Unopposed		
Liberal hold				

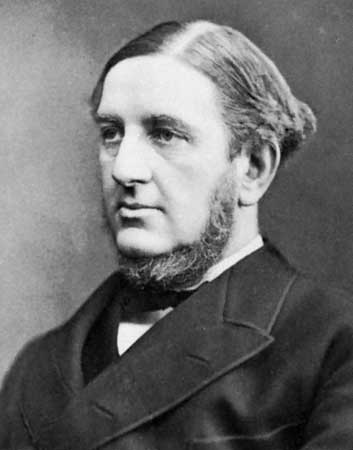
Harcourt

General election 1885: Derby (2 seats)
Party	Candidate	Votes	%	±%
Liberal	Thomas Roe	7,813	36.1	−9.7
Liberal	William Harcourt	7,630	35.3	−4.8
Conservative	William Brown Hextall	4,943	22.8	+8.7
Independent Liberal	Alfred Stace Dyer	1,251	5.8	New
Majority		2,687	12.5	−13.5
Turnout		12,868	86.2	−2.9 (est)
Registered electors		14,925		
Liberal hold		Swing	−9.2	
Liberal hold		Swing	−6.8	

Harcourt's appointment as Chancellor of the Exchequer caused a by-election.

By-election, 9 Feb 1886: Derby (1 seat)
Party	Candidate	Votes	%	±%
Liberal	William Harcourt	Unopposed		
Liberal hold				

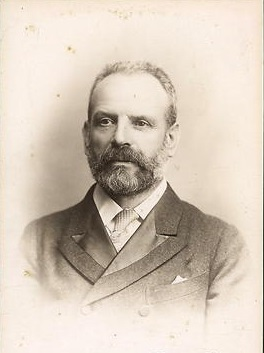
Roe

General election 1886: Derby (2 seats)
Party	Candidate	Votes	%	±%
Liberal	Thomas Roe	6,571	37.8	+1.7
Liberal	William Harcourt	6,431	37.1	+1.8
Liberal Unionist	William Evans	4,346	25.1	+2.3
Majority		2,085	12.0	−0.5
Turnout		10,758	72.1	−14.1
Registered electors		14,925		
Liberal hold		Swing	+0.3	
Liberal hold		Swing	+0.3	

=== Elections in the 1890s ===
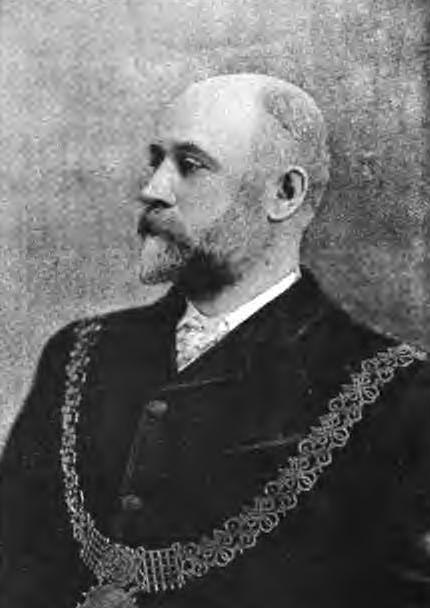
Haslam

General election 1892: Derby (2 seats)
Party	Candidate	Votes	%	±%
Liberal	William Harcourt	7,507	29.1	−8.7
Liberal	Thomas Roe	7,389	28.6	−8.5
Conservative	William Brown Hextall	5,546	21.5	New
Liberal Unionist	Alfred Seale Haslam	5,363	20.8	−4.3
Majority		1,843	7.1	−4.9
Turnout		12,903 (Note: Based on half of the total votes)	83.6	+11.5
Registered electors		15,754		
Liberal hold		Swing	−2.2	
Liberal hold		Swing	−2.1	

Harcourt's appointment as Chancellor of the Exchequer requires a by-election.

1892 Derby by-election
Party	Candidate	Votes	%	±%
Liberal	William Harcourt	6,508	80.1	+22.4
Independent	Henry Farmer-Atkinson (Note: Supported by Henry Varley's Social Purity Alliance)	1,619	19.9	New
Majority		4,889	60.2	+53.1
Turnout		8,127	51.6	−32.0
Registered electors		15,754		
Liberal hold		Swing		

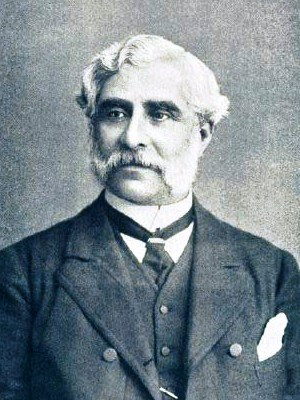
Bemrose

Drage

General election 1895: Derby (2 seats)
Party	Candidate	Votes	%	±%
Conservative	Henry Howe Bemrose	7,907	28.0	+6.5
Conservative	Geoffrey Drage	7,076	25.1	+4.3
Liberal	William Harcourt	6,785	24.0	−5.1
Liberal	Thomas Roe	6,475	22.9	−5.7
Majority		291	1.1	N/A
Turnout		14,122	82.8	−0.8
Registered electors		17,379		
Conservative gain from Liberal		Swing	+5.8	
Conservative gain from Liberal		Swing	+4.7	

=== Elections in the 1900s ===
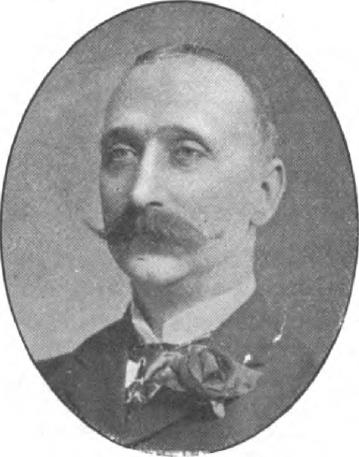
Bell

General election 1900: Derby (2 seats)
Party	Candidate	Votes	%	±%
Liberal	Thomas Roe	7,922	26.6	−20.3'"`UNIQ−−ref−00000119−QINU`"'
Labour Repr. Cmte.	Richard Bell	7,640	25.7	New
Conservative	Henry Howe Bemrose	7,397	24.9	−3.1
Conservative	Geoffrey Drage	6,775	22.8	−2.3
Turnout		29,734	84.5	+1.7
Registered electors		18,270		
Majority		525	1.7	N/A
Liberal gain from Conservative		Swing		
Majority		865	3.8	N/A
Labour Repr. Cmte. gain from Conservative		Swing		

General election 1906: Derby (2 seats)
Party	Candidate	Votes	%	±%
Lib-Lab	Richard Bell	10,361	31.0	+5.3
Liberal	Thomas Roe	10,239	30.6	+4.0
Conservative	James Henry Edward Holford	6,421	19.2	−5.7
Conservative	Edward George Spencer Churchill	6,409	19.2	−3.6
Turnout		33,430	87.6	+3.1
Registered electors		19,543		
Majority		3,818	11.4	+9.7
Lib-Lab hold		Swing	+5.5	
Liberal hold		Swing	+4.9	

=== Elections in the 1910s ===
General election January 1910: Derby (2 seats)
Party	Candidate	Votes	%	±%
Liberal	Thomas Roe	10,343	28.3	−2.3
Labour	J. H. Thomas (Note: Compared to Lib-Lab candidate in 1906)	10,189	27.9	−3.1
Conservative	Arthur Edward Beck	8,038	22.0	+2.8
Conservative	Arthur Page	7,953	21.8	+2.6
Turnout		36,523	92.5	+4.9
Registered electors		20,113		
Majority		2,305	6.3	−5.1
Liberal hold		Swing	−2.6	
Majority		2,151	5.9	N/A
Labour gain from Lib-Lab		Swing		

General election December 1910: Derby (2 seats)
Party	Candidate	Votes	%	±%
Liberal	Thomas Roe	9,515	35.5	+7.2
Labour	J. H. Thomas	9,144	34.1	+6.2
Conservative	Arthur Edward Beck (Note: Compared to combined Conservative share at Jan 1910 election)	8,160	30.4	−13.4
Turnout		26,819	88.0	−4.5
Registered electors		20,113		
Majority		1,355	5.1	−1.2
Liberal hold		Swing	+10.3	
Majority		984	3.7	−2.2
Labour hold		Swing	+9.8	

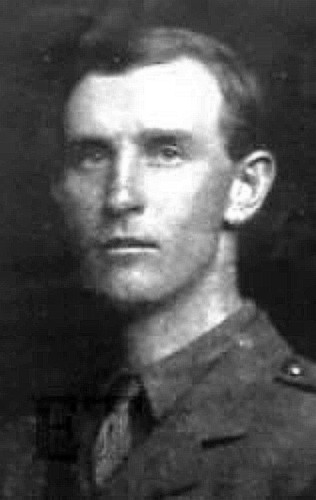
Asquith

General Election 1914–15:

Another General Election was required to take place before the end of 1915. The political parties had been making preparations for an election to take place and by July 1914, the following candidates had been selected;

- Liberal: Raymond Asquith
- Labour: J. H. Thomas
- Unionist: Arthur Edward Beck

Collins

1916 Derby by-election
Party	Candidate	Votes	%	±%
Liberal	William Collins	Unopposed		
Liberal hold				

General election 1918: Derby (2 seats)
Party	Candidate	Votes	%	±%
Labour	J. H. Thomas	25,145	37.8	+3.7
Unionist	Albert Green	14,920	22.4	−8.0
Liberal	William Blews Rowbotham	13,408	20.2	−15.3
National Democratic	Harold Machin Smith	13,012	19.6	New
Turnout		66,485	65.5	−22.5
Majority		1,512	2.2	N/A
Unionist gain from Liberal		Swing		
Majority		11,737	17.6	+13.9
Labour hold		Swing		

=== Elections in the 1920s ===
Roberts

General election 1922: Derby (2 seats)
Party	Candidate	Votes	%	±%
Labour	✓ J. H. Thomas	25,215	27.0	−10.8
Liberal	✓ Charles Henry Roberts	24,068	25.8	+5.6
Unionist	Albert Green	22,240	23.9	+1.5
Labour	William Raynes	21,677	23.3	N/A
Turnout		93,200	84.0	+18.5
Majority		1,828	1.9	N/A
Liberal gain from Unionist		Swing		
Majority		2,975	3.1	−14.5
Labour hold		Swing		

General election 1923: Derby (2 seats)
Party	Candidate	Votes	%	±%
Labour	✓ J. H. Thomas	24,887	29.0	+2.0
Labour	✓ William Robert Raynes	20,318	23.7	+0.4
Unionist	Henry Fitz-Herbert Wright	20,070	23.4	−0.5
Liberal	Charles Henry Roberts	10,669	12.5	−13.3
Ind. Unionist	Thomas Clifford Newbold	9,772	11.4	New
Turnout		85,716	81.1	−2.9
Majority		9,649	11.2	N/A
Labour gain from Liberal		Swing	+6.8	

Henderson Stewart

General election 1924: Derby (2 seats)
Party	Candidate	Votes	%	±%
Labour	✓ J. H. Thomas	27,423	25.7	−3.3
Unionist	✓ Richard Luce	25,425	23.8	+0.4
Labour	William Robert Raynes	25,172	23.6	−0.1
Unionist	Hilda Hulse	21,700	20.3	N/A
Liberal	James Henderson-Stewart	7,083	6.6	−5.9
Turnout		99,720	85.2	+4.1
Majority		5,723	5.4	+5.1
Labour hold		Swing		
Majority		353	0.2	N/A
Unionist gain from Labour		Swing		

General election 1929: Derby (2 seats)
Party	Candidate	Votes	%	±%
Labour	✓ J. H. Thomas	39,688	30.0	+4.3
Labour	✓ William Robert Raynes	36,237	27.4	+3.8
Unionist	Richard Luce	24,553	18.6	−5.2
Unionist	John Arthur Aiton	20,443	15.4	−4.9
Liberal	L. du Garde Peach	11,317	8.6	+2.0
Turnout		132,238	82.6	−2.6
Majority		11,684	8.8	N/A
Labour gain from Unionist		Swing	+4.5	
Labour hold		Swing		

=== Elections in the 1930s ===
General election 1931: Derby (2 seats)
Party	Candidate	Votes	%	±%
National Labour	✓ J. H. Thomas	49,257	36.4	N/A
Conservative	✓ William Reid	47,729	34.3	+0.3
Labour	William Robert Raynes	21,841	15.7	−11.7
Labour	Walter Halls	20,241	14.6	−12.8
Majority		27,416	19.7	+10.9
Turnout		139,068	84.5	+1.9
National Labour hold		Swing		
Conservative gain from Labour		Swing		

General election 1935: Derby (2 seats)
Party	Candidate	Votes	%	±%
Conservative	✓ William Reid	37,707	30.19	
National Labour	✓ J. H. Thomas	37,566	30.08	
Labour	Herbert Arthur Hind	25,037	20.04	
Labour	Leonard John Barnes	24,594	19.69	
Majority		12,670	10.15	
Turnout		124,904		
Conservative hold		Swing		
National Labour hold		Swing		

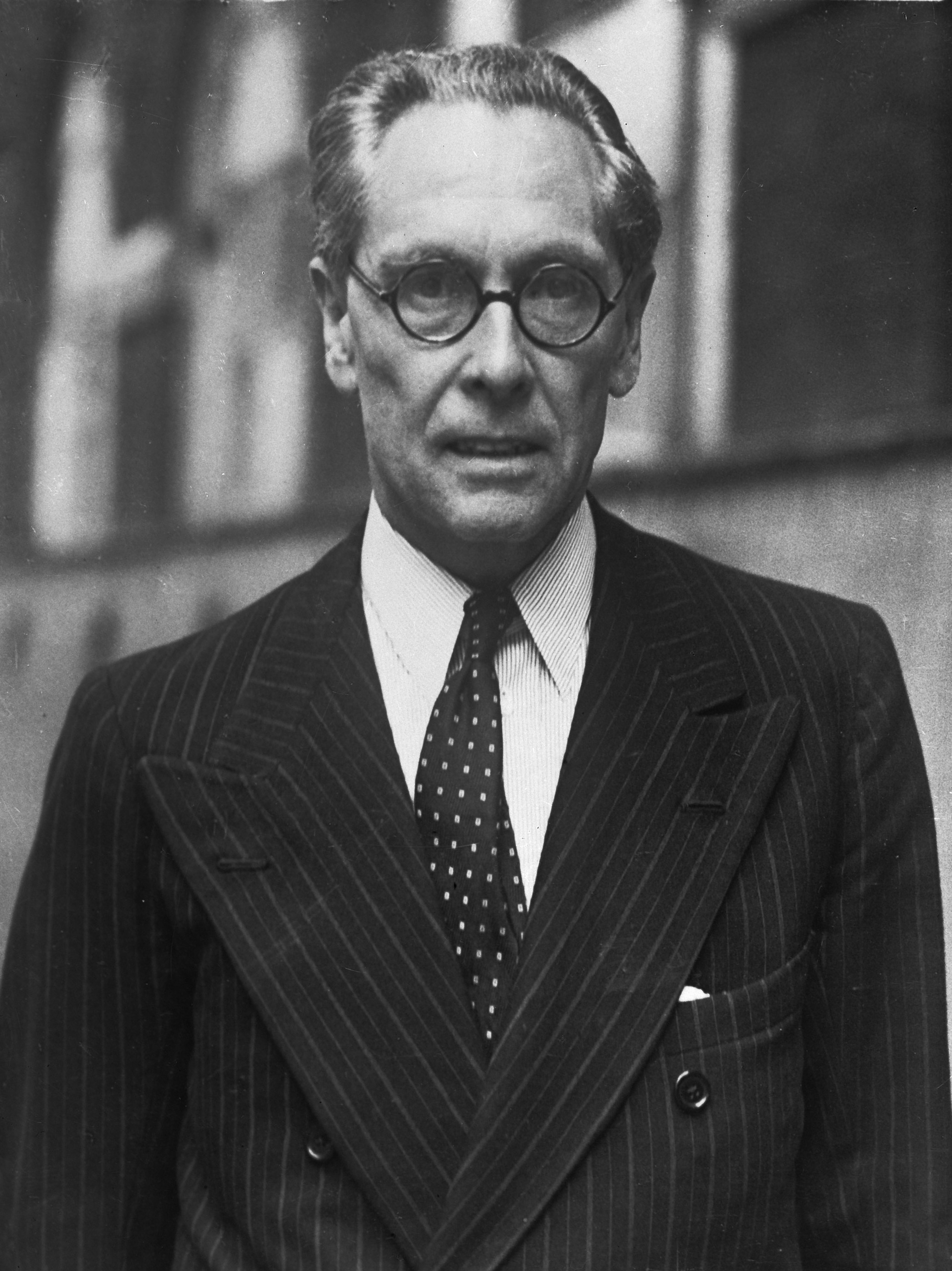
Noel-Baker

1936 Derby by-election
Party	Candidate	Votes	%	±%
Labour	Philip Noel-Baker	28,419	52.5	+12.8
National Labour	Archibald Church	25,666	47.5	+17.4
Majority		2,753	5.0	N/A
Turnout		54,085	65.5	
Labour gain from National Labour		Swing		

=== Elections in the 1940s ===
General Election 1939–40:

Another General Election was required to take place before the end of 1940. The political parties had been making preparations for an election to take place in Autumn 1939 and by then, the following candidates had been selected;

- Labour: Philip Noel-Baker and A E Hunter
- Conservative: P C Cooper-Parry
- National Labour: Archibald Church

General election 1945: Derby (2 seats)
Party	Candidate	Votes	%	±%
Labour	✓ Philip Noel-Baker	42,196	33.60	
Labour	✓ Clifford Wilcock	40,800	32.49	
Conservative	Francis Lochrane	21,460	17.09	
Conservative	Max Bemrose	21,125	16.82	
Majority		19,340	16.51	N/A
Turnout		125,581	76.39	
Labour gain from Conservative		Swing		
Labour hold		Swing		

== See also ==
- List of former United Kingdom Parliament constituencies
- Unreformed House of Commons
