= Samuel Beale =

English railway entrepreneur and local politician (1803–1874)

Samuel Beale MP JP
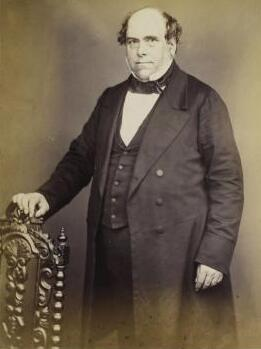

Member of Parliament for Derby
- In office 28 March 1857 – 12 July 1865 Serving with Michael Thomas Bass
- Preceded by: Michael Thomas Bass; Lawrence Heyworth
- Succeeded by: Michael Thomas Bass; William Thomas Cox

Personal details
- Born: 4 June 1803 Birmingham, England
- Died: 11 September 1874 (aged 71)
- Party: Liberal
- Spouse: Emma Butcher (m. 1823)
- Parent(s): William Beale; Sarah

Samuel Beale (4 June 1803 – 11 September 1874) was a British Liberal Party politician, banker and industrialist.

== Early life ==
Beale was born in Birmingham in 1803 to William and Sarah and, in 1823, married Emma Butcher, daughter of Unitarian minister Edmund Butcher. At some point this marriage ended, and he remarried to a Mary. He had at least two sons, William Lansdowne (born 1828–29) and Arthur, and two daughters. He was also the uncle of William Beale, a barrister and fellow Liberal politician.

In early life he was a glass and lead merchant before, in 1836, founded the Birmingham and Midland Bank. He also became Director of Union Bank UK.

In 1844, he became Chairman of the Midland Railway, a post he held for 20 years, and in 1849 a Justice of the Peace for Birmingham. In 1853, he was an ironmaster and partner in the Park Gate Iron and Steel Company.

== Political career ==
Beale started his career in politics in 1841 when he was appointed Mayor of Birmingham, and became one of the town's first councillors.

Beale was elected MP for Derby in 1857 and held the seat until 1865.

== Unitarian activities ==
Beale was an active unitarian follower, becoming a Member of Church of the Messiah, Birmingham and vice-president of the British and Foreign Unitarian Association. During the 1857 general election, which he was contending, Beale attended a service despite being warned that he would lose if he did so.

Parliament of the United Kingdom
Preceded by Michael Thomas Bass; Lawrence Heyworth	Member of Parliament for Derby; 1857–1865; With: Michael Thomas Bass	Succeeded by Michael Thomas Bass; William Thomas Cox
