= Peter Chapman =

Peter Chapman may refer to:

- Peter Chapman (politician) (born 1950), Scottish Conservative politician
- Peter Chapman (murderer) (born 1977), English convicted murderer
- Peter Chapman (cartoonist) (1925–2016), Australian comic book writer and illustrator
- Coins (composer) (Peter Chapman, born 1980), Canadian music producer and composer

== See also ==
- Peter la Chapman (fl. 1306), English politician
- Peter Chatman, a pseudonym of American blues pianist Memphis Slim (1915–1988)
