= Ralph Shaw =

Ralph Shaw may refer to:

- Ralph Shaw (writer) (1913–1996), British author and journalist
- Ralph R. Shaw (1907–1972), American librarian and publisher

== See also ==
- Ralph Shore (died 1430/1), MP for Derby
