= Edward Strutt, 1st Baron Belper =

British politician

The Right Honourable The Lord Belper PC FRS
- Arms of Baron Belper

Chancellor of the Duchy of Lancaster
- In office 3 January 1853 – 21 June 1854
- Monarch: Victoria
- Prime Minister: The Earl of Aberdeen
- Preceded by: Robert Adam Christopher
- Succeeded by: The Earl Granville

Personal details
- Born: 26 October 1801 Derby, Derbyshire
- Died: 30 June 1880 (aged 78) Eaton Square, Belgravia, London
- Party: Whig Party
- Spouse: Amelia Otter (m. 1837)
- Education: Trinity College, Cambridge

Edward Strutt, 1st Baron Belper PC FRS (26 October 1801 – 30 June 1880), was a British Whig Party politician. He served as Chancellor of the Duchy of Lancaster from 1852 to 1854 under Lord Aberdeen.

== Background and education ==
Born at St Helen's House Derby, Strutt was the only son of William Strutt, of St Helen's House, Derbyshire, and the grandson of Jedediah Strutt. His mother was Barbara, daughter of Thomas Evans.

He was educated at Trinity College, Cambridge, where he was President of the Cambridge Union in 1821. Strutt graduated as a Bachelor of Arts in 1823, promoted to Master of Arts three years later.

== Political career ==
Strutt entered the British House of Commons in 1830, sitting as Member of Parliament for Derby until 1848, when he was unseated on petition. He represented Arundel from 1851 to 1852 and Nottingham from 1852 to 1856. He was Chief Commissioner of Railways between 1846 and 1848 and served as Chancellor of the Duchy of Lancaster from 1853 to 1854 in Lord Aberdeen's coalition government. He was sworn of the Privy Council in 1846 and in 1856 he was raised to the peerage as Baron Belper, of Belper, in the County of Derby.

Strutt also held the honorary posts of High Sheriff of Nottinghamshire in 1850 and Lord Lieutenant of Nottinghamshire between 1864 and 1880, having been previously a Deputy Lieutenant. In 1860 he was elected a Fellow of the Royal Society and between 1871 and 1879, he was President of University College, London.

== Family ==
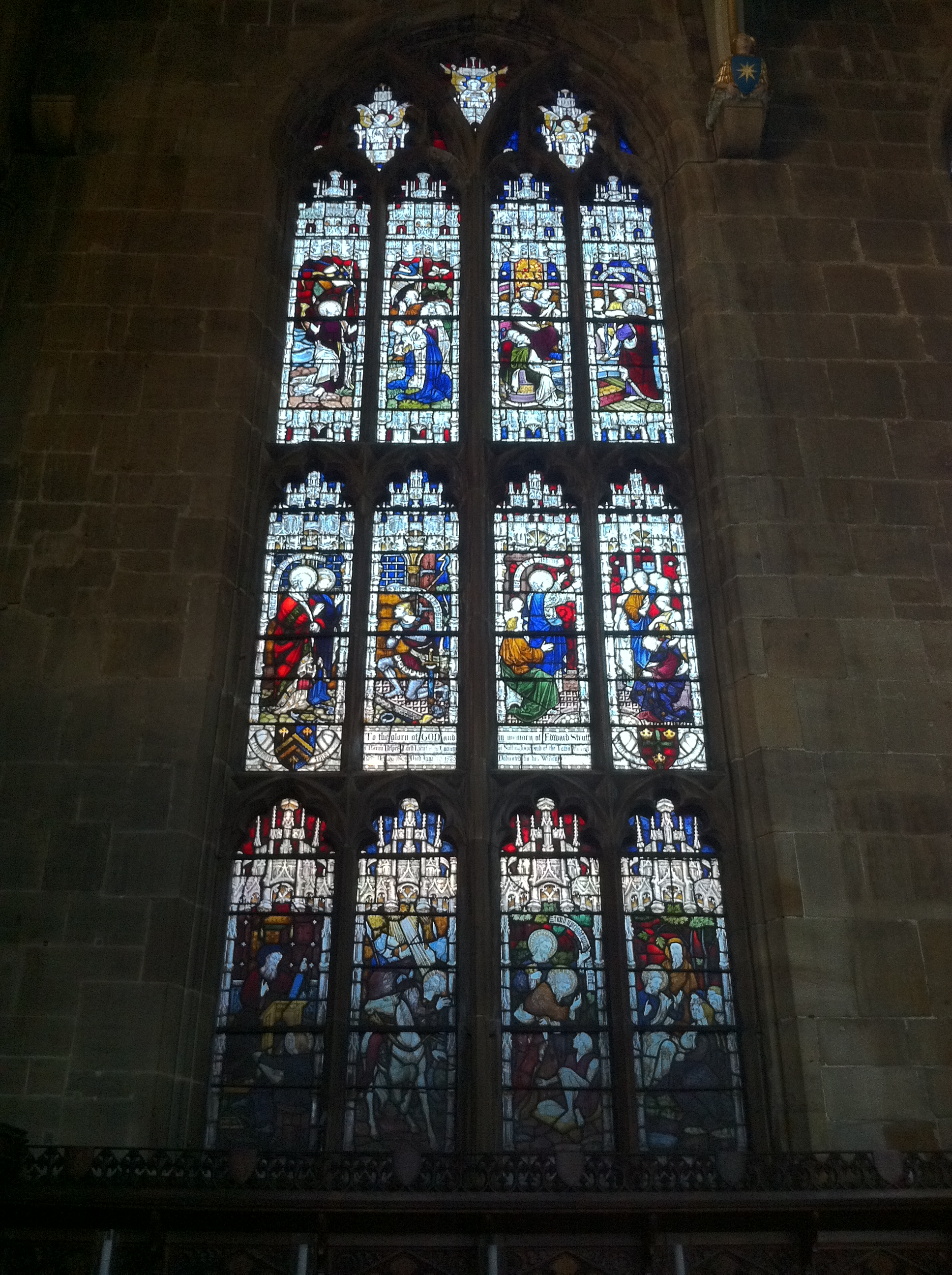
Memorial window to Lord Belper in the chancel of St Mary's Church, Nottingham. His coat of arms can be seen in the left hand light of the second tier.

Lord Belper married Amelia Harriet Otter, daughter of the Right Reverend William Otter, Bishop of Chichester, on 28 March 1837. They had several children. They were the parents of Henry Strutt, 2nd Baron Belper.

Children from the marriage were:

- Caroline Strutt (d. 23 July 1926) married Sir Kenelm Edward Digby, son of Kenelm Henry Digby and Caroline Sheppard, on 30 August 1870.
- Ellen Strutt (d. 31 December 1940) married George Murray Smith the Younger on 22 October 1885.
- Sophia Strutt (d. 2 December 1928) married Sir Henry Denis Le Marchant, 2nd Baronet., son of Sir Denis Le Marchant, 1st Baronet, on 7 September 1869.
- William Strutt (7 May 1838 – 19 January 1856) died in Bonn, Germany.
- Henry Strutt, 2nd Baron Belper (20 May 1840 – 26 July 1914)
- Arthur Strutt (3 Mar 1842 – 6 February 1877) married Alice Mary Elizabeth March Phillipps de Lisle, daughter of Ambrose Lisle March Phillipps De Lisle and Laura Maria Clifford, on 22 April 1873.

He built his family seat, Kingston Hall, Nottinghamshire and moved in 1846.

Lord Belper died at Eaton Square, Belgravia, London, in June 1880, aged 78, and was succeeded in the barony by his second but eldest surviving son, Henry. A stained glass window was erected in the north side of the chancel in St. Mary's Church, Nottingham in his memory. Lady Belper died in December 1890.

Parliament of the United Kingdom
Preceded by Samuel Crompton; Henry Cavendish	Member of Parliament for Derby; 1830–1848; With: Henry Cavendish 1830–1835; John Ponsonby 1835–1847; Frederick Leveson-Gower 1847–1848	Succeeded by Lawrence Heyworth; Michael Thomas Bass
Preceded by The Earl of Arundel	Member of Parliament for Arundel; 1851–1852	Succeeded by Lord Edward Fitzalan-Howard
Preceded by Feargus O'Connor	Member of Parliament for Nottingham; 1852–1856	Succeeded by Charles Paget
Political offices
Preceded by Robert Adam Christopher	Chancellor of the Duchy of Lancaster; 1853–1854	Succeeded by The Earl Granville
Honorary titles
Preceded by The Duke of Newcastle	Lord Lieutenant of Nottinghamshire; 1864–1880	Succeeded by The Duke of St Albans
Preceded by Granville Harcourt-Vernon	High Sheriff of Nottinghamshire; 1850	Succeeded by John Francklin
Peerage of the United Kingdom
New creation	Baron Belper; 1856–1880	Succeeded by Henry Strutt
