= William Bourne de Derby =

13th-century English politician

William Bourne de Derby (fl. 1297), was an English Member of Parliament (MP).

He was a Member of the Parliament of England for Derby in 1297.

Parliament of England
Preceded by William de la Cornere; Randalph Makeneye	Member of Parliament for Derby; 1297; With: Nicklos de Lorimer	Succeeded by Nicklos de Lorimer; Gervase de Derby
