= Henry Ainsworth (disambiguation) =

Henry Ainsworth 1571–1622) was a clergyman and scholar.

Henry Ainsworth may also refer to:

- Henry Ainsworth (MP) (1502–1556/57), MP for Derby
- Henry Ainsworth, character in Sowers and Reapers

== See also ==
- Harry Ainsworth (1888–1965), British newspaper editor
