= William Thomas Cox =

British politician

William Cox MP

Member of Parliament for Derby
- In office 11 July 1865 – 17 November 1868 Serving with Michael Thomas Bass
- Preceded by: Samuel Beale
- Succeeded by: Samuel Plimsoll

Personal details
- Born: 1808/1809
- Died: 18 March 1877
- Party: Conservative

William Thomas Cox (1808/1809 – 18 March 1877) was a British politician who was elected a Member of Parliament (MP) for Derby as a Conservative in 1865. He held his seat until the election in 1868 in which he was defeated. Later, Cox attempted to regain his seat in 1874, but failed.

Parliament of the United Kingdom
Preceded by Michael Thomas Bass and Samuel Beale	Member of Parliament for Derby; 1865 – 1868; With: Michael Thomas Bass	Succeeded by Michael Thomas Bass and Samuel Plimsoll
