= James Thatcher =

James Thatcher may refer to:

- James Thatcher (musician), American hornist
- James Thatcher (MP), English politician
- James W. Thatcher, American computer scientist

== See also ==
- James Thacher, American physician and writer
- James Kingsley Thacher, professor of medicine
