= Adam Reed (disambiguation) =

Adam Reed (born 1970) is an American voice actor.

Adam Reed may also refer to:

- Adam Reed (footballer, born 1975), English footballer
- Adam Reed (footballer, born 1991), English footballer

== See also ==
- Adam Reid, Canadian actor
- Adam Reid (filmmaker), American filmmaker
- Adam le Rede (fl.1301), MP for Derby
