= Henry Howe Bemrose (geologist) =

Dr Henry Howe Arnold Bemrose FGS (13 March 1857, Derby – 17 July 1939, Derby) was an English printer, publisher, geologist, educationalist and scouter.

He, early in life, assumed the name of "Arnold-Bemrose" to distinguish his name from that of his father, Sir Henry Howe Bemrose (1827–1911) and, upon the death of his father, reverted to the name "Bemrose". Arnold-Bemrose graduated B.A. 1879 from Clare College, Cambridge and then entered his father's printing firm of Bemrose and Sons, where he remained active for over fifty years. Arnold-Bemrose received his M.A. in 1882 and his Sc.D. in 1908 from Clare College, Cambridge.

Geologist He published over twenty papers dealing mostly with geology, as well as the 1910 book Derbyshire on the county's geology, history, antiquities, and architecture. He received an Honorary Doctorate in Science for his original work on the geology of Derbyshire in 1908 and received the Murchison Medal in 1938.

Henry was closely involved in the discovery and identification of the Allenton Hippopotamus in 1895 in a well dug at the Crown Inn in Allenton, 3 miles south of Derby. He suggested that the bones were supporting evidence that there had been a land bridge between Britain and Europe, this being the most obvious explanation for such bones being found in England, Europe and underneath the North Sea. The bones of the hippopotamus are now in Derby Museum.

Educationalist and public servant In 1880 Henry became Honorary Secretary to the Derby Branch of the Cambridge Society for the extension of University Teaching. The Society was inspired by social idealists such as Carlyle, Ruskin and Morris and aimed to bring University level education into the wider community as a counter to unacceptable social differences. The Society had suspended its activities in Derby for the previous five years and Henry continued as Secretary to 1903.

He was elected to Derby Town Council for Becket Ward in 1903 (aged 46) and remained on it for 35 years until 1938. He was a member of the Education Committee from 1903 to 1938, becoming Vice-Chairman in 1905 and Chairman 1923-38. He was Mayor of Derby in 1919-10.

He was also a Magistrate from 1904 and Chairman of the Waterworks Committee 1911-1923, and also a member of Derwent Valley Water Board from 1911, deputy Chairman from 1912, and Chairman from 1916. He was also a Governor of Nottingham University.

In 1930 Bemrose School, a new grammar school in Derby, was opened and named in honour of the services to education of the Bemrose family and Henry in particular. In 1935 he was among those who received the King George V Silver Jubilee Medal.

He was described as ‘a Conservative by tradition rather than ideology’ and on his death, the Derby Telegraph commented that ‘his concept of citizenship never allowed himself to identify himself with party politics as might have been expected of him’.
