= J. H. Thomas =

British politician (1874–1949)

The Right Honourable J. H. Thomas
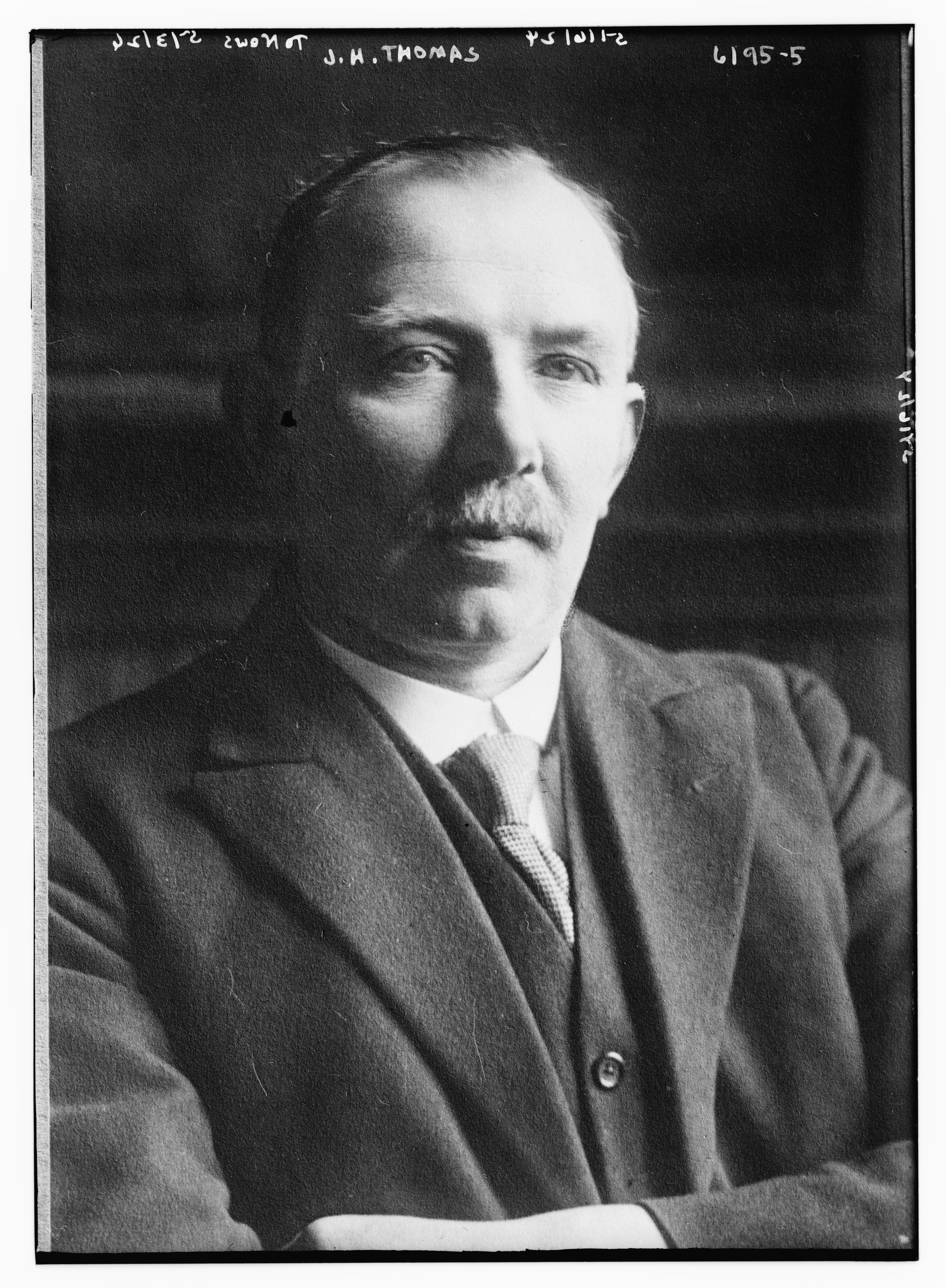

Secretary of State for the Colonies
- In office 22 November 1935 – 22 May 1936
- Prime Minister: Stanley Baldwin
- Preceded by: Malcolm MacDonald
- Succeeded by: William Ormsby-Gore
- In office 25 August 1931 – 5 November 1931
- Prime Minister: Ramsay MacDonald
- Preceded by: The Lord Passfield
- Succeeded by: Sir Philip Cunliffe-Lister
- In office 22 January 1924 – 3 November 1924
- Prime Minister: Ramsay MacDonald
- Preceded by: The Duke of Devonshire
- Succeeded by: Leo Amery

Secretary of State for Dominion Affairs
- In office 5 June 1930 – 22 November 1935
- Prime Minister: Ramsay MacDonald; Stanley Baldwin
- Preceded by: The Lord Passfield
- Succeeded by: Malcolm MacDonald

Lord Privy Seal
- In office 7 June 1929 – 5 June 1930
- Prime Minister: Ramsay MacDonald
- Preceded by: The Marquess of Salisbury
- Succeeded by: Vernon Hartshorn

Personal details
- Born: James Henry Thomas; 3 October 1874 Newport, Monmouthshire, Wales
- Died: 21 January 1949 (aged 74) London
- Party: Labour; National Labour
- Education: None

James Henry Thomas PC (3 October 1874 – 21 January 1949) was a Welsh trade unionist and politician. He was involved in a political scandal involving budget leaks.

== Early career and trade union activities ==
Thomas was born in Newport, Monmouthshire, the son of a young unmarried mother. He was raised by his grandmother and began work at twelve years of age, soon starting a career as a railway worker. He became an official of the Amalgamated Society of Railway Servants and in 1913 helped to organise its merger with two smaller trade unions on the railways to form the National Union of Railwaymen (now part of the National Union of Rail, Maritime and Transport Workers). Thomas was elected NUR general secretary in 1916, a post he held until 1931.

Thomas was general secretary during the successful national rail strike of 1919 that was jointly called by the NUR and Associated Society of Locomotive Engineers and Firemen against proposed wage reductions. In 1921 Thomas played a leading role in the Black Friday crisis, in which rail and transport unions failed to come to the aid of the National Union of Mineworkers, who were facing wage reductions. Before the 1926 General Strike the Trades Union Congress asked Thomas to negotiate with Stanley Baldwin's Conservative Government, but the talks were unsuccessful and the strike went ahead.

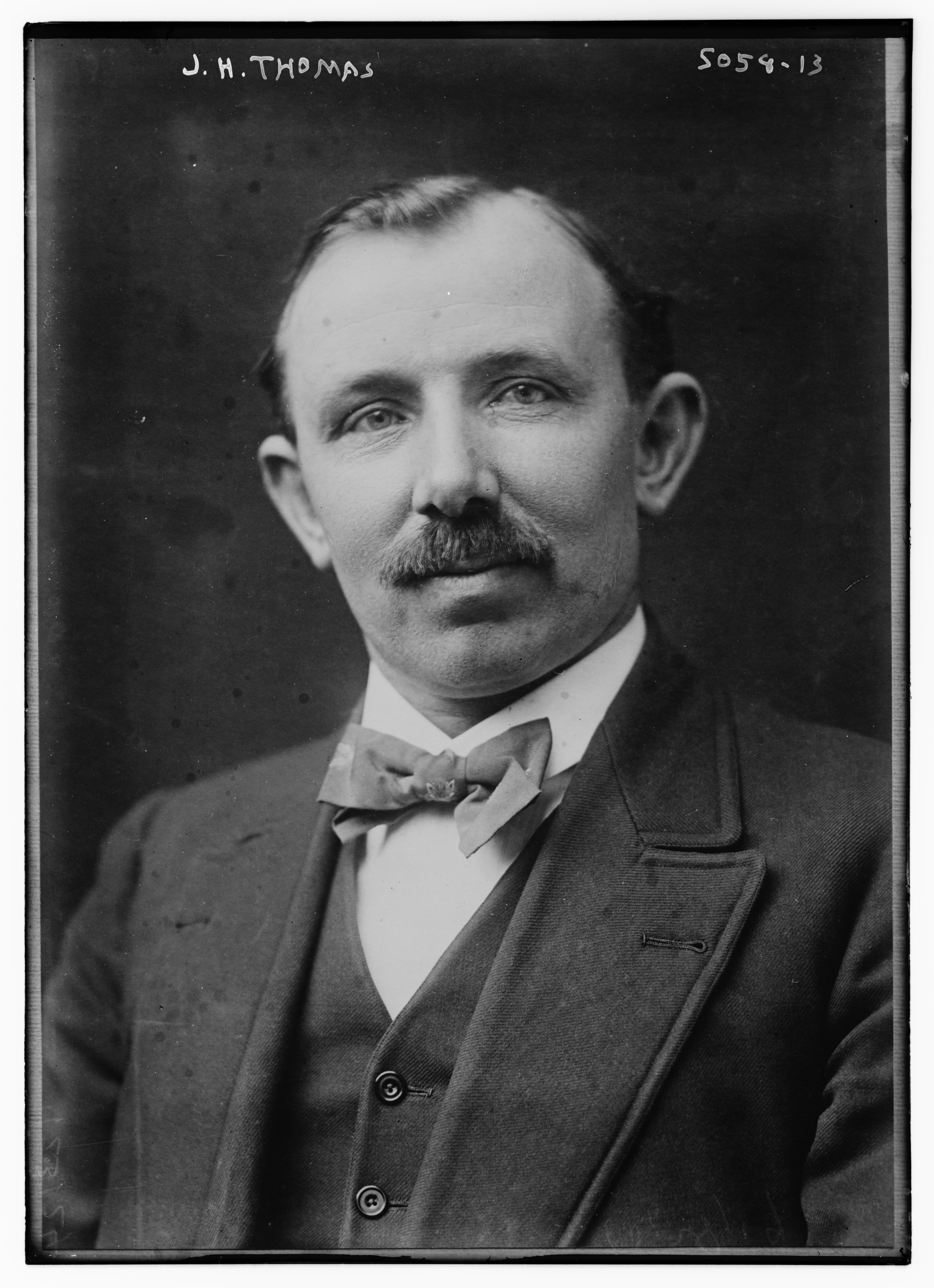
James Henry Thomas circa 1920

== Political career ==
Thomas began his political career as a Labour Party local councillor for Swindon. He was elected to Parliament in 1910 as the Member of Parliament (MP) for Derby, replacing Richard Bell. He was re-elected in the 1918 general election and was considered as a potential candidate for the role of Chairman of the Parliamentary Labour Party and by extension Leader of the Opposition. He declined in order to focus on running the NUR, and the post went to William Adamson.

He was appointed Secretary of State for the Colonies in the incoming Labour government of 1924 under Ramsay MacDonald. In the second Labour government of 1929 Macdonald wanted to appoint Thomas as Foreign Secretary, but the post was already desired by Arthur Henderson. Thomas was made Lord Privy Seal with special responsibility for employment. He rejected the Mosley Memorandum issued by junior ministers led by Oswald Mosley proposing public works programmes and the expansion of Imperial Preference into an autarkic trade bloc to resolve interwar unemployment and poverty in 1930. Mosley subsequently resigned from the Cabinet, and in the ensuing reshuffle Thomas was reassigned to the post of Secretary of State for the Dominions.

Thomas retained that position in MacDonald's National Government (1931–1935). As a result of joining the National Government he was expelled from the Labour Party and the NUR. For the first few months of the National Government in 1931 he also served as Colonial Secretary once more. One of the problems he had to cope with was the Australian cricket bodyline affair, which he said was one of the most difficult he faced.

Thomas served as Secretary of State for the Colonies once more from 1935 until May 1936, when he was forced to resign from politics. He was accused of leaking Budget secrets to his stockbroker son, Leslie Thomas, and Alfred Cosher Bates, a wealthy businessman. In a Judicial Tribunal set up by the government, Bates admitted giving Thomas £15,000 but claimed it was an advance for a proposed autobiography. This high sum for an autobiography, not yet written, only increased suspicion of the two men's relationship, and Thomas was forced to resign from the government and House of Commons. However, his son was cleared of wrongdoing.

== Personal life ==
Thomas was made a Freeman of Newport in 1924. In May 2011 a casket given to him to celebrate the occasion was purchased at auction for Newport Museum.

Despite his humble origins he had a reputation for mixing well with all levels of society. Among the Labour ministers he was a favourite with George V. It was from laughing at a bawdy joke Thomas told the king that the latter split a post-operative wound from lung abscess surgery, delaying his recovery to near the 1929 General Election. Winston Churchill is said to have been in tears during Thomas's resignation speech as Colonial Secretary; and King Edward VIII recalled Thomas saying, as he returned his seals of office to the king, 'Thank God your old Dad never got to hear of this'. Thomas was known as a natty dresser, and was caricatured by the cartoonist David Low as "Lord Dress Suit".

After leaving parliament, Thomas served as company chairman of the British Amalgamated Transport Ltd.

== Death ==
He died in London, aged seventy-four, in 1949. After cremation at Golders Green Crematorium, his ashes were buried at Swindon. His son Leslie Thomas became a Conservative Member of Parliament.

== Literary references ==
Thomas is mentioned in Have His Carcase, a 1932 detective novel by Dorothy L. Sayers. Thomas's custom of wearing a dress suit is cited as an apparent certainty that could fail unlike the second law of thermodynamics, which appears to govern the case in a metaphorical way.

In Lord Peter Wimsey, the 1975 BBC One production of Dorothy L. Sayers's 1931 novel Five Red Herrings, Thomas is mentioned in a snatch of background dialogue. A Scottish railway porter bursts out in an angry tirade: "You call this a Socialist Government? Things are harder than ever for a working man, and as for Jimmy Thomas, he has sold himself, lock, stock and barrel, to the capitalists!"

He is referred to in the comic song of 1932 by Norman Long, "On the Day that Chelsea went and won the Cup". In a dream setting out the outlandish and impossible things that might happen on such an unusual day, the line is used "and de Valera put a statue of Jim Thomas on his lawn, on the day that Chelsea went and won the cup".

He is mentioned in No Mean City by A. McArthur and H. Kingsley Long, "Now he insisted on reading extracts from a speech by J. H. Thomas, declaring, moreover, that the railwaymen had never had abler leader".

In Ngaio Marsh's Tied Up in Tinsel (1972), a self-made man who clings to his cockney accent says defiantly, "They tell you George V took a shiner to Jimmy Thomas, don't they? Why? Because he was Jimmy Thomas and no beg yer pardons. If 'e forgot 'imself and left an aitch in, 'e went back and dropped it. Fact!"

== Bibliography ==
- Blaxland, Gregory. J. H. Thomas: A Life for Unity (London: Frederick Muller, 1964).
- Thorpe, Andrew (1997). A History of the British Labour Party (1 ed.). London: Red Globe Press. doi:10.1007/978-1-349-25305-0. ISBN 9781137409829.

Parliament of the United Kingdom
Preceded by Richard Bell; Sir Thomas Roe	Member of Parliament for Derby; January 1910–1936; With: Sir Thomas Roe to 1916; Sir William Collins 1916–1918; Albert Green 1918–1922; Charles Roberts 1922–1923; William Raynes 1923–1924; Sir Richard Luce 1924–1929; William Raynes 1929–1931; William Allan Reid from 1931	Succeeded by William Allan Reid; Philip Noel-Baker
Trade union offices
Preceded by J. E. Williams	Assistant Secretary of the Amalgamated Society of Railway Servants; 1910–1913	Position abolished
New post	Assistant General Secretary of the National Union of Railwaymen; 1913–1916; With: Samuel Chorlton; Walter Hudson; Thomas Lowth	Succeeded by Samuel Chorlton; Walter Hudson; Thomas Lowth
Preceded by J. E. Williams	General Secretary of the National Union of Railwaymen; 1916–1931	Succeeded by Charlie Cramp
Preceded by G. H. Stuart-Bunning	President of the Trades Union Congress; 1920	Succeeded by Edward L. Poulton
Preceded by W. A. Appleton	President of the International Federation of Trade Unions; 1920–1924	Succeeded by A. A. Purcell
Preceded by Jack Jones and J. W. Ogden	Trades Union Congress representative to the American Federation of Labour; 1921; With: James Walker	Succeeded by Edward L. Poulton and Herbert Smith
Political offices
Preceded by The Duke of Devonshire	Secretary of State for the Colonies; 1924	Succeeded by Leo Amery
Preceded by The Marquess of Salisbury	Lord Privy Seal; 1929–1930	Succeeded by Vernon Hartshorn
Preceded by The Lord Passfield	Secretary of State for Dominion Affairs; 1930–1935	Succeeded by Malcolm MacDonald
Preceded by The Lord Passfield	Secretary of State for the Colonies; 1931	Succeeded by Sir Philip Cunliffe-Lister
Preceded by Malcolm MacDonald	Secretary of State for the Colonies; 1935–1936	Succeeded by Hon. William Ormsby-Gore
