= George Stringer (MP) =

16th-century English politician

George Stringer (fl. 1554) was an English politician.

He was a member (MP) of the parliament of England for Derby in April 1554.
