= Geoffrey Drage =

British politician

Drage in 1895.

Geoffrey Drage (17 August 1860 – 7 March 1955) was an English writer and Conservative Party politician. He was concerned particularly with the problems of the poor.

== Early life and family ==
Drage was the son of Dr Charles Drage (1825–1922) of Hatfield in Hertfordshire. He was educated at Eton and at Christ Church, Oxford, where he graduated in 1883, before pursuing further studies in European universities including Berlin and Moscow. He was called to the bar at both Lincoln's Inn and the Middle Temple, but never practised as a barrister.

In 1896 he married Ethel Sealby Ismay, the daughter of Thomas Henry Ismay who founded the White Star Line. They had two sons, one of whom, Charles Hardinge Drage (1897–1983), served in the Royal Navy, attaining the rank of Commander, and in later years wrote a number of biographies.

== Career ==
Drage became a prolific writer and commentator of public affairs, particularly on poverty, labour relations and the training of sailors.

From 1891 to 1894 he was secretary to the Royal Commission on labour relations.

Drage was elected at the 1895 general election as one of the two Members of Parliament for Derby. He and Sir Henry Howe Bemrose had unseated the town's two sitting Liberal MPs, including the Chancellor of the Exchequer Sir William Vernon Harcourt. The election was a nationwide rout for the Liberals, who lost a third of their seats in the House of Commons, but in a letter to The Times newspaper Drage attributed his success to his own campaigning efforts in Derby. In six months of campaigning he had addressed at least one meeting of working men every week, offering what he called "practical answers" to labour problems.

He lost his seat at the next general election, in 1900 and never returned to Parliament. He contested Cleveland at the 1902 by-election, Woolwich at the 1903 by-election, Blackburn at the 1906 general election, but was unsuccessful in each case.

In 1897 he was a member of the International Congress on Housing of the Working Classes, in Brussels, and in 1900 of the International Congress on Poor Law and Charity, in Paris. In 1906 he became President of the Central Poor Law Conference.

From 1910 to 1919 he was an alderman of London County Council.

During World War I he served from 1914 in the military intelligence section of the War Office.

== Antisemitism controversy ==
In 1923 Drage was involved in a controversy over antisemitism when in an entry for Poland in the Encyclopaedia Britannica he wrote, "The Eastern Jew is essentially a business or commercial man, but rarely a producer. He is usually a middleman or intermediary. In towns, the majority of the shops are owned by Jews, but they are a race apart, hated and despised by the rest of the population, devoted to their religion, which is a primitive type of Judaism.

"... The Tsarist Government drove the Jews out of Russia, but gave them exceptional advantages in Poland. During and after the war the hostility to the Jews was increased by the fact that in the German occupation the Jew was the willing tool of the invader and by the close connection between the Jews and Bolshevism. The hostility to the Jew was marked in 1918 and 1919 by excesses in which some 200 or 300 have in fact been killed, but which have been enormously exaggerated by the Jewish Press.

"Captain Peter Wright, in his very valuable and interesting report, states that the great majority of the poor Jews are of the Eastern type and extreme orthodoxy (Chassidism). They form an immense mass of squalid and helpless poverty. They are driven into all sorts of illicit and fraudulent practices.

"They are unfit for the modern economic world for want of education and for Western society because of their habits and want of cleanliness."

According to The New York Times "The Jewish Tribune analyzes the article as to its authoritativeness, its impartiality, its accuracy, and concludes that none of these elements exists, adding, "we have shown that in its treatment of a vital question affecting millions of human beings the Encyclopaedia has violated the elementary principles of encyclopaedia compilation."

== Works ==
- Drage, Geoffrey (1885). The Criminal Code of the German Empire. Translated, with prolegomena and a commentary. London: Chapman and Hall.
- Drage, Geoffrey (1889). Cyril. A romantic novel. London: W. H. Allen & Co.
- Drage, Geoffrey (1890). Eton and the Empire. An address, etc. Eton: R. I. Drake.
- Drage, Geoffrey (1894). The unemployed. Macmillan.
- Drage, Geoffrey (1894). Eton and the Labour Question. An address, etc. Eton: R. I. Drake.
- Drage, Geoffrey (1895). Problem of the Aged Poor. Black.
- Drage, Geoffrey (1896). The Labour Problem. Smith Elder.
- Drage, Geoffrey (1904). Russian affairs. Murray.
- Drage, Geoffrey (1905). Trade unions. Methuen.
- Drage, Geoffrey (1909). Austria-Hungary. Murray.
- Drage, Geoffrey (1909), Lord Acton (ed.), "Russia and the Levant: Russia under Nicholas I", The Cambridge Modern History, vol. XI: The Growth of Nationalities, Cambridge University Press
- Drage, Geoffrey (1909), Lord Acton (ed.), "Russia and the Levant after the Crimean War: Russia and the Period of Reform", The Cambridge Modern History, vol. XI: The Growth of Nationalities, Cambridge University Press
- Drage, Geoffrey (1909), Lord Acton (ed.), "Russia and the Levant after the Crimean War: Russian Literature (1800–1900)", The Cambridge Modern History, vol. XI: The Growth of Nationalities, Cambridge University Press
- Drage, Geoffrey (1911). The imperial organization of trade. Smith Elder.
- Drage, Geoffrey (1914). The State and the Poor. London: Collin's-Clear-Type-Press.
- Drage, Geoffrey (1915). Ephemera : [a collection of speeches and essays].
- Drage, Geoffrey (1930). Public assistance. Murray.
- Drage, Geoffrey (1931). Sea power. Murray.

Parliament of the United Kingdom
Preceded by Thomas Roe; Sir William Vernon Harcourt	Member of Parliament for Derby; 1895 – 1900; With: Sir Henry Howe Bemrose	Succeeded by Sir Thomas Roe; Richard Bell
