= Richard Luce (surgeon) =

Major-General Sir Richard Luce KCMG CB FRCS
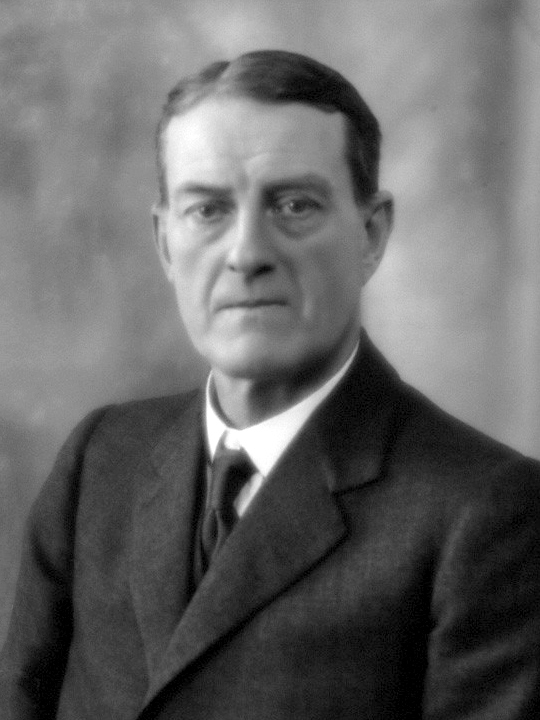
- Luce in 1928

Member of Parliament for Derby
- In office 29 October 1924 – 29 May 1929 Serving with J. H. Thomas
- Preceded by: William Raynes
- Succeeded by: William Raynes

Personal details
- Born: 13 July 1867 Halcombe, Malmesbury
- Died: 21 February 1952 (aged 84) Romsey, Hampshire
- Party: Unionist Party
- Relations: Rear-Admiral John Luce (brother)
- Education: Christ's College, Cambridge
- Occupation: Surgeon

Military service
- Allegiance: United Kingdom
- Branch/service: British Army
- Rank: Major-General
- Battles/wars: First World War
- Awards: Knight Commander of the Order of St Michael and St George; Companion of the Order of the Bath; Mentioned in Despatches

Major-General Sir Richard Harman Luce, KCMG, CB, FRCS (13 July 1867 – 21 February 1952) was a British surgeon, British Army officer and politician. During the First World War, he served as the Director of Medical Services of the Egyptian Expeditionary Force. He was elected MP for Derby in 1924.

Luce was for many years the senior surgeon and later the consulting surgeon to the Derbyshire Royal Infirmary. He was educated at Clifton College, from where he went to Christ's College, Cambridge, gaining a first class honours in natural science. As a student at Guy's Hospital in London, he qualified in 1893. He later made his home in Derby.

== Life and career ==
Luce was born at Halcombe, Malmesbury, the second son of Colonel Charles Richard Luce and Mary Visger, daughter of Harmon Visger. He was the elder brother of Rear Admiral John Luce.

Luce was appointed surgeon-lieutenant in the 1st Volunteer Battalion the Sherwood Foresters, (Derbyshire Regiment), 27 October 1897. While in the Territorial Force Reserve, Army Medical Service, he was appointed to the Honorary Colonelcy of the Royal Army Medical Corps of the Territorial Force in the North Midland Territorial Division, 5 November 1913.

Luce served in the First World War in Egypt, Gallipoli and Palestine, 1914–19 as Assistant Director, Deputy Director and Director of Medical Services and, in 1918–1919, he was made a major general, becoming Director of Medical Services in the Egyptian Expeditionary Force. His war service was illustrious, being mentioned in despatches and he was appointed a Companion of the Order of the Bath on 3 June 1916, a Companion of the Order of St Michael and St George in 1918 and was knighted as a Knight Commander of the Order of St Michael and St George in 1919.

At the Derbyshire Royal Infirmary, Luce built up a reputation as an operating surgeon, where he was active in promoting plans for new building work. He was also a surgeon to the Derbyshire Children's Hospital, as well as Ripley and Wirksworth cottage hospitals.

In 1924, Luce was elected as a Unionist MP for his adopted town of Derby. He was Mayor of Romsey, 1935–37. He wrote books about Malmesbury Abbey and Romsey Abbey. He also published a Paper (RAMC/2031) in the Journal of the Royal Army Medical Corps, 1936–1937, on "War experiences of a Territorial Medical Officer (ADMS, 2nd Mounted Division, Egypt, 1915–1919)" with photographs.

Luce retired to Romsey, where he died in February 1952, and was buried in the churchyard of Romsey Abbey. He was described in his obituary as being a man who had "exceptional energy and enthusiasm but was always courteous, modest and kindly in demeanour".

Luce's great-great-niece is actress and comedian Miranda Hart.
