= Max Bemrose =

English industrialist and politician (1904-1986)

Sir John Maxwell Bemrose (1 July 1904 – 13 July 1986), known as Sir Max Bemrose, was an English industrialist, politician, and county officer for Derbyshire.

== Early life ==
The younger son of Dr Henry Howe Bemrose, of Derby, and the grandson of Sir Henry Howe Bemrose (1827–1911), who in the 1890s had been member of parliament for Derby, Bemrose was educated at Derby School, Brighton College; and Clare College, Cambridge, where he graduated BA and MA in the school of Economics.

== Career ==
Bemrose joined the family printing firm, Bemrose Corporation Ltd, in 1926, and was a director of the firm from 1938 to 1979 and its chairman, 1953 to 1978. He chaired the national Printing and Publishing Industry Training Board from 1972 to 1977 and was twice President of the British Federation of Master Printers, in 1967–1968 and again in 1971–1972.

In Conservative politics, Bemrose became prospective parliamentary candidate for Derby in 1938 and there fought the General Election of 1945. In 1950, he contested Watford for the Conservatives. He served as the party's chairman for its East Midlands Provincial Area from 1957 to 1961 and chaired the National Union of Conservative and Unionist Associations in 1964–1965. He was knighted in the 1960 Queen's Birthday Honours.

Appointed a Deputy Lieutenant of Derbyshire in 1967, he served as High Sheriff of Derbyshire for 1969–1970.

Bemrose School, in Uttoxeter New Road, Derby, was named after the Bemrose family to mark its services to education.

== Private life ==
In 1933, Max Bemrose married Margaret Le Mare, a violinist who had studied music and singing in Dresden and Copenhagen, and together they adopted one son, Tony, and one daughter, Paddi.

In 1952 the family moved to 'Hazelbrow', Duffield. In Who's Who 1986, his recreations were stated as "music, gardening", his address as Old Barn House, Nether Lane, Hazelwood Road, Duffield, Derbyshire, and his clubs as the Carlton and the Lansdowne.

Bemrose himself died in 1986, but his widow survived him for many years, celebrating her hundredth birthday on 7 May 2008. An interview with Lady Bemrose in the Derby Evening Telegraph for her birthday described her life in music and her travels with her husband in America, South Africa, Australia, Egypt and Israel. She said "When we visited Egypt, I had to restrain my husband from diving into the Nile."

== Honours ==
- Knighted, 1960 Queen's Birthday Honours
- Deputy Lieutenant of Derbyshire, 1967
- High Sheriff of Derbyshire for 1969–1970
