= William More (by 1511 – 1568 or later) =

English politician

William More (by 1511 – 1568 or later) was an English politician.

He was a member (MP) of the Parliament of England for Derby in November 1554 and 1563.
