= Henry Howe Bemrose =

British printer, publisher and politician

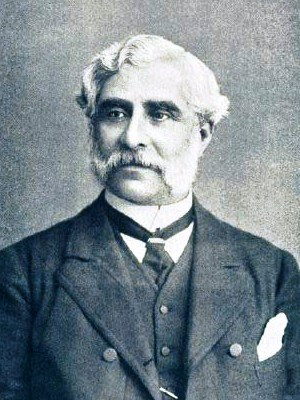
H.H.Bemrose

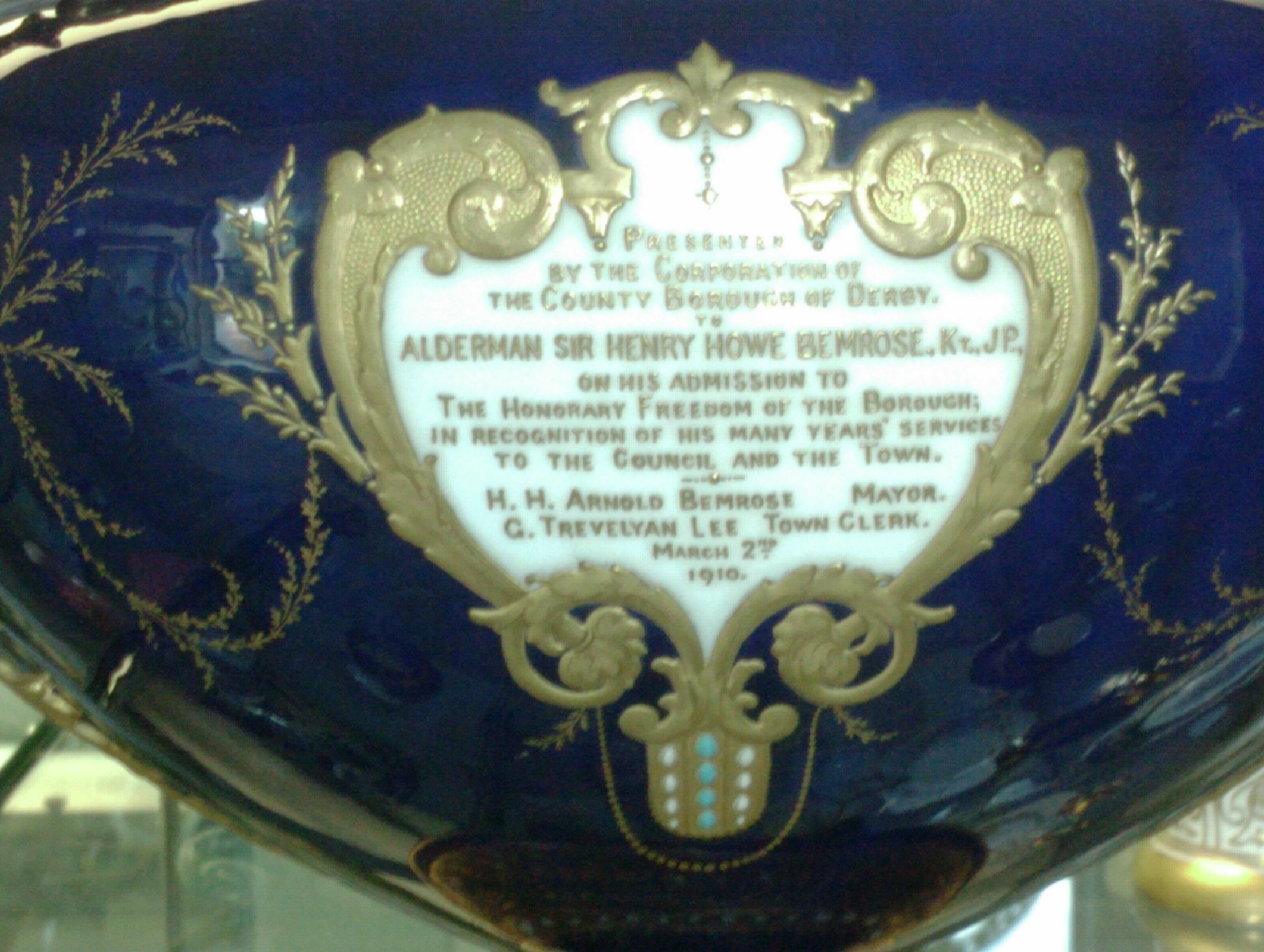
reverse of commemorative cup in Derby Museum records his freedom of the borough in 1910.

Sir Henry Howe Bemrose (19 November 1827 – 4 May 1911) was a British printer and publisher, as well as mayor and later Conservative Member of Parliament for Derby.

== Life ==
Bemrose was the first son of William Bemrose, and was educated at Derby School and King William's College, in the Isle of Man.

He and his brother William Jnr became partners in his father's printing firm in Derby in 1858. He took over as chairman of the family firm of William Bemrose & Sons, printers of Derby and London and was a director of Parr's Derby Bank. He was active in many walks of public life, including the church and charitable organisations. After serving as Mayor of Derby in 1877–1878, he became Member of Parliament for Derby from 1895 to 1900.

In 1855, he married Charlotte, daughter of William Brindley, of Derby. They had one son and five daughters. The son, also named Henry (b. 1857), but known as Arnold, came into the family printing business in 1879. Henry senior was the grandfather of Sir Max Bemrose.

Henry Arnold rose to be Mayor of Derby and in 1910 he had the honour of awarding his father the Freedom of the Borough. A Derby porcelain commemorative cup recorded the event and it is now in Derby Museum and Art Gallery

After his death his library was bought after the money was raised from the public. The Library was extended to make room for this addition. He left an estate worth about £90,000.

== Honours ==
- Knighted, August 1897
- Freedom of the Borough of Derby, received 1910

Parliament of the United Kingdom
Preceded by Thomas Roe and William Vernon Harcourt	Member of Parliament for Derby; 1895–1900; With: Geoffrey Drage	Succeeded by Richard Bell and Thomas Roe
