= Peter Eure =

English politician

Peter Eure or Evers (ca. 1549–1612), of London and Washingborough, Lincolnshire, was an English politician.

He was a member (MP) of the parliament of England for Lincoln in 1589 and Derby in 1601.
