= 1892 Derby by-election =

UK Parliamentary by-election

The 1892 Derby by-election was a Parliamentary by-election held on 24 August 1892. The constituency returned two Members of Parliament (MP) to the House of Commons of the United Kingdom, elected by the first past the post voting system.

== Vacancy ==
Under the provisions of the Succession to the Crown Act 1707 and a number of subsequent Acts, MPs appointed to certain ministerial and legal offices were at this time required to seek re-election. The by-election in Derby was caused by the appointment on 18 August 1892 of the sitting Liberal MP, Sir William Harcourt as Chancellor of the Exchequer.

Harcourt had been a Member of Parliament for the constituency since an 1880 by-election.

== Candidates ==
The Liberal Party re-selected Sir William Harcourt to defend the seat.

Henry Farmer-Atkinson stood as an independent candidate. Farmer-Atkinson had been the Conservative Member of Parliament for Boston from 1886 until the 1892 general election.

His candidature was described by contemporary sources as "a meaningless candidature", "absurd", and "erratic".

The Conservative Party did not contest the seat. The executive committee of the Derby Conservative Association passed a resolution on 20 August resolving to take no part in the contest and disclaiming Farmer-Atkinson's candidature.

== Campaign ==
Harcourt arrived in Derby on Monday 22 August, two days before the poll, and addressed a meeting that evening. He delivered two speeches at the works of the Midland Railway Company on Tuesday 23 August. It was estimated that 40 per cent of the electorate worked for the Midland Railway.

Farmer-Atkinson arrived in Derby on Monday 22 August. He addressed a meeting at Derby Drill hall that evening. His canvass was described as "crazy".

== Result ==
1892 Derby by-election
| Party | Candidate | Votes | % | ±% |
|---|---|---|---|---|
| Liberal | William Harcourt | 6,508 | 80.1 | +22.4 |
| Independent | Henry Farmer-Atkinson | 1,619 | 19.9 | New |
| Majority | | 4,889 | 60.2 | +53.1 |
| Turnout | | 8,127 | 51.6 | −32.0 |
| Registered electors | | 15,754 | | |
| Liberal hold | | Swing | | |
