= Charles Roberts (British politician) =

British radical Liberal politician

Charles Henry Roberts
- Photograph of Roberts, 1917

Member of Parliament for Derby
- In office 1922–1923 Serving with J. H. Thomas
- Preceded by: J. H. Thomas; Albert Green
- Succeeded by: J. H. Thomas; William Raynes

Member of Parliament for Lincoln
- In office 1906–1918
- Preceded by: Charles Seely
- Succeeded by: Alfred Davies

Comptroller of the Household
- In office 1915–1916
- Preceded by: The Lord Saye and Sele
- Succeeded by: Sir Edwin Cornwall, Bt

Under-Secretary of State for India
- In office 1914–1915
- Preceded by: Edwin Montagu
- Succeeded by: The Lord Islington

Personal details
- Born: 22 August 1865
- Died: 25 June 1959 (aged 93)
- Political party: Liberal
- Spouse: Lady Cecilia Maude Howard (m. 1891; died 1947)
- Children: Wilfrid Roberts; Winifred Nicholson
- Education: Marlborough College
- Alma mater: Balliol College, Oxford

Charles Roberts, 1910

Charles Henry Roberts (22 August 1865 – 25 June 1959) was a British radical Liberal politician.

== Early life ==
Roberts was the son of Reverend Albert James Roberts, Vicar of Tidebrook, Sussex and Ellen Wace of Wadhurst, Sussex and was educated at Marlborough College and Balliol College, Oxford.

He was a fellow of Exeter College, Oxford, where he taught from 1889 to 1895.

== Career ==
He was the unsuccessful Liberal candidate for Wednesbury in the 1895 general election and for Lincoln in 1900. He was elected to Parliament for Lincoln in the 1906 general election and reelected in both elections in 1910.

He served under H. H. Asquith as Under-Secretary of State for India 1914 to 1915. He was then made both Comptroller of the Household and Chairman of the National Health Insurance Joint Committee from 1915 to 1916.

He lost his seat in 1918 when the Coalition Government gave endorsement to his Unionist opponent, but returned briefly to the House of Commons in 1922 when he was elected for Derby. However, he lost this seat in the 1923 general election and retired from national politics.

He afterwards committed himself to work creation schemes in Cumberland, reopening collieries and starting brickworks, limeworks and quarries. He also became involved in farming. From 1938 to 1958 he was chairman of Cumberland County Council and the Cumberland branch of the National Farmers' Union. He also chaired the Aborigines' Protection Society. He was Chairman of the Cumberland War Agricultural Committee, 1939–47. He served as a Justice of the Peace in Cumberland from 1900 to 1950 and was Deputy Chairman of Cumberland Quarter Sessions until 1950.

== Personal life ==
On 7 April 1891, he was married Lady Cecilia Maude Howard, daughter of George Howard, 9th Earl of Carlisle. They had one son and two daughters, including.

- Rosa Winifred Roberts (1893–1981), an artist who married the English painter Ben Nicholson.
- Wilfrid Hubert Wace Roberts (1900–1991), a Liberal MP who married three times.

Lady Cecilia died in 1947. Roberts died on 25 June 1959.

=== Election results ===
General election 1900 Lincoln Electorate 8,846
| Party | Candidate | Votes | % | ±% |
|---|---|---|---|---|
| Liberal Unionist | Charles Seely | 4,002 | 50.4 | |
| Liberal | Charles Roberts | 3,935 | 49.6 | |
| Majority | | 67 | 0.8 | |
| Turnout | | | | |
| Conservative hold | | Swing | | |

General election 1906 Lincoln Electorate 10,645
| Party | Candidate | Votes | % | ±% |
|---|---|---|---|---|
| Liberal | Charles Roberts | 5,110 | 51.2 | +1.6 |
| Liberal Unionist | Charles Seely | 3,718 | 37.2 | −3.2 |
| Conservative | Henry Page Croft | 1,162 | 11.6 | n/a |
| Majority | | 1,392 | 14.0 | 14.8 |
| Turnout | | | 93.8 | |
| Liberal gain from Conservative | | Swing | +7.4 | |

General election January 1910 Lincoln Electorate
| Party | Candidate | Votes | % | ±% |
|---|---|---|---|---|
| Liberal | Charles Roberts | 5,402 | 50.2 | −1.0 |
| Conservative | Robert Filmer | 3,236 | 30.1 | +18.5 |
| Liberal Unionist | Charles Seely | 2,129 | 19.8 | −17.4 |
| Majority | | 2,166 | 20.1 | +6.1 |
| Turnout | | 10,767 | | |
| Liberal hold | | Swing | | |

General election December 1910 Lincoln Electorate
| Party | Candidate | Votes | % | ±% |
|---|---|---|---|---|
| Liberal | Charles Roberts | 5,484 | 52.9 | +2.7 |
| Conservative | Robert Filmer | 4,878 | 47.1 | +17.0 |
| Majority | | 606 | 5.8 | −14.3 |
| Turnout | | 10,362 | | |
| Liberal hold | | Swing | -7.1 | |

General election 1918: Lincoln Electorate 31,365
| Party | Candidate | Votes | % | ±% |
|---|---|---|---|---|
| Unionist | Alfred Davies | 11,114 | 47.7 | +0.6 |
| Labour | Robert Taylor | 6,658 | 28.5 | n/a |
| Liberal | Charles Roberts | 5,550 | 23.8 | −29.1 |
| Majority | | 4,456 | 19.2 | 25.0 |
| Turnout | | | 74.4 | |
| Unionist gain from Liberal | | Swing | +14.8 | |

Parliament of the United Kingdom
| Preceded by Charles Seely | Member of Parliament for Lincoln; 1906–1918 | Succeeded by Alfred Davies |
| Preceded by J. H. Thomas; Albert Green | Member of Parliament for Derby; 1922–1923; With: J. H. Thomas | Succeeded by J. H. Thomas; William Raynes |
Political offices
| Preceded by Edwin Montagu | Under-Secretary of State for India; 1914–1915 | Succeeded by The Lord Islington |
| Preceded by The Lord Saye and Sele | Comptroller of the Household; 1915–1916 | Succeeded by Sir Edwin Cornwall, Bt |
