= Richard Bell (MP for Derby) =

British politician

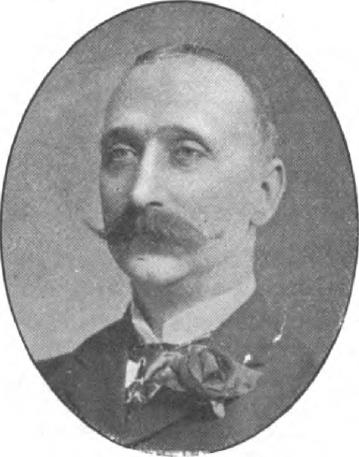

Member of the British Parliament for Derby
- In office 1900–1910

Personal details
- Born: 1859 Merthyr Tydfil, Wales
- Died: 1 May 1930 (aged 70–71)
- Party: Labour

Richard Bell (1859 – 1 May 1930) was one of the first two British Labour Members of Parliament, and the first for an English constituency, elected after the formation of the Labour Representation Committee in 1900.

Bell was born in Merthyr Tydfil and became a high-profile trade unionist, the general secretary of the Amalgamated Society of Railway Servants. He was elected for Derby, a two-member constituency, alongside a Liberal in the 1900 general election. He sympathised with the Liberals on most issues, except those that directly affected his union. This meant that he was not very compatible with the other Labour MP, Keir Hardie, a committed socialist member of the Independent Labour Party.

Although its chairman in 1902–03, by 1903 Bell was struggling to adhere to the rules of the LRC group in Parliament, which now had five members following a series of by-elections. By 1904 he was considered to have lapsed from the group and was associated with the Liberal Party. He was re-elected at the 1906 general election.

His supporters in the Derby Trades Council became disillusioned with Bell and replaced him at the January 1910 general election with another trade unionist from the ASRS, Jimmy Thomas. After leaving Parliament, Bell joined the Employment Exchange branch of the Board of Trade. He retired from that in 1920 but continued in local politics and served as a member of the Southgate Urban District Council 1922–29.

== Industrial interests ==
In 1903, Bell joined William John Parry in forming North Wales Quarries Ltd. which owned three slate quarries in Bethesda, Gwynedd. These were intended to be run co-operatively with the workers, most of whom were on strike against the owners of the nearby Penrhyn Quarry. The three-year strike against Penrhyn was the longest industrial dispute in British history, and brought great hardship to the 2,000 quarrymen who were locked out. The operation of Pantdreiniog, Moel Faban and Tanybwlch quarries failed to provide a lasting model of co-operation, but they did keep many skilled quarrymen from emigrating to the United States.

Parliament of the United Kingdom
| Preceded by Geoffrey Drage and Henry Howe Bemrose | Member of Parliament for Derby; 1900–1910; With: Sir Thomas Roe | Succeeded by James Henry Thomas and Sir Thomas Roe |
Trade union offices
| Preceded by Edward Harford | General Secretary of the Amalgamated Society of Railway Servants; 1897–1909 | Succeeded by J. E. Williams |
| Preceded by W. Boyd Hornidge | President of the Trades Union Congress; 1904 | Succeeded by James Sexton |
Party political offices
| Preceded by Allan Gee | Chair of the Labour Party; 1902–1903 | Succeeded by John Hodge |
