= 1936 Derby by-election =

UK Parliamentary by-election

| ← 1935 | 9 July 1936 | 1945 → |

Constituency of Derby
- Turnout: 65.5%
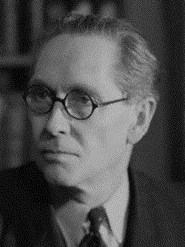

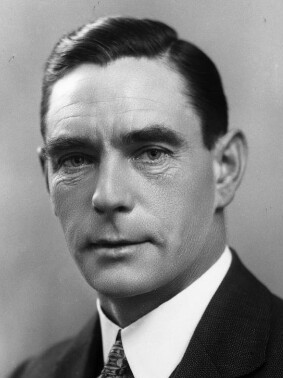
| | First party | Second party |
|---|---|---|
| Candidate | Philip Noel-Baker | Archibald Church |
| Party | Labour | National Labour |
| Popular vote | 28,419 | 25,666 |
| Percentage | 52.5% | 47.5% |
MP before election
J. H. Thomas
National Labour
Elected MP
Philip Noel-Baker
Labour

The 1936 Derby by-election was held on 9 July 1936. It was held due to the resignation of the incumbent National Labour MP, J. H. Thomas, and the seat was gained by the Labour candidate Philip Noel-Baker.

== Background ==
Derby had been represented by J.H. Thomas since 1910, a seat he held jointly with several other people because Derby was a two-member constituency until 1950. In 1936, Thomas was forced to resign from the government after being caught giving away secrets in the budget through coded messages. That was uncovered after he shouted "tee up" whilst golfing, to indicate a rise in tea tax. Thomas chose to step down from the House of Commons by being appointed as the Crown Steward and Bailiff of the Chiltern Hundreds, an office of profit under the Crown which disqualifies MPs and causes a vacancy in their constituency.

== Election ==
National Labour selected Archibald Church to follow on as the Derby candidate. Church had previously been an MP for Leyton East and Wandsworth Central. Philip Noel-Baker was chosen to represent Labour and had the support of Liberal former Prime Minister David Lloyd George. The election was primarily fought on the issue of the British response to the Italian invasion of Abyssinia. Church's campaign had been damaged by Lord Allen of Hurtwood stating that "the National Government is no longer fit to represent the nation". Noel-Baker won the election and went on to represent Derby, and the successor constituency of Derby South, until 1970.

Derby by-election, 1936
| Party | Candidate | Votes | % | ±% |
|---|---|---|---|---|
| Labour | Philip Noel-Baker | 28,419 | 52.5 | +12.8 |
| National Labour | Archibald Church | 25,666 | 47.5 | +17.4 |
| Majority | | 2,753 | 5.0 | N/A |
| Turnout | | 54,085 | 65.5 | |
| Labour gain from National Labour | | Swing | | |
