= William Allan Reid =

British politician (1865–1952)

William Allan Reid (11 October 1865 – 17 March 1952) was a British Conservative Party politician, who served as one of the two Members of Parliament (MPs) for Derby from the 1931 general election until the 1945 general election.

Parliament of the United Kingdom
| Preceded by William Robert Raynes and James Henry Thomas | Member of Parliament for Derby; 1931–1945; With: James Henry Thomas to 1936; Philip Noel-Baker from 1936 | Succeeded by Clifford Wilcock and Philip Noel-Baker |
