= Albert Green (British politician) =

British politician

Albert Green (3 November 1874 – 25 September 1941) was a British Conservative Party politician.

At the 1918 general election he was elected as a Member of Parliament (MP) for Derby, winning the second of the city's two seats. He had a narrow margin of only 2.2% of the votes over his Liberal Party opponent W.B. Rowbotham, and at the next general election, in 1922, he was defeated by the Liberal candidate Charles Henry Roberts.

After losing his seat, Green did not stand for Parliament again. He also served as Mayor of Derby and founded Albert Green Ltd, a textile manufacturers based in Normanton, Derby.

Parliament of the United Kingdom
| Preceded by William Collins and J. H. Thomas | Member of Parliament for Derby; 1918 – 1922; With: J. H. Thomas | Succeeded by Charles Roberts and J. H. Thomas |
