= William Raynes =

British politician

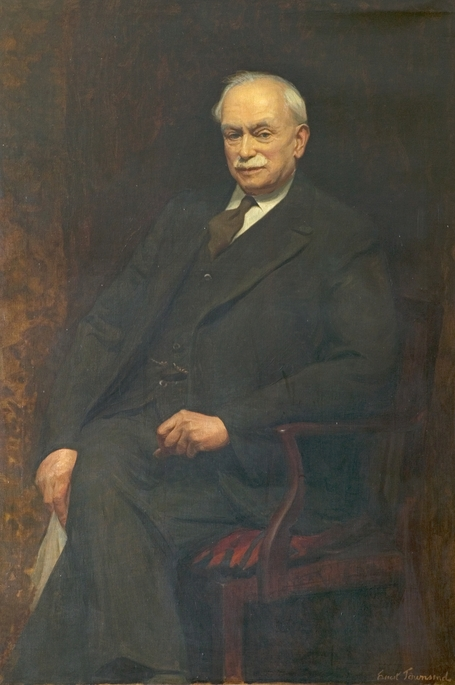
William Robert Raynes by Ernest Townsend

William Robert Raynes (26 January 1871 – 30 January 1966) was a British politician. He was a socialist Member of Parliament, alderman and Mayor of Derby. He helped plan a scheme for the River Derwent and there is a major road in Derby – Raynesway – that is named after him.

== Life ==
Raynes was born on 26 January 1871 at Chasetown, Staffordshire, England. He was the son of Derbyshire-born Henry Eley Raynes and Phebe Raynes. The family moved many times during William's childhood and he was educated at nine different schools in nine different parts of the country.

The family moved to Osmaston, then outside the Borough of Derby in 1883. William's first job, after leaving school at the age of 13, was with the local Co-operative Society.

Later he became a painter and decorator, living at 13 Commerce Street in nearby Alvaston.

In October 1911 he was selected to be the Labour party candidate for Osmaston Ward when a by-election was called following the untimely death of Councillor Edwin Goldsmith. As the winning candidate in the by-election, he became Derby's first Labour councillor.

In May 1919, Raynes made a speech where he called for the withdrawal of British troops from the Russian civil war. Raynes' speech also praised the Soviet Union's educational policy, adding "If that is Bolshevism then I am a Bolshevik." In response, the right-wing magazine John Bull called Raynes "a dangerous fool and an unholy liar", and added "Derby should spew such a man...out from its midst."

As one of the longest serving members of the council, he was nominated as the town's first Labour mayor in 1921 without opposition from the other parties.

He was a Member of Parliament for Derby from 6 December 1923 to 29 October 1924 and again between 1929 and 1931 but his greatest work was in local government.

He moved to 85 Empress Road, Rose Hill around 1930 and was by then a Justice of the Peace.

Alderman Raynes instigated many local projects including the Riverlands scheme in 1929, the 1932 flood prevention scheme and the Outer Ring Road.

The Riverlands scheme involved straightening and clearing the tortuous course of the River Derwent downstream of Derby. The work was completed in 1934 at a cost of £300,000. It was expected to prevent the periodic flooding of large tracts of land in close proximity. Derby Corporation gained 800 acres of building land for industrial purposes as a result.

His name is commemorated in Raynesway, the section of the Derby Outer Ring Road, across the newly drained land between Chaddesden and Alvaston, opened on 28 September 1938 by the mayor of Derby, Mr E.E. Paulson.

Alderman Raynes was still active in postwar politics in Derby, being present at the opening of the new council chamber in 1954. He died on 30 January 1966 aged 95.

Parliament of the United Kingdom
Preceded by Charles Roberts; J. H. Thomas	Member of Parliament for Derby; 1923 – 1924; With: J. H. Thomas	Succeeded by J. H. Thomas; Richard Luce
Preceded by J. H. Thomas; Richard Luce	Member of Parliament for Derby; 1929 – 1931; With: J. H. Thomas	Succeeded by J. H. Thomas; William Allan Reid
