= Robert Ireland (MP for Derby, 1417) =

English politician

Robert Ireland (died before 1 November 1435) was an English politician who sat as MP for Derby in 1417.

He was the son of Robert Ireland and the grandson of Sir Robert Ireland, who represented Derbyshire in 1341. He married Dulcie and had one son.

In March 1414 and from 31 May to 5 June 1414, he went to serve at the inquests held into lollardy. He attended the county elections in 1411, 1413, 1414, 1419, 1429 and 1431.
