= John Collings (MP) =

14th-century English politician

John Collings (fl. 1328) was an English Member of Parliament. He represented Derby in 1328.
