= William Pakeman =

English politician

William Pakeman (died before 1411) was an English politician. He sat as MP for Derby in 1373, 1381, October 1383, February 1388 and September 1388. He also served as tax collector of Derby in March 1377 and May 1379, commissioner of arrest in Derby in June 1380, bailiff of Derby from Michaelmas 1389 until 1390 and as alderman in 1390 until 1391.

Before 1364, he married Margery and had one daughter.
