= John Bowyer (MP for Derby) =

English politician, (fl. 1383)

John Bowyer MP
- Years active: 1383
- Known for: Member of Parliament for Derby

John Bowyer was an English politician and in 1383 was Member of Parliament for Derby.
