= Thomas Roe, 1st Baron Roe =

British politician

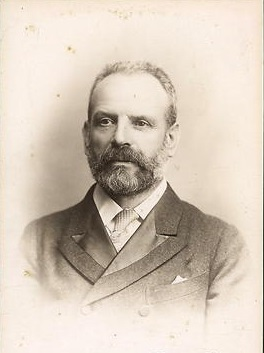
Thomas Roe

Thomas Roe, 1st Baron Roe (13 July 1832 – 7 June 1923), known as Sir Thomas Roe between 1894 and 1917, was a British businessman and Liberal politician, particularly associated with the town of Derby.

== Background and early life ==
Of a modest background, Roe was the son of Thomas Roe, a timber merchant and Mayor of Derby, and his wife Deborah, daughter of Absalom Oakley. He began to work in the office of his father's company, Messr Roe & Sons, timber merchants, at the age of fourteen and became a partner at the age of twenty-two.

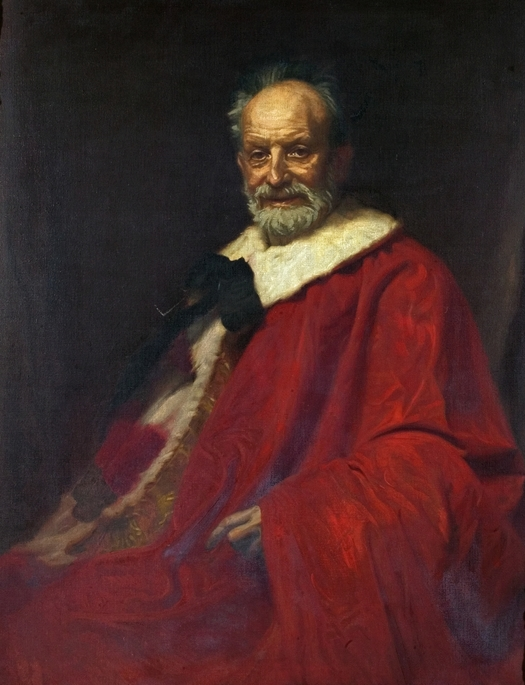
"The Late Lord Roe" by Ernest Townsend

== Political career ==
At the age of 26 he became a member of the Derby Town Council and served as Mayor of Derby from 1864 to 1865. He was particularly interested in education, and was one of the original members of the Derby School Board in 1870 and later served as Chairman of the Education Committee of the town council. He entered Parliament for Derby in an 1883 by-election, a seat he held until he was defeated at the 1895 general election. Roe was again Mayor of Derby from 1896 to 1897 and returned to the House of Commons at the 1900 general election, when he was once again elected for Derby. Mayor of Derby for a third time from 1910 to 1911 he retired from the House of Commons in 1916. He was knighted in 1894 and in 1917 he was raised to the peerage as Baron Roe, of the Borough of Derby.

== Personal life ==
Roe married, in 1903 at the age of 71, Emily Kirtley, daughter of Matthew Kirtley. The marriage was childless and she died in July 1909. Roe survived her by fourteen years and died in June 1923, aged 90, when the barony became extinct.

Parliament of the United Kingdom
Preceded by Michael Thomas Bass; Sir William Harcourt	Member of Parliament for Derby; 1883–1895; With: Sir William Harcourt	Succeeded by Sir Henry Bemrose; Geoffrey Drage
Preceded by Sir Henry Howe Bemrose; Geoffrey Drage	Member of Parliament for Derby; 1900–1916; With: Richard Bell 1900–1910; J. H. Thomas 1910–1916	Succeeded by J. H. Thomas; William Collins
Peerage of the United Kingdom
New creation	Baron Roe; 1917–1923	Extinct
