= John Baxter (MP for Derby) =

English lawyer and politician

John Baxter (died c. 1611) was an English lawyer and politician who sat in the House of Commons between 1601 and 1611.

Baxter may have been the son of Henry Baxter of Cannock, Staffordshire. He studied for the law entering either Gray's Inn in 1565 or Middle Temple from New Inn in 1568. He was called to the bar in 1585. He became gaoler for Derbyshire in 1588 and was steward of Derby in 1599. In 1601, he was elected Member of Parliament for Derby. He was re-elected MP for Derby in 1604. He was clerk of the peace for Derbyshire by 1606.

Baxter died by May 1611 when a replacement was sought for his position as clerk.

Parliament of England
Preceded by Henry Duport; Robert Stringer	Member of Parliament for Derby; 1601–1611; With: Peter Eure 1601; Edmund Sleighe 1604–1611	Succeeded by Gilbert Kniveton; Arthur Turnor
