= Richard Sherman (MP) =

Member of the Parliament of England

Member of Parliament for Derby
- In office 1391–1393 Serving with Thomas Docking
- Preceded by: John Stokkes; John Hay
- Succeeded by: John Stokkes; Richard Trowell
- In office November 1384 – 1385 Serving with John de Stockes
- Preceded by: Richard de Trowell; John Gibbon
- Succeeded by: Richard Trowell; John Dell

Richard Sherman (fl. 1364–1397) was an English ironmonger and property owner in Derby, who served two terms as a bailiff and served two terms as a member of parliament from Derby, being chosen first in November 1384 (serving with John de Stockes) and again in 1391 (with Thomas Docking).
