= Henry Ainsworth (MP) =

16th-century English politician

- Born: 1502
- Died: 1556 or 1557
- Occupation: politician

Henry Ainsworth (1502 – 1556 or 1557), of Winkburn, Nottinghamshire, was an English politician.

== Biography ==
He was a son of Richard Ainsworth of Preston, Lancashire by Elizabeth. He held the offices of Clerk of the peace, Derbyshire by October 1523-by July 1537 and coroner, Derbyshire by February 1534. "He must have had legal training, although he is not to be found at any inn of court".

Ainsworth was a Member of Parliament for Derby in 1529.
