= Adam le Rede =

English politician

Adam le Rede (fl. 1301) was an English politician.

He was a Member (MP) of the Parliament of England for Derby in 1301 and 1314.

Parliament of England
Preceded by Nicklos de Lorimer; Gervase de Derby	Member of Parliament for Derby; 1301; With: Gervase de Wilnye	Succeeded by John de la Corne; Richard Cardoyl
