= Lawrence Heyworth =

English merchant (1786–1872)

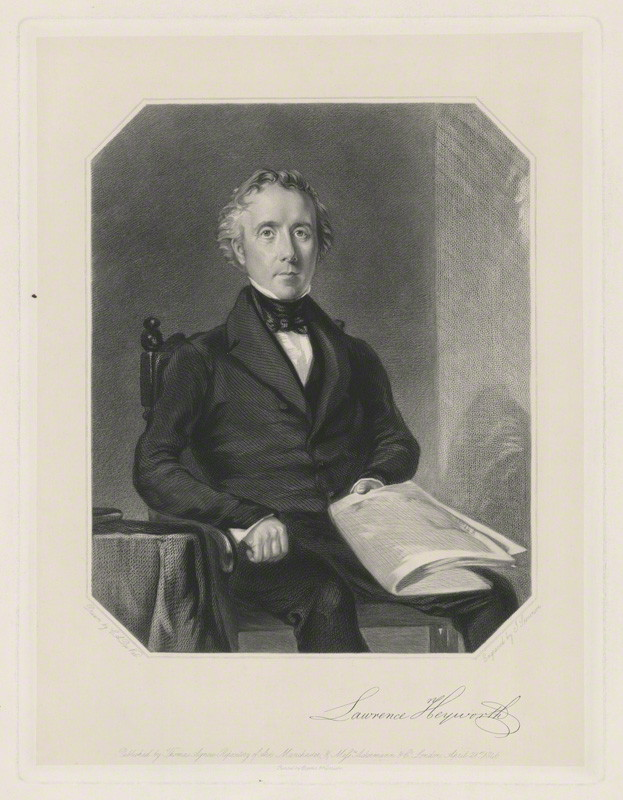
Lawrence Heyworth (1786–1872), c. 1846, after Charles Allen Duval

Lawrence Heyworth (sometimes spelled Laurence Heyworth; 1786 – 19 April 1872) was a merchant based in Liverpool, England, who served as a Member of Parliament (MP) for Derby.

== Early life ==
Lawrence Heyworth was born in 1786 to a prominent family of woollen manufacturers at Greensnook in Bacup, Lancashire. He was the youngest of the four sons of Peter Heyworth and his wife, Elizabeth. Educated at first locally, at a school whose site later became that of the Bacup Mechanics' Institution, Heyworth was subsequently taught at the school of John Fawcett and then at Hipperholme Grammar School, both of which were near to Halifax. His father had died when he was 13 and he left school at 16 to begin work with his brothers in the family business.

== Career ==
=== Trading ===
The Heyworth manufacturing business, called Peter Heyworth & Sons, produced goods intended mainly for export to Spain and Portugal. Lawrence persuaded his brothers that it would be beneficial to deal directly with customers in Lisbon and Porto rather than through agents based in London and elsewhere in Britain. He further persuaded them, with some reluctance, to allow him to do that trading and thus in 1805 he left Bacup for Portugal. There he proved to be a surprising success, making and exploiting contacts to further the business. In 1807, he and his brothers, now trading as Heyworth Brothers & Co., then decided to exploit his apparent flair for foreign dealings by establishing a business as commission agents in Rio de Janeiro. By 1809, with his brother James partnering him, this business had attracted so many consignments from manufacturers in Lancashire and Yorkshire that the brothers set up a shipping and commission agency in Liverpool to handle the trade. This new enterprise was operated by and named after Ormerod Heyworth, leaving one brother to run the Bacup manufactory.

The South American enterprise expanded to include offices in many locations but the British government then attempted to impose tariffs on trade there. In 1816, Heyworth returned to Europe and supervised the opening of alternate trading outlets in Hamburg, Trieste and Livorno. He largely disengaged himself from the business in 1820, when he married his second cousin, Elizabeth Aked, and settled down at a property he had bought the year before. This house, called Yew Tree House and situated in the West Derby area of Liverpool, was set in 60 acres (24 ha) of grounds; he also owned nearby Rice House and its 40 acres (16 ha) of grounds.

=== Railways ===
Heyworth had promotion of railways among his business interests from an early time in their history, and he later persuaded his brothers to dispose of their interests in the family businesses in favour of railway investment: they had withdrawn entirely from trade by 1836.

A Lawrence Heyworth of Liverpool is listed as a director of both the Midland Counties Railway and the South Eastern Railway in 1841, and he was for some time a director of the Central Argentine Railway and chairman of the Kendal and Windermere Railway. He obtained patents relating to steam power in 1838 and was president of Bacup Mechanics' Institution from its foundation in 1839 until his death.

=== Activism ===
Heyworth was a Nonconformist in religious belief and became chairman of the British Anti-State Church Association.

Having opposed the imposition of export duties as early as 1815, when the British government had announced its intention to impose a tariff on goods sent to Rio de Janeiro, Heyworth became a supporter of the Anti-Corn Law League. By the late 1830s, he had become a prominent figure in the free trade movement of northwest England, being both chairman of and the largest donor to the Liverpool Free Trades Association. He had by this time also become involved in the campaign for repeal of the Corporation and other Test Acts. He was an early supporter of the Complete Suffrage Union (CSU), along with fellow Radicals such as Edward Miall and John Bright. Although sharing similar aims to Chartism, Heyworth was among those CSU members who were influenced by Joseph Sturge and objected to the methods of Chartist leaders such as Feargus O'Connor. The influence of Sturge also played a part in his support for the abolition of slavery and his membership of a peace movement called the League of Universal Brotherhood, founded by Elihu Burritt in 1848. Together with Joshua Walmsley, he founded the Financial Reform Association in the same year.

Heyworth was also a temperance campaigner. He supported the National Temperance League and became president of the British Temperance Society, as well as of the British Temperance Emigration Society. The latter association caused him to visit Wisconsin to promote the organisation's purchase of 1,600 acres (650 ha) of settlement land in the Dane and Iowa counties.

=== Politics ===
It was the temperance principle that caused Heyworth not to stand as a parliamentary candidate for the Stafford constituency in 1847. Sources differ regarding whether this decision was made by the electors or by Heyworth himself but agree that the cause was the influence of the brewing industry in that area. Those involved in the industry may have objected to his temperance position, or he may have objected having to take heed of them.

In 1848 Heyworth was elected to the House of Commons as one of the two MPs for the Derby constituency, a candidacy that owed much to his reformist proclivities and to his position as a director of the Midland Railway, which was based in the town. The result of the 1847 general election in the constituency had been declared void because of bribery and in the by-election of August of the following year both he and Michael Thomas Bass, neither of whom had stood in 1847, were elected. Bass was returned again in the 1852 general election but Heyworth came third. In March 1853, Heyworth was awarded the seat on petition when it was determined that Thomas Berry Horsfall had gained victory through bribery. He rarely spoke in the House of Commons, one instance being in support of Richard Cobden, and did not stand for election to parliament in the 1857 general election or thereafter. He retained his interest in reformist politics but was by now an old man and suffering from deafness.

Heyworth died on 19 April 1872, aged 86.

== Family and recognition ==
According to his granddaughter, Beatrice Webb, he married his servant, who died young and whom she could not remember; according to more recent sources, Betsy Aked was a power-loom operator. The couple had six children: Lawrencina (Note: Lawrencina's name is sometimes spelled Lawrencia and Laurencina.) (b. October 1821), Peter George (June 1823), John (October 1824), Elizabeth (October 1825), James Ormerod (July 1827) and Lawrence (February 1831–February 1903).

Lawrencina Heyworth married Richard Potter, a wealthy businessman, and gave birth to Beatrice. In 1842 Lawrencina Heywood became friends with the prolific female novelist, Margaret Oliphant. Oliphant, fourteen at the time and living on Juvenal Street, used Heywood as her model both politically and also copied her writing style (see Margaret Oliphant autobiography edited by Elizabeth Jay, page 26).lll

Heyworth applied for and was granted the right to display arms in 1856, together with the motto Nil dimidium est (Nothing is half). This right extended to all descendants of his father.

The village of Heyworth in Illinois was named after him by grateful officials of the Illinois Central Railroad, of which he was a shareholder.

== Writings ==
Heyworth's writings include:

- Glimpses at the Origin, Mission and Destiny of Man (1866)
- Heyworth, Lawrence (1862). Observations on the substitution of direct for indirect taxation, and the vindication of an income tax: shewing the immense social advantages which the change would confer on the entire human race. J. Holme, Printer. JSTOR 60243466.
- The Expansion of the Suffrage (1861)
- Mr Heyworth's Address to the Members of the Bacup Mechanics (1861)
- Fiscal Policy: Direct and Indirect Taxation Contrasted. 1860. JSTOR 60201683.
- On the Corn Laws and Other Legislative Restrictions. 1843. JSTOR 60205925.
