= El Granadas =

British variety act

El Granadas was a British variety act specialising in rope spinning, active between 1929 and 1971. At the height of their popularity, the husband and wife team of Cecil and Lila Prentice added their son to the act, when they were known as El Granadas and Peter.

== History ==
The act was founded by Cecil Prentice (1903–1971). He was born in West Hartlepool, and made his first stage appearances as a child with his parents, who had a circus and music hall acrobatic act, the Zeimers. He made his London debut with his own rope spinning and bullwhip act in 1921, and worked with a number of partners over the next few years, including Cal McCord, later an actor. In 1926 Prentice joined the Daimlers, a comedy and acrobatic cycling act, through which he met, in 1928, Lillian "Lila" Darbon (1908–2007).

Cecil and Lila formed a double act, at first known as "La Rope and Lady" and, from 1929, as "El Granadas". They specialised in rope spinning and whip manipulating. They were joined in 1943 by their son, Peter Prentice (1928–2017), who was a skilled unicyclist, and the act started to be billed as "El Granadas and Peter". The act continued to grow in popularity, toured widely in Britain, and in 1946 featured as part of the Royal Variety Performance. Entertainer Roy Hudd wrote of the act that ".. they were a good colourful speciality. Nobody slept when they were on." In 1949, Peter Prentice married, and his wife Dorothy (née Croft) joined the team. Peter was then called up for national service, and was replaced for a time by a third woman, Silva Harbord.

In the mid-1950s, Peter and Dorothy left the act, but Cecil and Lila continued it with a succession of female assistants, and then established a separate performing dog act, "Lila and her Komedy Kanines". The two acts continued to operate, to declining audiences, until Cecil Prentice's death in 1971, following a fall into an orchestra pit at Paignton, Devon. Lila Darbon Prentice died in 2007, aged 98, at Brinsworth House in Twickenham.

In 2022, a trick unicycle used by Peter Prentice in his act was restored to working order as part of the BBC TV programme The Repair Shop.
