= William de la Cornere =

13th-century English politician

William de la Cornere (fl. 1294), was an English Member of Parliament (MP).

He was a Member of the Parliament of England for Derby in 1294.

Parliament of England
Preceded by none none	Member of Parliament for Derby; 1294; With: Randalph Makeneye	Succeeded by William Bourne de Dereby; Nicklos de Lorimer
