= Hugh Adam (MP) =

English Member of Parliament in 1388

Hugh Adam was an English politician who was MP for Derby in September 1388. He also served as commissioner of arrest (June 1380) and bailiff (Michaelmas 1380–1381) in his native Derby.
