= James Thatcher (MP) =

16th-century English politician

James Thatcher or Thacker (fl. 1536–1565) was an English politician.

He was a member (MP) of the parliament of England for Derby in 1558.
