= Ralph Shore =

English politician

Ralph Shore (died 1430/1), of Derby, was an English politician.

He was a member (MP) of the parliament of England for Derby in 1419, May 1421, December 1421 and 1423.
