= Peter la Chapman =

14th-century English politician

Peter la Chapman (fl. 1306) was an English politician.

He was a Member (MP) of the Parliament of England for Derby in 1306.

Parliament of England
Preceded by John de Chaddesdon; Gervase de Wileyne	Member of Parliament for Derby; 1306; With: Hugh Alibon	Succeeded by John Chaddesdon; Gervase de Wilney
