= Michael Thomas Bass =

English brewer and politician

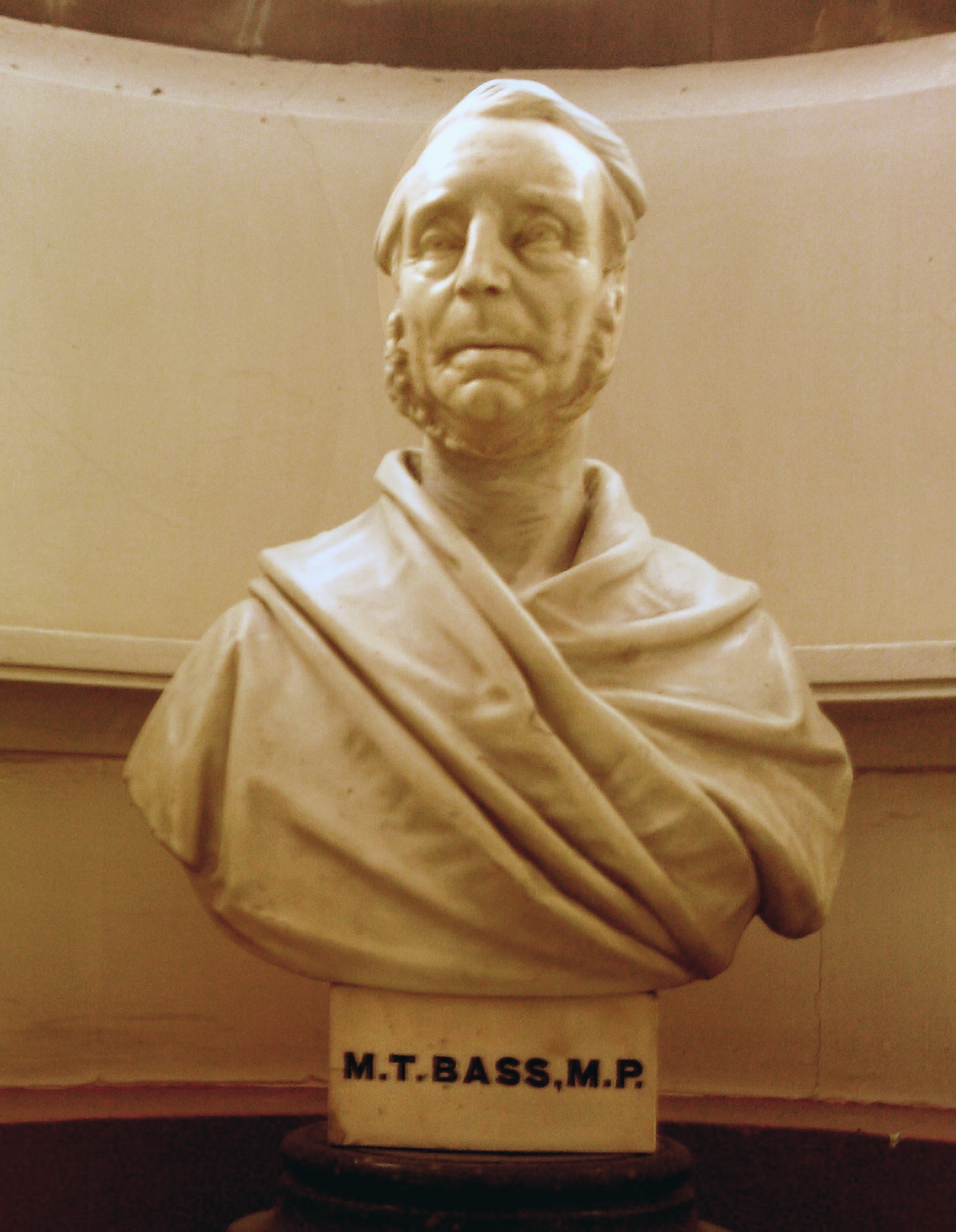
- Bass' bust in Derby Museum, which he funded.
- Born: 6 July 1799; Burton-on-Trent, Staffordshire, England
- Died: 29 April 1884 (aged 84)
- Occupation: Brewer
- Political party: Radical (1848-1859); Liberal (1859-1884)
- Spouse: Eliza Jane Arden
- Children: Michael Bass, 1st Baron Burton; Hamar Alfred Bass; Emily; Alice
- Parent(s): Michael Thomas Bass; Sarah Hoskins

Michael Thomas Bass, DL (6 July 1799 – 29 April 1884) was an English brewer and a Member of Parliament. Under his leadership, the Bass Brewery became the largest brewery in the world, and Bass the best known brand of beer in England. Bass represented Derby in the House of Commons between 1848 and 1883, first as a Radical, and then as a member of the Liberal Party upon its founding in 1859, where he was an effective advocate for the brewing industry. He was a generous benefactor both in Derby, and in Burton-on-Trent where his company was based.

== Early life and career ==
Bass was born at Burton-on-Trent in Staffordshire, the son of Michael Thomas Bass, who had expanded the brewery founded by his father William and made it a major exporter to Russia. Michael's mother, Sarah Hoskins, was the daughter of Abraham Hoskins, a prominent Burton lawyer.

Bass attended what was then known as The Grammar School in Burton and finished his schooling in Nottingham. At the age of 18, he joined the family business as an apprentice when business was not going well because the Napoleonic Wars had disrupted trade with Russia. However, the sales of India Pale Ale in India and Southeast Asia were taking off by the 1820s.

== Master brewer ==
A Bar at the Folies-Bergère (Un Bar aux Folies-Bergère), completed in 1882 by Édouard Manet. Several bottles of Bass beer and its distinctive triangular logo can be seen on the counter of this café concert in Paris

Bass took over control of the company in 1827 and continued the export focus on Asia. By 1832–33, the company was exporting 5,000 barrels of beer representing 40% of its output in that year.

The coming of the railway to Burton in 1839 helped the growth of the business by reducing transport costs. The company had four agents in the 1830s in London, Liverpool, Stoke-on-Trent and Birmingham. By the 1880s, this had grown to twenty-one in Britain and another in Paris. The export trade was supplied by the agencies in London and Liverpool.

Under Bass's leadership, company production and sales had grown enormously. Production of ale had grown to 340,000 barrels in 1860 and to almost a million barrels in the late 1870s. By 1881, the company had three breweries and 26 malthouses covering 145 acres (0.59 km^{2}) in Burton upon Trent. The company was Britain's biggest brewery and was one of its best known companies.

== Member of Parliament ==
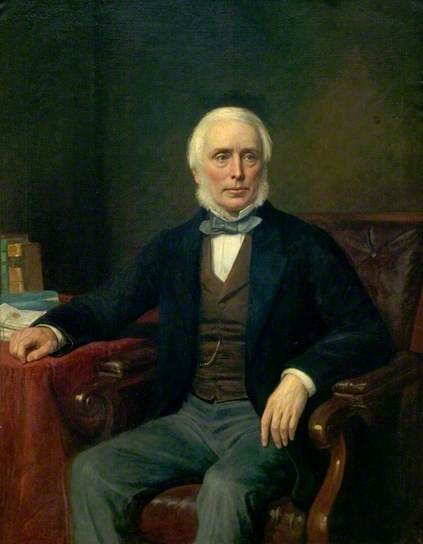
Michael Thomas Bass

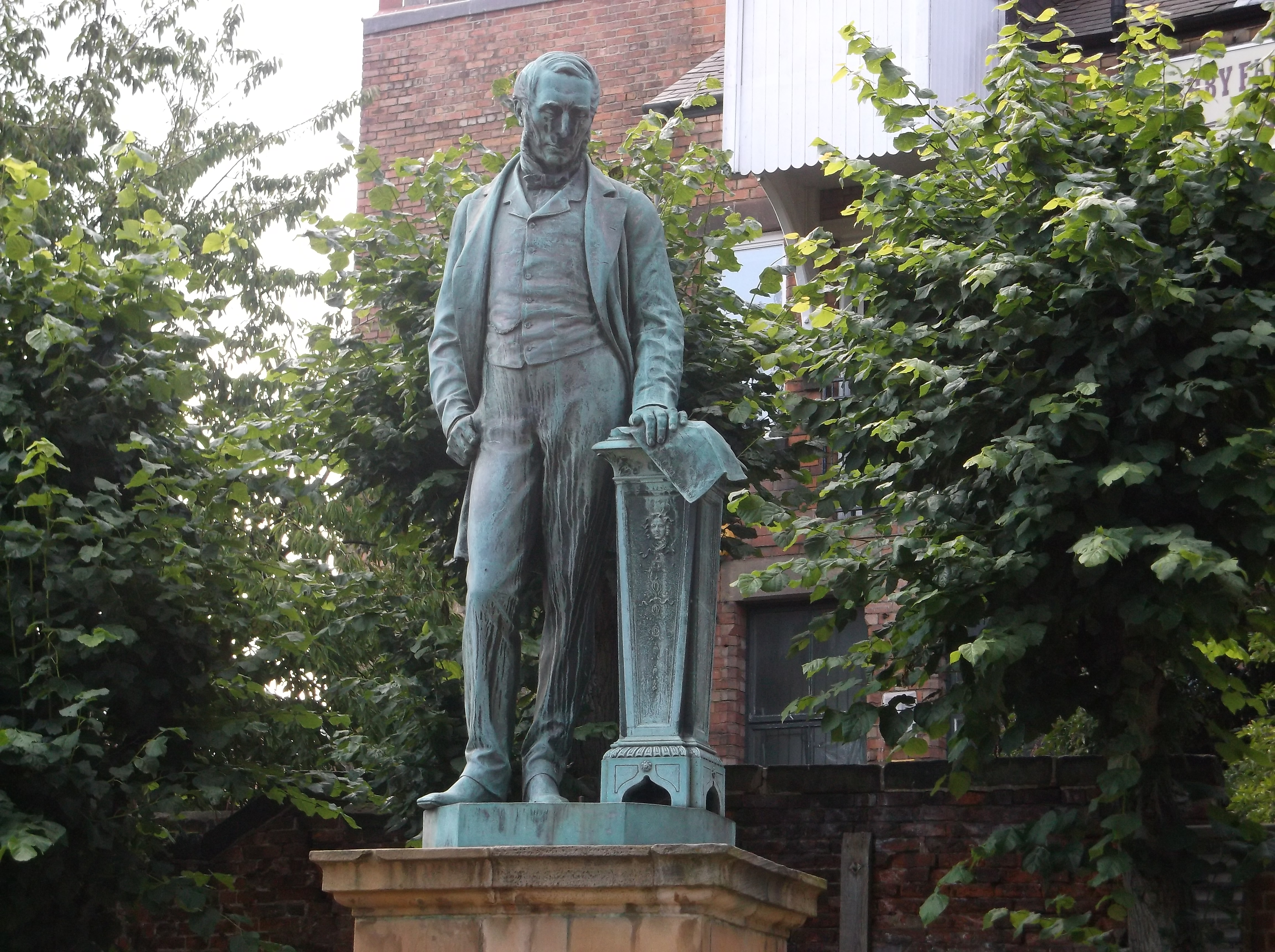
Statue to Michael Thomas Bass, Wardwick, Derby

Bass was first elected as the member for Derby in 1848 and served until 1883. His obituary in the Brewers Journal stated that he was known more "in the House of Commons for his regular attendance than for any feats of oratory." He focused on being a national advocate for the brewing industry against efforts by nonconformists within the Liberal Party to legislate against alcohol.

Bass was an orthodox Liberal supporting free trade, low taxes and improving living standards for the working class. He promoted legislation to abolish imprisonment for small debtors. His legislation against organ grinders on the grounds that they were street nuisances was less successful.

Bass was a philanthropist both in Burton and Derby. His obituarists claimed that his contributions totalled £80,000, and that he had given Derby a new library, museum, school of art, recreation ground, and swimming baths. He was instrumental in the creation of the Amalgamated Society of Railway Servants.

Bass represented Derby until the final years of his life. William Ewart Gladstone offered Bass a peerage, which he declined, preferring to stay in the House of Commons.

== Personal life ==
Bass married Eliza Jane Arden in 1835. They had two sons and two daughters. His elder son Michael Arthur took over the responsibility for running the company, represented Stafford in Parliament, and was elevated to the peerage in 1897 as Lord Burton. His other son Hamar Alfred also served as a member of Parliament (for Tamworth) but had gambling problems and was excluded from involvement in company affairs. One daughter, Emily, married Sir William Plowden, MP for Wolverhampton West, and the other, Alice, married Sir George Chetwode being the mother of Philip Lord Chetwode.

Parliament of the United Kingdom
Preceded by Hon. Frederick Leveson-Gower; Edward Strutt	Member of Parliament for Derby; 1848–1883; With: 7 others, in succession	Succeeded by Thomas Roe; Sir William Vernon Harcourt
Preceded by William Bulkeley Hughes	Oldest Member of Parliament? (not Father of the House); 1882–1883	Succeeded by James Patrick Mahon
