= Tomlins =

Tomlins may refer to:

- Sir Thomas Edlyne Tomlins (1762–1841), English legal writer
- Thomas Edlyne Tomlins (1804–1872), English legal writer, nephew of Sir Thomas
- Emily Tomlins, Australian actress, collaborator of Eryn Jean Norvill
- Keith Tomlins (born 1957), English cricketer
- Stan Tomlins (1923–2004), Australian rules footballer
- Richard Tomlins (politician) (1563–1650), MP for Ludlow
- Richard Tomlins (merchant) (?1564–1650), founder of the Readership in Anatomy at Oxford
- Richard Tomlins (judge), Baron of the Exchequer 1649–1660
