= Richard Tomlins =

Richard Tomlins may refer to:

- Richard Tomlins (politician) (1563–1650), Member of Parliament for Ludlow
- Richard Tomlins (merchant) (1564?–1650), founder of the Readership in Anatomy at Oxford
- Richard Tomlins (judge) (died after 1660), Baron of the Exchequer 1649–1660
