= Charles Compton (MP, died 1661) =

Sir Charles Compton (c. 1624 – November 1661) was a Northamptonshire landowner, a Cavalier in the First English Civil War, and briefly an MP for Northampton after the Restoration.

== Family ==
Compton was the second son of Spencer Compton, 2nd Earl of Northampton of Castle Ashby and his wife Mary. He was educated at Eton College and accomplished at music and mathematics. Compton's father and brothers James (3rd Earl), William, and Spencer were also Cavalier officers, while his brother Henry became bishop of London. According to David Lloyd, Charles and William were identical twins. Another source gives their birth years as 1623 and 1625, with Spencer and Francis both 1629. The seven younger children of the 2nd Earl shared £30,000 after his 1643 death, Charles buying land at Grendon with his portion. He was married twice; first to Mary, sister of Sir William Fermor, 1st Baronet of Easton Neston, Northamptonshire; and secondly (c. June 1661) to Felicia, daughter of Thomas Pigott of Chetwynd, Shropshire, widow of William Wilmer, who brought with her an estate at Sywell. Charles supported enclosure.

With Mary, Compton had three sons and two daughters. With Felicia, Compton had one daughter, born after his death. Felicia's son William with her first husband was father of MP William Wilmer (c. 1692–1744). Felicia later married, thirdly, MP John Beaumont.

Compton's children included:

- Mary (died 24 May 1733) who married in London (15 May 1676) James Lane, 2nd Viscount Lanesborough; they had no children
- Hatton Compton (died 12 January 1741), the eldest son, who was Lieutenant of the Tower of London from 1713 to 1741.
- Anne (buried 8 January 1730), second daughter, who married (by 1686, as his third wife) Sir Thomas Domvile, 1st Baronet

== Career ==
In the First English Civil War, Compton was lieutenant colonel in the regiment of his brother the 3rd Earl. Arthur Collins, citing Lloyd, wrote that Compton was "distinguished for sobriety, moderation, discipline, conduct, and activity in the field". The Mercurius Politicus described him as "acting like the Knight of the Burning Pestle in all the country between Oxford and Banbury". Among the engagements in which he fought were Hopton Heath, where his father was killed, Edgehill; and the siege of Banbury Castle. Lloyd credits Compton with the December 1643 ruse which captured Beeston Castle, although Edward Burghall credits Captain Thomas Sandford for this. Compton was made knight bachelor at Oxford on 12 December 1643 alongside his brothers William and Spencer. In January 1645 Charles and William led an assault to retake Compton Wynyates, the Earl's seat, from William Purefoy; they captured outbuildings but had to withdraw for lack of reinforcements. On 26 February 1645, near Daventry, they led 300 horse to victory over 400 Roundheads.

In the Second English Civil War and Interregnum Compton was suspected of royalist sympathy but paid £127 to the Committee for Compounding with Delinquents in 1648 and lived quietly. In 1659 he was involved in John Mordaunt, 1st Viscount Mordaunt's conspiracy for a royalist rising, and with Lord Bruce was blamed for by Mordaunt for its failure in the east and north.

After the Restoration, Compton received a commission in the Royal Horse Guards and became a justice of the peace and deputy lieutenant. He won a by-election in Northampton in November 1661 but before he could take his seat he died in a fall from his horse. In recognition of his royalism, his son Hatton was recommended to be a Knight of the Royal Oak.

== Likenesses ==
External image
- Engraved portrait of Sir Charles Compton From the original picture in the Collection of Marquis of Northampton.

There is a portrait of Compton in the dining room at Compton Wynyates, alongside those of his father and brothers. An engraving of this was included in Henry Drummond's 1846 Histories of noble British families and published separately by William Pickering. A miniature c. 1645–1650 by Samuel Cooper is in a private collection in Scotland. A portrait by Peter Lely at Ham House was formerly identified as Sir Charles Compton but is now identified as John Leslie, 1st Duke of Rothes. In the same room hangs Lely's portrait of Sir William Compton, whom David Lloyd says was Charles' identical twin, and of which there is a copy in the National Portrait Gallery, London.

== Styles ==
- to 12 December 1643: the Honourable Charles Compton
- from 12 December 1643: the Honourable Sir Charles Compton
