= Thomas Gell =

Colonel Thomas Gell MP, Esq.
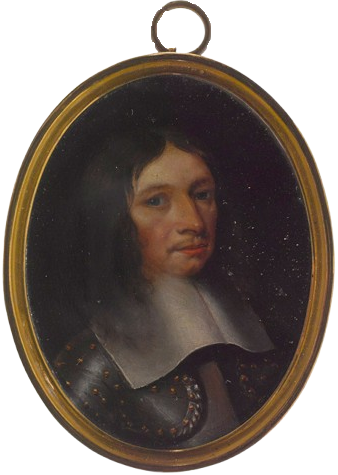
- A miniature portrait of Thomas Gell, MP, in oil on copper, English school, c. 1645
- Born: 1594; Hopton Hall, Hopton, Derbyshire
- Died: 1656 (aged 61–62)
- Title: MP for Derby
- Term: 1645-1648
- Political party: Parliamentarian

Thomas Gell (born 1594) was a Parliamentarian military leader and MP for Derby from 1645-1648, before being removed during Pride's Purge. He was the younger brother of Sir John Gell, 1st Baronet, and served as a colonel under his brother’s command in the Parliamentary Army during the First Civil War.

== Early life and career ==
As part of the Gell family, considered one of the richest in Derbyshire, Thomas was born in 1594 at Hopton Hall in Hopton, Derbyshire, to Thomas Gell (1532–1594) and Millicent Sacheverell (1571–1618), and was baptised at St Margaret's Church, Carsington on 20 Jan 1594/5.

His father died shortly before his birth, with his mother marrying John Curzon (1552–1632) of Kedleston Hall soon after, where Gell lived until 1614. In 1611, Gell was admitted to the Inner Temple and called to the bar 9 years later in 1620.

From 1632, he, along with his older brother Sir John Gell, 1st Baronet, was made Receiver and Supervisor for the Derbyshire and Staffordshire estates of the Duchy of Lancaster, a royal possession. This made Gell a revenue-raiser for the Crown in the years before the Civil War, including enforcing the highly controversial tax known as Ship Money.

The methods adopted by the Gell brothers included seizing property in lieu of unpaid Duchy rents or Ship money, causing widespread local resentment. One of such affected was Sir John Stanhope; and when he died in 1638, his wife Mary and cousin Philip Stanhope, 1st Earl of Chesterfield, took their case to the Privy Council. They lost, but the feud continued into the First English Civil War, in which Chesterfield consequently supported the Royalists.

== First English Civil War ==
The war in Derbyshire 1642 to 1646; key locations

See: First English Civil War

As a Presbyterian, the Gell family sided with the Parliamentarians, despite a failed attempt from Charles I to garner support. When the war began in August 1642, Gell was instructed to join his brother's regiment, having the task of securing Derbyshire for Parliament. This made the Gells the leading Parliamentarians in Derbyshire, with Oliver Cromwell staying at Hopton Hall several times during the war.

Gell spent the full Civil War as part of his older brother's command, eventually rising to the rank of Colonel by the War's end in 1645. The Gell brothers continued their reputation for brutality, especially from the parading of the Earl of Northampton's body through the streets of Derby after the Battle of Hopton Heath.

== Election as MP and subsequent exclusion ==
After the war's end in 1645, Gell replaced the Royalist William Allestry as MP for Derby and helped his brother obtain a grant of £1,200 from Parliament towards his arrears in October 1647.

The by-election for Gell was particularly contentious. Given the influence his brother already held over the military and civic life of Derbyshire and local resentment to the Gell family, his election was contested by Captain Robert Mellor, a candidate of the Freemen of Derby, a local burgesses' federation.

The Gells reportedly entered the Guildhall with armed soldiers, attempted to record voters’ names, and surrounded the building with guns to intimidate supporters of Mellor, especially contesting the use of 'postal votes' from absent soldiers and freemen being used. Additionally, Sir John Gell ordered Mellor to garrison Chatsworth the night before the election, in order to prevent his canvassing.

Two sets of election returns were sent to Parliament: one (unofficial, unsigned) declaring Thomas Gell elected, with another (official one, with seal) declaring Robert Mellor the winner. The Commons had to adjudicate which return was valid, with Gell, after prolonged dispute, declared the MP.

Gell served alongside Nathaniel Hallowes as an MP for Derby for 3 years until his exclusion during Pride's Purge, as the Gells had supported the moderate, anti-New Model Army faction.

== Later life ==
Later mentions of Thomas Gell include his successful petition in 1651 to spare his brother from treason charges after reported collusion with Royalist plots. Many of his records can today be found in the Derbyshire Record Office.

Gell died in 1656 at his family's ancestreal Hopton Hall in Hopton, and was buried on the 3rd April 1657 in nearby Wirksworth, Derbyshire.

== See also ==
- Commonwealth of England
- History of Derbyshire
- Hopton Hall

Parliament of England
Succeeded; William Allestry (1588–1655) (from Long Parliament, Allestry disabled to sit from 1643)	Member of Parliament for Derby; 1645-1648; With: Nathaniel Hallowes	Succeeded by Derby was unrepresented in the Barebones Parliament, Gervase Bennet in 1654
