= Thomas Byron =

English Royalist officer

Sir Thomas Byron
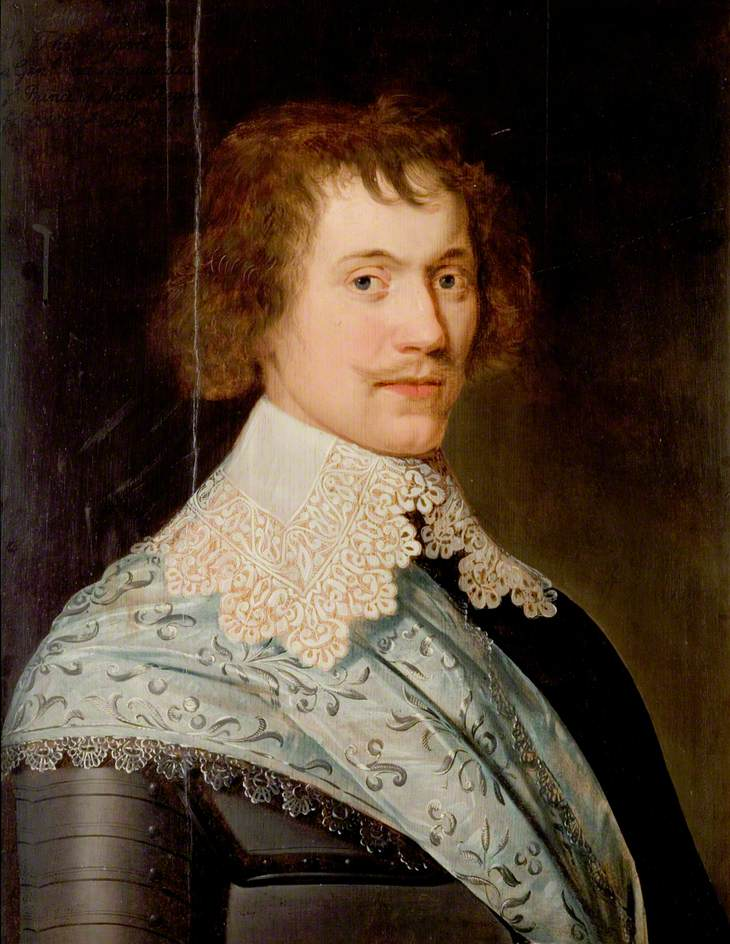
- 1631 portrait by Joachim Houckgeest
- Born: c. 1610; Colwick, Nottinghamshire, England
- Died: 5 February 1644 (aged 33–34); Oxford, England
- Military career
- Allegiance: Royalist Army
- Conflicts: Battle of Edgehill; Battle of Hopton Heath

Sir Thomas Byron (c. 1610 – 5 February 1644) was a Royalist officer during the First English Civil War. He had effective command of the Prince of Wales' cavalry regiment during the first year of the war, including at the Battle of Edgehill in late 1642. A few months later he led a charge during the Battle of Hopton Heath after the death of the Earl of Northampton, which helped the Royalists capture enemy artillery pieces. Byron was attacked by one of his own soldiers over a pay dispute in December 1643, and died from his wounds on 5 February 1644.

== Early life and family ==
Thomas Byron was born to Sir John Byron of Newstead Abbey, Nottinghamshire, and Anne Molyneux around 1610, the fifth of seven sons. The Byron family were influential land-owners in both Lancashire and Nottinghamshire, across which they owned thousands of acres of land. Byron's great-grandfather and grandfather both served as High Sheriff of Nottinghamshire, and his grandfather was also a Member of Parliament for the county in 1597. The family estate lessened during his grandfather's life, as he was forced to sell off parts of it to pay off his debts. Thomas married Katherine Braine, and had two children, Thomas and John, who both died in infancy. Katherine outlived Byron, and was buried at Westminster Abbey in 1676.

== English Civil War ==
On the outbreak of the First English Civil War in 1642, Byron and his brothers were "all passionately the King's", according to the writer Lucy Hutchinson, a family friend. All seven Byron brothers fought on the Royalist side; the eldest, Sir John Byron, was credited with raising the first Royalist cavalry regiment of the war, in which three of the younger brothers served as officers. Thomas Byron was appointed colonel of the Prince of Wales' cavalry regiment, and also commanded the Prince's troop, one of seven which made up the regiment. He was knighted by King Charles on 27 September, in Shrewsbury.

At the Battle of Edgehill in October 1642, where the regiment fought on the Royalist's right wing, Byron saved the life of one of his men, Richard Bulstrode, by shooting a Parliamentarian soldier who was attacking Bulstrode. In November, he was awarded a degree from Oxford University. In the same month, during the Royalist campaign in the Thames Valley, Byron and his older brother John occupied Fawley Court, the home of Bulstrode Whitelocke. The Royalist soldiers were ransacking the house, but Byron found Whitelocke's children hidden in the estate nearby, and protected them from harm, claiming that "it were a barbarous thing to hurt the pretty, innocent children". In the following January, the regiment was quartered in Oxfordshire, where they received a stipend of £252 per week.

By the following year, Edward Hyde, 1st Earl of Clarendon, described Byron as the de facto commander of the Prince of Wales' regiment, although the position was officially held by Henry Clifford, 5th Earl of Cumberland. Clarendon called Byron a "very valuable and experience officer". In March 1643, at the Battle of Hopton Heath, the Royalists' commanding officer, the Earl of Northampton, was killed leading a cavalry attack. Byron led a second charge which overran and captured the enemy artillery, while driving their cavalry from the battlefield. Byron himself was injured, taking a wound to his thigh. After recovering, Byron was given orders to provide support to Lord Hopton, who after his campaign in the south-west, was preparing to assault Surrey and Sussex. Byron and his regiment joined forces with Hopton in November 1643.

== Death ==
On 7 December 1643, Byron was attacked in Oxford as he left his lodgings by one of his own soldiers, Captain Hurst, over a pay dispute. The historian Peter Young speculates that Hopton may have been on leave, as the Prince of Wales' Regiment was still with Hopton. Hurst was executed the following week, while Byron died of the chest wound from the attack two months later, on 5 February 1644. He was buried four days later at Christ Church Cathedral, Oxford.

== Bibliography ==
- Barratt, John (2004). Cavalier Generals: King Charles I & His Commanders in the English Civil War, 1642–46. Barnsley: Pen & Sword Military. ISBN 978-1-84415-128-8.
- Brooks, Richard (2005). Cassell's Battlefields of Britain and Ireland. London: Weidenfeld & Nicolson. ISBN 0-304-36333-2.
- Manganiello, Stephen C. (2004). The Concise Encyclopedia of the Revolutions and Wars of England, Scotland, and Ireland, 1639–1660. Lanham, Maryland: The Scarecrow Press. ISBN 0-8108-5100-8.
- Yerby, George (2006) [2004]. "Byron, Sir Thomas". Oxford Dictionary of National Biography (online ed.). Oxford University Press. doi:10.1093/ref:odnb/4283. (Subscription, Wikipedia Library access or UK public library membership required.)
- Young, Peter (Autumn 1945). "The Prince of Wales's Regiment of Horse, 1642–46". Journal of the Society for Army Historical Research. 23 (95): 107–113. JSTOR 44221849.
- Young, Peter (1967). Edgehill 1642, The Campaign and the Battle. Kineton: The Roundwood Press. OCLC 905631257.
