= Hopton, Staffordshire =

Village in Staffordshire, England

Coordinates: 52.8329°N 2.08474°W

Hopton
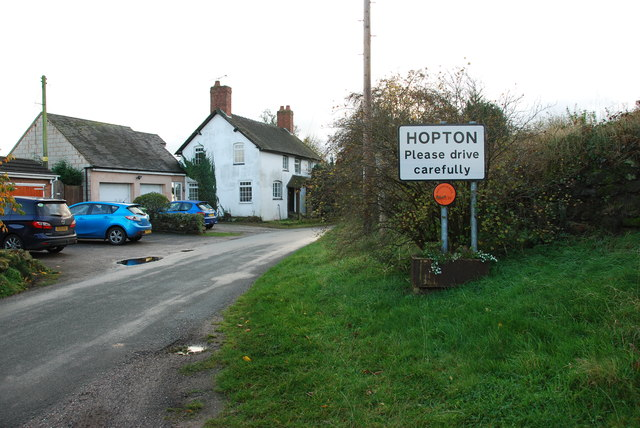
- Entering the Village of Hopton

- Location within Staffordshire
- Population: 1,615 (2011)
  - Density: 0.3
  - London: 145
- District: Stafford
- Shire county: Staffordshire
- Region: West Midlands
- Country: England
- Sovereign state: United Kingdom
- Post town: STAFFORD
- Postcode district: ST18
- Dialling code: 01785
- Police: Staffordshire
- Fire: Staffordshire
- Ambulance: West Midlands
- UK Parliament: Stone, Great Wyrley and Penkridge

Hopton is a village in the civil parish of Hopton and Coton. It is within the English county of Staffordshire.

== Location ==
The village is on the north eastern outskirts of the county town of Stafford and is just 3.2 miles (5.1 km) from the town centre. The village is 18.1 miles (29.1 km) south of Stoke on Trent. The nearest railway station is 3.3 miles (5.3 km) in Stafford. The village is situate a short distance east of the B 5066. The nearest main road are the A513 which passes the village 1.1 miles (1.8 km) to the west. Chaserider bus service 841 links the village to Uttoxeter and Stafford.

== Population ==
The 2011 census recorded a population for the parish of Hopton and Coton of 1.615 in 301 Households. The parish comes under the Stafford Non-Metropolitan District.

== Etymology ==
The genesis of the village name of Hopton is of Anglo Saxon origin and comes from the Old English word hop which means an enclosed area, which sometimes refers to remote places in marsh or moorland, or as in the case of Hopton, an enclosed valley. The second part of the name Hopton comes from tun, which in Old English has the meaning farmstead, so giving the village name the whole meaning of the farmstead in the enclosed valley.

== History ==
=== 1086 The Domesday Book ===
Hopton is listed in the Domesday Book of 1086. In the survey the village has the name Hotone in the Hundred of Pirehill. In the survey the settlement was described as of a medium size with 12 households. The assets of the village listed include 6 villager or villein, meadow of 4 acres, 2 furlongs by half furlong wide of woodland, 4 smallholders and 2 slaves. There was also 6 ploughlands (land for), 2 lord's plough teams, 3 and half men's plough teams. In 1066 the lord of the manor was held by the free man Alward. In 1086 the lord of the manor was held by Gilbert of Hopton from Robert of Stafford. The Tenant-in-chief in 1086 was Robert of Stafford. Taxation figures show the village had a Taxable value 2 geld units with a value to lord in 1086 of £2. The total tax assessment was valued at 2 geld unit.

=== Medieval Hopton ===
Reference is made in a document from 1587 which records annual rent that was due from the Chapel of Saint Peter. The chapel then belonged to Saint Mary's Collegiate Church in Stafford. The annual rent due was for the amount of 20 pennies for the building and its associated chapel yard. The long gone chapel was located just west of the village outskirts north of Hopton Lane in a field still known as Church Hill

=== 1643 Battle of Hopton Heath ===
grid reference SJ 957265
The Battle of Hopton Heath was a fought between Parliamentarian forces led by Sir John Gell of Hopton, Derbyshire and Sir William Brereton and a Royalist force under Spencer Compton, 2nd Earl of Northampton. It took place on Sunday the 19 March 1643. The events leading to this battle centered on the concerns of King Charles I over the royalist influence in Staffordshire. The King had ordered the Earl of Northampton to lead a force north from Banbury to secure the town of Stafford. Having secured Stafford, the Earl led his 1,200 troops, mostly cavalry, out to confront a Parliamentarian army of 1,500. The battle took place on Hopton Heath which at the time was a landscape of heathland with birch scrub but with enclosed grazing land around the present-day Heathyards. the battle began in the middle of the afternoon ending just before nightfall. Although the Earl of Northampton was killed in the battle, the Royalists had the better of the encounter and had captured eight Parliamentary guns and claimed victory. The Royalist claim of victory remained a matter of opinion due to the fact that the Parliamentarian Foot were still in position at nightfall when, as the Royalists themselves admitted, they drew back a little; or the fact that next morning the Royalists occupied the field after the Parliamentarians retreated in the night.
