= Hatton Compton =

English army officer

Hatton Compton (died 22 January [O.S. 12 January] 1741) was an English army officer who served as Lieutenant of the Tower of London from 1713 to 1741 and Lord Lieutenant of the Tower Hamlets from 1715 to 1717.

== Family and personal life ==
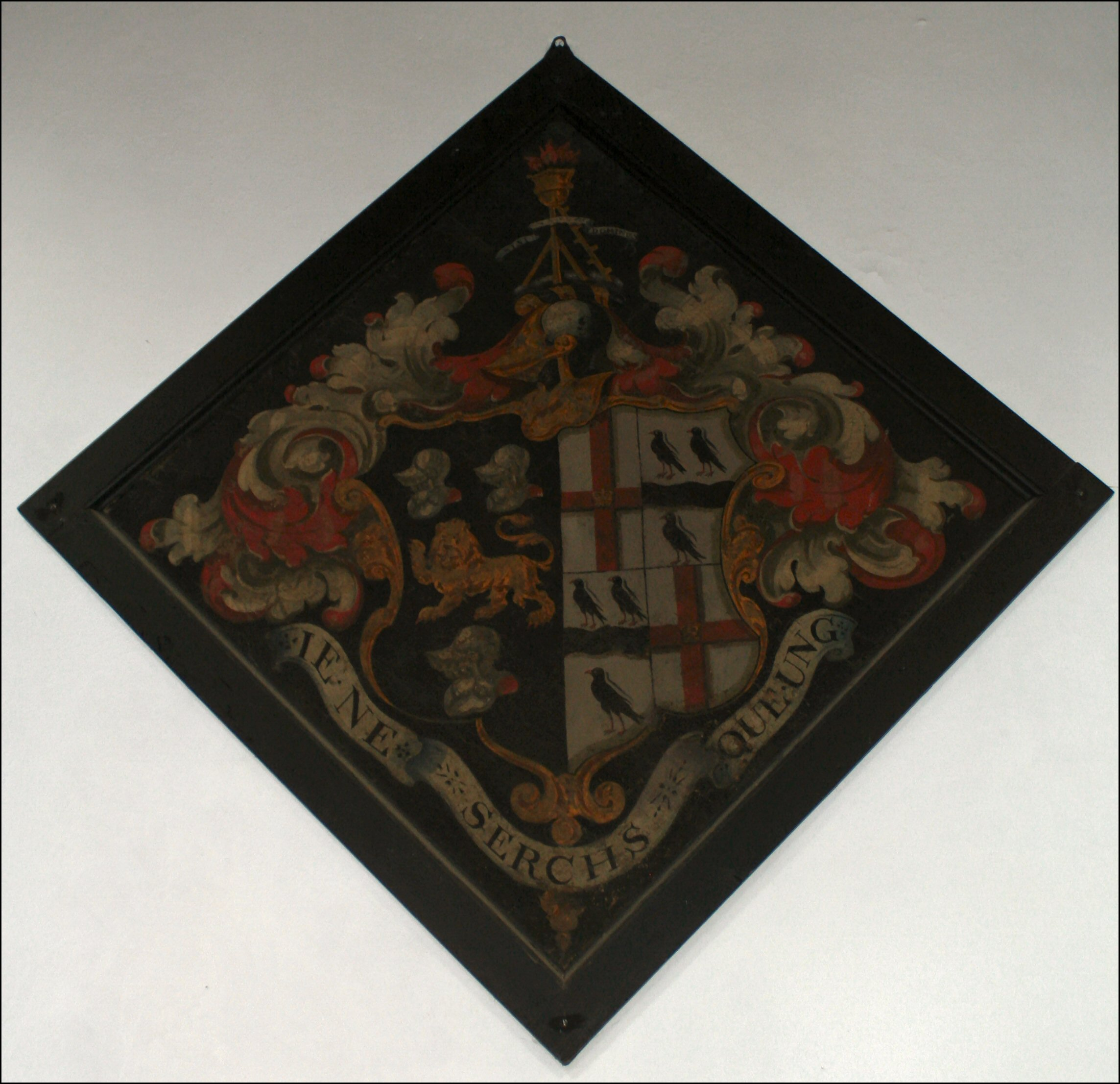
Hatton Compton's funerary hatchment in St Mary's Church, Grendon, with arms of Compton and Nicholas.

Hatton Compton was one of three sons and two daughters of Sir Charles Compton, of Grendon and Sywell in Northamptonshire, and his first wife, Mary, sister of Sir William Fermor, 1st Baronet of Easton Neston, also in Northamptonshire. Sources differ on Hatton's date of birth: Dalton says 1661, Edwards that he was the eldest son of a father who died in 1661; Adam Williamson that he was "in his ninetieth year" in 1741, giving a birth year of 1651–2; Arthur Collins that he died "aged upwards of 80"; an 1887 marriage licence index gives his age as 35 on 17 May 1698. Sir Charles Compton was the younger brother of the 3rd Earl of Northampton. Hatton Compton inherited Grendon Hall from his father and substantially extended it.

In honour of his late father's loyalty to Charles II during the Interregnum, Hatton Compton was recommended as Knight of the Royal Oak. On 18 January 1686 Compton and William Seymour were injured fighting a duel arranged after Seymour's great-uncle Henry had rejected a challenge from Compton's cousin the 4th Earl of Northampton, triggered by Henry's foiling of Northampton's wooing of his stepdaughter, the dowager Countess of Conway.

In 1698 Compton married his cousin Penelope Nicholas, daughter of MP Sir John Nicholas. At this time he settled the manor of Lavendon in Buckinghamshire, after the death of Henry Mordaunt, 2nd Earl of Peterborough, who had mortgaged the manor to Sir Charles Compton in 1653. Penelope and Hatton had three sons and a daughter:

- Charles (died 21 November 1761) a fellow of Gonville and Caius College, Cambridge and treasurer of the Society of Antiquaries of London from 1742. Adam Williamson said he shared his father's "miserable disposition",
- Edward (died 4 October 1769), cashier of the half-pay officers and later Deputy Paymaster of the Forces Abroad in Amsterdam during the War of the Austrian Succession; his son William (1733–1824) was chancellor of the Diocese of Ely
- James, married Frances Riggs of New York City in 1736; their daughter Penelope in 1778 married John Pennington, 1st Baron Muncaster
- Mary (born c. 1708), third wife (17 February 1748) of Thomas Gooch, bishop and Master of Gonville and Caius College

As executor of the will and testament of his uncle, bishop Henry Compton (died 1713), Hatton Compton consigned the Benedictional of St. Æthelwold to William Cavendish, 2nd Duke of Devonshire; of Henry's five advowsons in Colchester, Hatton gave three to Balliol College, Oxford, of which the bishop had been visitor, and sold two to his successor John Robinson. Compton lived in Soho; in Dean Street from 1713 until 1728, when he moved to a house in Great Marlborough Street given by Mary Dutton, widow of George FitzRoy, Duke of Northumberland. Adam Williamson, Compton's subordinate at the Tower of London from 1722, wrote after his death that "He had lived the last two years in a sort of Stupidity, and allwais in a Most close and avaritious Manner".

== Army service ==
Compton was a cornet in the Royal Horse Guards on 1 July 1685 in the troop of his uncle, Sir Francis Compton. During the Glorious Revolution, the cornet was an early supporter of the future king William III; about 7 November 1688, conspirators who met at his lodgings in St. Alban's Street, Westminster, included generals Percy Kirke, John Churchill and William Stewart, and bishops Henry Compton and William Sheridan. On 20 November Compton with some of his men (variously numbered as 14, "between 30 and 50", or "about 200") en route to Salisbury deserted James II for William at Honiton, even as his uncle and commander Sir Francis vacillated; his actions are mentioned in Francis Gwyn's diary. For this he was cursed in the Jacobite ballad "The Belgick Boar", but made a Groom of the Bedchamber by William from 6 July 1689 until the king's death in 1702.

Compton was made guidon and major of the 3rd Troop of Horse Guards in 1691 and promoted to lieutenant-colonel in 1692. In retreat after the 1693 Battle of Landen, Compton prevented the capture of king William, and he was breveted as colonel on 16 February 1694. He was promoted to brigadier on 7 March 1702, major general on 1 January 1704, and lieutenant general on 1 January 1707. He retired from the Guards in 1718.

== Tower service ==
In 1712 Compton's cousin, the 4th Earl of Northampton, was appointed as Constable of the Tower, the ceremonial governor of the Tower of London. That December, Northampton dismissed William Cadogan as Lieutenant of the Tower of London, the deputy office to the Constable. Within a month he appointed his cousin Hatton Compton as Cadogan's replacement. Northampton was Lord-Lieutenant of the Tower Hamlets, an office usually conferred on the Constable, but in August 1713, Compton disputed Northampton's authority to appoint William Nicholas as his agent for the muster of the Tower Hamlets militia to celebrate the Treaty of Portsmouth. In 1715 Northampton stood down as Constable and Lord-Lieutenant. On 29 July 1715, Hatton Compton was appointed Lord-Lieutenant but not Constable.

On 16 October 1715 Charles Howard, 3rd Earl of Carlisle, recently resigned as First Lord of the Treasury, was appointed Constable, but Compton remained as Lord Lieutenant to continue supervising the militia in the heightened security situation around the Jacobite rising. On 21 September 1715 Compton wrote to the Privy Council that "there is no Horse belonging to the Tower Hamlets, but two very strong Regiments of Foot; and [they] are ready to march when his Majesty pleases" and that he had ordered "the searching for, and seizing of Papists, Jacobites, and Non-Jurors". On 26 October he launched a loyalist defence association in the Tower Hamlets, which by November claimed over 3000 members.

Robert Harley, 1st Earl of Oxford was imprisoned by Compton, after his 1715 impeachment, in a part of the Tower occupied by the Royal Mint, causing Isaac Newton, then Master of the Mint, to complain at the encroachment. Edward Harley, the auditor of the imprests and brother of the earl, said of Compton "the Character of this man is so very mean that the best that can be said of him is, he is very fully qualified for a jailer". The House of Lords' command to deliver Jacobite lords Derwentwater and Kenmure to Westminster Hall for impeachment was addressed to Compton as "Lieutenant of the Tower" but it was his subordinate, Col. Robert d'Oyly, "Deputy-Governor of the Tower" who escorted the prisoners from the Tower on 9 February 1716. When the Earl of Nithsdale escaped from the Tower, Compton jailed his warders; when the Earl of Winton escaped, he blamed the warders' "wilfulness of carelessness" and said only the Constable had the authority to dismiss them.

Carlisle succeeded Compton as Lord-Lieutenant on 19 July 1717, after the Indemnity Act 1717 had freed most remaining Jacobite prisoners. Compton remained Lieutenant of the Tower until his death.

== Sources ==
- Dalton, Charles (December 1910). George the First's army 1714–1727. Vol. 1. London: Eyre and Spottiswoode.
- Royal Commission on Historical Manuscripts, ed. (1887). "Papers relating to the Tower of London 1712 to 1719". The Manuscripts of the Marquess Townshend. Reports. Vol. 11 Appendix Pt 4. HMSO. pp. 209–223. C-5060-III.
- Williamson, Adam; Fox, John Charles (1912). The official diary of Lieutenant-General Adam Williamson, deputy-lieutenant of the Tower of London, 1722–1747;. Vol. XXII, 3rd series. London: Camden Society.
- Wright, C. E. (1963). "The Benedictional of St. Ethelwold and Bishop Henry Compton". The British Museum Quarterly. 27 (1/2): 3–5. doi:10.2307/4422801. ISSN 0007-151X. JSTOR 4422801.

Honorary titles
| Preceded by William Cadogan | Lieutenant of the Tower of London; 1713–1741 | Succeeded by Lord Harry Powlett |
| Preceded by Earl of Northampton | Lord Lieutenant of the Tower Hamlets; 1715–1717 | Succeeded by Earl of Carlisle |
