= Eusebius Andrews (Royalist) =

Royalist conspirator executed in 1650

Colonel Eusebius Andrews
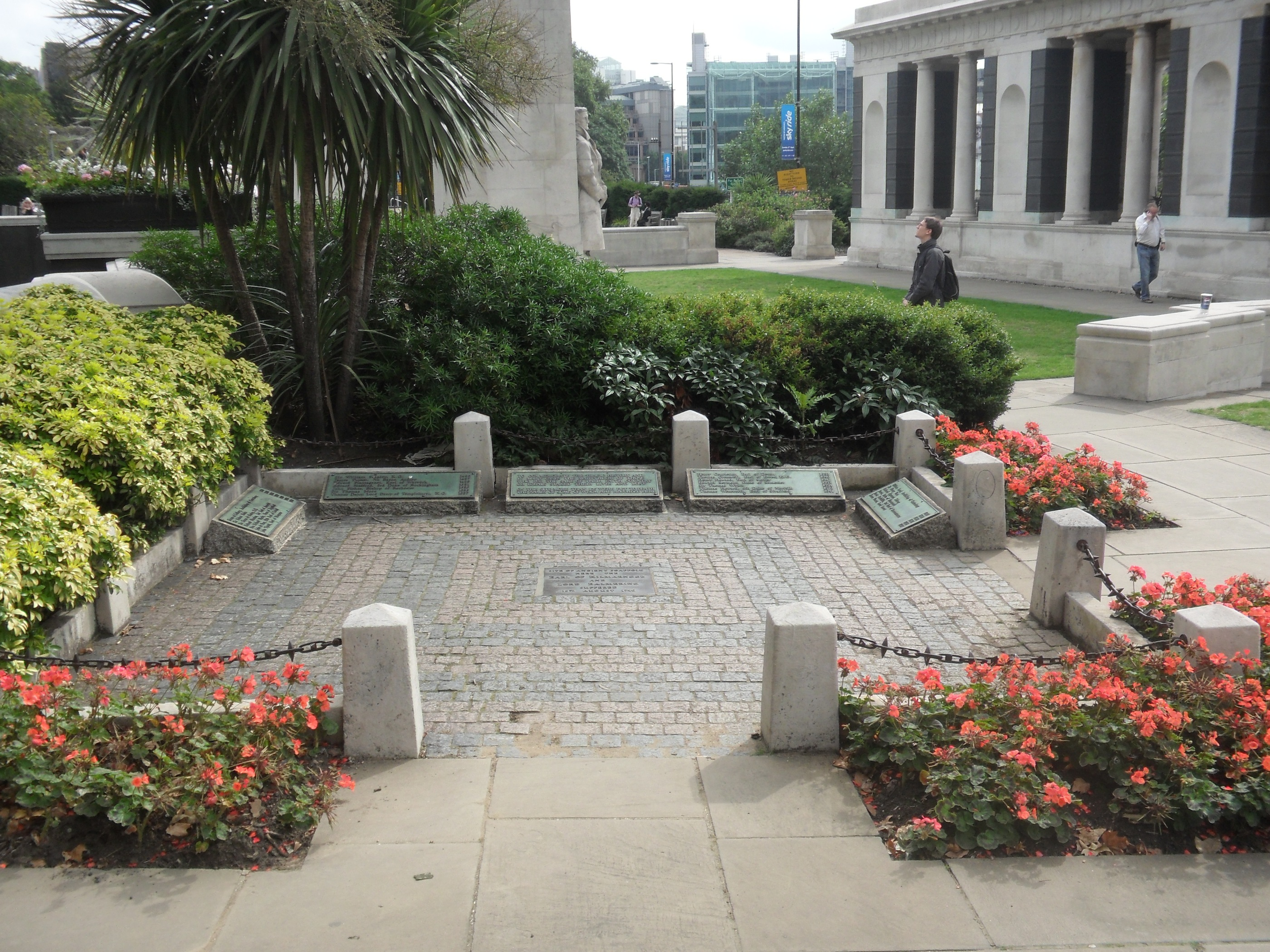
- Site of the scaffold at Tower Hill where Andrews was executed

Personal details
- Born: Baptised 20 December 1606 St Dunstan's, Stepney, England
- Died: 22 August 1650 (aged 43) Tower Hill
- Resting place: All Hallows-by-the-Tower
- Party: Royalist
- Spouse(s): Unknown, died before 1650
- Children: Katherine (1637); Matilda (1640-after 1685)
- Education: Christ's College, Cambridge
- Occupation: Royalist conspirator
- Profession: Lawyer

Military service
- Years of service: 1642 to 1646
- Rank: Colonel
- Battles/wars: Wars of the Three Kingdoms; Worcester

Eusebius Andrews, December 1606 to 22 August 1650, was a London lawyer and Royalist during the Wars of the Three Kingdoms, executed for his part in a 1650 plot to restore Charles II of England. A prominent supporter of the Crown since the early 1630s, he was a determined conspirator who organised a number of Royalist risings in Cambridgeshire between 1642 and 1650.

One of his co-conspirators in the 1650 plot was a government agent and Andrews was arrested as he tried to escape to the Dutch Republic in March. Other participants included Sir John Gell, sentenced to life imprisonment then released in 1653. Andrews was beheaded on Tower Hill on 22 August; after the 1660 Stuart Restoration, he was commemorated as a Royalist martyr.

== Personal details ==
Eusebius Andrews was born in Edmonton, London and baptised on 20 December 1606 at St Dunstan's, Stepney. The only surviving child of Eusebius Andrew (1577-1628), and his first wife Joan Dudley, he also had a half-sister Katherine (1619-1691) from his father's second marriage. She later became the third wife of John Lenthall (1625-1681), a senior civil servant under the Commonwealth, who apparently saw her connection to a Royalist martyr as a way to rehabilitate himself with the post-1660 regime.

Andrews himself married some time prior to 1637; the name of his wife is unknown, although she probably died before 1650 since she does not appear in his will. They had two daughters, Katherine (born and died 1637) and Matilda (c. 1640-after 1685).

== Career ==
Andrews graduated from Christ's College, Cambridge and followed his father into the legal profession, entering Lincoln's Inn in 1620 and qualifying as a barrister in 1627. A supporter of Charles I and Archbishop William Laud, in 1635 he helped prosecute Robert Mason, Recorder of London and an opponent of Personal Rule. This was a bold act since Mason was also part of the governance council for Lincoln's Inn. Andrews was removed for prosecuting a fellow member "contrary to the antiente custom of this house" and relocated to Cambridgeshire, near the Isle of Ely, where he continued to practice as a lawyer.

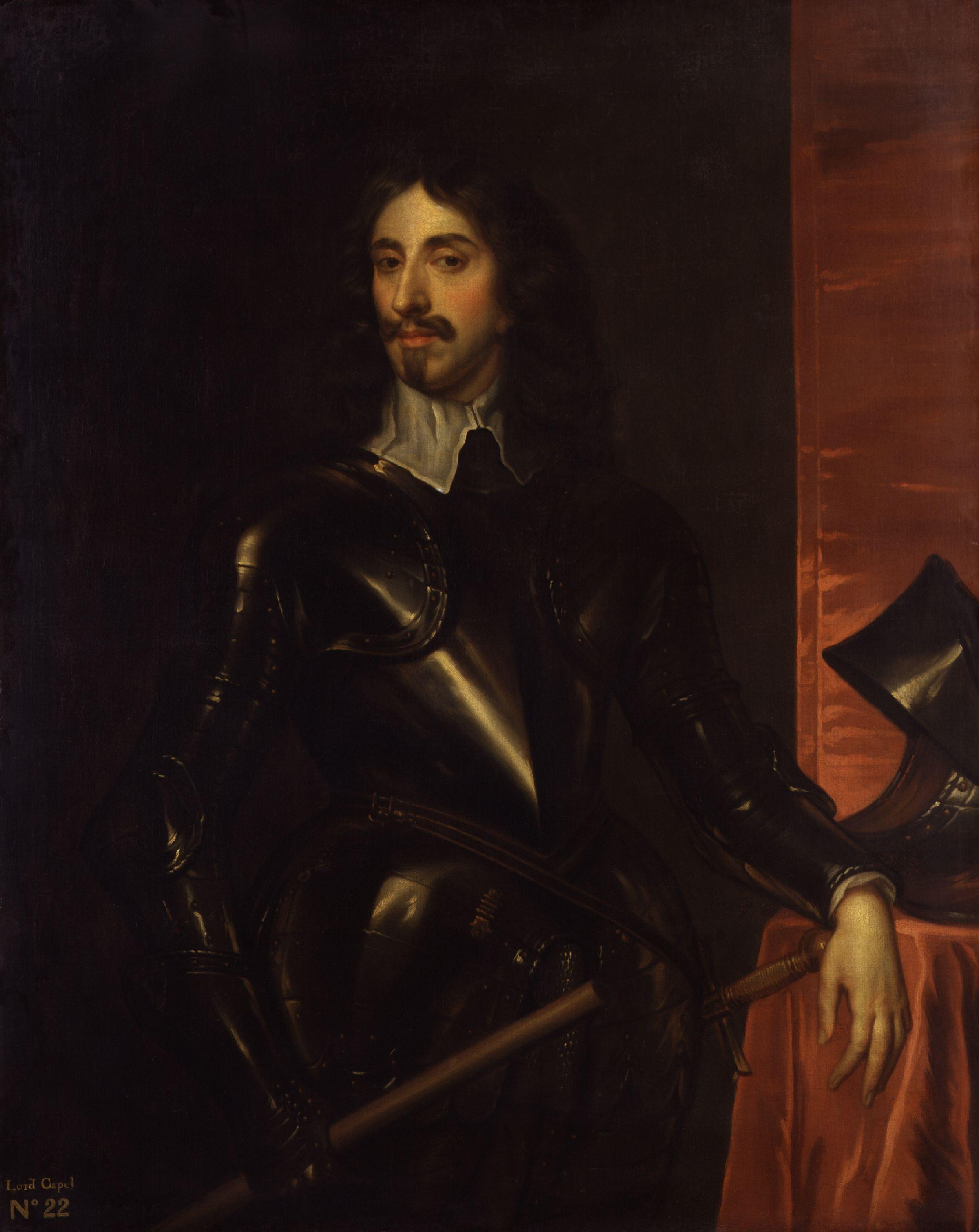
Royalist leader Lord Capel, executed in March 1649; Andrews acted as his secretary from 1643 to 1646

He was in London during the period of political upheaval initiated when the Long Parliament assembled in November 1640; in May 1641, he brought charges of "treasonous words" against John Lilburne, a Puritan radical. When the First English Civil War began in August 1642, Andrews had returned to Cambridgeshire, where he was active with the Bishop of Ely in issuing royal proclamations. The county as a whole was strongly Parliamentarian, and in 1643 he joined the Royalists in Oxford as did several of his relatives; another branch of the family were devout Calvinists who fought for Parliament. His rank of colonel was probably an honorary commission, since he does not appear in lists of regimental commanders; details of his activities are unclear, although he may have been involved in a plot to seize Ely in 1644.

In the "Narrative" prepared for the court in 1650, Andrews stated he was personal secretary to Lord Capel, who was related to his step-mother. He and Capel accompanied the Prince of Wales when he was appointed ruler of the West Country in January 1645, but did not accompany them into exile in March 1646. He was listed among the officers who surrendered in Worcester shortly before the war ended in July and returned to Ely. During the 1648 Second English Civil War, Andrews and Capel were involved in an unsuccessful attempt to seize Linton, Cambridgeshire; after its failure, Andrews escaped to The Hague but Capel was captured and later executed in March 1649.

Following the Execution of Charles I in January 1649, the Scots declared Charles II king and began negotiations to restore him to his English throne. Seeking alternatives, Charles also supported an alliance between Irish Protestant Royalists under James Butler, 1st Duke of Ormond and the Catholic Confederation. Now living in Suffolk, in September 1649 Andrews was approached by John Barnard, a "major formerly under his command" who urged him to back another rising in the Isle of Ely. Both Barnard and Pitt, also a witness against Andrews at his trial in 1650, appear in a 1644 list of Somerset Royalist gentry but had become government double agents.

By December 1649, the Irish Royalists were near defeat and in early 1650 Parliament ordered the arrest of those like Andrews who refused to swear allegiance to the Protectorate. Left with few options, he made arrangements to emigrate to North America before being persuaded to stay by Barnard, who apparently hoped to implicate more potential conspirators. One of these was Sir John Gell, former Parliamentarian commander in Derbyshire who had been stripped of all his offices in February 1649. Gell managed to avoid committing himself, although a former retainer named Benson was less careful; realising the conspiracy was going nowhere, Andrews prepared to leave for Holland but was arrested at Gravesend, Kent on 24 March 1650.

On 30 March, Andrews was committed to the Tower of London charged with treason; when questioned, he pointed out the role played by Bernard as an Agent provocateur or instigator of the plot. Although chief judge Bradshaw admitted this, he argued the "Narrative" supplied by Andrews confirmed his subversive intentions, regardless of Barnard's actions. His arrest coincided with news of Charles II arriving in Scotland and on the recommendation of Sir Henry Mildmay, his trial was delayed until 16 August in hopes he would provide information on other suspects.

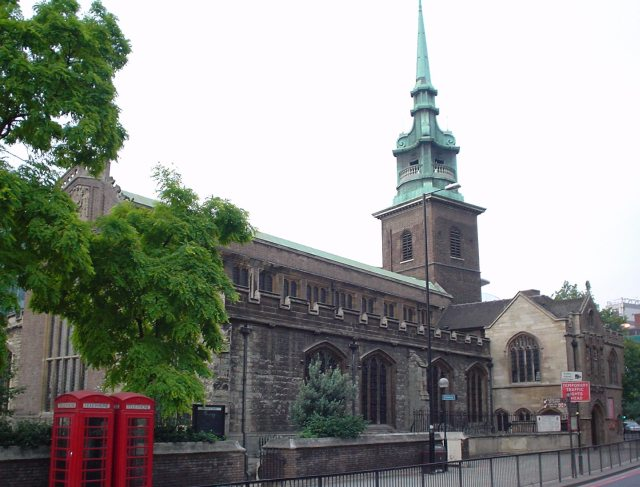
All Hallows-by-the-Tower, where Andrews was buried following his execution

At his trial, Andrews presented lengthy legal arguments objecting to the jurisdiction of the tribunal, which he claimed was in contravention of Magna Carta and the 1628 Petition of Right. Bradshaw had rejected the same arguments when used by Charles I at his trial and the verdict was never in doubt; Andrews was condemned to death on 19 August, although Parliament altered the usual penalty of hanged, drawn and quartered to beheading. Of the other conspirators, Benson was hanged in October, while Gell was found guilty of failing to communicate details of the plot; sentenced to life imprisonment, he was released on grounds of ill health in 1653.

Executed on 22 August, Andrews was buried in All Hallows-by-the-Tower, commonly used for those who died at Tower Hill, and asked that his body be placed near Archbishop Laud, executed in January 1645. Journalists of the period often recycled alleged speeches from the scaffold; the one attributed to Andrews was reproduced for James Stanley, 7th Earl of Derby, who was beheaded in October 1651. After the Stuart Restoration in 1660, Andrews appeared in various publications commemorating Royalist martyrs.

== Sources ==
- Anonymous (1737). England's Black Tribunal; or, the Royal martyr. Shewing, how they impeached the King of murder, treason, and other heinous crimes, etc. Verses. With woodcuts. Rivington.
- Braddick, Michael (2018). The Common Freedom of the People: John Lilburne and the English Revolution. OUP. ISBN 978-0198803232.
- Edwards, E.R (1983). ANDREW, Thomas (c.1645-1722), of Great Addington and Harleston, Northants in The History of Parliament: the House of Commons 1660-1690. Boydell & Brewer.
- Green, Mary Anne Everett, ed. (1876). Calendar of State Papers Domestic: Interregnum, 1650 Volume 9. HMSO.
- Helms, M.W; Jaggar, Geoffrey (1983). LENTHALL, John (c.1625-81), of Burford Priory, Oxon. and Besselsleigh, Berkshire in The History of Parliament: the House of Commons 1660-1690. Boydell & Brewer.
- House of Commons Journal Volume 6: 23 February 1649 (1802). Journal of the House of Commons: Volume 6, 1648-1651. HMSO.
- House of Commons Journal Volume 6: 20 August 1650 (1802). Journal of the House of Commons: Volume 6, 1648-1651. HMSO.
- House of Commons Journal Volume 7: 13 April 1652 (1802). Journal of the House of Commons: Volume 7, 1652-1654. HMSO.
- Jansson, Maija (2004). "Mason, Robert (1579-1635)". Oxford Dictionary of National Biography (online ed.). Oxford University Press. doi:10.1093/ref:odnb/18288. (Subscription, Wikipedia Library access or UK public library membership required.)
- Peacey, JT (2004). "Andrewes, Eusebius (1606-1650)". Oxford Dictionary of National Biography (online ed.). Oxford University Press. doi:10.1093/ref:odnb/521. (Subscription, Wikipedia Library access or UK public library membership required.)
- Scott, David (2003). Politics and War in the Three Stuart Kingdoms, 1637-49. Palgrave. ISBN 978-0333658741.
- Toynbee, Margaret (1962). The Andrew Family of Daventry in Northamptonshire Past and Present, Volume 15 (PDF). Northamptonshire Record Society.
- Toynbee, Margaret (1963). The Andrew Family of Daventry in Northamptonshire Past and Present, Volume 16 (PDF). Northamptonshire Record Society.
- Walker, Clement (1651). The humble Answer of Col. Euse∣bius Andrewes Esquier, to the Pro∣ceedings against him before the Honourable, The high Court of Justice 1650 in "The high court of justice. Or Cromwells new slaughter-house in England With the authoritie that constituted and ordained it, arraigned, convicted, and condemned; for usurpation, treason, tyrannie, theft, and murder.
- Winstanley, William (1665). The loyall martyrology. Thomas Mabb.
