= Nathaniel Hallowes =

English politician

Nathaniel Hallowes (1582–1661) of Dethick, Derbyshire was an English politician who sat in the House of Commons of England from 1640 to 1653 and again in 1659. He was an active Parliamentarian during the English Civil War.

== Biography ==
Hallowes was born at Derby, the son of Thomas Hallowes and his wife Kathryn. He purchased properties in Dethick, Thornsett and Mugginton in Derbyshire and Muston, Leicestershire. By 1640 he was an Alderman of Derby.

In April 1640, Hallowes was elected Member of Parliament for Derby for the Short Parliament. He was re-elected in November 1640 for the Long Parliament. By December 1642, he was showing his colours in the parliamentary cause when he was a signatory of a letter to the Speaker on 13 December explaining the Derby militia's unwillingness to spare some of the 700 men requested by Fairfax and others because they were needed to defend Derby from "malignants". The blame was put on Sir John Coke for his lack of support. In December 1647, when he was of Dethick Hall, he was granted a coat of arms. In 1648, he was one of the commissioners for militia in Derbyshire when he was described as mayor of Derby. He survived Pride's Purge and continued in parliament until the end of the Rump Parliament in 1653. In 1657, he was Mayor of Derby and in 1659 was in parliament again as part of the recalled Rump Parliament. He was again commissioner for the militia in 1659 to 1660.

Hallowes died at the age of 76.

Hallowes married Eleanor Sherwin at Derby on 22 December 1619 and had a son Samuel who was High Sheriff of Derbyshire in 1674.

Parliament of England
Vacant Parliament suspended since 1629	Member of Parliament for Derby; 1640–1653; With: William Allestry 1640–1643; Thomas Gell 1645–1648	Not represented in Barebones Parliament
