= Sir John Gell, 1st Baronet =

British landowner

Sir John Gell
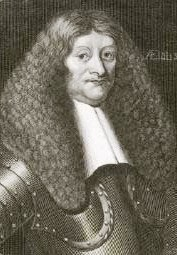
- Sir John Gell

Parliamentarian Commander Derbyshire, Staffordshire, and Warwickshire, Governor of Derby
- In office 1643–1646

Deputy Lieutenant of Derbyshire
- In office August 1642 – July 1646

High Sheriff of Derbyshire
- In office 1635–1636

Personal details
- Born: 22 June 1593 Hopton, Derbyshire, England
- Died: 26 October 1671 (aged 78) Westminster, London, England
- Resting place: St Mary's Church, Wirksworth
- Spouse(s): (1) Elizabeth Willoughby (1610–1644) (2) Mary Stanhope (1647–1648; dissolved)
- Children: (1) Mary and Elizabeth
- Education: Magdalen College, Oxford
- Occupation: Landowner, soldier and administrator

Military service
- Years of service: 1642 to 1648
- Rank: Colonel
- Battles/wars: First English Civil War; First Siege of Lichfield; Hopton Heath; Relief of Newark; Siege of Tutbury Castle; Siege of Belvoir Castle

Sir John Gell (22 June 1593 – 26 October 1671) was an English military officer who acted as local Parliamentarian commander for most of the First English Civil War from 1643 to his resignation in 1646. He was notorious for parading the body of his Royalist opponent through Derby after the Battle of Hopton Heath in March 1643.

A member of the landed gentry, Gell was from Hopton, Derbyshire. Reputedly the richest man in Derbyshire, he proved an effective and energetic general, but the plundering conducted by his often unpaid troops provoked numerous complaints to Parliament. According to Puritan diarist Lucy Hutchinson, he "had not understanding to judge the equity of the cause, nor piety, nor holiness", while his men were "the most licentious, ungovernable wretches that belonged to the Parliament".

Gell resigned his commission just before the First English Civil War ended in 1646, and his ambiguous stance during the Second English Civil War meant he was removed from all his positions in February 1649. Implicated in a Royalist plot in 1650, he was sentenced to life imprisonment but released due to ill health three years later. Pardoned after the Stuart Restoration in 1660, he died in London October 1671.

== Personal life ==
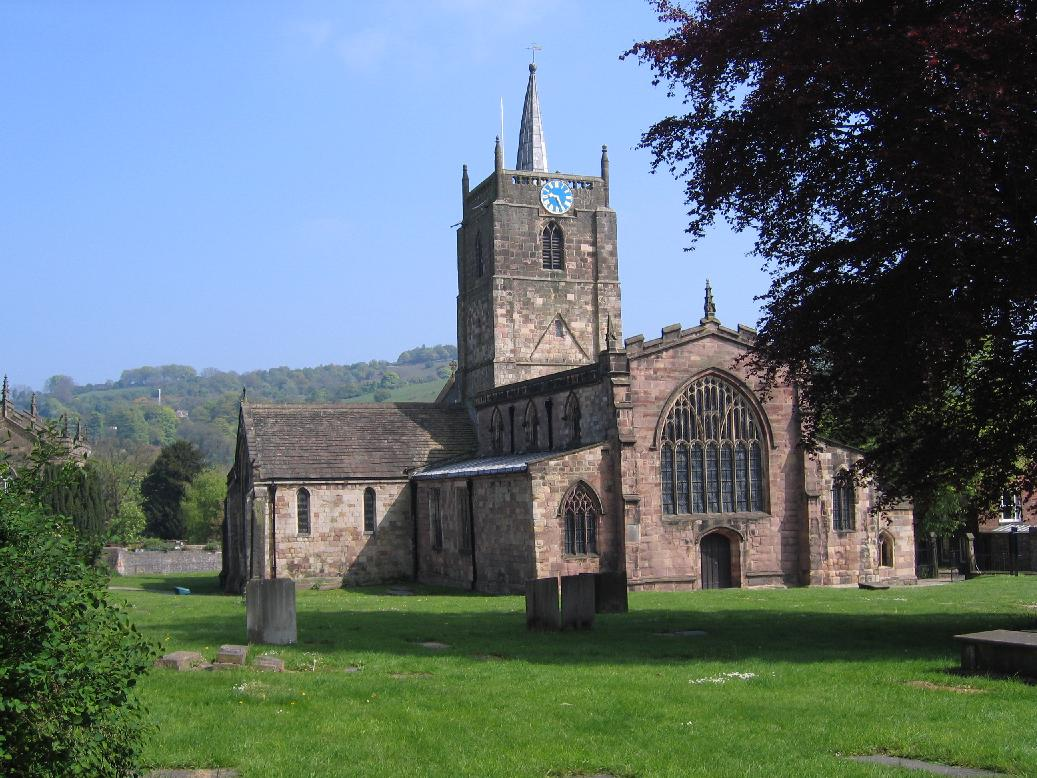
St Mary's Church, Wirksworth, where Gell was buried in 1671

John Gell was born 22 June 1593 in Hopton, Derbyshire, to Thomas Gell (1532–1594) and Millicent Sacheverell (1571–1618). His father died shortly before the birth of his younger brother Thomas (1594–1656), and his mother married John Curzon (1552–1632) of Kedleston Hall, where Gell lived until 1614. He formed a close relationship with his half-brother Sir John Curzon (1598–1686).

In January 1609, Gell married Elizabeth Willoughby (1600–1642), daughter of Sir Percival Willoughby of Wollaton Hall in Nottinghamshire. They had six children who reached adulthood; Millicent (1611–1652), Bridgett (1612–1680), John (1613–1689), William (1615–1642), Elizabeth (1617–1707) and Eleanor (1620–1713).

Gell served as a soldier in the Netherlands, c1610, where he “is said to have acquired his Puritan sympathies”.

In 1648, he married Mary Stanhope (died 1653), widow of Sir John Stanhope, an act that provoked much comment among his neighbours. She belonged to the leading Royalist family in Derbyshire while Gell had pursued a long running feud first with her husband, then with her brother-in-law after the former's death in 1638. The marriage lasted less than a year.

== Career before 1642 ==
Gell graduated from Magdalen College, Oxford, in 1610, then lived in Kedleston before taking up residence in Hopton around 1620. One of the wealthiest men in Derbyshire, his income derived chiefly from sheep and extensive interests in the lead industry. These included Royalty payments on lead mines near Bakewell, Hope and Tideswell; his combative nature led to lengthy legal disputes over the amounts due and made him unpopular locally.

Gell contributed only a nominal amount to the 1625 Forced Loan, and refused to fund the local Trained Band in 1630, marking him as an opponent of Charles I. During the period of Personal Rule from 1629 to 1640, Charles often put men like Gell in charge of collecting payments due to the Crown, thereby making them liable for the entire amount. In 1632, Gell and his brother Thomas were appointed joint Receivers of the Honour of Tutbury, the name given to the Derbyshire and Staffordshire estates of the Duchy of Lancaster, a royal possession. Gell was also made High Sheriff of Derbyshire in 1635, making him responsible for collecting the highly controversial tax known as Ship Money.

The methods adopted by the Gell brothers included seizing property in lieu of unpaid Duchy rents or Ship money, causing widespread local resentment. One of those affected was Sir John Stanhope; when he died in 1638, his wife Mary and cousin Philip Stanhope, 1st Earl of Chesterfield, took their case to the Privy Council. They lost, but the feud continued into the First English Civil War when Chesterfield supported the Royalists. With war approaching, Charles sought to raise money by selling honours and in January 1642 Gell purchased a baronetcy for £300.

== First English Civil War 1642–1646 ==
The war in Derbyshire 1642 to 1646; key locations

As a Presbyterian, Gell's sympathies generally lay with Parliament, but the importance of the Derbyshire lead mines for manufacturing ammunition meant Charles unsuccessfully tried to win his support. When the war began in August 1642, Gell was instructed to secure Derbyshire for Parliament and recruited a regiment with his brother Thomas as lieutenant colonel. The local Royalists were led by Chesterfield; when he ransacked Hopton Hall, Gell retaliated by sacking his residence at Bretby Hall. He followed up by plundering Elvaston Castle, former residence of Sir John Stanhope, allegedly defacing his tomb in the local church and digging up his flower beds.

In March 1643, Gell joined Lord Brooke in an attack on Lichfield Cathedral, which was occupied by a Royalist garrison under Chesterfield. After Brooke was killed by a sniper, Gell took command and captured the position along with Chesterfield, who was held in London until 1649. He then combined with Sir William Brereton in an attack on Stafford, which ended in the inconclusive Battle of Hopton Heath on 19 March. The Parliamentarian artillery was captured but the Royalist commander, the Earl of Northampton, was killed after refusing to surrender. Gell offered to hand over the body in return for his artillery; when this was refused, he had Northampton's embalmed corpse paraded through the streets of Derby before burial.

While Lichfield was soon retaken by the Royalists, Gell replaced Brooke as Parliamentarian commander in Staffordshire and Warwickshire and was appointed Governor of Derby in 1644. Although an energetic and capable soldier, his bullying of the Derbyshire county committee and the plundering for which his unpaid troops became notorious provoked numerous complaints to Parliament. The formation of the New Model Army in April 1645 reduced his influence while he resented Derbyshire being used as a base by its troops. He reportedly ignored orders from Sir Thomas Fairfax to bring his troops to Naseby in June, then was reprimanded for allowing 3,000 cavalry from the defeated Royalist army to escape him at Ashbourne.

As the war came to an end in April 1646, it was discovered that he was negotiating more favourable terms with the Royalist garrison of Tutbury Castle than those offered by his colleague Sir William Brereton. He resigned his commission and went to London seeking payment of expenses he claimed were owed him; as a precaution, he first signed over his estates to his son John, keeping an annuity of £1,100 for himself.

== After 1646 ==
In 1645, Thomas Gell replaced the Royalist William Allestry as MP for Derby and helped his brother obtain a grant of £1,200 from Parliament towards his arrears in October 1647. During the internal power struggle over the post-war political settlement that dominated 1647 and 1648, Gell sided with the Parliamentarian moderates against the New Model Army. Previously the only person in Derbyshire excluded by Charles from the general pardon offered to his opponents in 1643, Gell now to pay the king £900 in return for a pardon.

Hopes of regaining his influence ended with Royalist defeat in the Second English Civil War and the Execution of Charles I in January 1649. Thomas was one of the MPs excluded by Pride's Purge in December 1648, while Gell himself was stripped of all offices in February 1649. During the Interregnum in 1650, he was involved in a conspiracy to restore Charles II led by the Royalist lawyer Eusebius Andrews, who was acting on his behalf in his divorce proceedings with Mary Stanhope. Although Gell was careful not to commit himself, one of his retainers was subsequently executed, and he was found guilty of failing to communicate details of the plot. The transfer of his estates in 1646 thwarted attempts to confiscate them, although he was sentenced to life imprisonment in the Tower of London. In 1653, he was released on grounds of ill health and allowed to live in a private house in London.

Following the Stuart Restoration in May 1660, he was formally pardoned and given a minor position in the Royal Household. He lived in London where he died on 26 October 1671, and was buried in St Mary's Church, Wirksworth.

== Sources ==
- Brighton, Trevor (2004). "Gell, Sir John, first baronet". Oxford Dictionary of National Biography (online ed.). Oxford University Press. doi:10.1093/ref:odnb/10508. (Subscription, Wikipedia Library access or UK public library membership required.)
- Carlton, Charles (1992). Going to the wars; the experience of the British civil wars 1638 to 1651. Routledge. ISBN 0-415-03282-2.
- Hibbert, Christopher (1993). Cavaliers and Roundheads; the English at war 1642-1649 (1994 ed.). Harper Collins. ISBN 978-0586090084.
- House of Commons Journal Volume 5: 22 October 1647 (1802). Journal of the House of Commons: Volume 5, 1646-1648. HMSO.
- House of Commons Journal Volume 6: 23 February 1649 (1802). Journal of the House of Commons: Volume 6, 1648–1651. HMSO.
- House of Commons Journal Volume 7: 13 April 1652 (1802). Journal of the House of Commons: Volume 7, 1652–1654. HMSO.
- Lysons, Daniel; Lysons, Samuel (1817). Magna Britannia: Volume 5, Derbyshire. T Cadell.
- Orchard, Stephen (2009). Nonconformity in Derbyshire: A Study in Dissent, 1600–1800. Paternoster. ISBN 978-1842276204.
- Royle, Trevor (2004). Civil War: The Wars of the Three Kingdoms 1638–1660 (2006 ed.). Abacus. ISBN 978-0-349-11564-1.
- Seddon, P.R (2004). "Stanhope, Philip, first earl of Chesterfield". Oxford Dictionary of National Biography (online ed.). Oxford University Press. doi:10.1093/ref:odnb/26252. (Subscription, Wikipedia Library access or UK public library membership required.)
- Sir John Gell’s Regiment. "Sir John Gell's Regiment of Foot". BCW Project.

Baronetage of England
| New creation | Baronet (of Hopton); 1642–1671 | Succeeded by John Gell |
