= Ralph Goodwin =

English politician (??–c.1658)

Ralph Goodwin (died ca. 1658) was an English politician who sat in the House of Commons variously between 1624 and 1644. He supported the Royalist cause in the English Civil War.

== Biography ==
Goodwin matriculated at Trinity College, Cambridge in Spring 1608. In 1611 he was a scholar and was awarded BA in 1612 and MA in 1615. He was incorporated at Oxford University in 1615. He was described as a learned author and an excellent poet.

In 1624 Goodwin was elected Member of Parliament for Ludlow and was re-elected in 1625, 1626 and 1628. He sat until 1629 when King Charles decided to rule without parliament for eleven years.

In April 1640, Goodwin was re-elected MP for Ludlow in the Short Parliament and was re-elected for the Long Parliament in November 1640. He supported the King and was disabled from sitting in February 1644.

== Family ==
Goodwin married Dorothy Long, daughter of Sir Walter Long. In 1630 he settled his property at Cowarne on his wife Dorothy. In 1646 he married a second time to Elizabeth Brabazon, daughter of Wallop Brabazon.

Fourteen years after his death there was a dispute over his inheritance. In his will he left Cowarne to his brothers John and Thomas Smith. He also mentions his brother Sir Thurston Smith and the nephew of his tutor at Trinity Dr Samuel Heron. The allegation was made that he was illegitimate and that the estate at Cowarne defaulted to the crown. A marginal note states that he was legitimate and born at Ipswich.

Parliament of England
Preceded by Spencer Compton, Lord Compton; Richard Tomlins	Member of Parliament for Ludlow; 1624–1629; With: Richard Tomlins	Parliament suspended until 1640
Vacant Parliament suspended since 1629	Member of Parliament for Ludlow; 1640–1644; With: Charles Baldwin	Succeeded by Thomas Mackworth; Thomas Moor
