= William Allestry (1588–1655) =

English politician

William Allestry or Allestrie (1588 – 4 September 1655) was an English politician who sat in the House of Commons of England from 1640 to 1643. He supported the Royalist side in the English Civil War.

Allestry was the son of George Allestry of the Allestry family of Alvaston. He became the recorder of Derby.

In April 1640, Allestry was elected Member of Parliament for Derby for the Short Parliament. He was re-elected in November 1640 for the Long Parliament until he was disabled from sitting in October 1643.

Allestry died at the age of 67 and was buried in the church of All Saint's, Derby.

Allestry married firstly on 9 April 1629 Sarah Smith, daughter of Thomas Smith. She died in 1638. He married again to Mary Agard, daughter of William Agard. He had three sons and four daughters by each of his wives.

Parliament of England
| Parliament suspended since 1629 | Member of Parliament for Derby; 1640–1643; With: Nathaniel Hallowes | Succeeded by Nathaniel Hallowes; Thomas Gell |
