= Battle of Hopton Heath =

1643 First English Civil War battle

Coordinates: 52.835°N 2.067°W

- Part of the First English Civil War
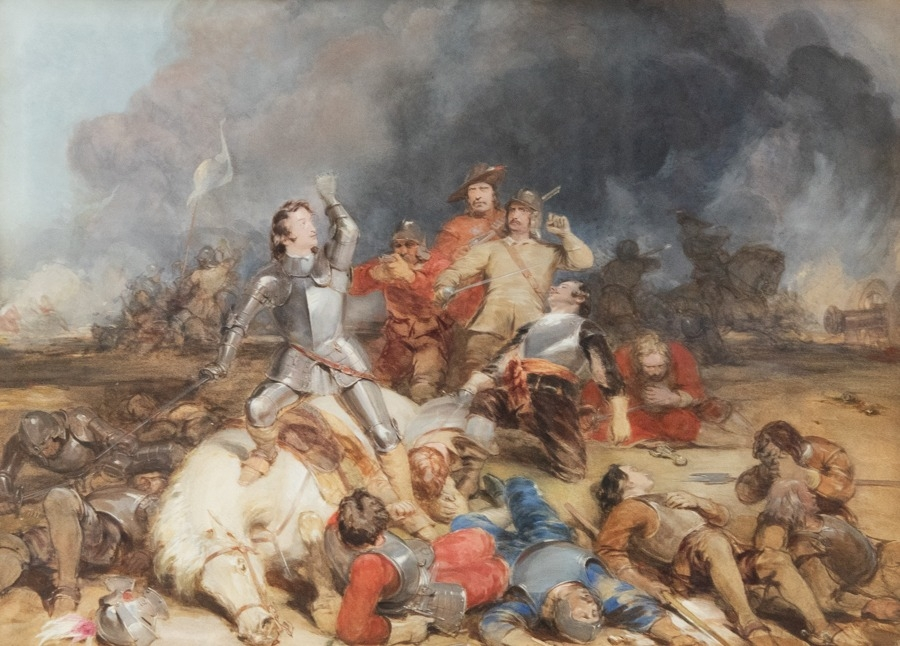
- The Battle of Hopton Heath; George Cattermole watercolour
Date	19 March 1643
Location	Hopton Heath, Staffordshire
Result	Inconclusive

Belligerents
Royalists	Parliamentarians

Commanders and leaders
Earl of Northampton †; Henry Hastings; Sir Thomas Byron	Sir John Gell; Sir Willam Brereton

Strength
1,200	1,400

Staffordshire and Hopton Heath

The Battle of Hopton Heath was a part of the First English Civil War, fought on Sunday 19 March 1643 between Parliamentarian forces led by Sir John Gell, 1st Baronet of Hopton and Sir William Brereton, 1st Baronet and the Royalist forces under Spencer Compton, 2nd Earl of Northampton.

== Background ==
On 6 March 1643, Sir John Gell successfully captured the town of Lichfield in Staffordshire. Gell then decided that he would attack the Royalist stronghold at Stafford which protected the Royalist's supply route between the ports of Yorkshire and their capital at Oxford.

To capture such a garrison, however, Gell would need reinforcements and therefore he arranged to meet and combine forces with the cavalry of Cheshire commander Sir William Brereton. The two Parliamentary leaders decided to meet at Hopton Heath on the 19th of the month.

Meanwhile King Charles had sent an expeditionary force under the command of the Earl of Northampton on a mission to take control of the West Midlands and Staffordshire. Northampton had joined forces with Royalist allies led by Henry Hastings at Tamworth and on 18 March they arrived at Stafford.

== Battle ==
On the morning of 19 March, Gell arrived at Hopton Heath. The Royalist forces became aware of the presence of the Parliamentarians mid-morning and shortly thereafter they began their preparations to advance to Hopton Heath. At 14:00 hours, Brereton arrived at the heath. The Parliamentarians took a position along a ridge on the northeast side of the field. In total, the Parliamentarian forces consisted of 1400 men including 700 infantry, 300 dragoons, and 400 cavalry.

At 15:00 hours, the Royalists arrived and deployed in battle formation to the south of the Parliamentarians. Their combined forces consisted of 1200 men including 300 dragoons and 800 cavalry. Hastings led the initial attack with his dragoons and was successful at pushing the Parliamentarians back at the edges. An exchange of artillery fire began with the Royalists doing the most harm with their large 29-pounder known as "Roaring Meg."

Northampton then led two cavalry charges aimed at the Parliamentarians' centre. Each time his attack was repulsed. On the second charge, Northampton was thrown from his horse into the Parliamentarian line where he was killed after refusing quarter. The Royalists regrouped and Sir Thomas Byron led a third charge against the Parliamentarians, but to no avail. Hastings tried to rally the Royalists for a fourth charge, but their energy was spent. At that time Brereton led a Parliamentarian infantry attack and pushed the Royalists back recapturing some of the field and artillery that had earlier been lost.

At dusk the fighting ended and the Parliamentarians left the field. The battle was over, not to be resumed. Brereton returned to his headquarters in Cheshire and Gell left for Derby abandoning the attempt to capture Stafford. Because of the nature of the cavalry charges against a Parliamentary force composed largely of infantry, the casualties were heavily one-sided; the Parliamentarians had 500 casualties as compared to 50 killed or wounded Royalists.

== Aftermath ==
After the battle, both sides claimed victory. The Parliamentarians believed they had won in that they held the field at the end of the day and had killed the Royalists' commander, the Earl of Northampton. The Royalists believed that they had won the battle in that they reoccupied the field the next morning and had captured eight artillery pieces, as well as inflicting many more casualties on the enemy than they suffered themselves.

With respect to the control of Staffordshire, Stafford was now free of Parliamentarian threat. Henry Hastings and the Royalists immediately tried to retake Lichfield and its strongly defended Close on 21 March, but failed. Two weeks later, Prince Rupert entered Lichfield and surrounded the Close. On 21 April Colonel Russell and the Parliamentarian garrison surrendered. Lichfield would then remain a Royalist stronghold for the duration of the Civil War.
