= Grendon, Northamptonshire =

Village in Northamptonshire, England

Coordinates: 52°14′4″N 0°42′52″W

Grendon
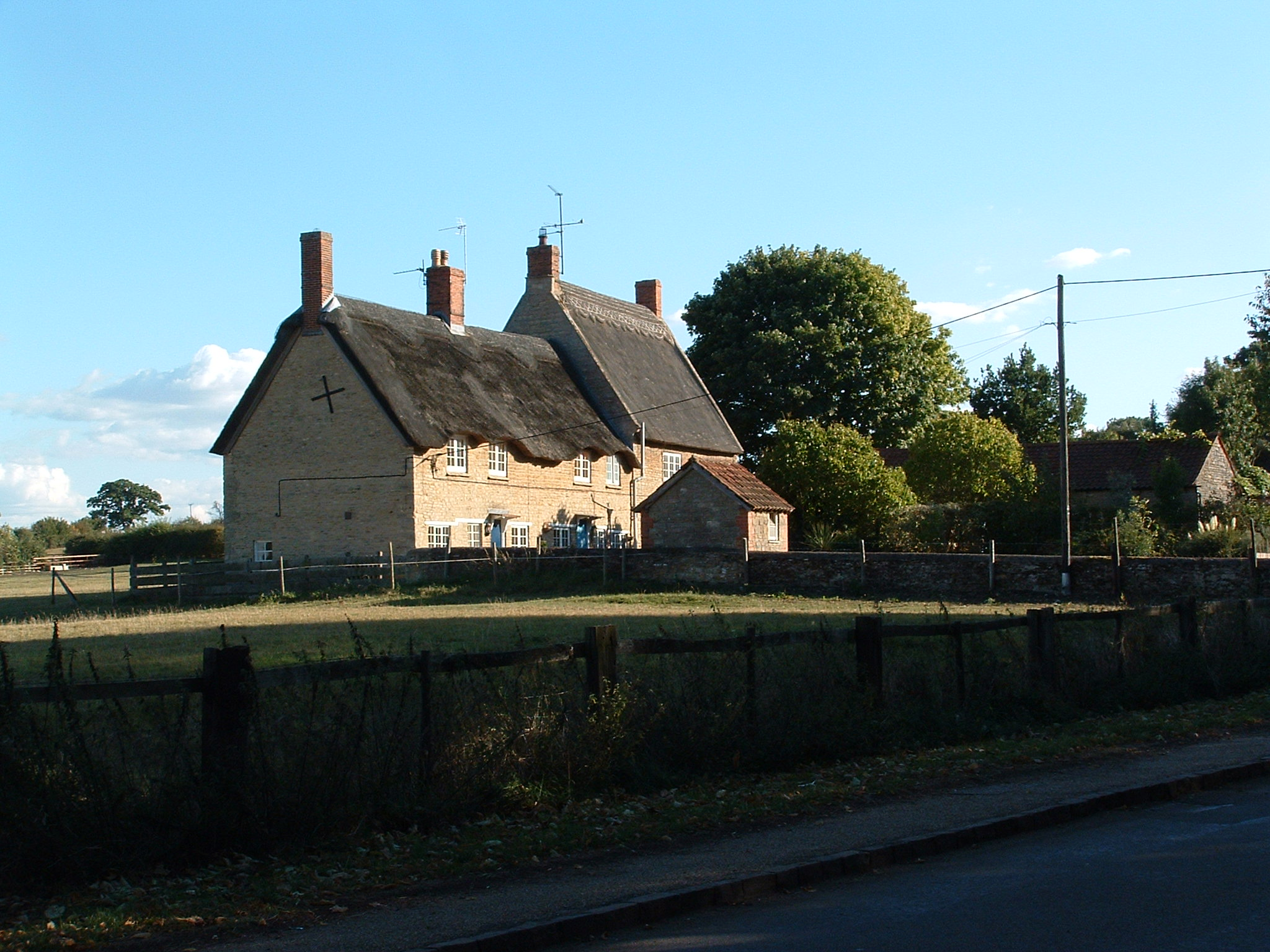
- Thatched cottages in Grendon

- Location within Northamptonshire
- Population: 544 (2011)
- OS grid reference: SP8760
- Unitary authority: North Northamptonshire
- Ceremonial county: Northamptonshire
- Region: East Midlands
- Country: England
- Sovereign state: United Kingdom
- Post town: Northampton
- Postcode district: NN7
- Dialling code: 01933
- Police: Northamptonshire
- Fire: Northamptonshire
- Ambulance: East Midlands
- UK Parliament: Wellingborough

Grendon or "Grenrian" as the locals call it, is a small village and civil parish in rural Northamptonshire, England, on the borders of Bedfordshire and Buckinghamshire. Many houses are made of the local limestone and various older thatched houses survive. The name of the village means "green hill" and today the village remains centred on the hill. As with Earls Barton, the village was owned by Judith of Lens, the niece of William the Conqueror.

At the time of the 2011 census, the parish population was 544; the village is a popular place to live with commuters to London or Milton Keynes. It is the site of the 19th-century local uprising called the 'Battle of Grendon'. The village is in two parts, separated by a brook. The smaller part of the village is often shown on maps as Lower End whilst the higher (southern) part of the village is at the top of the (steep) hill.

== History ==
The village is mentioned in the Domesday Book of 1086, when Grendon formed part of the hundred of Wymersley, which covered an area of 52 square miles (130 km^{2}). Here it is listed as having three hides and one virgate and land enough for nine ploughs, twelve sochmen, three mills rendering 3 shillings, along with 30 acres of meadow.

There is a village folklore about drunken revellers leaving the pub in olden days trying to fish the reflection of the moon from the brook; these characters became known as "Moonrakers". This story was reported by Thomas Sternberg in his 1851 book The Dialogue and Folk-lore of Northamptonshire, in which he reports that:

"...the men of Grendon go by the name moonrakers, in consequence, it is said, of a party of them having once seen the moon reflected in a pool and attempted to draw it out by means of rakes, under the impression it was a cheese!"

The village is twinned with Bois-Bernard in northern France.

=== Trinity College, Cambridge, and the advowson ===
The advowson of the church, including 12 acres (49,000 m^{2}) of glebe land – including their common rights and village tithes, was granted in 1342, to King's Hall, Cambridge by Edward III. When Trinity College, Cambridge was founded in 1546, the advowson was transferred to the Master and Fellows of the new Trinity College. In 1780, following an enclosure act, the tithes were all reduced to a cash payment. The control of the living was transferred in 1926 to the Bishop of Peterborough.

=== The lost village ===
In 1970, excavations produced evidence of an abandoned village or deserted medieval village, known as Coton (which means cottages) situated behind Grendon Hall.

=== The Battle of Grendon ===
On 29 August 1876, a battle took place between local farmers and their men over water rights. The scene was commemorated in a poem by a local poet.

== Governance ==
Grendon Parish Council is the first tier of local government.

== Geography ==
The village is surrounded by land owned by three great landowners:

- The Queen at Strixton,
- Trinity College, Cambridge, and
- The Castle Ashby Estate (Marquess of Northampton).

== Economy ==
Like many villages, Grendon has suffered from the loss of its local shop/post office after the owner sold the property on for development, following a series of raids. The property is now a private home. Grendon's second local pub, The Crown Inn, was also later sold on for development.

== Landmarks ==
The village has a parish church (St. Mary's) which dates in part back to Norman times, and a thatched pub, the Half Moon, run by the Charles Wells brewery.

=== St. Mary's Church ===
The church is built from limestone rubble with ironstone dressings. In the church are the remains, in the form of two rounded arches, of the original 12th-century building. The two eastern bays of the nave arcades and the chancel were rebuilt between 1368 and 1380, with the clerestory being added in the 15th century along with the four-storey tower; the tower contains a ring of five bells, dating from 1618. The church houses a wooden-framed clock which was made locally in 1690. The tower now uses a replacement made in 1970, but the original is still kept in the church as an exhibit and remains in working order.

Inside the church, on each side of the chancel there are medieval wooden corbel carvings of the grotesque faces of a nagging wife and her leering husband - they are thought to have been a local couple.

The gargoyles on the four corners of the tower represent the four evangelists:

- a bull for St. Luke and
- a lion for St. Mark
- a man's head for St. Matthew
- an eagle for St. John

The chancel was re-roofed c. 1848. There are three hatchments relating to the Compton family – one bearing ravens represents the arms of a former lord lieutenant of the Tower of London.

Of the church, Sir Nikolaus Pevsner says, "The first three bays on both sides are late Norman. Next in order of time the late 12th-century doorway with one order of shafts carrying simple moulded capitals and an arch with a thick roll moulding. Early 13th century the simple north doorway close to a pair of lancets. Money was left to the campanile in 1453."

Other features include:

- A book of commemoration for the eight parishioners killed in World War I and World War II.
- A medieval squint cut through the wall to give a view of the altar during services
- A memorial plaque to Thomas Willoughby of nether Grendon (Lower End)
- A three-seat sedilia set into the stone wall which was used by the priest, the deacon and sub-deacon
- A Victorian lead-lined font
- A wooden bier
- An oak pulpit dating from 1908
- Set into the floor, a 15th-century brass of an unknown and unnamed woman set between two husbands dressed in the armour of the type used at the Battle of Bosworth Field
- Set into the south wall is a 13th-century piscina used by priests to rinse their hands during mass.
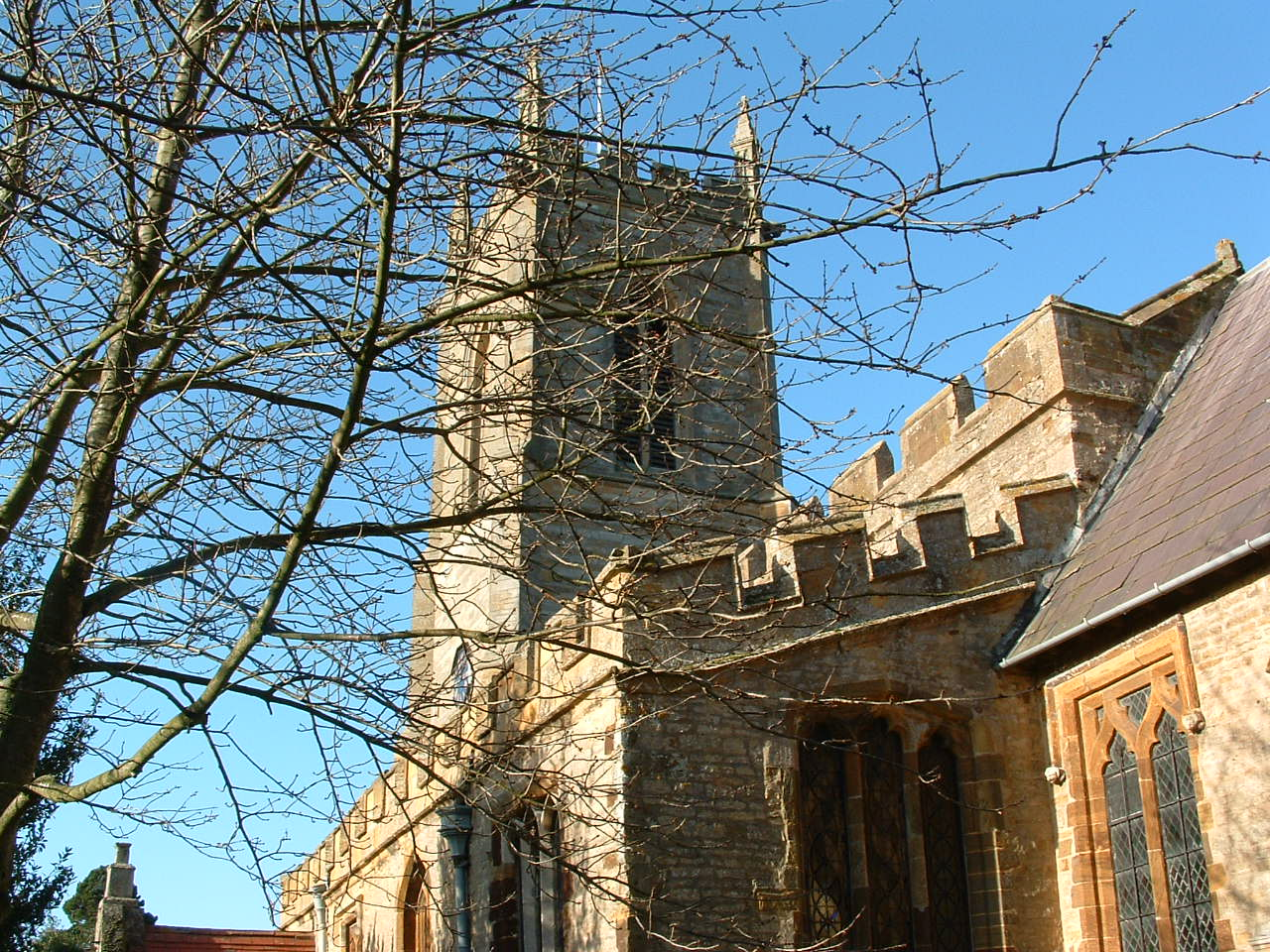
The outside of the church in winter

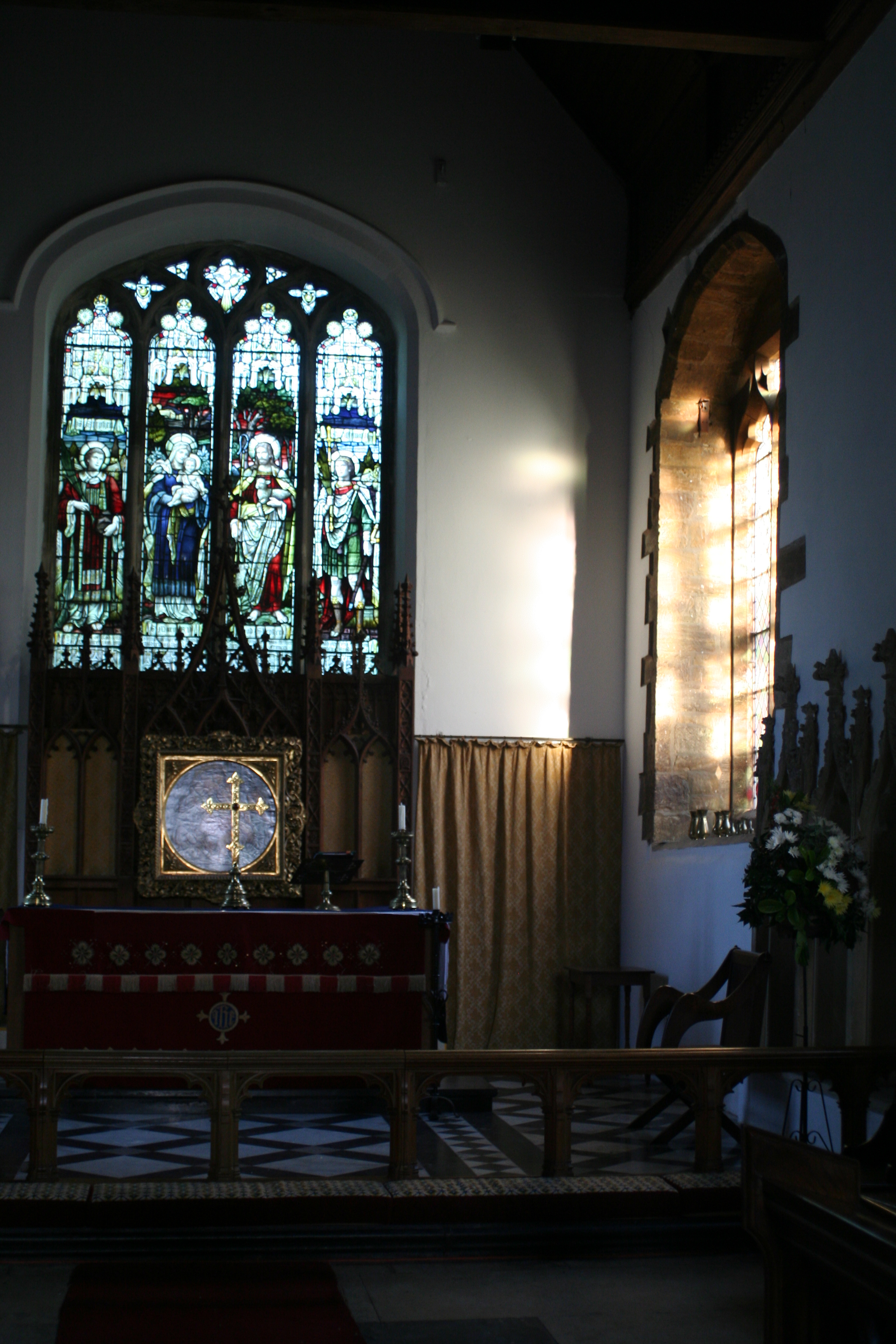
Inside the Church

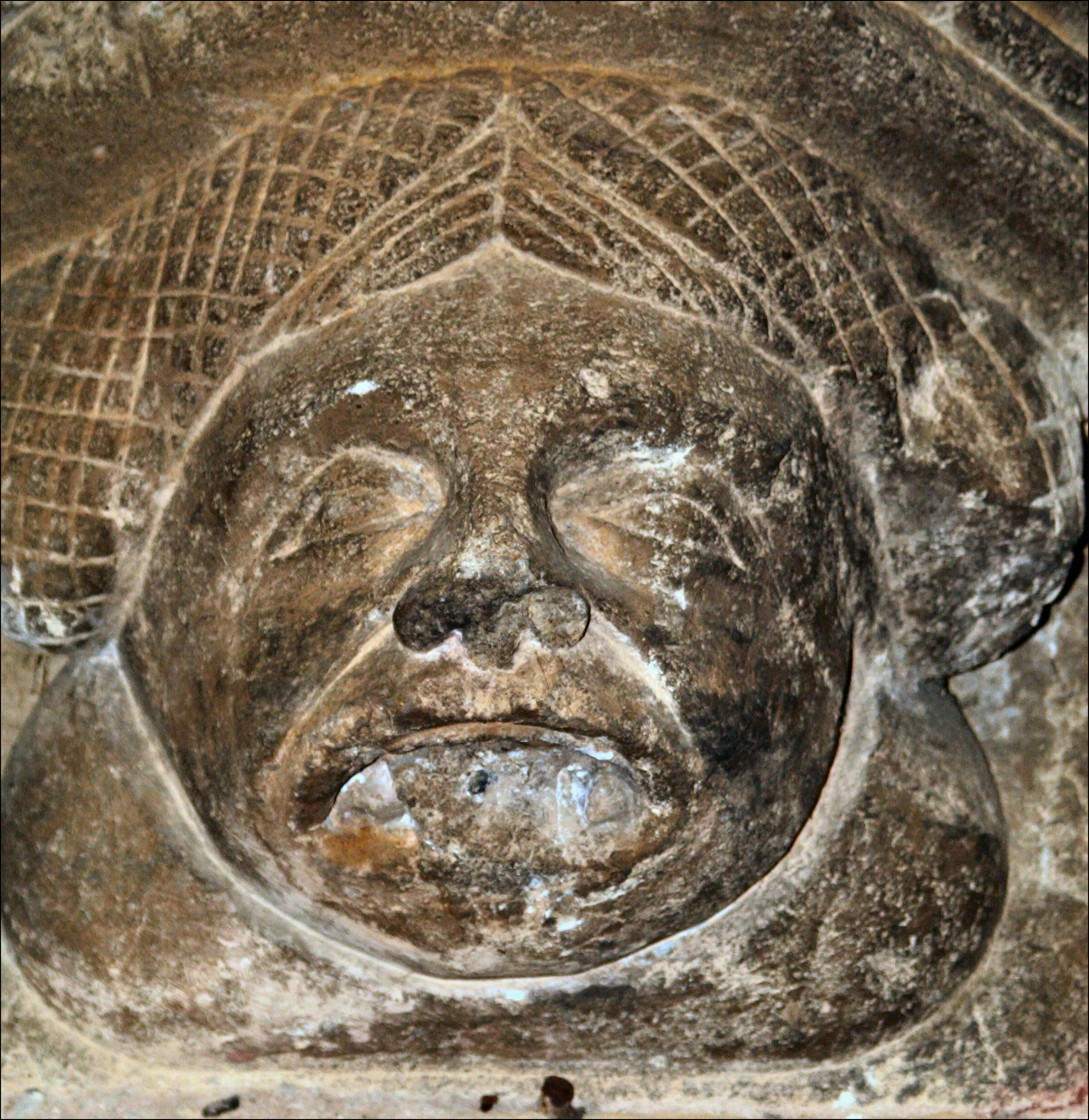
The grotesque nagging wife

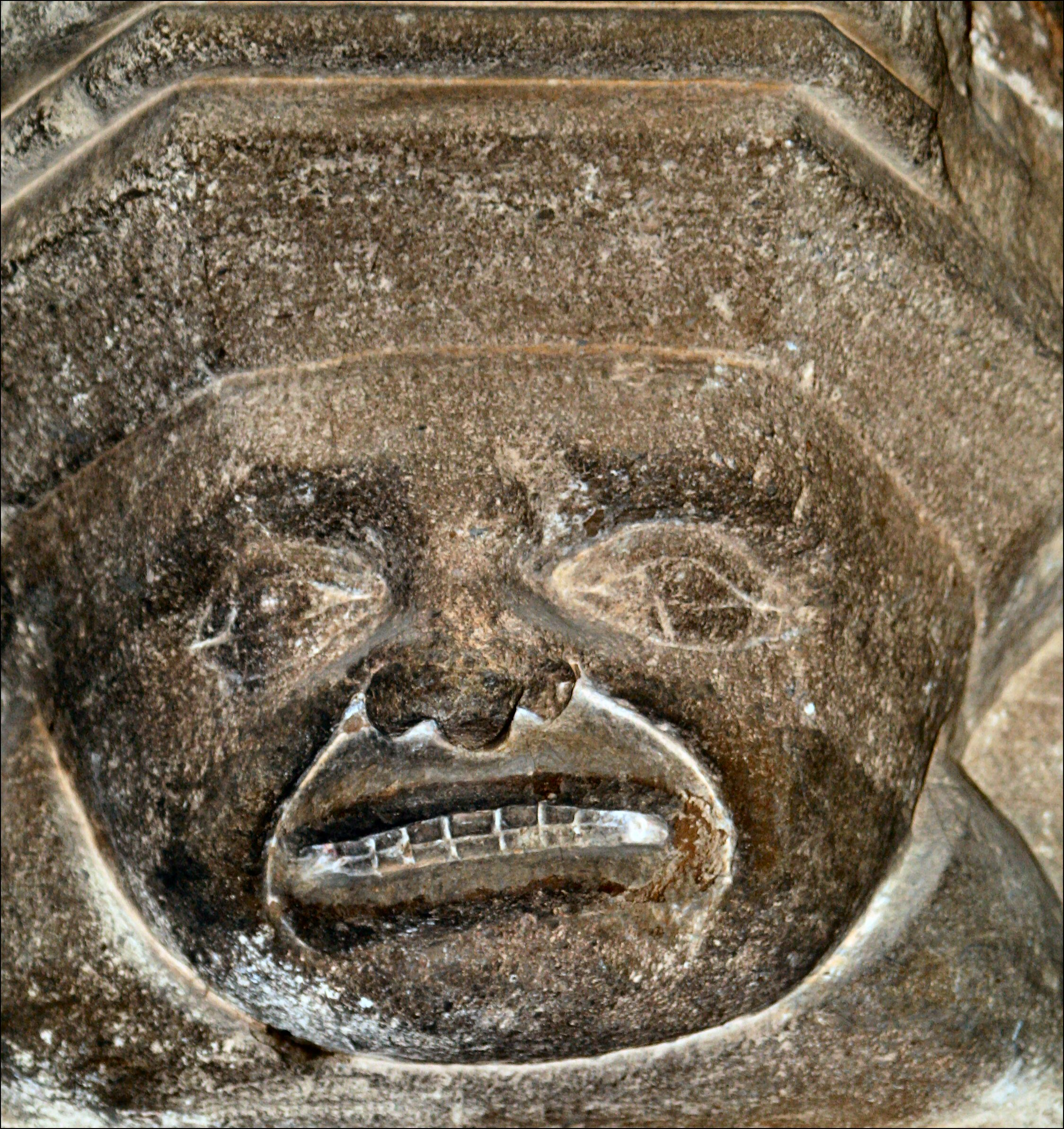
The nagging wife's husband

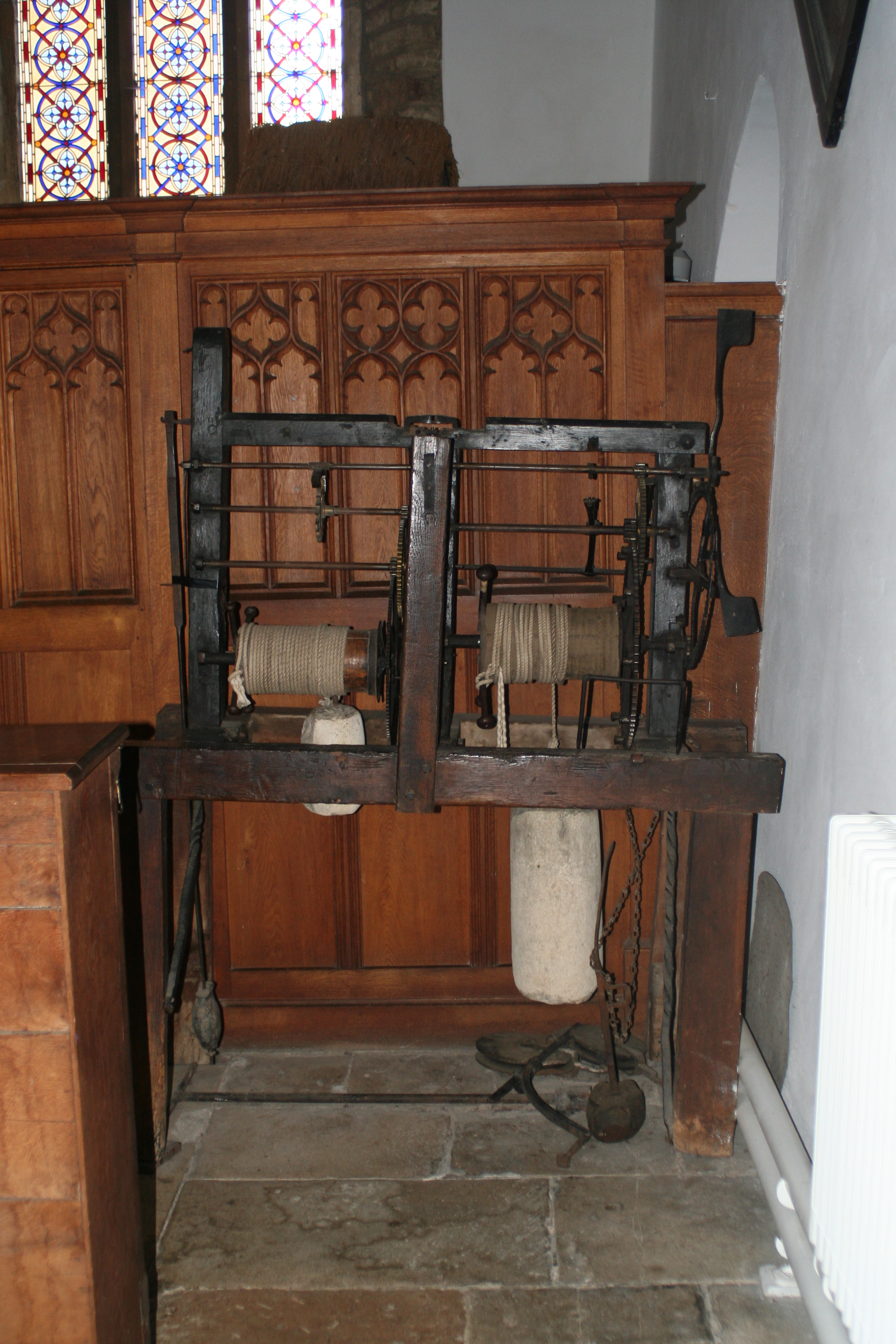
The workings of the old clock

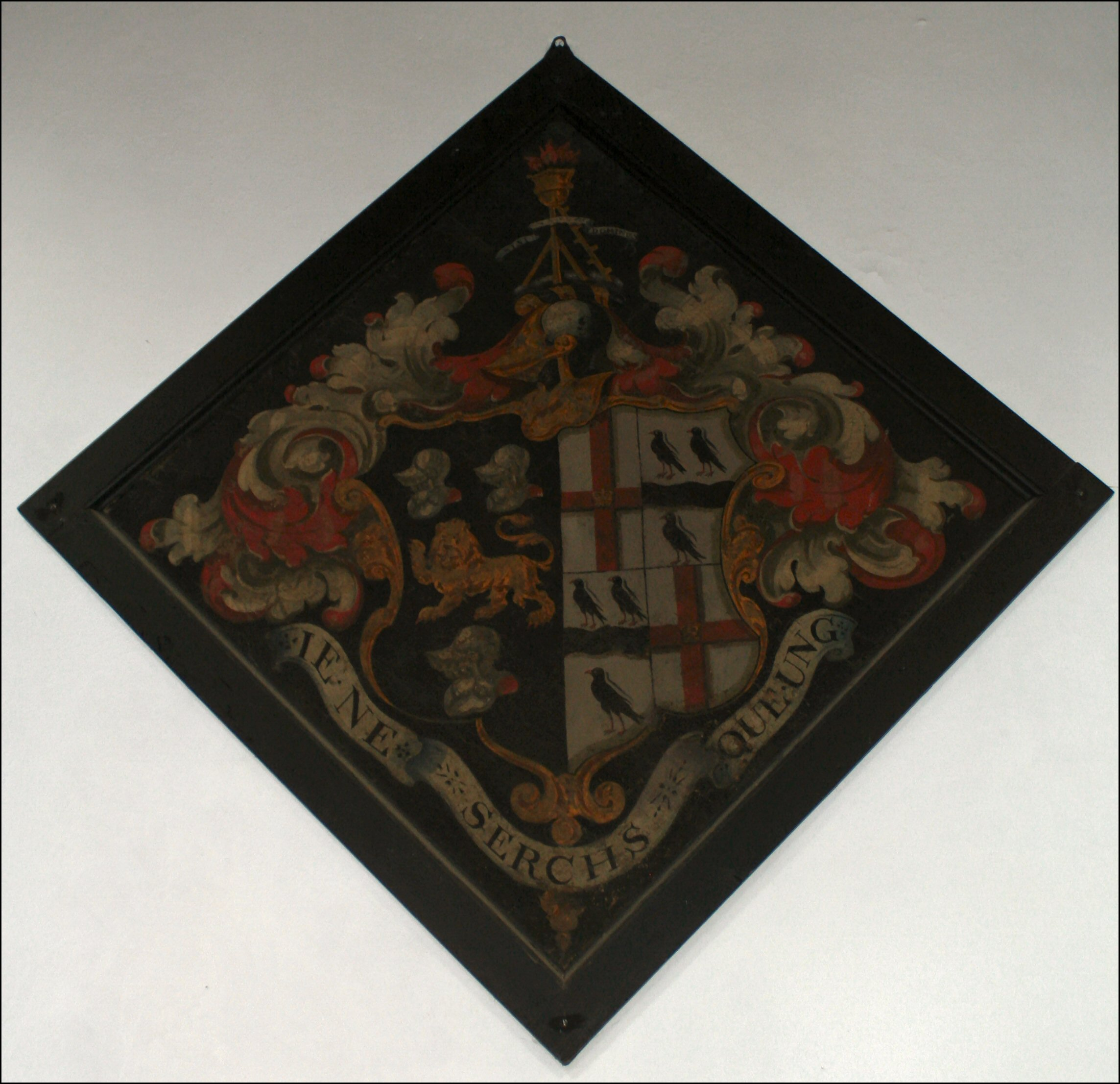
One of the hatchments

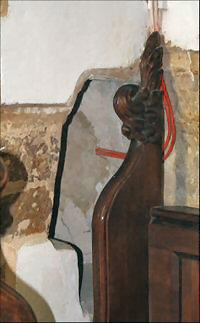
The squint - now partially blocked

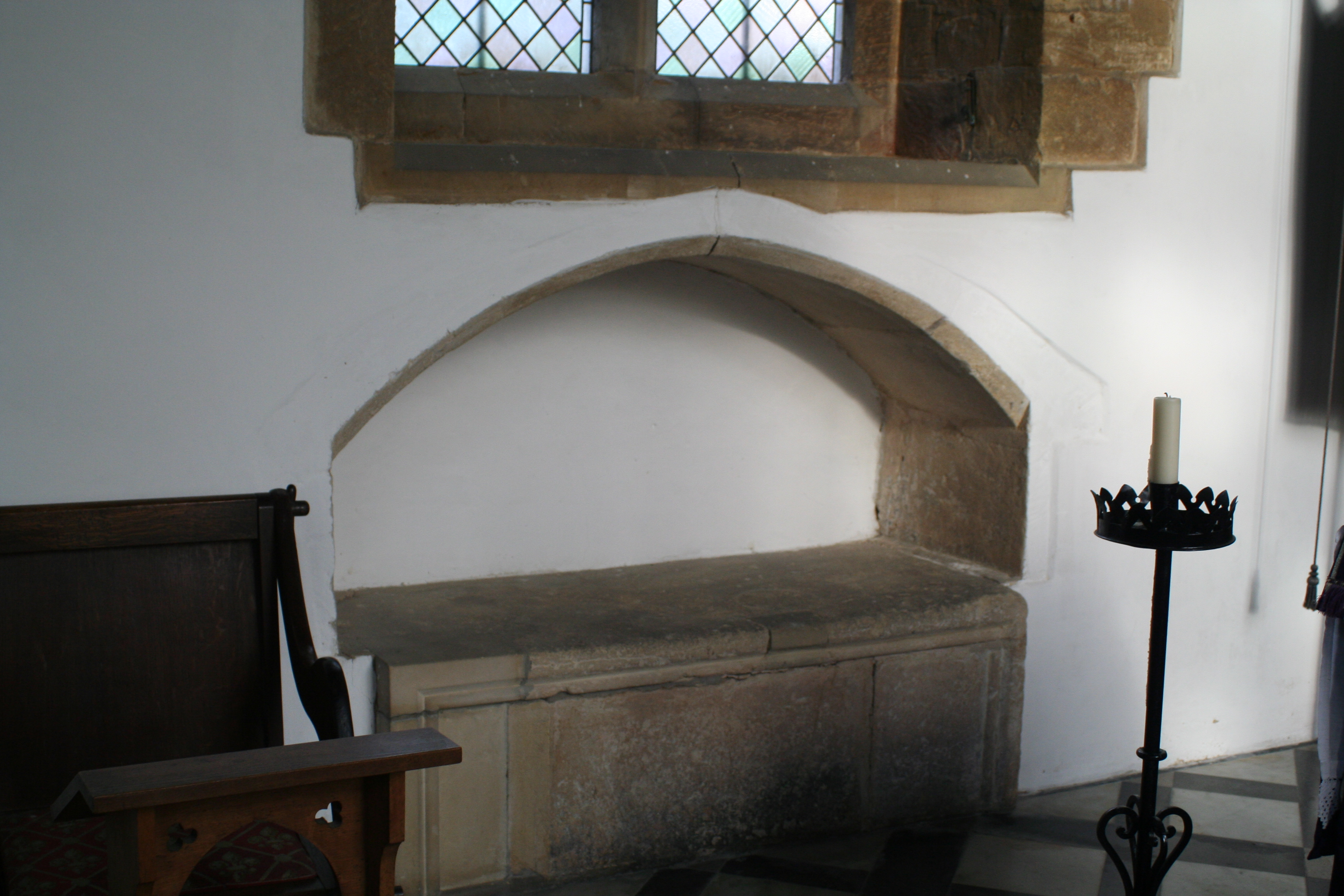
A tomb or Easter Sepulchre

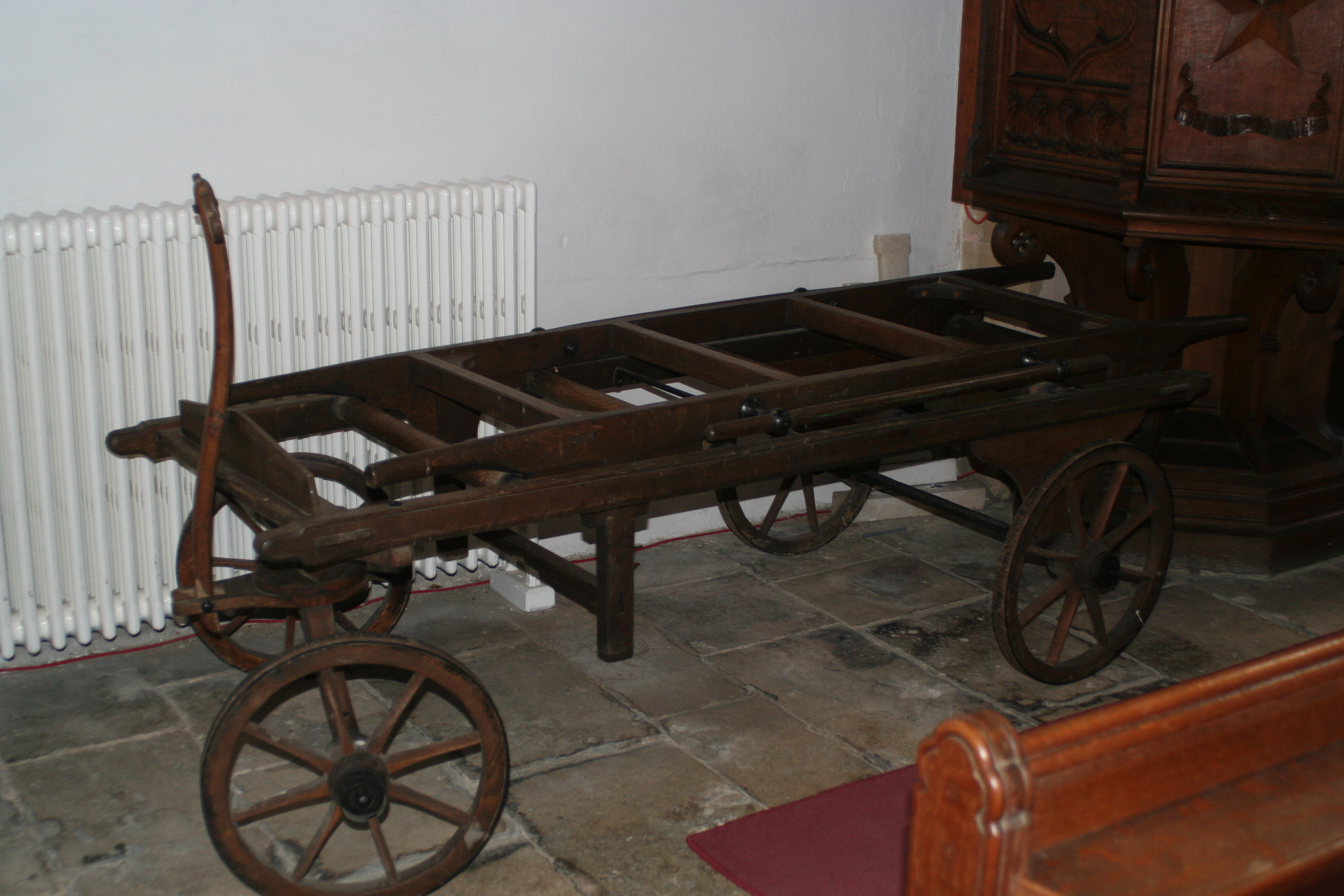
The bier

=== Grendon Hall ===
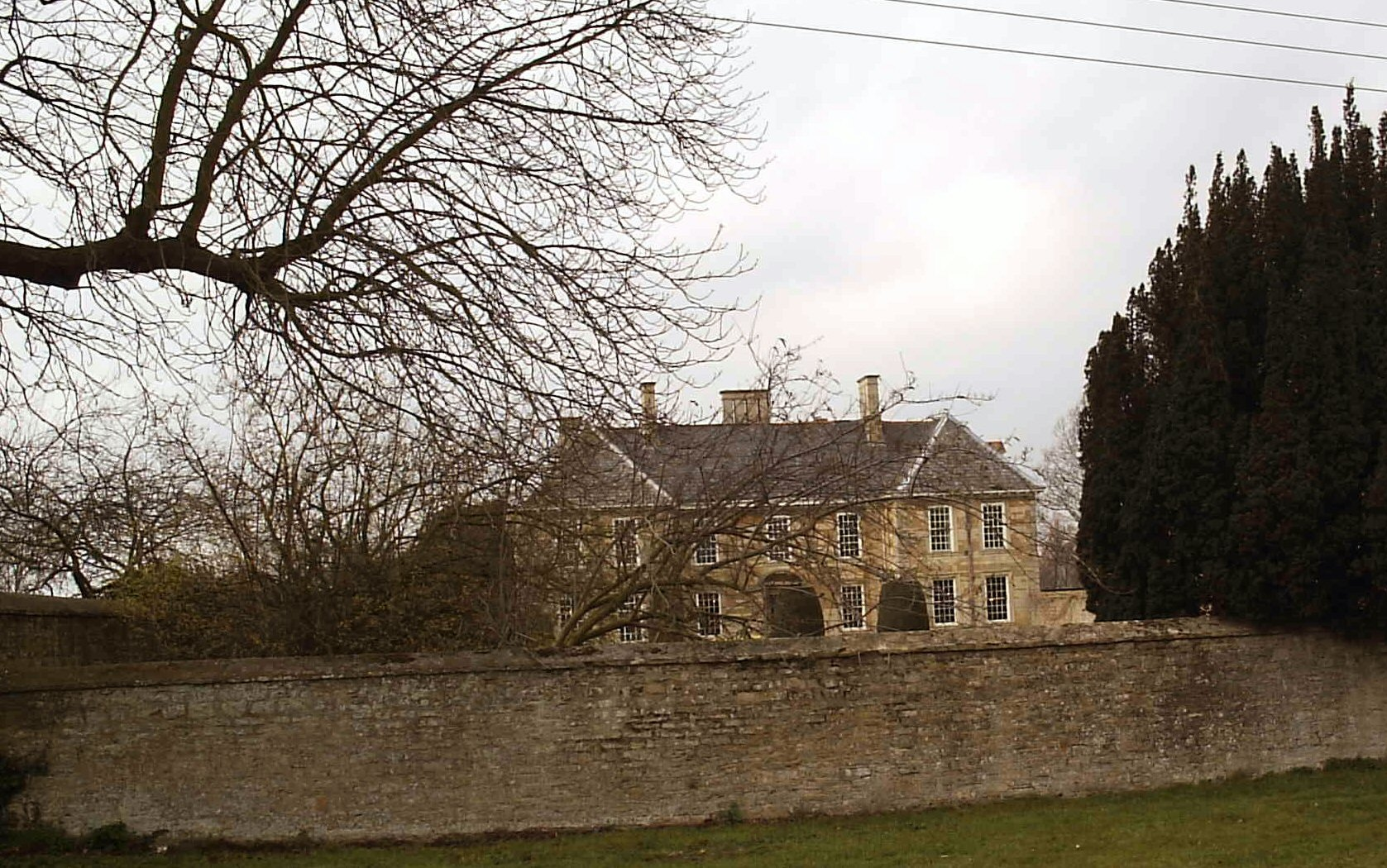
Grendon Hall

Most of the present hall dates from the 17th century when it was rebuilt by General Hatton Compton, although certain earlier parts date to the 1570s. Pevsner describes the east front as being "fine" quality. It is thought to be the work of John Lumley of Northampton.

In World War II, the hall was used by the Secret Intelligence Branch (SI) of the American Office of Strategic Services (OSS) as a staging grounds and holding area for Operation SUSSEX. Contrary to popular misconception, the Special Operations Executive did not have any officers stationed here, as they were stationed at the other Grendon Hall, in Buckinghamshire.

Next to the present site of Grendon Hall, but on the other side of the brook is the site of a much earlier medieval manor house owned by Richard de Harrington, whose fish ponds remain today as part of the grounds of the present hall.

In 1946, after the death of the then owner Miss Mundy, the hall was sold to the County Council. The hall was re-opened by the then Princess Elizabeth in 1946.

=== The Old Parsonage ===
The house was designed by S.S. Teulon and built in 1850. Pevsner describes it as a "...picturesque Tudor with an odd lantern with cupola; handsome gabled with mullioned windows." It is now a private house.

== Amenities ==
Grendon has the following sports and activities:

- 1st Grendon Beavers & Cubs
- Grendon Bellringers
- Grendon Cricket Club
- Grendon Over 60s - Age Concern
- Grendon Playgroup
- Grendon Sapphires Football Club
- Grendon Village Twinning Association (with Bois-Bernard, Nord-Pas de Calais, France)
- Half-Crown Share Club
- Mums & Tots
- Rainbows & Brownies
- Women's Institute

=== Charities ===
The village has three small charities:

- Charles Markham memorial trust
- Poor's Close (set up with land bequeathed by the Rev Robert Shelbourne)
- Richard Piper Coles will trust

== Gallery ==
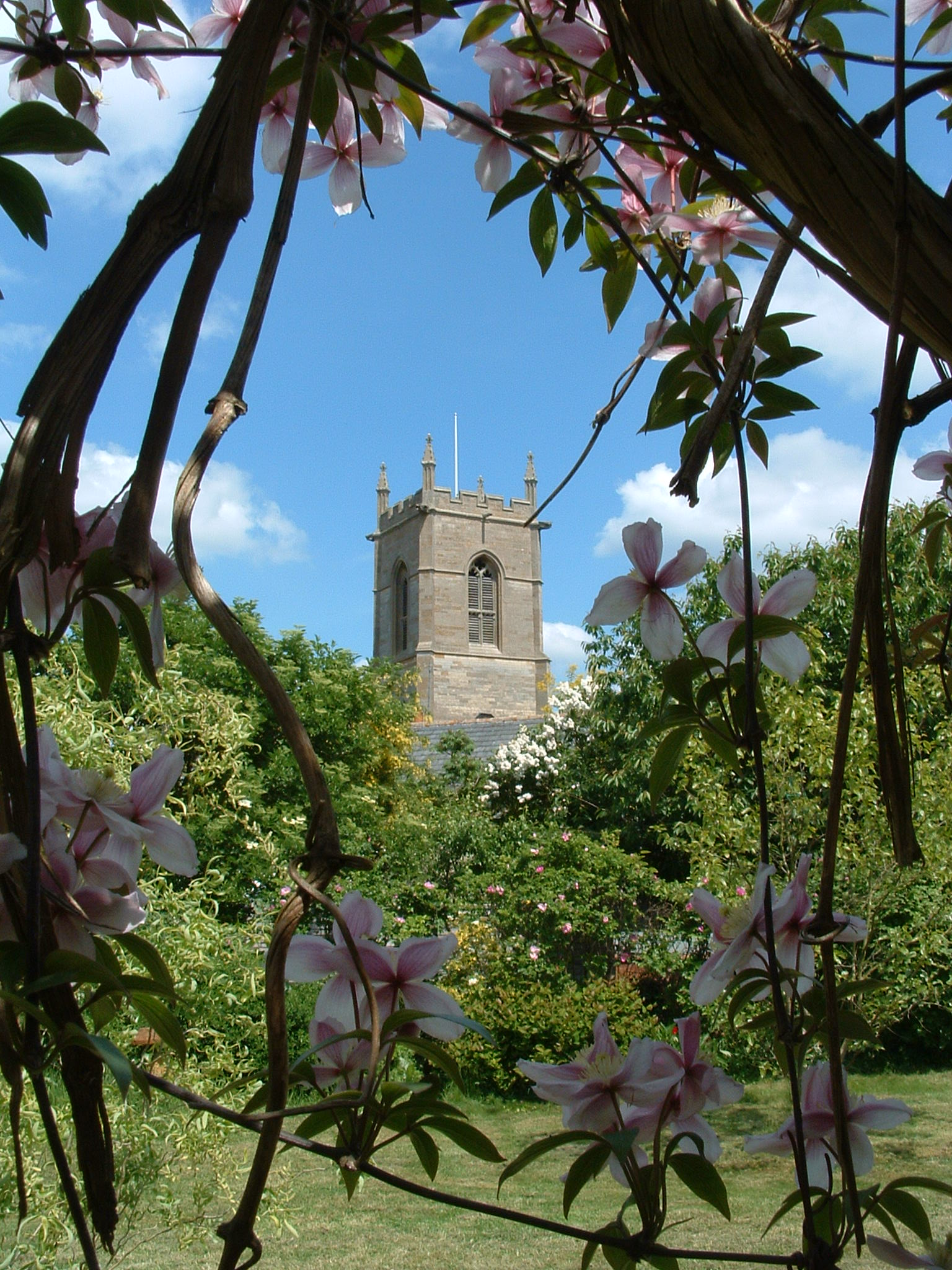
St Mary's Church tower through the clematis

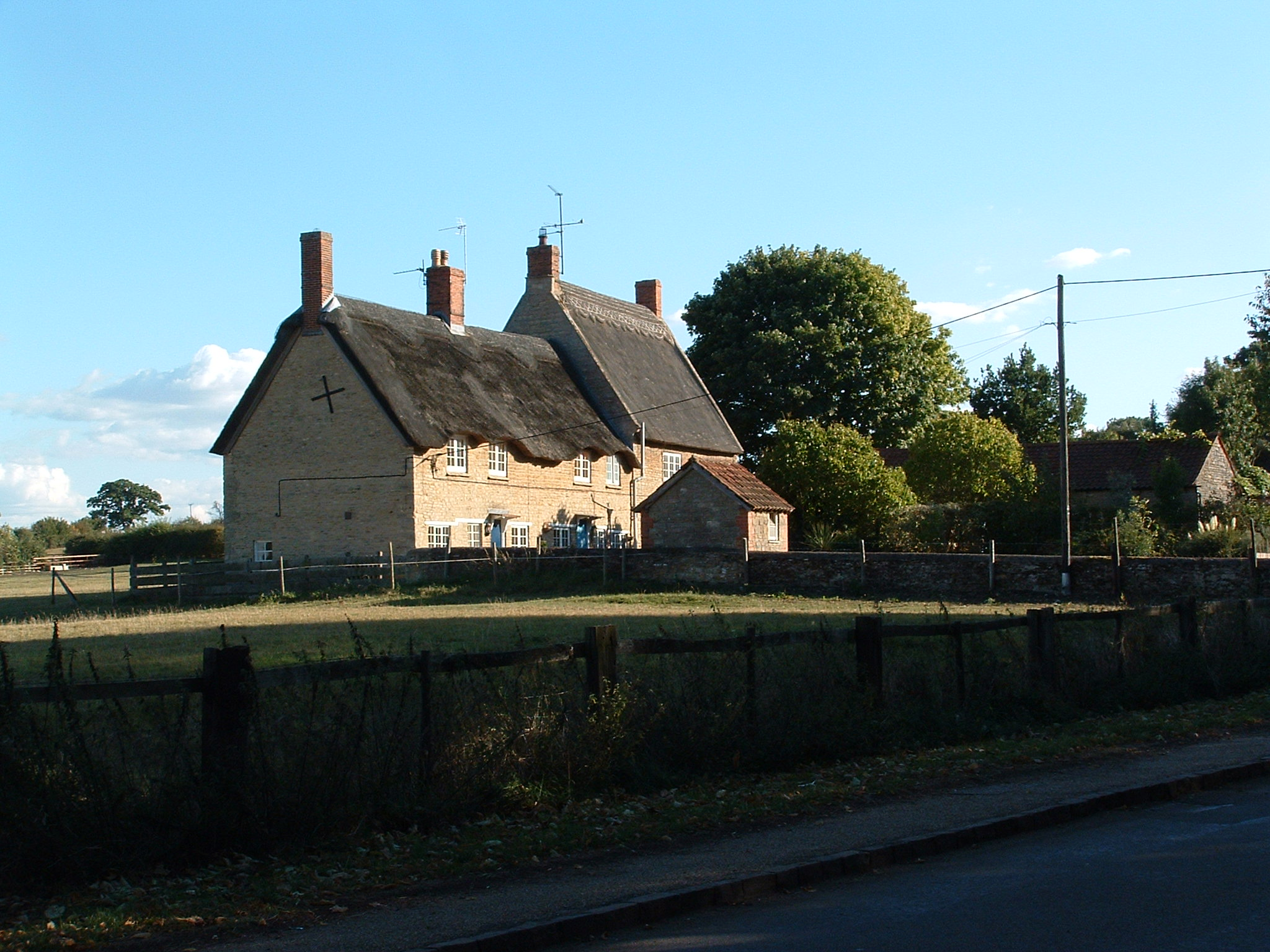
Thatched cottages on Main Road

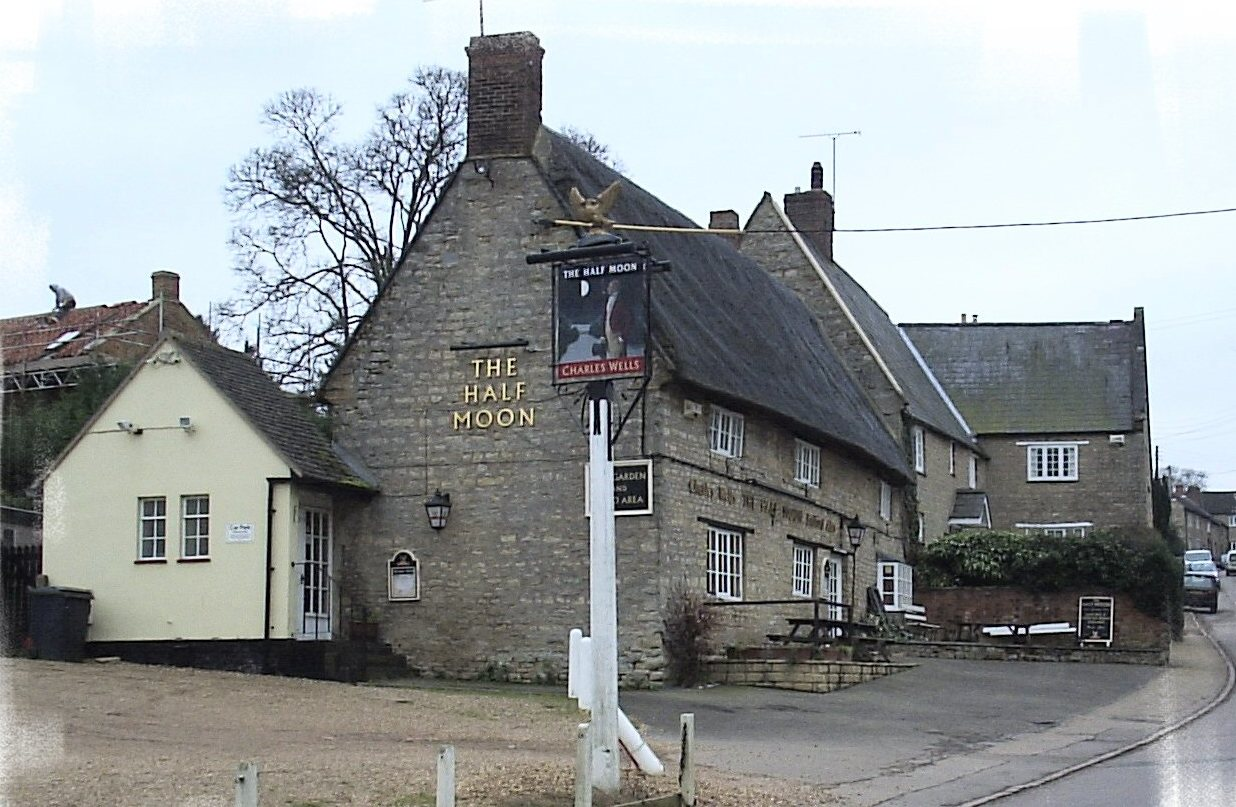
The Half Moon public house

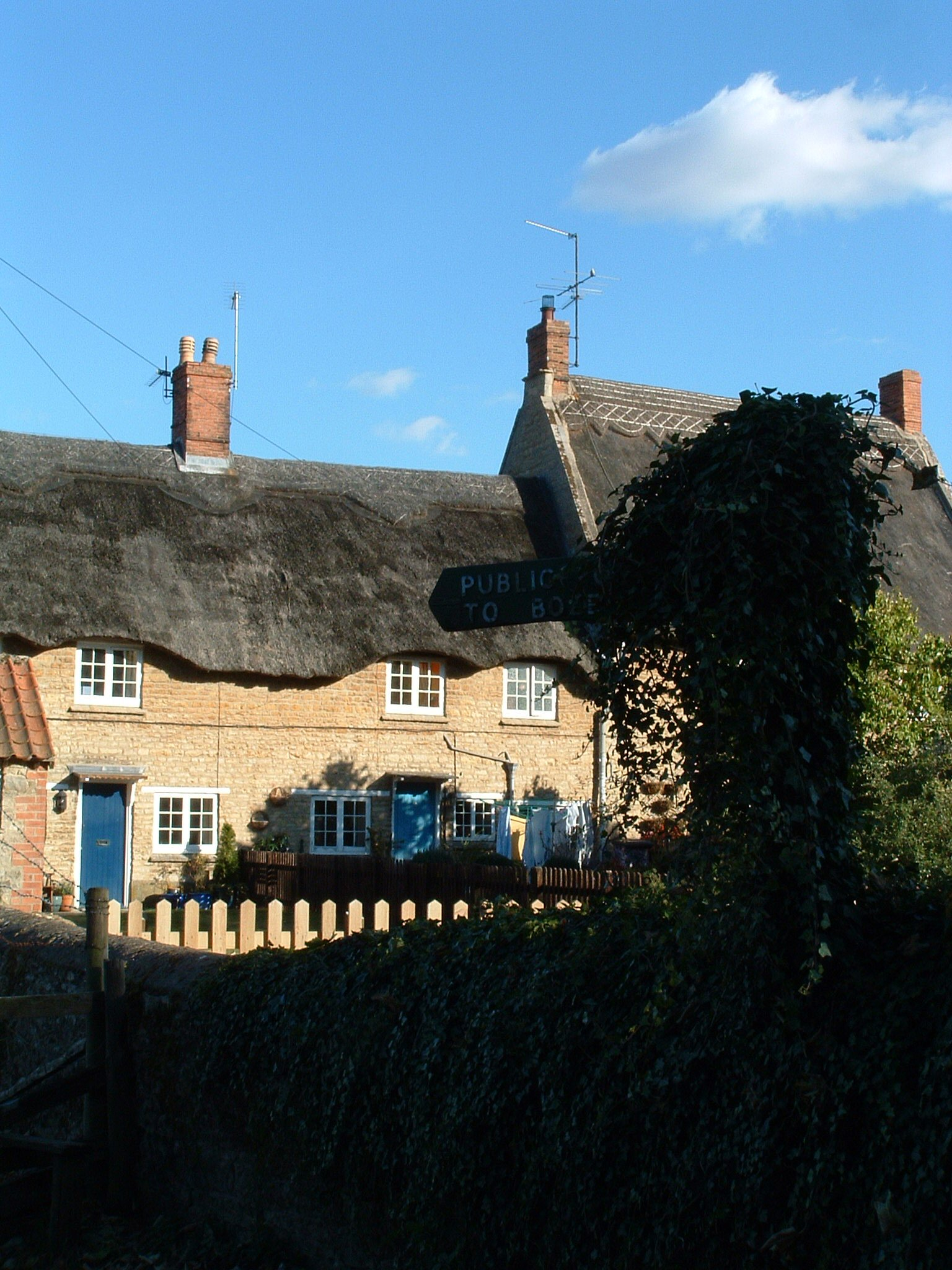
Main Road

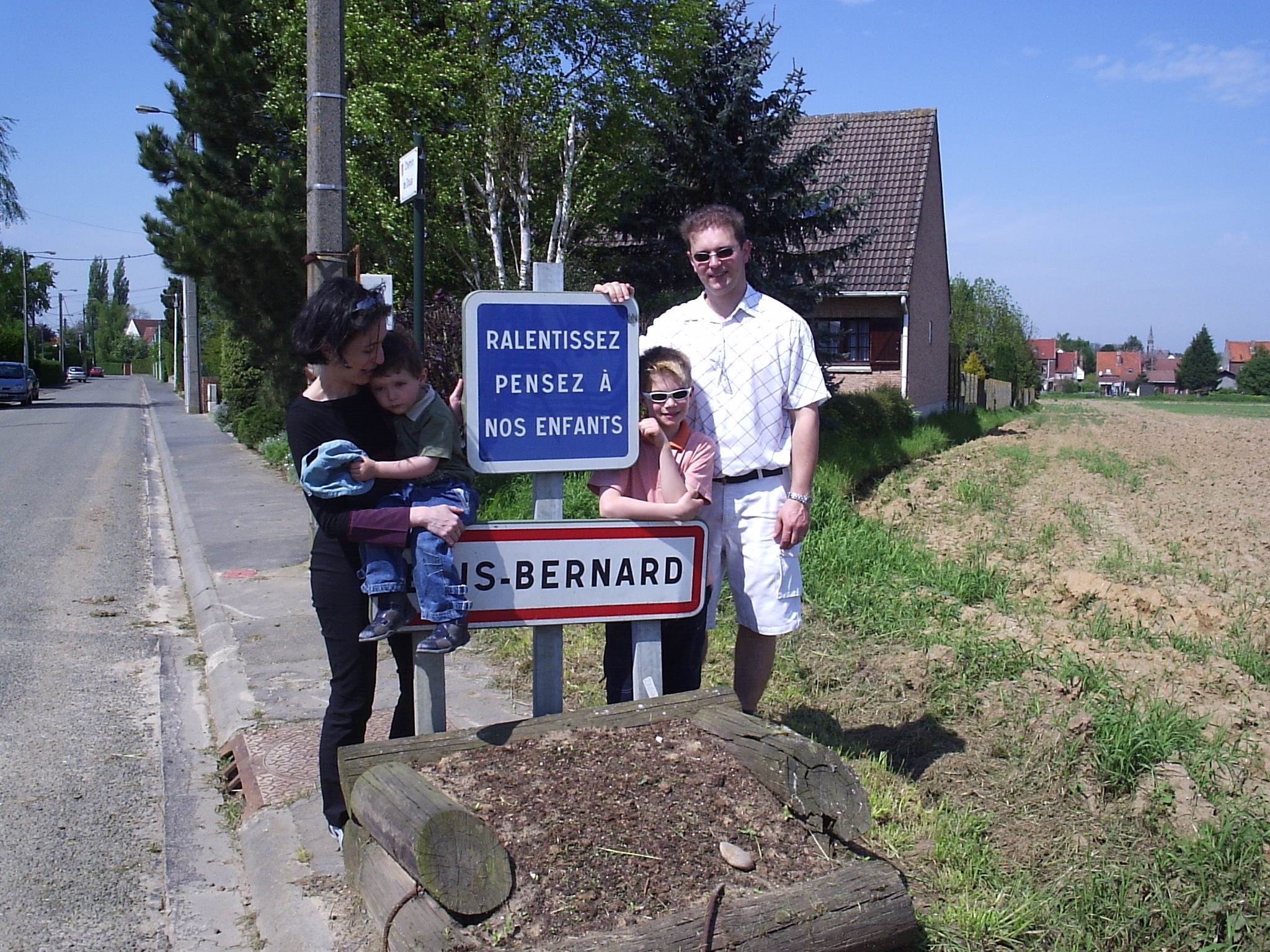
Some French hosts on the 2005 twinning visit to Bois-Bernard

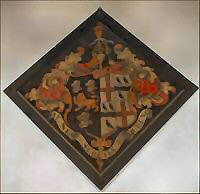
A funerary hatchment from St Mary's Church

== See also ==
- Grendon, Warwickshire
- Grendon Underwood
