= Richard Tomlins (merchant) =

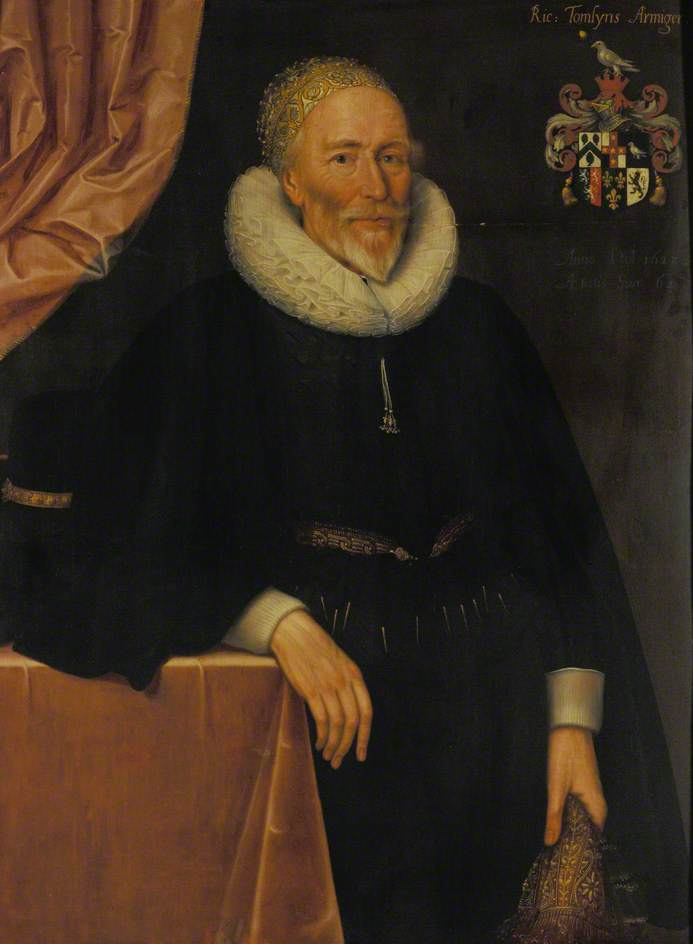
Richard Tomlins in 1628, Bodleian Library, Oxford

Richard Tomlins or Tomlyns (?1564–1650) was an English merchant resident in the City of Westminster who funded the first studies in anatomy at Oxford University..

In the autumn of 1623 Tomlins proposed to fund a readership in Anatomy at Oxford. His proposal was accepted, and the governing documents for the Tomlins Readership in Anatomy were formally adopted on 1 October 1624. The lectureship was attached to the Regius Professor of Physic, and Tomlins nominated "his worthy friend Thomas Clayton" to be first reader. The readership included an annual stipend of £25.

Outside of the readership, the details of Tomlins' life are "little known".

A portrait of Tomlins by Marcus Gheeraerts the Younger has been with the Bodleian Library since at least 1759.
