= Richard Tomlins (judge) =

Richard Tomlins (d. after 1660) was an English judge who served as Baron of the Exchequer during the Interregnum.

Tomlins was the son of Edward Tomlins, of Tiddenham, Gloucestershire. He was admitted at Inner Temple in November 1605.

Tomlins was assigned to assist John Bastwick and Henry Burton in their complaint against their cruel punishment by the star chamber and in 1641 they were compensated by the Long Parliament. In 1645 all the cursitor barons had gone to join the king at Oxford except for Thomas Trevor who was in poor health. Tomlins was therefore recommended as cursitor baron and became a bencher of his inn in that year. Following the death of the King in 1649 he was sworn as Baron of the Exchequer and held the position until the Restoration in 1660. He was described as a garrulous humourist on the basis of a transcript of a speech he gave to the Sheriffs of London in 1659.

In 1650 he supported the corporation of Ludlow in claims against the estate of his relation Richard Tomlins, member of Parliament for Ludlow in the 1620s.
