= Richard Tomlins (politician) =

Richard Tomlins or Tomlyns (1565 in Ludlow – 1650) was an English politician who sat in the House of Commons between 1621 and 1629. He was made an honorary member of Lincoln's Inn in 1625.

Tomlins was born in Ludlow, and was probably the son of the common councillor Richard Tomlins. He was resident in the precincts of Westminster Abbey by 1614. In 1621, he was elected Member of Parliament for Ludlow and was re-elected MP for Ludlow in 1624. He was elected MP for Ludlow again in 1625, 1626 and 1628 and sat until 1629 when King Charles dispensed with parliament for eleven years.

Tomlins was gravely ill in 1632–34, and retired to Richmond, Surrey, where he was buried in 1650. His will was proved on 17 December 1650 despite a legal claim against his estate by the corporation of Ludlow; this claim was pursued on behalf of the corporation by his relation Richard Tomlins who served as a Baron of the Exchequer (judge) during the Interregnum.

Parliament of England
| Preceded by Sir Henry Townsend; Robert Berry | Member of Parliament for Ludlow; 1621; With: Henry Spencer, Lord Compton 1621; Ralph Goodwin 1624–1629 | Parliament suspended until 1640 |
