= Spencer Compton, 2nd Earl of Northampton =

English politician (1601–1643)

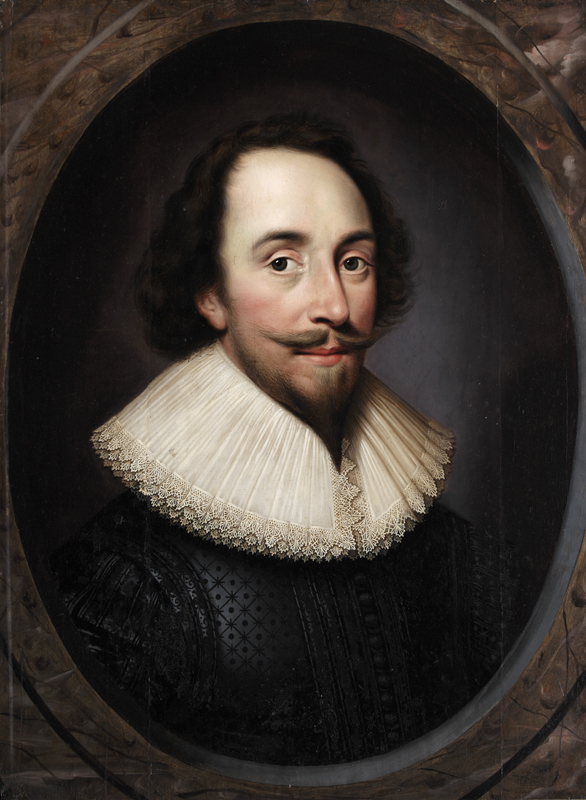
Spencer Compton circa 1630

Spencer Compton, 2nd Earl of Northampton (May 1601 – 19 March 1643), styled Lord Compton from 1618 to 1630, was an English soldier and politician who sat in the House of Commons from 1621 to 1622. He became a peer by writ of acceleration in 1626 and by inheritance in 1630. He fought in the Royalist army and was killed in action at the Battle of Hopton Heath.

== Life ==
Northampton was the son of William Compton, 1st Earl of Northampton, and his wife Elizabeth, daughter and heir of Sir John Spencer, Lord Mayor of London. He was created a Knight of the Bath on 3 November 1616. In 1621 he was elected Member of Parliament for Ludlow. Also in 1621, he was appointed Master of the Robes to the Prince of Wales and attended the latter in the adventure to Spain in 1623. He warmly supported the king in the Scottish expeditions, at the same time giving his advice for the summoning of the parliament, which "word of four syllables" he declared was "like the dew of heaven". In 1626, he became Baron Compton by writ of acceleration. In 1630 he inherited the Earldom on the death of his father in 1630 and assumed his duties as Lord Lieutenant of Gloucestershire and Lord Lieutenant of Warwickshire.

== Military career ==
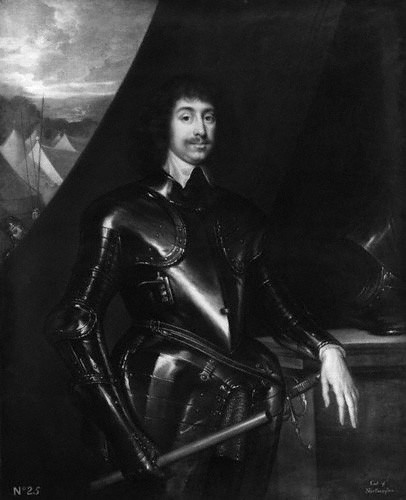
Spencer Compton was killed in action at the Battle of Hopton Heath.

On the outbreak of the English Civil War, Northampton was entrusted with the execution of the Commission of Array in Warwickshire. After varying success and failure in the English Midlands, he fought at the Battle of Edgehill and, after Charles I of England's return to Oxford, was given, in November 1642, the military supervision of Banbury and the neighbouring country. He was attacked in Banbury by the parliamentary forces on 22 December, but relieved by Prince Rupert of the Rhine the next day.

In March 1643, he marched from Banbury to relieve Lichfield and, having failed there, proceeded to Stafford, which he occupied. Thence on 19 March, accompanied by three of his sons, he marched out with his troops and engaged Sir John Gell, 1st Baronet and Sir William Brereton at the Battle of Hopton Heath.

He put to flight the enemy's cavalry and took eight guns, but in the moment of victory, while charging too far in advance, he was surrounded by the parliamentarian soldiers. To those who offered him a quarter, he answered that he scorned to take a quarter from such base rogues and rebels as they were, whereupon he was slain by a blow on the head. Edward Hyde, 1st Earl of Clarendon, describes his loss as a great one to the cause.

== Personal life ==
Northampton married Mary, daughter of Sir Francis Beaumont, brother of Mary Villiers, Countess of Buckingham in 1621. Wedding celebrations at Burley House in Rutland were attended by James VI and I, and the festivities included a performance of Ben Jonson's Masque of Gypsies.

Northampton and Mary had two daughters and six sons. The four eldest sons were Cavaliers in the Civil War, often seeing action together.

- James (1622–1681) succeeded his father as 3rd Earl of Northampton
- Charles (c. 1624–1661) MP for Northampton in 1661
- William (c. 1625–1663) one of the original members of the Royalist organisation, The Sealed Knot
- Spencer (c. 1629–1659), knighted in 1643 on the same day as Charles and William; died in Bruges
- Francis (c. 1629–1716) MP for Warwick from 1664 to 1679
- Henry (1632–1713) bishop of London from 1675 to 1713
- Anne married Sir Hugh Cholmeley, 4th Baronet, MP for Northampton and Thirsk
- Penelope married Sir John Nicholas, MP for Ripon from 1661 to 1679

Mary, Countess of Northampton, died on 18 March 1654 at Queen's Street in London.

Parliament of England
Preceded by Sir Henry Townsend; Robert Berry	Member of Parliament for Ludlow; 1621–1622; With: Richard Tomlins	Succeeded by Richard Tomlins; Ralph Goodwin
Political offices
Preceded by The Earl of Northampton	Lord Lieutenant of Gloucestershire; 1630–1643 with The Lord Chandos (1641–1643)	Vacant English Interregnum
Preceded by The Earl of Northampton	Lord Lieutenant of Warwickshire; 1630–1643	Vacant English Interregnum
Peerage of England
Preceded by William Compton	Earl of Northampton; 5th creation 1630–1643	Succeeded by James Compton
Preceded by William Compton	Baron Compton (writ in acceleration); 1626–1643	Succeeded by James Compton
