= Rivett =

Rivett may refer to:

== People ==
- Alan Rivett (born 1956), Australian international speedway rider
- Albert Rivett (pastor) (1855–1934), Australian pacifist
- Chris Rivett (born 1979), English sporting club chairman
- Christine Rivett (1891–1962), Australian doctor
- Sir David Rivett (1885–1961), Australian chemist and science administrator
- Francis Rivett (c. 1596–1669), English landowner and politician
- Leroy Rivett (born 1976), English rugby footballer
- Mitch Rivett (born 1989), Australian rugby league player
- Paul Rivett (born 1978), British racing driver
- Rivett Henry Bland (1811–1894), settler and government administrator in colonial Australia
- Rohan Rivett (1917–1977), Australian journalist and prisoner of war
- Ron Rivett (1940–2023), American entrepreneur
- Ronald Rivett (1918–1977), Canadian politician
- Ryan Rivett, American hotelier
- Ryan Rivett (rugby league) (born 2002), Australian rugby league player
- Thomas Rivett (1679–1724), British politician
- Thomas Rivett (1713–1763), British barrister and politician

== Places ==
- Mount Rivett, Mac. Robertson Land, Antarctica
- Rivett, Australian Capital Territory, suburb of Canberra

== See also ==
- Rivett-Carnac baronets, United Kingdom
- Rivet (disambiguation)
- Rivette (disambiguation)
