= Glenunga International High School =

High school in Australia

Location
- 99 L'Estrange St; Glenunga, South Australia 5064; Australia; 34°56′57″S 138°38′06″E

Information
- Type: Public
- Motto: Labor Omnia Vincit (Latin for Work conquers all)
- Established: 1903 (as the Preparatory School for the SA School of Mines and Industries); 1963 (under the Department for Education)
- Principal: Wendy Johnson AM
- Faculty: 180
- Enrolment: 2340
- Houses: Air, Earth, Fire, Water
- Colours: Blue & gold
- Affiliation: Sports Association for Adelaide Schools
- Website: www.gihs.sa.edu.au

Glenunga International High School (GIHS), formerly Glenunga High School (GHS) and Adelaide Technical High School (ATHS), is a publicly-funded international school in Adelaide, South Australia. It is located approximately 4 km (2.5 mi) south-east of the Adelaide city centre in the suburb of Glenunga, between L'Estrange and Conyngham Streets, adjoining the major thoroughfare Glen Osmond Road. The school serves the surrounding suburbs of the cities of Unley, Burnside and the Adelaide Hills.

Glenunga offers the Ignite program for gifted students as well as the IB Diploma Programme. As of October 2024 the principal is Wendy Johnson.

== History ==
The school was established in 1903 from the defunct Adelaide Agricultural School (founded 1897 with Andrew Ferguson as headmaster) as the Preparatory School for the South Australian School of Mines and Industries. It was renamed the Junior Technical School in 1914 and then Adelaide Technical High School in 1918. The school and the Old Scholars Association marked 1998 as the centenary year.

It was located at the School of Mines building (which houses Brookman Hall — named for benefactor George Brookman) on the corner of North Terrace and Frome Road, now part of the City Campus East of Adelaide University. The school population outgrew the campus, so in 1964 it was relocated to its current location in Glenunga and fell under the jurisdiction of the Department for Education, with the school being renamed to Glenunga High School in 1974. Part of the site had previously been used as an abbatoir from 1882, known as 'Hills Slaughter Yard', supplying about half of Adelaide's meat requirements

It adopted its current name upon the introduction of the International Baccalaureate Diploma Programme in 1990–91 with the aid of The Honourable Greg Crafter, a development which was instigated to help save the school from closure due to dwindling student numbers. With enrolments rising, GIHS has subsequently attracted substantial government funding and construction projects, most notably the technology and science wing extensions, a new administration block, and a performing arts centre; since 2005 there have been various additional changes to the facilities, such as extra rooms.

The former Glenunga International High School logo was replaced from 2022 with a new brand image.

In 2013, development began for a new $10 million building to accommodate the growing number of students. This new building was accompanied by the renovation of the Music, Sciences and Art departments, as well as a new library. The development upgrades were completed in 2014.

In 2020, the construction for new buildings including technology facilities, science labs and classrooms began. The total cost of the new plan is roughly $32 million. The construction was completed at the start of 2022 for the introduction of year 7s into the school, which fully opened to students and staff in mid-Term 1.

In 2025 a series of email threats were made to the principal, Wendy Johnson OAM. Such threats caused a temporary rise in security surrounding the school and prompted police investigation.

== Student life ==
Glenunga International High School hosts an array of extracurricular groups, all of which are student-run. These include special-interest clubs, a variety of community service organisations, as well as various sporting teams. Glenunga has numerous student-led clubs, which include the crocheting, chess, K-Pop, and philosophy clubs, amongst others.

Glenunga International High School has an extensive student leadership model, which gives any student the opportunity to make change within the school community. This includes the Learner, International Mindedness, and Wellbeing Councils, student driven bodies who co-ordinate events and a number of other responsibilities.

== Academic performance ==
Glenunga continues to foster some of the academically highest-achieving students in the state.

In 2016, 20 students across both the SACE and IB diplomas achieved an ATAR of 99 or more — a score in the top 1% of students nationwide for that year.

== Notable staff members ==
- Daniel Becker – Sciences teacher
- Dave Dallwitz – Art teacher, c. 1954–1964
- Ivor Francis – Art teacher, 1944–1947
- Doru Frîncu (Francu) – P. E. teacher, 2009–2022
- Sam Kellett – English teacher, 2013–2014
- Geoff Kemp – English and Drama teacher
- Paul Mildren – Member of the Australian baseball team; Assistant Principal Wellbeing & Learner Support, 2015–present
- Joe Scalzi – Social sciences, 2008–2010
- Rex Wright – P. E. teacher, 2011–2020

== Notable alumni and alumnae ==
=== G(I)HS (1974–present) ===
- Stanley Browning – Actor
- Leanne Choo – Australian representative at the 2012 and 2016 Olympics in badminton
- William Henzell – Represented Australia at the 2004 and 2008 Olympics in table tennis
- Finegan Kruckemeyer – Playwright
- Giang Nguyen – Mathematician
- Raphaela Wiget – Australian Ninja Warrior contestant, seasons 3 and 4
- Cameron Wood – AFL footballer with the Brisbane Lions (2005–2007), Collingwood Football Club (2008–2012), and Carlton Football Club (2014–2016)

=== ATHS ===
- Peter Badcoe – Victoria Cross recipient. Killed in action during the Vietnam War
- Mark Brindal – Politician
- Sir Walter Crocker – Diplomat, Lieutenant-Governor of South Australia
- Bruce R. Davis – Electronics engineer
- Maurice de Rohan – Engineer, Agent General for South Australia
- Norm Duncan – VFL footballer with South Melbourne
- Merle Honor Marten – Holden artist, Mayoress of Port Adelaide
- Harry Medlin – Deputy Chancellor of the University of Adelaide
- Vince Monterola – CEO of the SA Country Fire Service
- Ong Teng Cheong – President of Singapore, politician, architect, town planner
- Kevin Peek – Classical/rock guitarist
- Reg Sprigg – Geologist, conservationist
- James Cyril Stobie – Inventor of the Stobie pole
- Alfred Traeger – Inventor of the pedal radio

=== Adelaide Agricultural School (1897–1902) ===
- Sir Richard Layton Butler
- A. E. V. Richardson
