= Rivet (disambiguation) =

A rivet is a mechanical fastener.

Rivet or rivets may also refer to:

- Rivet (surname), a list of people so named
- Rivet (horse), a racehorse
- Apache Rivet, an Apache Software Foundation project
- Rivet High School (Vincennes, Indiana), a Roman Catholic private school
- Rivets, a comic strip syndicated by cartoonist George Sixta
- Rivet, a fictional character from the video game Ratchet & Clank: Rift Apart
- Fast Workers, a 1933 film also titled Rivets
- Rivets, a Scottish soft drink launched as competitor for Irn Bru
- Rivet Town, a fictional town in the 2005 Blue Sky Studios film Robots

== See also ==
- PRR 4800, an electric locomotive nicknamed "Old Rivets"
- RC-135V/W Rivet Joint, a reconnaissance aeroplane built by Boeing
- Rivett (disambiguation)
- Rivette (disambiguation)
