= Edith Constance Murray =

Australian puppeteer and schoolteacher

- fair use image
- Born: Edith Constance Blackwell; 26 February 1897; North Sydney
- Died: 30 January 1988 (aged 90); Waterfall
- Education: University of Sydney
- Occupations: teacher and puppeteer
- Known for: puppetry
- Spouse: Rowland Charles Murray

Edith Constance Murray BEM born Edith Constance Blackwell (26 February 1897 – 30 January 1988) was an Australian puppeteer and schoolteacher.

== Life ==
Murray was born in 1897 in North Sydney. She was the first child of Flora Emily (born Fletcher) and Harry Le Tissier Blackwell. Her mother had been born in Australia but her father who had a tobacco shop had been born in the UK's Channel Islands. She graduated as a qualified teacher from the University of Sydney in 1920. In 1922 she began a marriage to an accountant named Rowland Charles Murray. She had two sons.

She discovered glove puppets and their ability to entertain and teach children while working as a governess for children at the Bidura House children's home from 1937 to 1946. The home looked after children who were expected to appear at court and children who were anticipating finding foster parents.

The Children's Library and Crafts Movement had been founded in 1934 by two sisters, Elsie Rivett and Mary Matheson The eighth branch was opened in 1942 in Katoomba. It was Murray who organised the first use of puppets in their movement. In June 1949 the Sydney Herald announced weekly shows for children at the Children's Theatre at Burnie Park, Clovelly. The theatre accommodated marionette and glove puppet performances and the children were encouraged to write their own plays and to construct their own puppets. The theatre's work was supported by loaned puppets (from William Dalziel (Bill) Nicol in Melbourne) and the Children's Library and Crafts Movement. Leading Australian puppeteers Richard Bradshaw, Norman Hetherington and John Lewis of Jeral Puppets were among those who demonstrated their skills at the theatre. Murray remained as the director of the theatre until 1982.

Murray died in the Sydney suburb of Waterfall in 1988.
