= Adelaide Agricultural School =

School in South Australia

Adelaide Agricultural School, generally referred to within South Australia as "the Agricultural School", was a short-lived Government-run fee-charging school for boys, often viewed as preparation for Roseworthy Agricultural College.

The school opened in 1897, with 60 students and Andrew Ferguson BSc. as headmaster, and occupied rooms in the Old Exhibition Building on Frome Road.

Several students were awarded scholarships to Roseworthy College, the first being John Adams in 1898. The school was characterized as more an "Advanced School for Boys" than an agricultural school and shut down by the Education Department at the end of 1902. The school had, however, a champion in Langdon Bonython, who persuaded the School of Mines to take it over as its preparatory school, which occurred early in 1903, with the agriculture subjects deleted. The school was renamed "School of Mines Preparatory School", then in 1914 "Junior Technical School", when fees were abolished, and under Principal F. W. Reed in 1918 became "Technical High School", later Adelaide Technical High School. Ferguson, who was also on the Corporate Town of St Peters council and at one time a candidate for mayor, remained headmaster until 1919, when he was replaced by Sidney Moyle.

Sir Richard Layton Butler was a student at Adelaide Agricultural School, as were CSIR chief A. E. V. Richardson BA, BSc., and Albert Henry Sanders, town clerk of Brighton.
