= Christine Rivett =

Australian medical practitioner and birth control advocate (1891–1962)

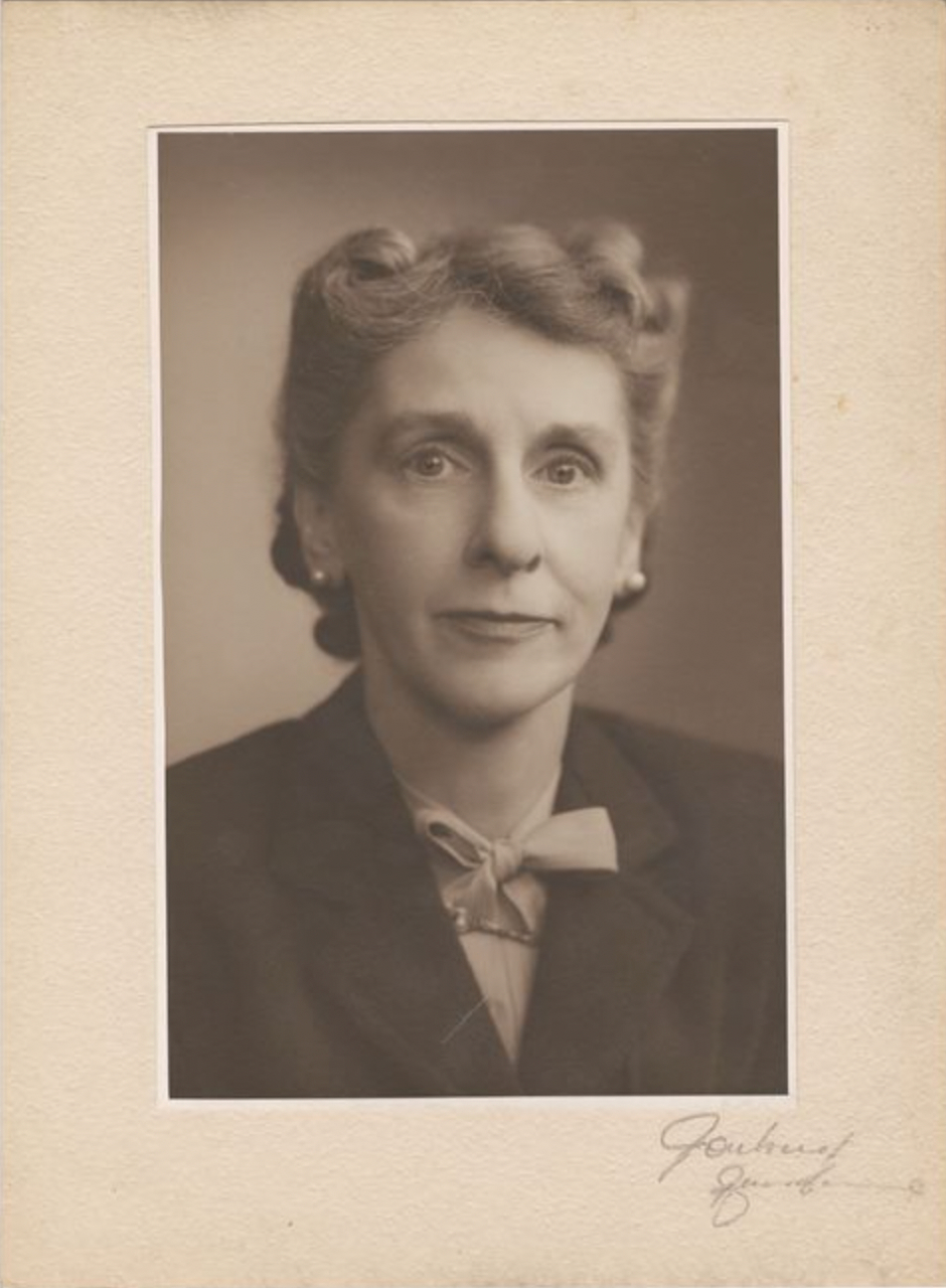
- Rivett, c.1950
- Born: Amy Christine Rivett; 28 February 1891; Yarrawonga, Victoria, Australia
- Died: 14 July 1962 (aged 71); Sydney, New South Wales, Australia
- Education: Sydney Girls High School
- Alma mater: University of Sydney
- Father: Albert Rivett
- Relatives: Albert Cherbury David Rivett (brother)

Amy Christine Rivett (28 February 1891 – 14 July 1962) was an Australian medical practitioner. Known as Christine Rivett, she was a birth control advocate.

== Early life and education ==
Amy Christine Rivett was born at Yarrawonga, Victoria on 28 February 1891. She was the sixth child of Elizabeth Mary Ann (née Cherbury) and Reverend Albert Rivett, a Congregational pastor and pacifist. Her sisters were the children's library founders Elsie Rivett and Mary Matheson, and women's educator Eleanor Harriett (Nell) Rivett.

She was educated at Sydney Girls High School and then studied medicine at the University of Sydney, graduating with a bachelor of medicine in 1915 and master of surgery in 1918.

== Career ==
Following her graduation in 1915, Rivett volunteered to serve in World War I but her offer was refused as women doctors were not accepted by the Australian government. Instead she was appointed resident medical officer at the Hospital for Sick Children in Brisbane. In 1917 she transferred to Brisbane General Hospital as resident medical officer and then to the Lady Bowen Hospital a year later in the same role. Part of her job as municipal medical officer was to monitor the health of prostitutes and inspect brothels.

In August 1918 Rivett opened a general practice in Wickham Terrace, Brisbane. She gave a talk at the Brisbane Lyceum Club on "Sex Hygiene" in 1922, while in the 1930s she advocated strongly for birth control, saying that it should be part of the upper school curriculum. She was, however, against abortion. She was one of the founding members of the Queensland Medical Women's Society.

She learnt to fly in 1929 and qualified in 1930 before being one of three women pilots who flew to Toowoomba to escort British aviator Amy Johnson to Brisbane following her London to Australia solo flight. She was fined £100 for understating her income as £863 instead of £3,393 in her 1928–29 tax return.

The Telegraph selected a quotation of Rivett's for its column, "Notable Sayings" in 1934:

If we do nothing else than live in history as a generation of women who, having been denied preparatory education in sex, yet gave to the next generation opportunity for education in self-knowledge and sex hygiene, with full technique in contraception as her preparation for maternity, then I say we shall have reason for deep inner happiness.

— Christine Rivett

Rivett visited England, France and Germany in 1936 to develop her knowledge and skills in gynaecological surgery and study tropical medicine. She was named as one of artist Vida Lahey's six outstanding women for her "for her brilliant gifts, courage and charm" in a quest to find Australia's most outstanding women held in 1936. She moved to Sydney in 1947 and practised medicine with her brother, Edward Rivett.

A bronze bust of Rivett by Daphne Mayo is held in the National Portrait Gallery.

Rivett died in Sydney on 14 July 1962.
