= Fred White (physicist) =

Australian physicist and researcher (1905–1994)

Sir Fred White KBE FAA FRS

Chairman of the CSIRO
- In office 1 July 1959 – 22 May 1970
- Preceded by: Ian Clunies Ross
- Succeeded by: Jerry Price

Chief Executive of the CSIRO
- In office 19 May 1949 – 13 December 1956
- Preceded by: A E V Richardson
- Succeeded by: Stewart Bastow

Personal details
- Born: Frederick William George White; May 26, 1905
- Died: August 7, 1994 (aged 89)
- Spouse: Elizabeth White

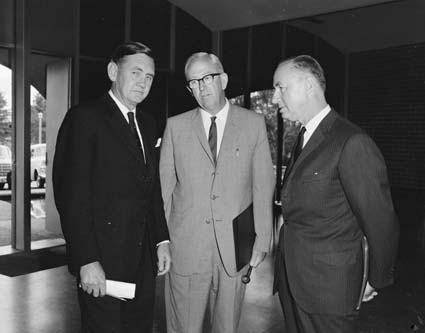
White (centre) at the Regional Meeting of National Scientific Research Organisations in 1964 with Senator John Gorton (minister-in-charge of the CSIRO) and UNESCO Director-General René Maheu

Sir Frederick William George White KBE FAA FRS (26 May 1905 – 17 August 1994) was a New Zealand-born Australian physicist and ornithologist who was Chairman of CSIRO from 1959 to 1970.

== Education and early life ==
White was born in 1905 in Johnsonville. He received his education at Wellington College and Victoria University College. Due to his academic performance, he won a scholarship from the University of New Zealand, and this award enabled him to attend St John's College, Cambridge, where he studied under Ernest Rutherford.

== Career and research ==
He taught at King's College London from 1932, and was lecturer at Canterbury College in Christchurch, New Zealand, from 1937. During World War II, White worked on secret projects developing radar in New Zealand and Australia.

=== Awards and honours ===
In the 1954 New Year Honours, he was appointed a Commander of the Order of the British Empire (CBE). In the 1962 Birthday Honours, this was elevated to the class of Knight Commander of the same order (KBE).

== Personal life ==
White died in Melbourne on 17 August 1994. His wife Elizabeth had died two years prior.
