= Super 8 (hotel) =

American economy motel chain

Super 8 by Wyndham Super 8 Worldwide, Inc.
- Industry: Hotels
- Predecessor: Main Street Inn
- Founded: 1974; 52 years ago, Aberdeen, South Dakota
- Founders: Ron Rivett; Dennis Brown
- Headquarters: Parsippany-Troy Hills, New Jersey, United States
- Number of locations: 2,691
- Area served: United States, Canada, China, Brazil, Germany, Saudi Arabia, United Arab Emirates, United Kingdom
- Parent: Wyndham Hotels & Resorts
- Website: www.wyndhamhotels.com/super-8

Super 8 by Wyndham, commonly known as Super 8, is an American hotel brand. It is the world's largest budget hotel chain, with over 2,600 locations worldwide. The chain is a subsidiary of Wyndham Hotels and Resorts. The original room cost was $8.88 per night. As of December 2022, the brand website listed 2,691 hotels worldwide.

== History ==
1982 to 2008

2008 to 2018

2018 to present

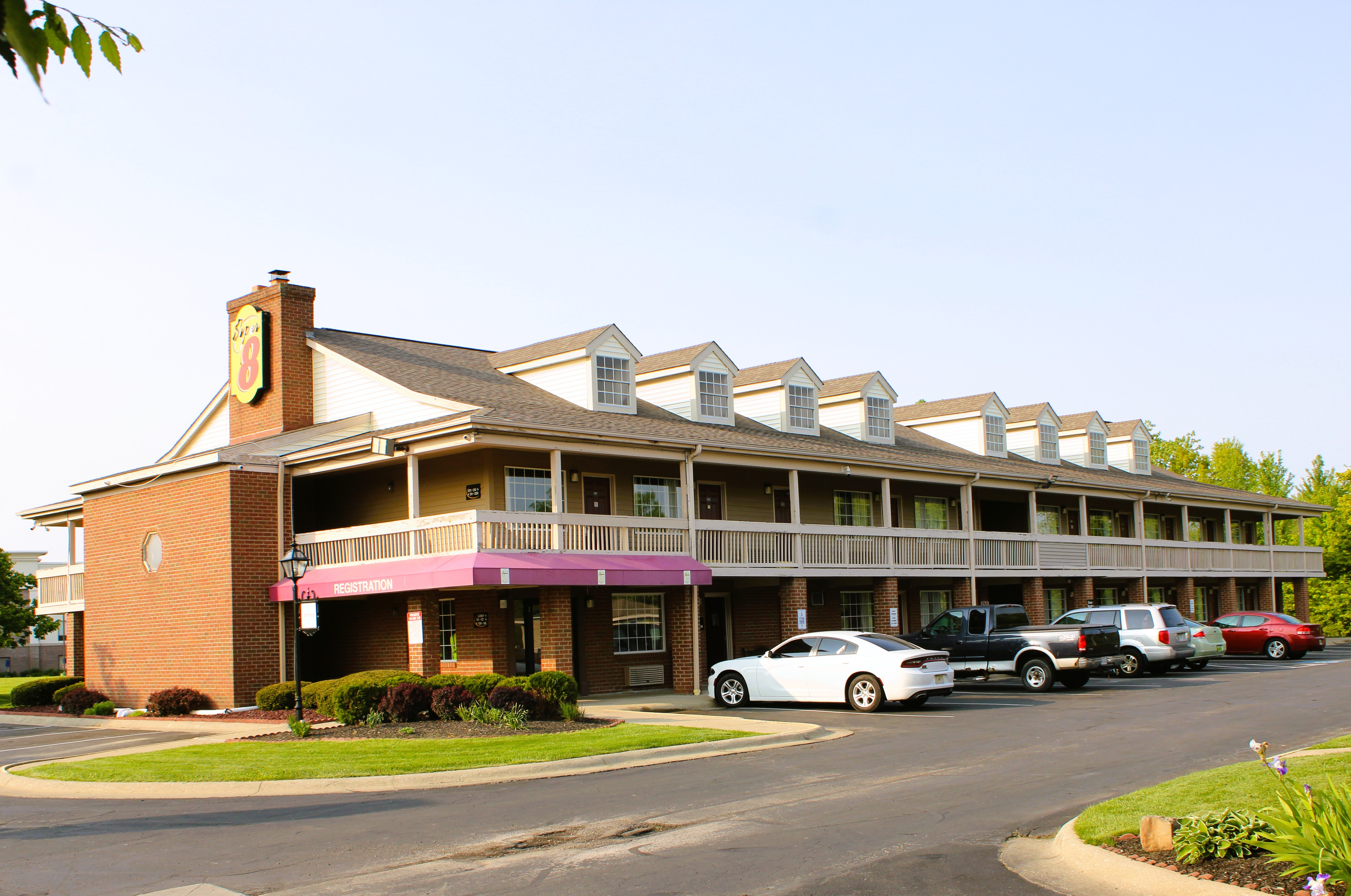
Super 8 in Marysville, Ohio

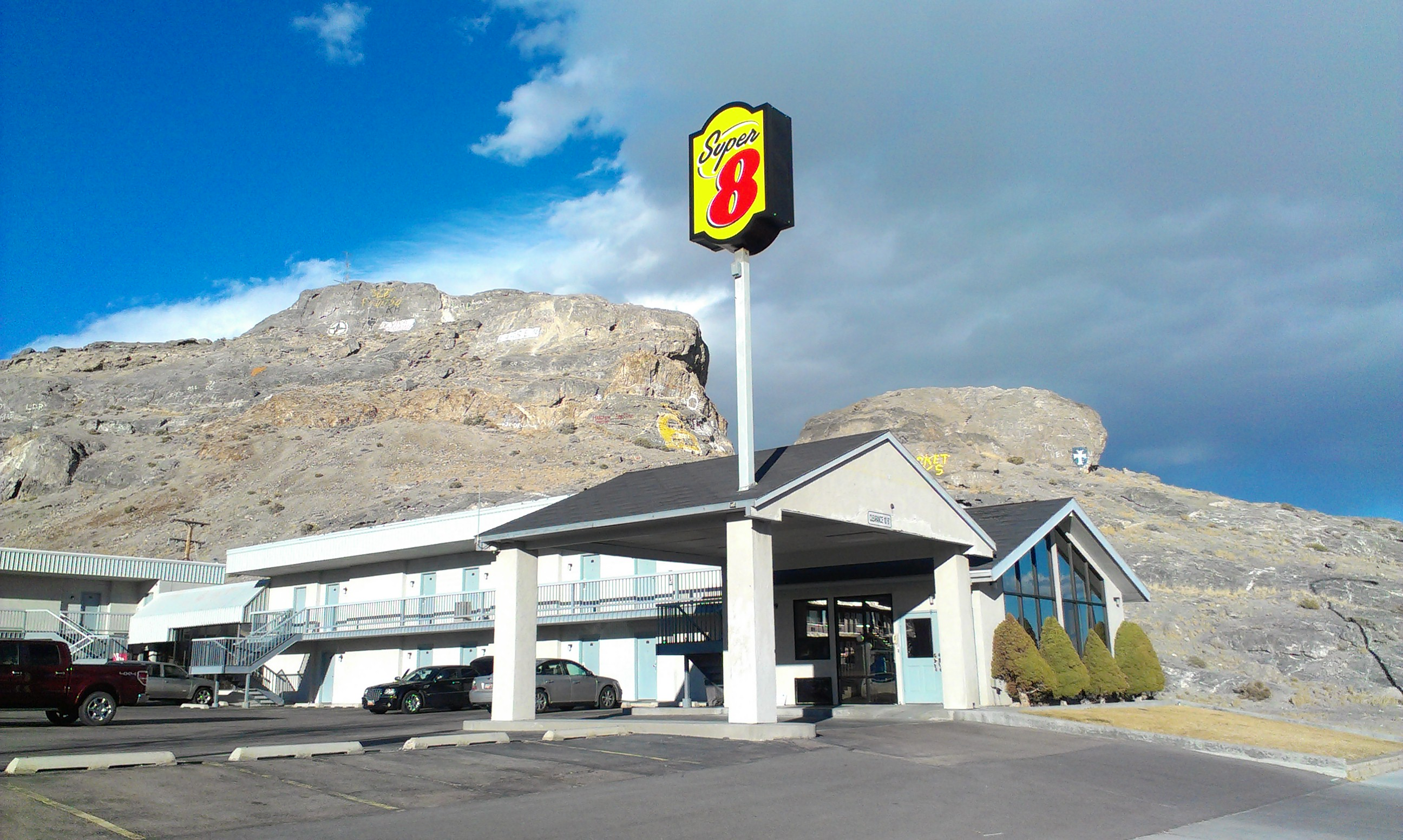
Super 8 in Wendover, Utah

=== Launch ===
Ron Rivett and Dennis Brown created the new Super 8 Motel corporation with each of them owning 50% of the stock in the new company. The original room rate was $8.88 (equivalent to $57.97 in 2025), hence the numeric brand name. The first Super 8, with 60 rooms, opened in Aberdeen, South Dakota, in 1974, built near a Holiday Inn with just some drawings made by Rivett as blueprints. The stucco exterior with an English Tudor style was inspired by Rivett's father-in-law, who was a stuccoer; the English Tudor style and placing of Super 8's near Holiday Inns was an established procedure for setting up new Super 8's for years to come.

Dennis Brown died in 1988. The 1,000 locations of the Super 8 chain were sold to Hospitality Franchise Systems, which became Cendant in 1993.

Super 8 had a frequent traveler program, the VIP club, which was introduced in 1976; it grew to over 7.6 million members. The VIP program was dissolved in December 2003 and replaced with the TripRewards program, which was renamed Wyndham Rewards in 2008.

=== Development ===
The first franchise was sold in 1976 and established in Gillette, Wyoming. By 1978, Super 8 expanded from the state of New York to the state of Washington and was no longer just a Midwestern company.

In 1981, groundbreaking for the 100th Super 8 Location began in Aberdeen, South Dakota; the birthplace of Super 8. In 1993, Super 8 opened its 1,000th property in Mount Vernon, Ohio. By 2001, Super 8 Motels had more than 2,000 motels worldwide.

Super 8 Worldwide entered the China market in 2004 by opening a Super 8 hotel (Chinese: 速8酒店 Su Ba Jiudian) in Beijing. By 2011, there were 680 Super 8 hotels mainly located in major cities of China.

In 2010, Super 8 replaced the beddings and redesigned the bathrooms.

In May 2013, Super 8 opened its first location in Turkey, in Istanbul. In May 2014, Super 8 opened its first location in the Middle East, in Riyadh. Super 8 came to the UK when it opened at Chester Motorway Services in 2023 after being rebranded from Days Inn, another one of Wyndham's hotel brands In April 2016, Super 8 opened its first German location in Munich.

=== 2016 brand overhaul ===
In May 2016, Super 8 remodelled its 1,800 rooms in the US and Canada and organized a big giveaway of old art and furniture. The brand jokingly organized an exhibition in New York called When the Art Comes Down: Works from the Super 8 Collection and featuring 100 pieces of their "not-so-super art", an event organized to communicate on the brand's design overhaul. In December 2016, another edition of the exhibition was organized in Miami.

In November 2016, Super 8 launched a new promotion for US Army veterans which included a reserved parking area in all US and Canada locations.

In May 2017, Super 8 launched a new marketing campaign that focused its targeting on road trippers, followed by the introduction in October 2019 of Super 8's first shared room, the ROOM8, a concept developed for young road trippers. In March 2018, Super 8 launched a concept Jeep Wrangler, the ROADM8, with body works and interiors reminiscent of the brand's redesigned hotels, and some unexpected features such as a coffee machine and a mini-fridge built in the central console of the back seats.

In 2019, Wyndham unveiled the shared room type that seeks to make better use of larger, underutilized room types.

== Amenities ==
The minimum standard Super 8 requires offering guests a complimentary breakfast item with beverages and free wireless Internet access. For a period, beginning in 2004, anyone that purchased a "See You Along The Way" coffee mug was entitled to free coffee, regardless if they stayed the night before or not, at any of the Super 8s.
