= A. E. V. Richardson =

Australian scientist and agronomist

A. E. V. Richardson CMG
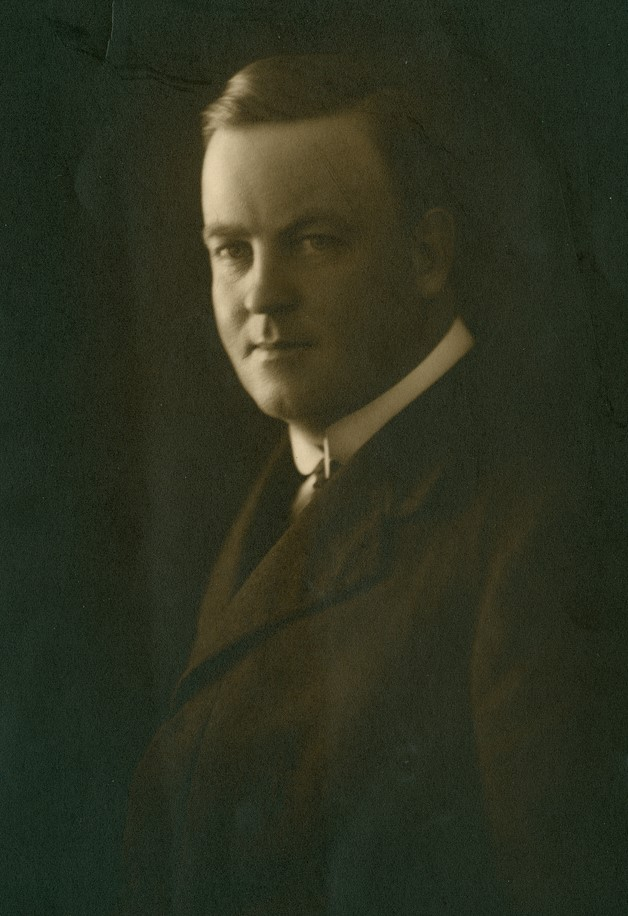
- Richardson circa 1929

Chief Executive of the CSIRO
- In office 1 January 1946 – 18 May 1949
- Preceded by: David Rivett
- Succeeded by: Fred White

Personal details
- Born: 12 September 1883 Thebarton, South Australia
- Died: 5 December 1949 (aged 66) South Australia, Australia
- Spouse: Lilian Lucas
- Education: Adelaide Agricultural School; Australian National University
- Occupation: Agricultural scientist

Arnold Edwin Victor Richardson CMG (12 September 1883 – 5 December 1949) was an Australian scientist noted for dry farming research, who became founding director of Waite Research Institute then director of the organisation now known as the CSIRO.

== History ==
Richardson was born in Thebarton, South Australia to George Edwin Richardson (c. 1848 – 25 July 1921) and his wife Louisa, née Mansfield (c. 1849 – 3 May 1911) of 4 George Street, Thebarton. George Edwin, who arrived in South Australia with his parents on the William Hyde in May 1849, was proprietor of Port Road Steam Works in 1881, and inventor of an improved brick-making machine. an improved direct-action stamp battery, and an automatic railway coupling, He was proprietor, 1886–1889 with Kempster, of "Manton Ironworks" on Manton Street, Hindmarsh. He later ran a foundry in Thebarton.

Arnold was educated at the Currie Street public school, then Adelaide Agricultural School, where he was dux for four terms, and was awarded the School's gold medal and a scholarship to Roseworthy Agricultural School, where he earned a first-class Diploma. In 1902 he returned to the Agricultural School to assist Andrew Ferguson, BSc in what proved to be the last year agricultural subjects were offered. He joined the Education Department as a student teacher to avail himself of free tuition at the University of Adelaide, where as what the Public Service Review called "one of the most talented students which the University of Adelaide has produced" he achieved his BA in 1907, BSc (Agric) in 1908 and MA in 1909. His thesis on "The milling qualities and chemical properties of flour from high and low grade wheats" won praise from Sydney University assessors. He was joint winner of the John Howard Clark Scholarship for English Literature in 1907. His teaching duties took him to Moonta Mines and Port Adelaide Public Schools, after which he joined the University Training College, where he was appointed assistant lecturer.

== Career ==
In 1908 Richardson accepted the position of Assistant Director of Agriculture, and was involved with the Director, Professor William Angus in research. In 1909 he took up residence at the Parafield Experimental Farm, where he was responsible for the breeding of several new varieties of wheat. He acted as Director of Agriculture for a few months in 1911 between the resignation of Angus and the appointment of Professor William Lowrie.

In June 1911 Richardson was appointed Agricultural Superintendent and Chief of the Division of Agriculture in Victoria. He established research stations at Werribee and Rutherglen, and did much to reverse farmers' antipathy to modern farming methods. From 1917 to 1919 he lectured part-time at the University of Melbourne, and was appointed Director of the School of Agriculture then when the Faculty of Agriculture was created, he was appointed inaugural Dean. In 1924 the University conferred on him the honour of Doctor of Science.

In 1924 he accepted the position of Waite Professor of Agriculture with the University of Adelaide and returned to South Australia to become the first Director of the Waite Agricultural Research Institute. He directed research into water and nitrogen requirements of different crops. He was Commonwealth delegate to the first Imperial Agricultural Research Conference in London in 1927, and in 1932 was one of the official advisers to the Australian delegation at the Imperial Economic Conference in Ottawa.

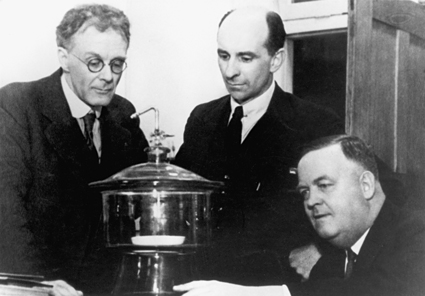
George Julius, Rivett, Richardson

In 1938, he was appointed Deputy chief executive officer for CSIR and in 1946 was promoted to chief executive officer, succeeding Sir David Rivett, who had been made chairman.

Responding to Federal (Liberal) Opposition claims of Communist influence and leakage of secrets from the CSIR, the Chifley Labor government, through the relevant Minister John Dedman, placed the CSIR under the control of a five-man Executive. Rivett refused to continue under this regime and in March 1949 resigned. Richardson followed, citing health reasons, quite plausible, as he died five months later. But Rivett's son Rohan Rivett was in no doubt both resignations were protests against Government interference in the functioning of the organisation, envisaged by its founder Stanley Bruce as truly independent of both Government and Public Service.

== Memberships ==
He was in 1923 President of section K (agriculture and forestry) of the Australasian Association for the Advancement of Science (now ANZAAS).

He was, from 1935 to 1936, the first president of the Australian Institute of Agricultural Science. (Prof. J.A. Prescott was the first president of the South Australian branch).

He was from 1947 to 1949 President of ANZAAS.

He was a member of the Adelaide Club and the Melbourne Club.

He was a member, and in 1949 President, of the Melbourne chapter of Rotary International.

== Family ==
He married Lilian Moonta Lucas (4 April 1879 – 30 June 1976) on 30 September 1909. Lilian, a noted concert singer, was also composer of a song which she presented to the Boy Scouts of America. They had one daughter, Yvonne Lilian Lucas Richardson (27 December 1911 – ), who married Lindsay Cust in Melbourne on 23 July 1940

== Recognition ==
- He was in 1938 invested as Companion of the Order of St Michael and St George (CMG)
- The A.E.V. Richardson Laboratory of the Waite Institute was named for him.
- A portrait, perhaps that by Septimus Power, hangs in the CSIRO building in East Melbourne. - Incorrect - Ricahrdson's portrait now hangs on Level one of the CSIRO Foundation Building at Black Mountain, Canberra. All major portraits were transferred up to Canberra when Head Office move to Canberra in 1972. These portraits remained within the Conference Room until the building was closed and the portraits were moved to Black Mountain. Rob birtles, CSIRO Archivist.
- Richardson Street in the Canberra suburb of Garran is named in his honour and also for Henry Handel Richardson.
