= Mary Matheson =

Australian psychologist (1896–1969)

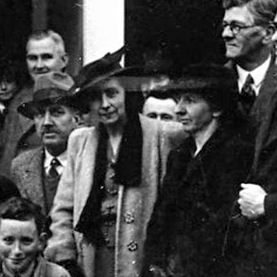
- one of these
- Born: Doris Mary Rivett; 4 December 1896; Beechworth
- Died: 15 January 1969 (aged 72); Castlecrag
- Other name: Mary Rivett
- Education: Fort Street Girls' High School, University of Sydney and Newnham women's college
- Known for: inspiring children and pioneering a free library service.
- Spouse: Thomas Matheson

(Doris) Mary Rivett became Mary Matheson (4 December 1896 – 15 January 1969) was an Australian psychologist who took an interest in faith healing, parapsychology and the education of children. She and her elder sister Elsie Rivett founded the Children's Library and Crafts Movement in 1934 which inspired children and pioneered a free library service.

== Life ==
Rivett was born in 1896 in Beechworth in the state of Victoria. She was the daughter of Elizabeth Mary Ann (born Cherbury) and the Rev. Albert Rivett, Her father was a Congregational minister and her elder siblings included Dr. Sir Albert Cherbury David Rivett, Dr. Edward William Rivett, School principal Eleanor Harriet "Nell" "Nellie" Rivett, librarian Elsie Grace Rivett, Dr. Olive Rivett (1889–1981) and Dr. Christine Rivett (28 February 1891 – 14 July 1962), Brisbane medical practitioner.

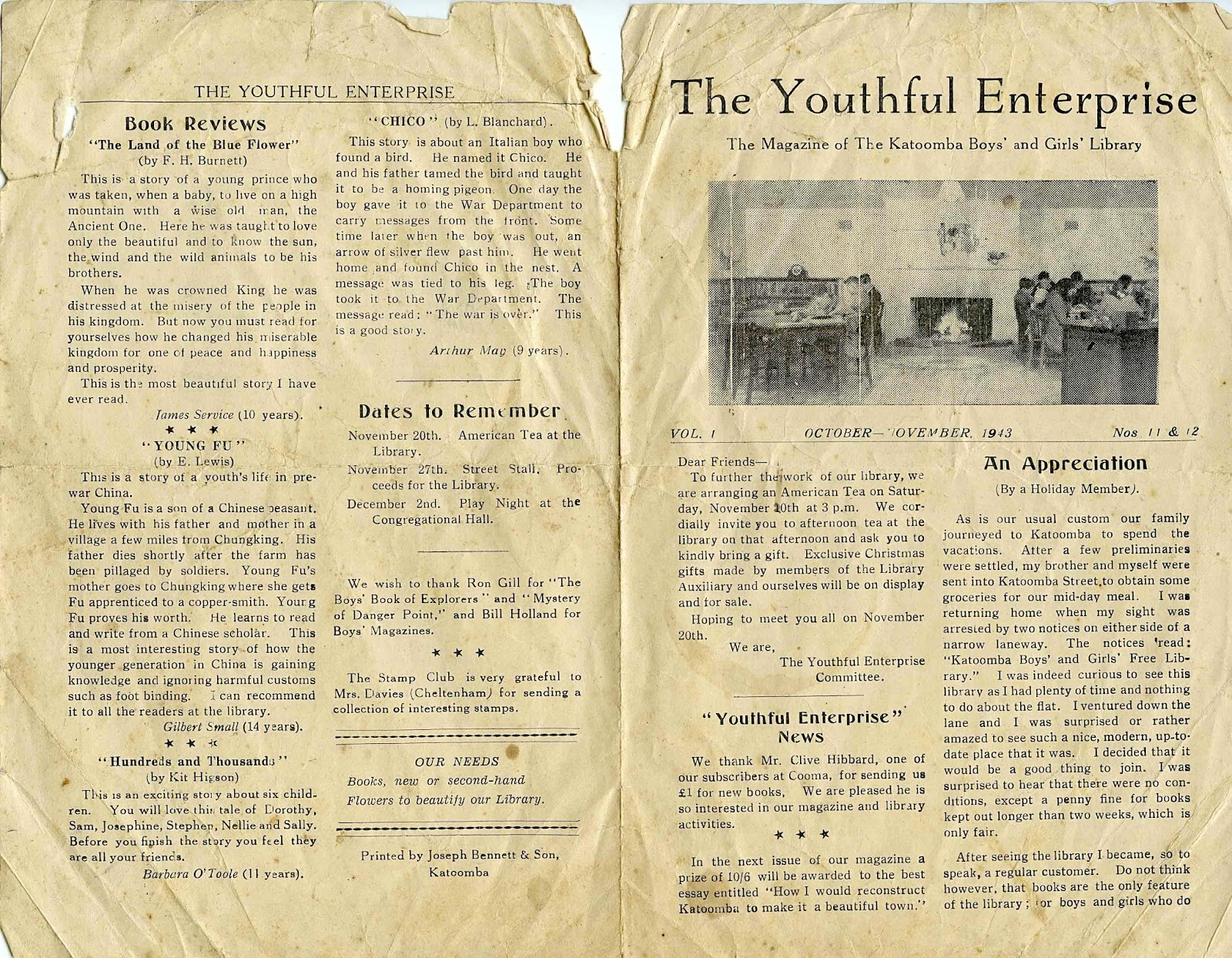
from Volume 1 of The Youthful Enterprise created by the Katoomba Boys and Girls Library in October 1943

She had a good education including Sydney's Fort Street Girls' High School. She had her first graduation in 1918 from the University of Sydney in philosophy. With her first class degree and the University medal in philosophy she left for England. She gained her second degree course this time in psychology at Newnham women's college in Cambridge. She worked as a lecturer at Bedford College to women students of the University of London. While she was in London she was impressed by the David Copperfield Library which had been created in the home that Charles Dickens lived in, as a boy.

In 1923 she was back at her alma mater employed as an extension lecturer until 1927. She also edited the Federal Independent newspaper for her father and she lectured at the Kindergarten Training College before it became the Sydney Kindergarten and Preparatory Teachers College.

She took an interest in telepathy, parapsychology and faith healing and she left her employment at her alma mater. She was intrigued by Victor Cromer's faith healing who was based at his Spiritual Healing Institute from 1920. She published Man and His Latent Powers and Vrillic Force in 1926.

Mary and Elsie ran and funded a children's library at Surry Hills active in 1933 based partly on the David Copperfield Library. The idea was to encourage children's imagination using after school activities and to supply a free library. In 1937 there was a similar facility at Phillip Park in East Sydney and in the following year it offered an open air theatre.

== 1934, Mary Matheson and the Carnegie report ==
In 1934 she became Mary Matheson – the second wife of Thomas Matheson and in 1934, Ralph Munn and Ernest Pitt, then Chief Librarian of the Public Library of Victoria, funded by the Carnegie Corporation of New York, conducted a survey of public libraries in Australia and New Zealand. Their conclusion was that free libraries should be created and funded by the tax payer. The sisters already had a free library but their renamed Children's Library and Crafts Movement was founded in 1934 by Mary and Elsie. The eighth branch was opened in Katoomba in 1942 with the mayor present. Edith Constance Murray organised the first use of puppets and in 1949 there were weekly shows at the Children's Theatre at Burnie Park, Clovelly. The theatre's work was supported by the sisters' Children's Library and Crafts Movement.

Mary remained as a secretary/organiser of the Children's Library and Crafts Movement until 1961. The movement lasted until 1969 when Matheson died and the organisation changed its name to the Creative Leisure Movement. The role of supplying libraries had been increasingly taken over by local councils and the remaining organisation looked at supplying arts and crafts activities.
