= Norman Hetherington =

Australian cartoonist (1921–2010)

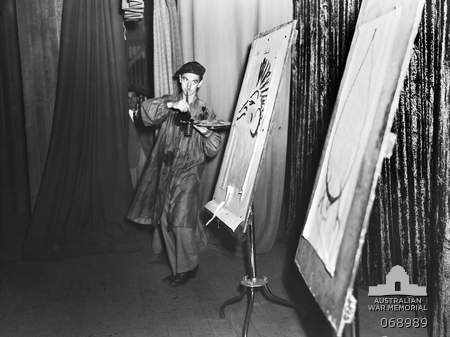
- Hetheringon on stage in 1944
- Born: Norman Frederick Hetherington; 29 May 1921 Lilyfield, New South Wales, Australia
- Died: 6 December 2010 (aged 89) Greenwich, New South Wales, Australia
- Notable works: Mr Squiggle
- Awards: Penguin Award; Jim Russell Award; Medal of the Order of Australia (OAM)
- Spouse: Peggy Owrid (née Margaret Purnell) (m. 1958)
- Children: 2

Norman Frederick Hetherington OAM (29 May 1921 – 6 December 2010) was an Australian artist, cartoonist (known as "Heth"), puppeteer, and puppet designer.

He is best remembered as the creator of one of Australia's longest running children's shows, Mr. Squiggle. Hetherington was the sole operator and voice of its star performer, the Mr. Squiggle marionette.

External images
- Advertisement: "Another 'Minties Moment'": cartoon: Giraffe eating hat: Sydney Morning Herald18 November 1946 page 7 Source: NLA Trove
- Norman Hetherington's self-portrait, and his earlier, horizontal-form "Heth" (1946) signature. Sydney Morning Herald, 18 November 1946 page 7 Source: NLA Trove
- Norman Hetherington's later (1950), vertical-form ("Chinese") "Heth" signature. Source: Foter.com
- Photograph of Norman Hetherington's original "Mr. SQUIGGLE" model. Source: National Archives of Australia
- Photograph of Norman Hetherington's original "Mr. SQUIGGLE" model, from the front, waving. Source: National Archives of Australia
- Photograph of Norman Hetherington's original "Mr. SQUIGGLE" model, from the side, waving. Source: National Archives of Australia
- Norman Hetherington's 1962 application to register the Copyright for the "Mr. SQUIGGLE" puppet. Source: National Archives of Australia
- Mr SQUIGGLE Costume, used at the "Journey of a Nation" Centenary of Federation parade, Sydney, Australia, 2000. Source: Powerhouse Museum

== Family ==
He was the son of Frederick Hetherington (1883–1951) and Ellen Mary Hetherington (1888–1976) (née Markwell). They were married at Balmain, New South Wales in 1918, and Norman Frederick Hetherington was born on 29 May 1921 in Lilyfield.

He grew up at 35 Meryla Street, Burwood. He did his primary schooling at Burwood Public School (1927–1933), and secondary schooling at Sydney's Fort Street Boys' High School (1934–1937). He studied art, full-time, at East Sydney Technical College (now known as the National Art School), from 1937 to 1938; and, because he had taken a position with one of Sydney's largest advertising agencies, Lintas (Lever International Advertising), he transferred to part-time studies, studying at night from 1939 to 1941 (when he enlisted in the army).

He married Margaret "Peggy" Owrid (née Purnell) (1923-2022) in 1958. She would later write scripts for episodes of Mr. Squiggle. They moved to the Sydney suburb of Mosman in 1960, and Hetherington remained there until his death.

The couple's children are Stephen (b.1959), an academic philosopher, and Rebecca (b.1962), a television presenter who also hosted Mr. Squiggle & Friends from 1989 until 1999.

== War service ==
He joined the CMF in 1941 and enlisted in the AIF in 1942. He was then transferred to the 2nd Division Concert Party – later called no. 4 Detachment, 1st Australian Army Entertainment Unit when his lightning sketch and performing abilities were recognised.

He service with the First Australian Army Entertainment Unit during World War II, took him to Dutch New Guinea, New Guinea, New Britain, and the Torres Strait Islands. The Entertainment Unit also included actor Michael Pate, and comedian George Wallace Jr.

== Cartoonist ==
He had attended classes at the National Art School before the war; and once the war was over, he continued his studies attending classes there four nights a week.

When he was only 16, and still a student at Fort Street Boys' High School, Hetherington sold his first cartoon to The Bulletin magazine. He continued to contribute to The Bulletin over the next few years and continued to do so whilst he was in the army.

As a freelance cartoonist he also sold work to magazines that included Man, Man Junior, Army, Humour and Quiz: "His modus operandi was to approach the best-paying magazine first and continue on until he got down to the worst paying with whatever was left of his work".

He was discharged from the army in May 1946, and was immediately asked to join the full-time Bulletin staff; he continued to work for The Bulletin until 1961 (when all of the staff were sacked by Frank Packer, its new owner). He worked alongside such artists as Norman Lindsay and Percy Lindsay.

=== Signature ===
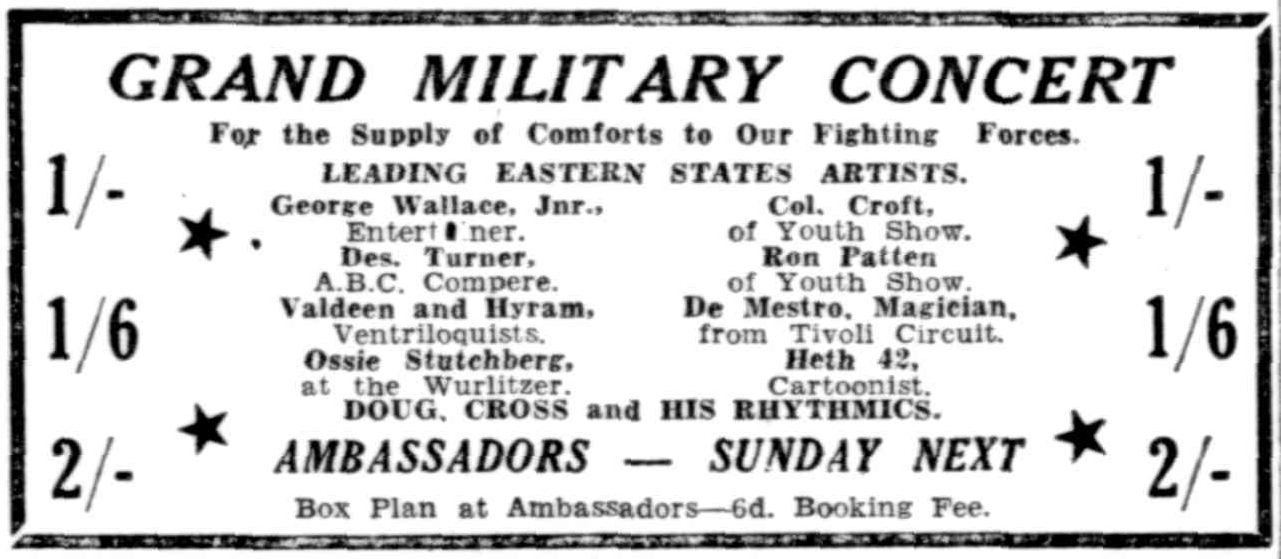
"Heth 42, Cartoonist", one of the stars at the Army Entertainment Unit concert for the "Penny-a-Plane" Appeal, Ambassadors Theatre , Perth, Sunday, 15 November 1942.

Early in his career, he signed his cartoons and caricatures with "Heth" and the last two digits of the year: a signature of, say, "Heth 42" (see advertisement at right) identifies Hetherington as the artist of the work, and 1942 as the year in which it had been drawn.

In the late 1940s, he changed his manner of signing his cartoons; it was no longer written horizontally, and it no longer displayed the year's last two digits. Whilst the signature "Heth" was still exclusively written in capital letters; it now took the form of "^{H}_{E}^{T}_{H}", rather than "HETH". The letters were now rotated sideways, and the signature was written vertically running down the page from the top-left to the bottom-right (see left); and was read with one's head tilted to the right.

Many of those who were not aware of this imagined he was signing his work with (non-rotated) imitations of a number of Chinese characters, traditionally written vertically, that needed to be read with one's head tilted to the left.

== Puppetry ==
=== Popular Science Monthly ===
His interest in marionettes began in 1935 when his father, who was the head carpenter for a major shipping line, gave him a copy of an American magazine called Popular Science Monthly, which contained instructions for making a puppet out of used bicycle inner tubes.

He first made this Clown puppet and used it in a 1950 Methodist Order of Knights production of 'The Reluctant Dragon', one of the many productions which he devised, wrote and designed for the Burwood Chapter of which he was a member.

He went on to use this Clown puppet which he called 'Tipsy' in his early professional puppet shows including his marionette version of 'The Reluctant Dragon at the Mercury Theatre in the St James Hall in Phillip St, Sydney in 1953.

He went on to develop a repertoire of puppet shows which he performed around Sydney including 'The Enchanted Scarecrow' and 'The Magic Tinderbox'.

Even in these first shows, critics were remarking on the "wit, whimsy, and lively inventiveness" of his performance with his marionettes, and were very impressed with the skill and craftsmanship with which his puppets had been created.

In a 1977 interview, Hetherington explained to Sue Molloy that his interest in marionettes "was the outcome of a professional interest in cartoons, and amateur interest in theatre and a hobby of puppets", remarking that, in his view, "puppets are only three-dimensional cartoons".

=== Clovelly Puppet Theatre ===
In 1952 he gained a little early experience working with marionettes under the direction of Edith Constance Murray (née Blackwell) (1897–1988), at the Clovelly Puppet Theatre, administered by the Children's Library and Crafts Movement which later became the Creative Leisure Movement. The puppet theatre was in a former army hut donated by Randwick Council and erected by local volunteers in 1948. Describing it as "a nurturing ground", Hetherington said that this was where and when his puppetry changed from being just a hobby into a lifelong interest.

At that time he joined the Puppetry Guild of NSW, of which Edith Murray was secretary for many years. The Guild usually met then in the Library and Crafts Movement's centre in Rochford Street, Erskineville, and in 1953 Norman impressed members with excellent marionettes of a contortionist and a dissecting skeleton.

In 1954 he did a marionette production of “The Magic Tinderbox” in which he made use of a technique used in a nineteenth century trick puppet, “The Grand Turk”, to transform the King; his legs became frogs, his arms owls and his body became a fat purple pig. The famous English glove-puppeteer and author, Walter Wilkinson (1888-1970) was guest at a performance in the puppet theatre at the Movement's centre at Bradfield Park, now East Lindfield.

When the Australian section of UNIMA (the international association of puppeteers) was formed in 1970, following groundwork done by Edith Murray, Hetherington was the obvious choice for President, while Murray was Secretary. Hetherington also went on to be President of UNIMA Australia (Union Internationale de la Marionnette, of the International Puppetry Association) for many years.

=== Meryla Marionettes ===
During the 1950s, whilst pursuing his own rapidly developing personal interest in puppetry, he created a number of shows with the group he led, the Meryla Puppet Group. He was soon working on his own, as The Meryla Marionettes, with a series of shows that were very popular with children.

In November 1957, he was performing on stage for children during Saturday matinees at Sydney cinemas; and performing at three different locations on the one afternoon. Along with Igor's Puppets, the Merlya Marionettes performed on stage at the children's matinees at The Coronet Cinema, Bondi Junction, The Sixways Cinema, at Bondi, and the Randwick Cinema, at Randwick, on Saturday 23 November 1957; and at The Bondi Road Cinema, at Bondi, The Sixways Cinema, at Bondi, and The Woollahra Cinema, at Woollahra on Saturday 30 November 1957. Hetherington (assisted by Annette MacArthur-Onslow) and his puppets also performed live, on television, on Christmas Day 1957.

In the beginning, the shows were often performed at children's libraries. Hetherington was always keen to demonstrate to his young audiences just how easily puppets could be made.

He continued to develop and perform puppet shows for holiday performances in theatres and department stores such as Anthony Hordern & Sons, David Jones, Farmer's, Grace Bros and Myer throughout the 50's, 60's, 70's and 80's including shows such as such as "Enchanted Scarecrow", "The Magic Tinderbox", "The Moon for Supper" and "Nicky's Christmas Snowman". and "St George and the Dragon". In later years he was assisted by his daughter Rebecca.

Parents Guide to Holiday Fun

The old-fashioned world of puppets has come back to store windows in the city with the appearance of A Christmas Carol a Myer in George Street. Its on all the coming week.

Norman Hetherington has made 13 different puppets and half a dozen shadow puppets with the help of his family.

— The Sun-Herald (18 December 1977).

=== Puppet Designer ===
His innovative and creative design and construction skills were such that, from time to time, he was also asked to design puppets for others to operate in their own shows.

The photograph of "Smiley" on the front page of The Sydney Morning Herald of Tuesday 2 June 1970, provides a sense of how skilled Hetherington was in designing and constructing puppets due to the intricate nature of the mechanical devices and the sets that he designed for his shows.

For the Marionette Theatre of Australia he designed the rod-puppets used in The Mysterious Potamus (1979), The Wind in the Willows (1986) and Pinnochio (1987). (The first was performed in the Drama Theatre of the Sydney Opera House and travelled to Japan and The Philippines.)

== Television ==
Having attended the Australian Broadcasting Corporation's (ABC) television training school some time prior to the introduction of television to Australia, Hetherington began his television career in 1956, creating Nicky and Noodle for the ABC, and another series, Jolly Gene and His Fun Machine for Channel Seven in 1957.

== Mr. Squiggle ==
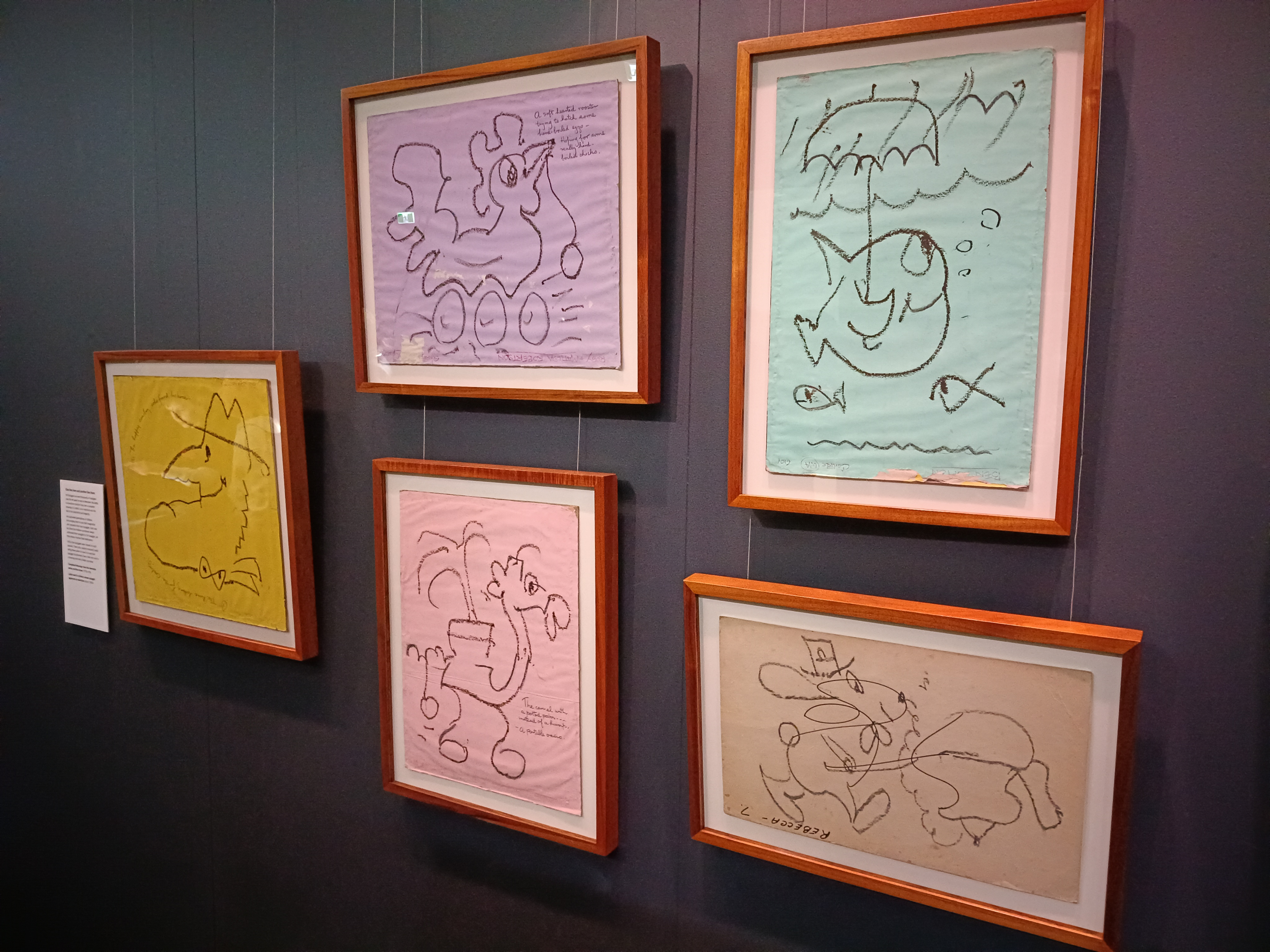
Mr Squiggle drawings created on the program using an upside-down drawing technique, displayed at Newcastle Museum in 2026.

In 1958, Hetherington created Mr. Squiggle, a moon-dwelling marionette with a pencil for a nose, and the character first appeared on the Children's TV Club on ABC TV, as Mister Jolly Squiggle by "Heth". Hetherington was granted the copyright (No. 8027) for Mr. Squiggle in 1962; and his application stated that he had first created "Mr. Squiggle" on 1 August 1958. The marionette had a very heavy head, and it was always manipulated by and voiced by Hetherington himself as the sole operator. Since the images were drawn upside down, Hetherington would lie above the set in the rafters above looking down at the drawing whilst operating the marionette. The gentle politeness of Mr. Squiggle, and the gentle strength of Hetherington's well-modulated voice was immediately attractive to children, at a time when most of the other Australian TV channels had violent, raucous, and brash ventriloquist acts associated with their children's shows.

Exploiting the "fusion" of his skills as both puppeteer and cartoonist, he used the tip of the pencil that formed the puppet's nose to convert "squiggles" that had been sent in to the television station by young viewers into full-realised drawings and cartoons. Most significantly, given all of the mechanics of his marionette's performance, all of these "squiggle" conversions by Mr. Squiggle were always performed with the original children's drawing up-side down.

When asked, in 2009, in one of the "Moment in Time" segments of the ABC TV programme Can We Help?, on behalf of a viewer, Miriam Webster, whether Mr. Squiggle had lead in his pencil or whether it was "something more extraterrestrial", Norman Hetherington replied: "It started off with a very large felt pen, a very thick felt pen; but, in Studio 23, we were very close to the lights, and the heat would dry up the felt, and it wasn't very good, so we graduated to crayon, and then to oil chalk, and then [to] chalk."

Initially intended as a temporary fill-in, the show ran on ABC for 40 years, Mr. Squiggle's first appearance on ABC TV was on 1 July 1959, and he drew his last picture on ABC TV on 9 July 1999.

Mr. Squiggle was joined by other characters devised and performed by Hetherington including Rocket who brought him from the Moon to the studio; Blackboard who held the squiggles while Mr Squiggle transformed them; Bill Steamshovel who loved telling riddles and eating rocks and concrete and later the knock-knock telling Gus the Snail.

Over the 40 years on ABC television, Mr Squiggle also had a number of helpers who 'held his hand' to help him tackle the tricky squiggles the viewers would send in. These included Miss Gina from 1959 - 1960 (Gina Curtis), Miss Pat from 1960 - 1975 (Pat Lovell), Miss Sue (Sue Lloyd), Miss Jane from 1975 until 1986 (Jane Fennell), Roxanne Kimmorley for the next three years and then Norman's daughter Rebecca Hetherington from 1989 until the show ended in 1999.

When interviewed by Sarah Collerton in 2009, Hetherington told her that "I taught Mr. Squiggle to draw and now he draws better than I do".

In May 1999, Mr. Squiggle was honoured by Australia Post with his own 45-cent postage stamp.

In 2019, the Australian Mint issued a Mr. Squiggle and Friends Coin Collection celebrating the 60th Anniversary of Mr. Squiggle. It featured a limited edition 1 cent coin, two 1$ coins featuring images of Mr Squiggle and four 2$ coins each with coloured embellishment and featuring Mr. Squiggle as well as the other characters from the show, Bill Steamshovel, Gus the Snail and Blackboard, all enclosed in an illustrated folder featuring illustrations of Mr. Squiggle and Friends by Norman Hetherington.

== Smiley's Good Teeth Puppet Theatre ==
In March 1962, the Dental Health Education and Research Foundation was established at the University of Sydney to promote the philosophy and practice of preventive dentistry and, in particular, communicate positive dental health messages to the general population. Preliminary studies had convinced the Foundation that "dental health literature of a hand-out nature was virtually useless unless it was used to supplement information or knowledge already passed on to the recipient by a dentist or some other authoritative person". Moreover, it was soon found that the presence of Dental Health Educators in primary schools, instructing children up to 12 years in such things as diet, oral hygiene and plaque control, was not as effective as anticipated.

In 1967, Hetherington was consulted by the Foundation; and, with the initial notion of strongly augmenting the work of the Dental Health Educators, he was responsible for establishing the "Smiley's Good Teeth Puppet Theatre", starring a new puppet, Smiley ("a little boy who gets toothache because he has not looked after his teeth properly"), that delivered performances based on a script that had been produced in collaboration with the Foundation, that featured all of its desired preventive dentistry messages. The first performance—which, it had been decided by that time, would run "in parallel with" (rather than "as part of") the dental health educator programme—was in February 1968, with the specific target of the younger, primary school children.

The shows were performed with two puppeteers, with the assistant operating Smiley, and Hetherington everything else. The show, and its associated Good Teeth Club—to which Hetherington, having emerged from behind the puppet stage, would invite the delighted children to join at the end of each of his performances (Anon, 1970)—was immensely popular with the school children immediately it began its operation.

The Foundation was overjoyed to discover that evaluations showed that, even after six months, the children could remember 70% of the dental health messages associated with the show (Woolley, 1980).

In 1970, as part of a weekend workshop conducted by the Australian Dental Association and the Dental Health Education and Research Foundation at Sydney University, Hetherington demonstrated his work to the assembled dentists, by allowing them to observe him deliver an entire performance to a group of children from Newtown North Primary School. They were all greatly impressed with his work.

Smiley's Good Teeth Puppet Theatre operated from 1968 to 1985, and, although it began in suburban Sydney, it was making trips into the country by late 1969.

As time passed, Hetherington became less involved in the actual delivery of the performances and often hired other puppeteers to perform the shows including Pam Sahm, who operated Smiley.

== Javanese Puppet Theatre ==
Given his wide range of appropriate skills and experience, Hetherington was invited to work with a group of undergraduate students (ranging from second to fourth year) from the (then) Department of Indonesian and Malayan Studies at the University of Sydney, over the entire three-term year of 1980, in the task of preparing them for a performance of "Irawan Rabi", or "Irwan's Wedding", as it had been adapted for a western audience by James R. Brandon, in the manner of the traditional Javanese puppet theatre (or wayang kulit). (Day, 1981).

He was asked to assist them to acquire an understanding of shadow puppet design, train them in the appropriate techniques of puppet manipulation, guide them into a smooth performance, as well as transferring an understanding of puppetry stagecraft (Day, 1981).

Apart from the extensive training he delivered to the students, and the advice that he gave to the entire company on puppetry stagecraft, he was also a very important participant in the joint construction of the final script, the musical improvisations used during the performance, and the comic routines that were woven throughout the entire performance. (Day, 1981.)

The eventual performance, the culmination of the entire year's project/course, was performed by six of the students, along with "eight-metre-high puppets made from plywood", a "life-size monster with expendable heads" and a "foam-rubber monkey".

== Awards ==
Hetherington and his wife received several honours and awards, including the Penguin Award in 1984, and again in 1989, from the Television Society of Australia "for their outstanding contribution to children's television in Australia".

He was awarded a Medal of the Order of Australia in 1990 "for service to children's television programmes and puppetry".

In 2005, he was presented with the Dean's Award for Excellence in Art, Design and Education (College of Fine Arts, UNSW), for contribution to the media. In 1989 the Australian Cartoonists' Association presented Hetherington with a signed artist's smock; it awarded him a life membership in 2008; and [on 14 November 2009] the association presented him with the coveted Jim Russell Award for his outstanding contribution to Australian cartooning at the Stanley Awards ceremony in Sydney. He received a standing ovation at the presentation where many fellow cartoonists acknowledged that they were encouraged to pick up a pencil by virtue of being able to watch Mr. Squiggle's antics on television each week.

== Death ==
After a long illness, Hetherington died on 6 December 2010 in Greenwich, Sydney. At his funeral, the eulogy was delivered by Richard Bradshaw. and his daughter Rebecca Hetherington.

== Tributes ==
Many artists, cartoonists, and puppeteers have acknowledged their debt to Norman Hetherington and his work, including:

- Christine Assange, Australian puppeteer and mother of Julian Assange.
- Peter Broelman, Australian editorial cartoonist, caricaturist and illustrator.
- Chris "Roy" Taylor, Herald-Sun cartoonist.
- Annette MacArthur-Onslow, author, illustrator of children's books, and one-time assistant to Hetherington (e.g., on Christmas Day 1957).
- Ross McCaughey, Australian cartoonist and book illustrator.
- Spare Parts Puppet Theatre.
- Hilary Talbot, Australian puppeteer and puppet designer.
- Ben Wood, Australian book and magazine illustrator.

=== Sophie Diao's Google Doodle ===
In 2014, Google paid tribute to Hetherington, on what would've been his 93rd birthday, with a Google Doodle, that had been created by the Google Doodle artist Sophie Diao.

== Historical collection ==
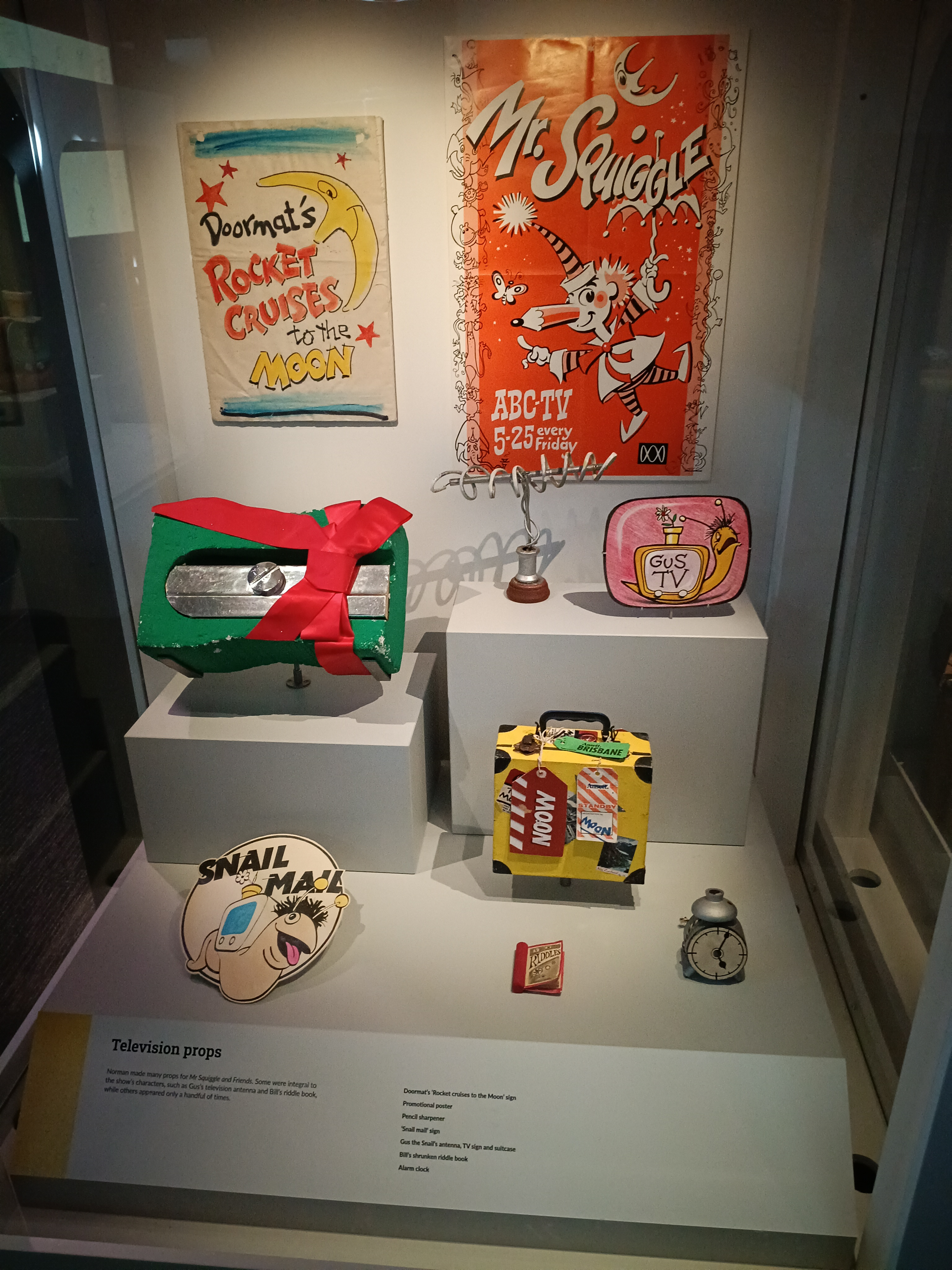
Television props from Mr Squiggle, displayed at Newcastle Museum in 2026.

In April 2024, the National Museum of Australia announced that it had acquired a collection of Norman Hetherington's puppets, scripts, artworks, props, graphics, merchandise, and fans' "squiggles", with the intention of eventually putting them on display.

"It’s Squiggle time at the National Museum of Australia" - Press release. The exhibition "Mr Squiggle and Friends: The Creative World of Norman Hetherington" was displayed from 4 July to 13 October 2025. In 2026, the collection was exhibited at Newcastle Museum.

== Hetherington's works ==
=== Author ===
- "Heth", Army Daze by Heth: From Civvy to Commando in 40 Easy Laughs, Pinnacle Press (Magpie Series), (Sydney), 1945.
- Hetherington, N., Puppets of Australia, Australian Council for the Arts, (Sydney), 1974.
- Hetherington, N. & Hetherington, M., Mr. Squiggle and the Great Moon Robbery, Australian Broadcasting Commission, (Sydney), 1980.
- Hetherington, N. & Hetherington, M., Hand Shadows, Angus & Robertson, (North Ryde), 1988.
- Hetherington, N. & Hetherington, M., Mr. Squiggle and the Preposterous Purple Crocodile, ABC Enterprises, (Sydney), 1992.

=== Illustrator ===
- Blair, D. (ed.), Blown to Blazes and Other Works of J. B. Blair, David Blair, (Sydney), 2007.
- Gardiner, S., Reflections, Wentworth Books, (Surry Hills), 1979.
- Hetherington, M., Mr. Squiggle and the Preposterous Purple Crocodile, ABC Enterprises, (Sydney), 1992.
- Hosking, C., Old Tales in a New Land: Some European Customs and Legends, Angus and Robertson, (Sydney), 1957.
- Pate, M., An Entertaining War, Dreamweaver Books, (Sydney), 1986.

Norman Hetherington was an avid supporter of the Book Collectors Society of Australia. In his memory, one of his cartoons appears on the back cover of the society journal Biblionews.
