= Eleanor Harriett (Nell) Rivett =

Australian missionary (1883–1972)

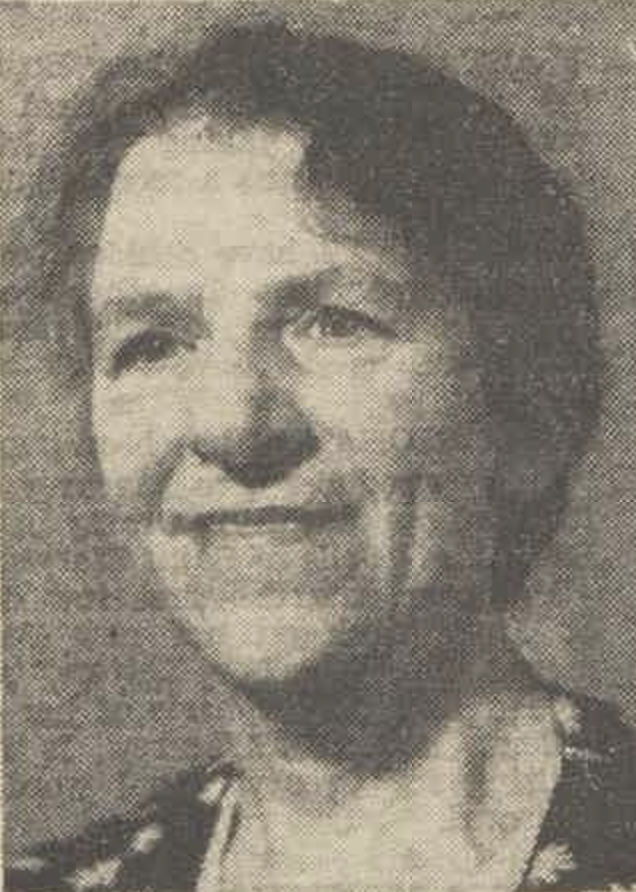
- Eleanor Harriett (Nell) Rivett in 1944
- Born: 27 September 1883; Dover, Tasmania, Australia
- Died: 21 May 1972 (aged 88); Sydney, New South Wales, Australia
- Organization: London Missionary Society
- Father: Albert Rivett
- Relatives: Mary Matheson (sister), Christine Rivett (sister)

Eleanor Harriett (Nell) Rivett (27 September 1883 – 21 May 1972) was an Australian missionary, known for her work with women's education in India.

== Early life and family ==
Rivett was born on 27 September 1883 in Dover, Tasmania. Eleanor was the daughter of Elizabeth Mary Ann (née Cherbury) and Reverend Albert Rivett, a Congregational pastor and pacifist. Eleanor's sisters included psychologist Mary Matheson, medical practitioner and birth control advocate Christine Rivett, and library advocate Elsie Rivett.

After being educated in Melbourne, Rivett traveled to Calcutta with the London Missionary Society in 1907.

== Missionary work ==
In India she held a number of leadership roles in the area of women's education, including principal of the United Missionary Girls' High School, secretary of the Bengal Women's Education League, secretary of the Bengal Advisory Board on Women's Education, and principal of Women's Christian College.

== Later life ==
Rivett died in Sydney, New South Wales, Australia, on 21 May 1972.
