= List of mayors of Derby =

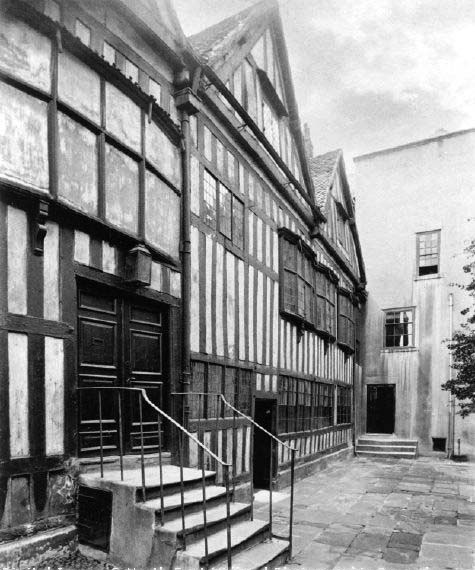
A building known as the "Mayor's Parlour" in 1860 (demolished in the 1940s).

The first Mayor for the Borough of Derby was chosen on 3 July 1638 by the king's charter then granted to the town. The two last bailiffs were the two first mayors, Henry Mellor being proclaimed 3 July 1638 to be the mayor until Michaelmas and twelve months after; he died on 5 February 1639 and John Hope served the year out.

The chief duties of the mayor are to chair Derby Council meetings and to attend the city's remembrance event, however the ceremonial duties can be considerable. In 2013 the cost of running the office was thought to be over £100,000. Derby's mayor wears a ceremonial chain that has been valued at over £1,000,000. The chain was originally worn by Chief Judges of the King's Bench. It was obtained for Derby's mayor to wear in 1850.

== 17th century ==
- 1638 Henry Mellor, died 5 February 1639. Mr Hope succeeded him and served the year out
- 1639 John Hope
- 1640 Edward Large
- 1641 Luke Whittington
- 1642 Henry Wandell
- 1643 Luke Whittington
- 1644 Luke Whittington
- 1645 Gervase Bennet
- 1646 John Dalton
- 1647 Robert Mellor
- 1648 Thomas Sleigh
- 1649 Edward Large
- 1650 John Parker
- 1651 William Willot
- 1652 John Dalton
- 1653 Thomas Youle
- 1654 Humphry Yates
- 1655 Thomas Sleigh
- 1656 Gilbert Ward
- 1657 Nathaniel Hallowes
- 1658 Edward Large He died and John Parker served the year out
- 1659 John Gisborne
- 1660 John Dunnidge
- 1661 Thomas Potter
- 1662 John Brookhouse
- 1663 Edward Walker
- 1664 Robert Wandel
- 1665 John Harryman
- 1666 Hugh Newton
- 1667 Samuel Spateman
- 1668 John Dalton
- 1669 Humphry Yates
- 1670 James Ward
- 1671 John Spateman He died in the year and Roger Newton served it out
- 1672 Roger Newton
- 1673 Thomas Goodwin
- 1674 George Blackwell
- 1675 Edward Walker
- 1676 Samuel Spateman
- 1677 John Brookhouse
- 1678 Robert Wandel
- 1679 Roger Newton
- 1680 John Lord
- 1681 Edward Walker
- 1682 Roger Newton
- 1683 Thomas Goodwin
- 1684 John Dunnidge
- 1685 Joseph Worden
- 1686 Solomon Roberte
- 1687 Leonard Sad displaced 11 Jan by King James II and Helph Brough appointed
- 1688 John Cheshire
- 1689 Samuel Spateman
- 1690 Samuel Cheshire
- 1691 Samuel Fletcher
- 1692 John Lord
- 1693 Thomas Goodwin
- 1694 Henry Holmes
- 1695 Henry Noton
- 1696 Solomon Roberts
- 1697 William Franceys
- 1698 Thomas Goodwin He died 26 August and Thomas Carter served the year out
- 1699 William Franceys

== 18th century ==
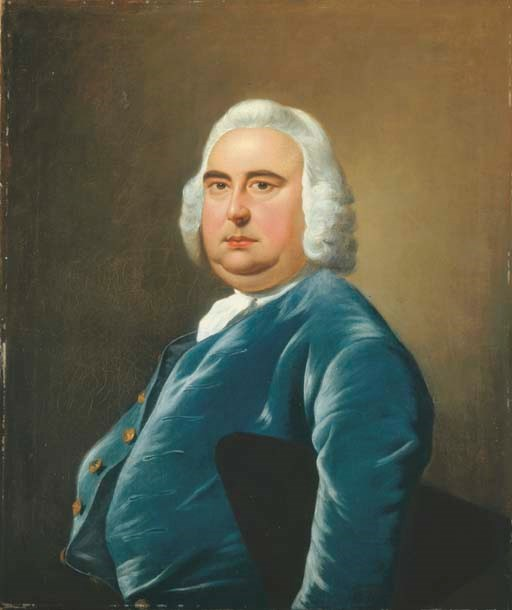
John Heath of Derby (d.1815) (Joseph Wright of Derby, 1760)

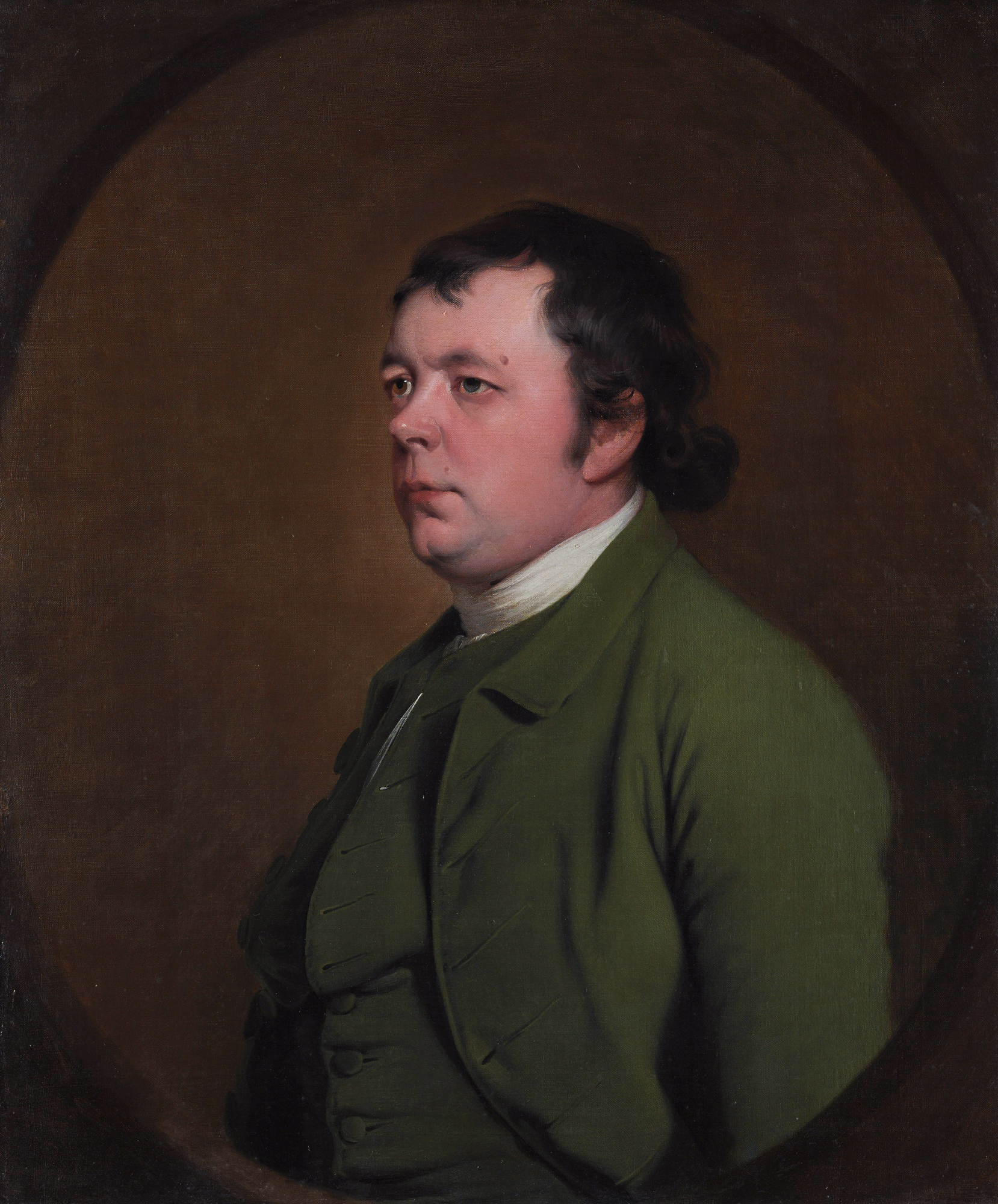
John Hope (d. 1819) (Joseph Wright of Derby, ca. 1780)

- 1700 William Franceys
- 1701 Thomas Carter
- 1702 Joseph Bloodworth
- 1703 Francis Cockayne
- 1704 William Turner
- 1705 Thomas Bott
- 1706 Joseph Broughton
- 1707 Thomas Byram
- 1708 John Holmes
- 1709 Thomas Fisher
- 1710 Richard Ward
- 1711 Francis Cockayne
- 1712 Thomas Gisborne
- 1713 Joseph Broughton
- 1714 Thomas Fisher
- 1715 Thomas Rivett
- 1716 John Bagnold Thomas
- 1717 Thomas Geary
- 1718 John Holmes
- 1719 Richard Ward
- 1720 Hugh Bateman
- 1721 Francis Cockayne
- 1722 William Woolley
- 1723 Philip Parr
- 1724 Thomas Gisborne
- 1725 Samuel Cooper
- 1726 John Bagnold
- 1727 Thomas Houghton
- 1728 Robert Wagstaffe
- 1729 John Gisborne
- 1730 Isaac Borrow
- 1731 Nathaniel Edwards
- 1732 John Holmes
- 1733 Francis Cockayne
- 1734 Thomas Gisborne
- 1735 Samuel Cooper
- 1736 John Bagnold
- 1737 John Gisborne
- 1738 Robert Wagstaffe
- 1739 Robert Bakewell
- 1740 Joshua Smith
- 1741 Samuel Fox
- 1742 Isaac Borrow
- 1743 Thomas Gisborne
- 1744 Samuel Cooper
- 1745 Robert Hague
- 1746 Humphrey Booth
- 1747 Henry Franceys He died 1 January and Humphrey Booth served the year out
- 1748 Matthew Howe
- 1749 Thomas Gisborne
- 1750 Joseph Bingham
- 1751 Robert Bakewell
- 1752 Humphrey Booth
- 1753 Matthew Howe
- 1754 Robert Bakewell
- 1755 William Evans
- 1756 Robert Bakewell
- 1757 John Bingham
- 1758 Samuel Crompton
- 1759 Robert Bakewell
- 1760 Joseph Bingham
- 1761 Thomas Rivett
- 1762 Thomas Milnes He died on 19 October and Joshua Smith served the year out
- 1763 John Heath
- 1764 Samuel Wilde
- 1765 William Evans
- 1766 Samuel Wilde
- 1767 Samuel Crompton
- 1761 William Evans
- 1769 Thomas Stamford
- 1770 Henry Flint
- 1771 Thomas Eaton
- 1772 John Heath
- 1773 William Edwards
- 1774 Christopher Heath
- 1775 Robert Hope
- 1776 William Leaper
- 1777 Robert Hope He died and Samuel Crompton served the year out
- 1778 Francis Ashby
- 1779 Matthew Howe
- 1780 William Edwards
- 1781 John Hope
- 1782 Samuel Crompton
- 1783 Thomas Mather
- 1784 Francis Ashby
- 1785 William Edwards
- 1786 Henry Flint
- 1787 John Hope
- 1788 Samuel Crompton
- 1789 Thomas Mather
- 1790 Francis Ashby
- 1791 Thomas Lowe
- 1792 John Crompton
- 1793 William Snowden
- 1794 Richard Leaper
- 1795 John Hope
- 1796 John Leaper Newton
- 1797 Rev Charles Stead Hope
- 1798 William Edwards
- 1799 Henry Browne

== 19th century ==
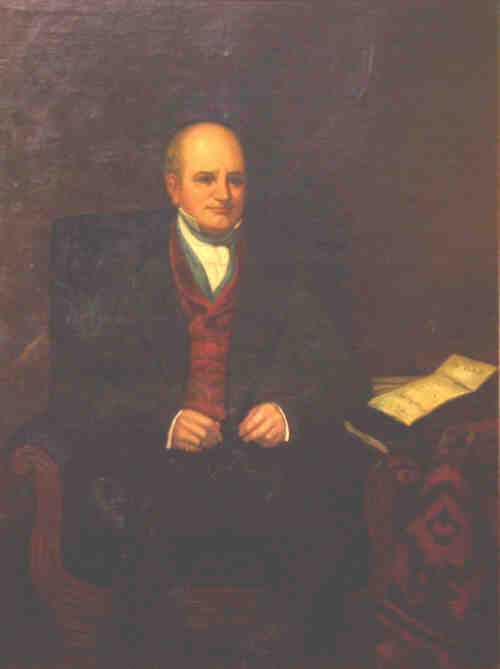
Joseph Strutt, from a portrait that was in the Mayoral Gallery at the Derby Council House

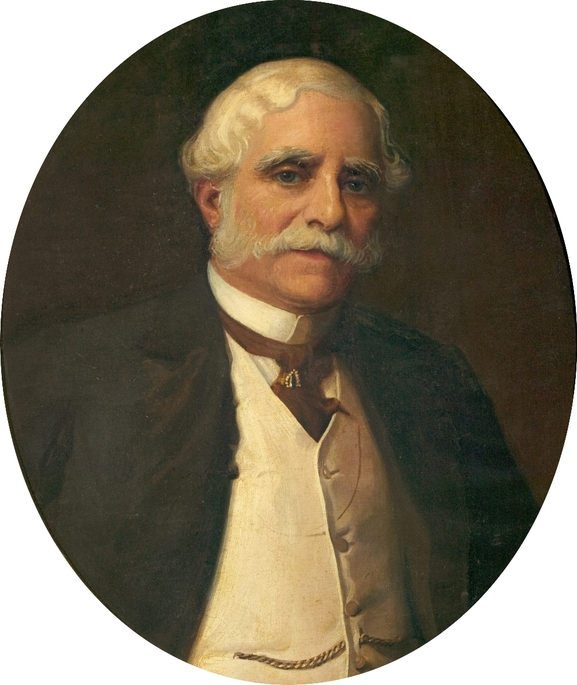
Sir Henry Howe Bemrose by Ernest Townsend

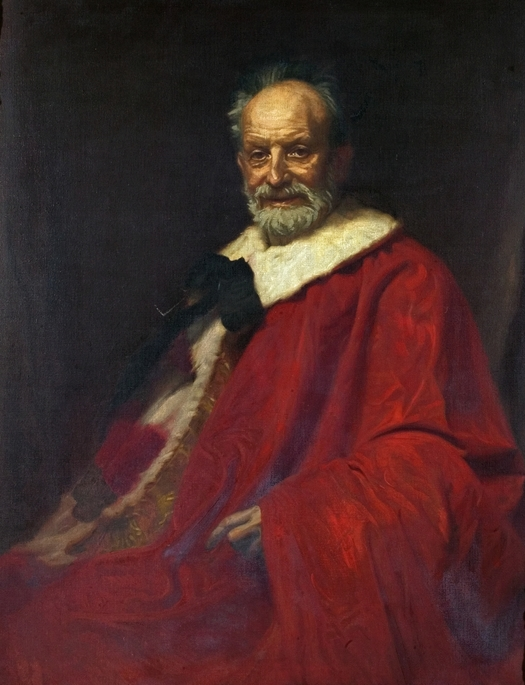
"The Late Lord Roe" by Ernest Townsend

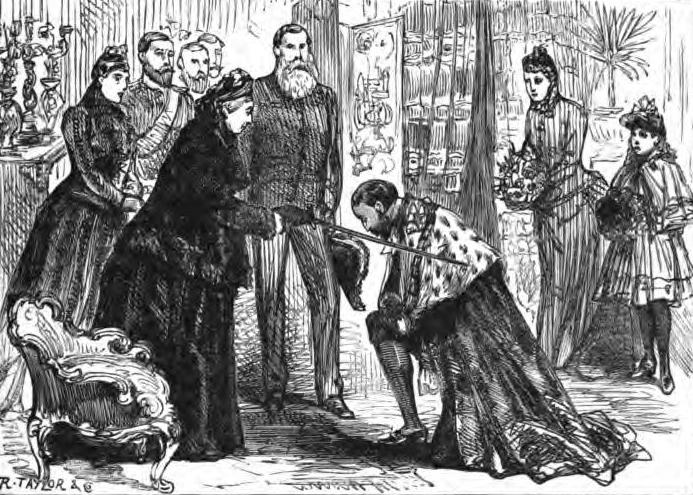
Haslam being knighted whilst mayor in 1890

- 1800 John Crompton
- 1801 Samuel Rowland
- 1802 Thomas Lowe
- 1803 William Snowden
- 1804 John Hope
- 1806 Rev Charles Stead Hope
- 1806 John Drewry
- 1807 Richard Leaper
- 1808 Henry Browne
- 1809 Samuel Rowland
- 1810 John Crompton
- 1811 Thomas Haden
- 1812 Henry Lowe
- 1813 Thomas Lowe
- 1814 John Drewry
- 1815 Richard Leaper
- 1816 Rev Charles Stead Hope
- 1817 John Crompton
- 1818 Samuel Rowland Bryan
- 1819 Thomas Haden
- 1820 James Oakes
- 1821 Henry Lowe
- 1822 Thomas Lowe
- 1823 John Drewry
- 1824 Richard Leaper
- 1825 Rev Charles Stead Hope
- 1826 John Crompton
- 1827 Samuel Rowland
- 1828 John Bell Crompton
- 1829 William Leaper Newton
- 1830 Rev Charles Stead Hope
- 1831 Charles Matthew Lowe
- 1832 John Chatterton
- 1833 Douglas Fox
- 1834 Richard Wright Haden
- 1835 Joseph Strutt
- 1836 William Leaper Newton
- 1837 John Bell Crompton
- 1838 Douglas Fox
- 1839 John Sandars
- 1840 Francis Jessopp
- 1841 Stephen Gamble
- 1842 John Bell Crompton
- 1843 John Barber
- 1844 John Moss
- 1845 William Eaton Mousley
- 1846 William Eaton Mousley
- 1847
- 1848 Robert Forman
- 1849 James Haywood
- 1850 Douglas Fox
- 1851 J. G. Crompton
- 1852
- 1853 T. Madeley
- 1854 William Goodwin
- 1855 Robert Pegg
- 1856 Henry Franceys Gisborne
- 1857 J.G. Crompton
- 1858 John Gadsby
- 1859 W. T. Cox
- 1860 W. T. Cox
- 1861 Henry Darby
- 1862 Thomas Clarke
- 1863 S. Webster/Thomas Roe
- 1864 Thomas Roe
- 1865 Frederick Longden
- 1866 John Renals
- 1867 T. Roe Jnr
- 1868 Sir Thomas William Evans
- 1869 Robert Forman
- 1870 Samuel W. Cox
- 1871 Samuel Leech
- 1872 Sir John Smith
- 1873 G. Wheeldon
- 1874 George Holme Snr
- 1875 John Turner
- 1876 W Higginbottom
- 1877 Sir Henry Howe Bemrose
- 1878 W. J. Smith
- 1879 William Sowter
- 1880 Sir Abraham Woodiwiss
- 1881 Sir Abraham Woodiwiss
- 1882 Robert Russell
- 1883 William Hobson (twice mayor )
- 1884 Henry Fowkes (died in office and replaced by William Hobson)
- 1885 Charles Leech
- 1886 Samuel Whitaker
- 1887 James William Newbold
- 1888 Sir Abraham Woodiwiss jnr
- 1889 William Heathcote
- 1890 Sir Alfred Seale Haslam
- 1891 T. H. Harrison
- 1892 William H. Marsden
- 1893 James Patrick Doherty
- 1894 George Bottomley
- 1895 Henry Boam
- 1896 Sir Thomas Roe
- 1897 Duesbury
- 1898 Sir Edwin Thomas Ann
- 1899 T. Fletcher

== 20th century ==
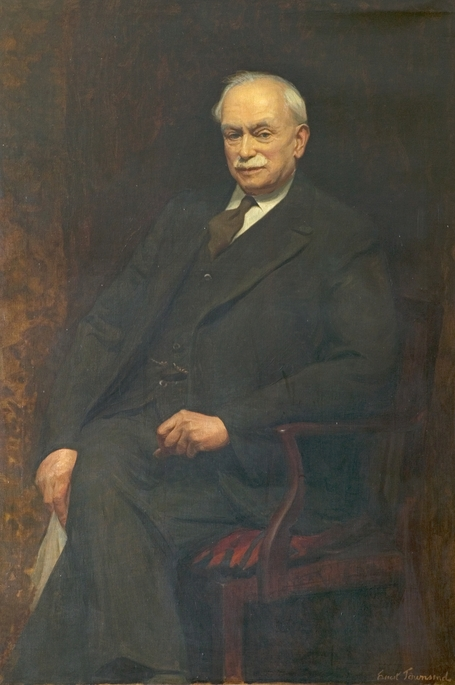
William Robert Raynes by Ernest Townsend

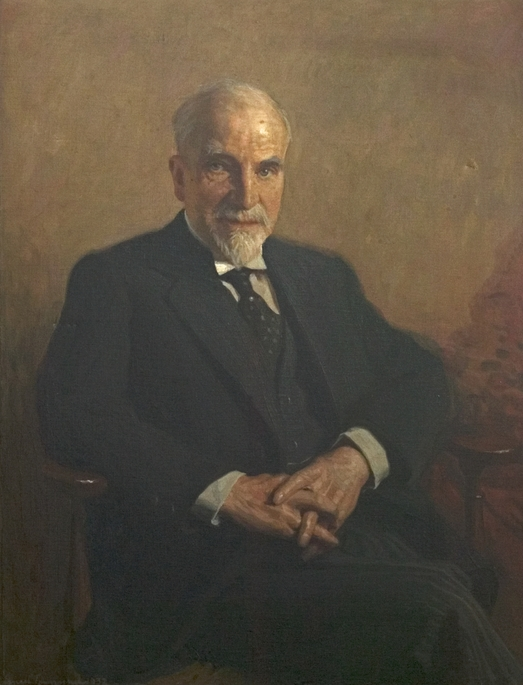
Sir John Ferguson Bell, Mayor of Derby by Ernest Townsend

- 1900–01 Edgar Home
- 1901–02 Abraham Woodiwiss jnr
- 1902–03 Frederick Strutt (Liberal)
- 1903-04 Cornelius Boam
- 1904–05 W. Hart
- 1905–06 J P Doherty
- 1906–07 Sir Edwin Thomas Ann
- 1907–08 Arthur Simpson (1851–1917)
- 1908–09 R B Chamber
- 1909–10 William Blews Robotham
- 1910–11 Dr H Arnold Bemrose (Conservative)
- 1911–12 George Brigden (1842–1928)
- 1912–13 Sir Thomas Roe
- 1913–14 W. G. Wilkins (Liberal)
- 1914–15 Samuel Johnson
- 1915–16 Albert Green
- 1916–17 H. J. Bonas
- 1917–18 Edward James Hulse
- 1918–19 William Blews Robotham
- 1919–20 A. J. Eggleston
- 1920–21 Dr Robert Laurie (Liberal)
- 1921–22 William Robert Raynes (Labour)
- 1922–23 Oswald Ling (Conservative)
- 1923–24 Fred H Porter (Liberal)
- 1924–25 Alan Mycroft (Labour)
- 1925–26 Samuel Collis (Conservative)
- 1926–27 Arthur H. Domleo
- 1927–28 Arthur Sturgess
- 1928–29 S. Johnson
- 1929–30 J H H Grant (died in office 1930)
- 1930 Sir John Ferguson Bell
- 1930–31 William Harold Hoare
- 1931–32 W H Salisbury (Labour)
- 1932–33 A E Moult (Conservative)
- 1933–34 H Slaney (Labour)
- 1934–35 Bertram Samuel Thorpe (1879–1946) (Conservative)
- 1935–36 John Clark
- 1936–37 Mrs Elizabeth Petty (Conservative)
- 1937–38 Edward Ernest Paulson (Labour)
- 1938–39 David S Butler(Conservative)
- 1939–40 Arthur Thomas Neal
- 1940–41 J. Pinchbeck
- 1941–42 H. G. Pattison
- 1942–43 Herbert A Hind
- 1943–44 Ernest Arthur Armstrong
- 1944–45 W. H. Philips
- 1945–46 T. Johnson
- 1946–47 C. R. Bates
- 1947–48 George Frederick Warburton
- 1948–49 Arthur Thomas Neal
- 1949–50 Charles F. Bowmer
- 1950–51 Matthew Lowe (Labour)
- 1951–52 Zachariah Padgin Grayson
- 1952–53 Thomas Dennis
- 1953–54 H J T Russell
- 1954–55 Alec Ling (Conservative)
- 1955–56 A. J. Luckett
- 1956–57 J. H. Christmas (Labour)
- 1957–58 W. White (Labour)
- 1958–59 Mrs. F. Riggott
- 1959–60 G. A. Collier
- 1960–61 C. E. J. Andrews (Conservative)
- 1961–62 Tom Earnshaw
- 1962–63 Stuart W. Harper (Labour)
- 1963–64 Elsie Jane Mack (Conservative)
- 1964–65 John Dilworth – Labour
- 1965–66 W. H. Bonell
- 1966–67 Elsie Elizabeth Armstrong (1891–1981)
- 1967–68 Robert F. Stott
- 1968–69 Edith Wood (Conservative)
- 1969–70 Tom Taylor (Conservative)
- 1970–71 Eleanor Grimwood-Taylor (1915 – 29 March 2008) (Conservative)
- 1971–72 Joe Carty (Labour)
- 1972–73 George Guest (Labour)
- 1973–74 A. J. Bussell (Conservative)
- 1974–75 George Salt (Labour)
- 1975–76 Cyril Ufton (Labour)
- 1976–77 W. H. Baker (Labour)
- 1977–78 Jeffery Tillett (1927–2008) (Conservative)
- 1978–79 E. W. H. Reid (Conservative)
- 1979–80 Bob Newton (Labour)
- 1980–81 John Thorpe (Conservative)
- 1981–82 Florence Tunnicliffe (Labour)
- 1982–83 Norman Glen (Conservative)
- 1983–84 Margaret Wood (Labour)
- 1984–85 Ron Longdon (1926–1987) (Conservative)
- 1985–86 W Harry Matthews (Labour)
- 1986–87 R. G. Keene (Conservative)
- 1987–88 Nancy Wawman (Labour)
- 1988–89 Leslie Shepley (Conservative)
- 1989–90 Ray Baxter (Labour)
- 1990–91 Barry Chadwick (Conservative)
- 1991–92 John Keith (Conservative)
- 1992–93 Harold Johnson (Conservative)
- 1993–94 Robin Wood (Conservative)
- 1994–95 Nirmal Dhindsa (Labour)
- 1995–96 John McGiven (Labour)
- 1996–97 Alan Mullarkey (Labour)
- 1997–98 John Fuller(Labour)
- 1998–99 Abdul Rehman (Labour)
- 1999–2000 Sara Bolton (Labour)

== 21st century ==
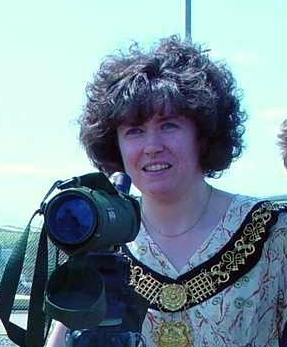
Ruth Skelton, Mayor of Derby in 2004

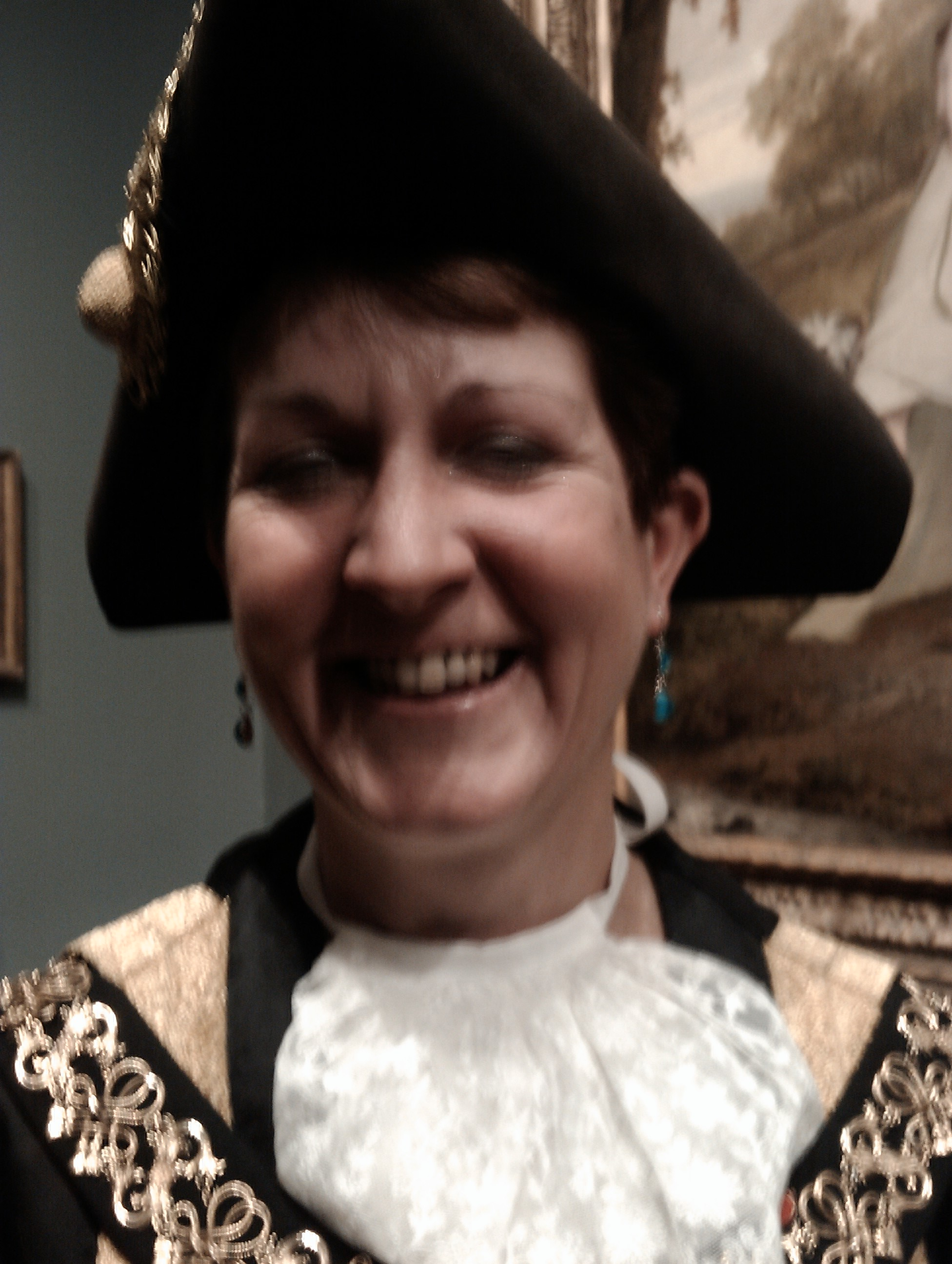
Lisa Higginbottom, Mayor of Derby in 2012

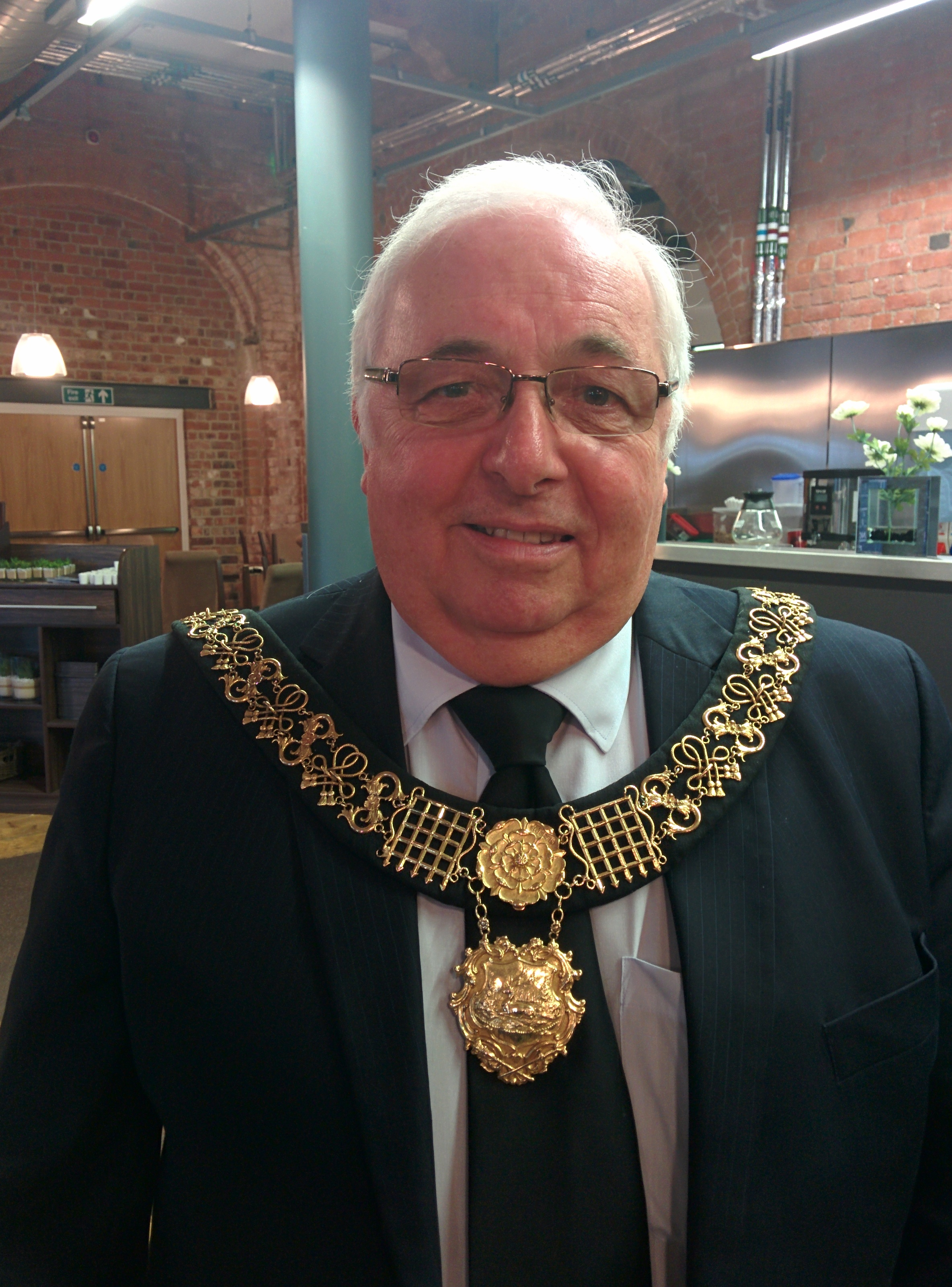
Paul Pegg, former Mayor of Derby at the Derby Book Festival in 2015

- 2000–01 Ashok Kalia (Labour)
- 2001–02 Janet Till (Labour)
- 2002–03 Robin Turner (Labour)
- 2003–04 Peter Berry (Conservative)
- 2004–05 Ruth Skelton (Liberal Democrat)
- 2005–06 Roy Webb (Conservative)
- 2006–07 John Ahern (Labour)
- 2007–08 Pauline Latham (Conservative)
- 2008–09 Barbara Jackson (Labour)
- 2009–10 Sean Marshall (Conservative)
- 2010–11 Amar Nath (Conservative)
- 2011–12 Les Allen(Liberal Democrat)
- 2012–13 Lisa Higginbottom (Labour)
- 2013–14 Fareed Hussain (Labour)
- 2014–15 Shiraz Khan (Labour)
- 2015–16 Paul Pegg (Labour)
- 2016–17 Linda Winter (Labour)
- 2017–18 John Whitby (Labour)
- 2018–19 Mike Carr (Liberal Democrat)
- 2019–20 Frank Harwood (Conservative then Independent June 2020)
- 2020–21 Frank Harwood (Independent then Liberal Democrat April 2021)
- 2021–23 Robin Wood (Conservative)
- 2023–24 Alan Graves (Reform Derby)
- 2024–25 Ged Potter (Conservative)
- 2025–26 Ajit Singh Atwal (Liberal Democrats)
- 2026–27 Jonathan Smale (Conservative)
