= Richard Bradshaw (puppeteer) =

Australian puppeteer

Richard Bradshaw OAM (born 1938) is a leading Australian puppeteer.

== Life ==
In June 1949 the Sydney Herald announced weekly shows for children at the Children's Theatre at Burnie Park, Clovelly directed by Edith Constance Murray. Leading Australian puppeteers Bradshaw, Norman Hetherington and John Lewis of Jeral Puppets were among those who demonstrated their skills at the theatre.

Bradshaw was artistic director of the Marionette Theatre of Australia. He is a shadow puppeteer who writes for puppets. In 2005, he was commissioned by Terrapin Puppet Theatre to write The Storyteller's Shadow: a Celebration of Hans Christian Andersen which toured around Tasmania, to Denmark and to Singapore and Malaysia. Jim Henson, a fellow puppeteer, featured the work of Bradshaw as part of his six-part television series on puppetry. His shadow puppets were used for animations and stories on ABC's Play School and were featured in an episode of The Muppet Show.

Bradshaw was awarded the Order of Australia Medal for services to puppetry and the performing arts.
