= Ryan Rivett =

American hotelier

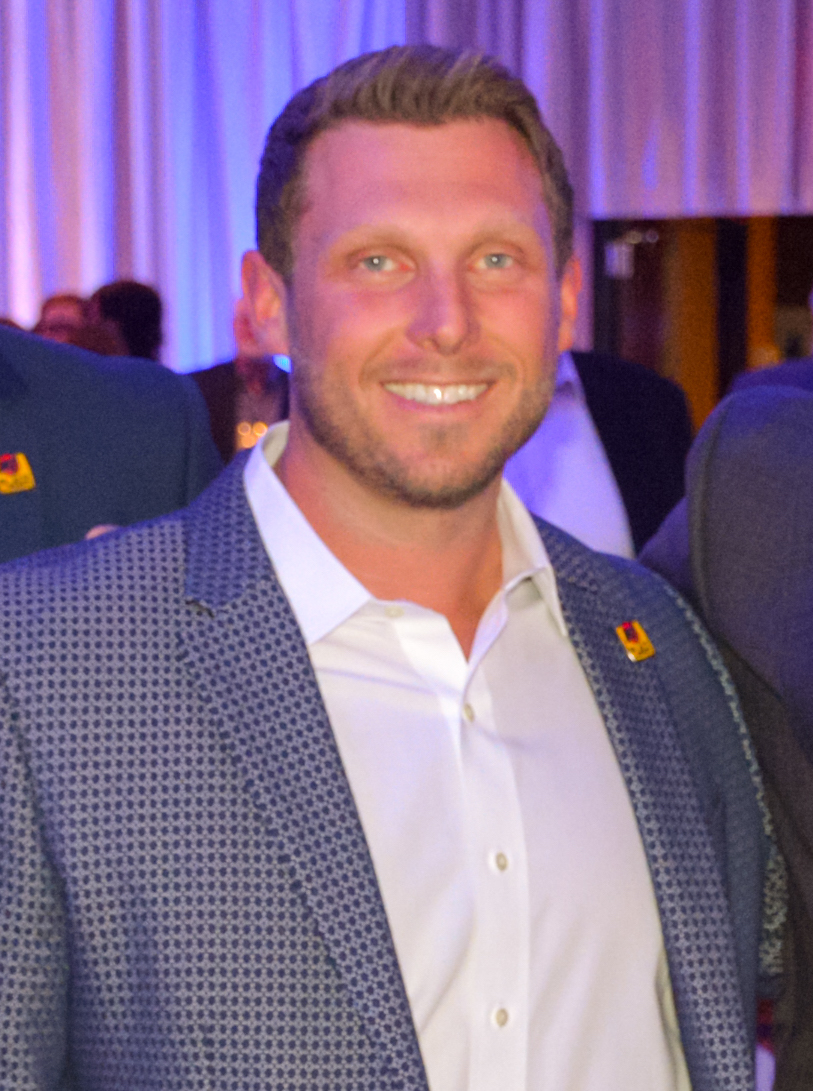
- Education: Northern State University
- Occupations: Hotelier and Entrepreneur
- Employer: My Place Hotels of America
- Known for: My Place Hotels, Trend Hotels & Suites
- Title: President & CEO
- Term: since 2017
- Relatives: Ron Rivett (grandfather)

Ryan Rivett is an American hotelier, and the President & CEO of My Place Hotels of America since 2017, succeeding his grandfather and My Place Hotels co-founder Ron Rivett. The Rivett family still owns and operates the first-ever Super 8 hotel in Aberdeen, South Dakota, where Ron Rivett co-founded the brand in 1973.

In 2020, Rivett was cited as a source in The Washington Post.

== Biography ==
Rivett is a graduate of Northern State University, having received a B.S. degree in management in 2006.

Rivett founded My Place Hotels of America alongside grandfather Ron Rivett in 2012. Rivett (Ryan) succeeded Ron Rivett in 2017.

In June 2020 Rivett announced Trend Hotels & Suites, a new "conversion" brand by My Place Hotels of America.

He has 4 kids which go by the name of “Jaxon Rivett”, "Keira Rivett", "Logan Rivett" and "Layla Rivett".
