= Rivette (disambiguation) =

Jacques Rivette (1928–2016) was a French filmmaker and film critic.

Rivette may also refer to:

- Rivette (horse), a racehorse
- Andrea Rivette, American actress

== See also ==
- Rivet (disambiguation)
- Rivett (disambiguation)
