= Rivet (surname) =

Rivet is a surname. Notable people with the surname include:

- André Rivet (1572–1651), French Huguenot theologian
- Craig Rivet (born 1974), Canadian hockey player
- Élise Rivet (1890–1945), Catholic nun and war heroine
- Jeanne Rivet (1850–1913), French composer
- Louis-Alfred-Adhémar Rivet (1873–1951), Canadian lawyer and politician
- Paul Rivet (1876–1958), French ethnologist
