= Albert Rivett (pastor) =

Australian clergyman and pacifist

Rev. Albert Rivett (17 May 1855 – 18 November 1934) was an Australian clergyman and pacifist.

== History ==
Albert Rivett, sen., was born in Norwich, England, a son of Amy Rivett, née Riches and her husband, bricklayer William Rivett, who died when Albert was quite young and was brought up in a family of Quakers. He studied theology at Harley College, East London, and in August 1879 was sent to Australia aboard Hesperus by the Colonial Missionary Society. He was first put in charge of the Independent (i.e. Congregationalist) church in Brunswick, Victoria, then Port Esperance in Southern Tasmania, returning to Brunswick in 1887. His next postings were to churches in Yarrawonga then Beechworth, Victoria in 1896, followed by Albury, New South Wales, and the Whitefield Congregational Church, Protestant Hall, Castlereagh Street, Sydney, in 1908.

In 1891, while at Yarrawonga he began publishing a series of monthly magazines titled The Murray Independent, sub-titled "Journal of Applied Christianity" dealing with (amongst other, local, issues) free speech, the abolition of war, of Socialist values and the policies of Henry George. When he moved to Sydney the paper became The Federal Independent.

In 1915 he resigned from Whitefield and the ministry because of the congregation's antagonism to his views on World War I.

Rivett had also opposed the Boer War and was a vocal opponent of Billy Hughes and conscription in 1916–17.

His last campaign was against the Australian Government's support of Fascism and the banning from Australia of the Czehcoslovak journalist Egon Kisch. It was while addressing a crowd of some 5,000 supporters of Kisch at The Domain, Sydney that he collapsed and died.

He had a home "Esperance" at McIntosh Street, Gordon, New South Wales.

== Family ==
Rivett married Elizabeth Mary Ann Cherbury (c. 1862 – August 1936), daughter of the (Baptist) Rev. Charles Mortimer Cherbury of Fitzroy, Victoria, on 20 October 1881. Their children included:

- Dr. Sir Albert Cherbury David Rivett (1885–1961), of the Council of Scientific and Industrial Research. He married Stella Deakin, daughter of Alfred Deakin

- Rohan Deakin Rivett (1917–1977), POW and journalist
- Dr Kenneth Deakin Rivett (1923–2004), economist

- Dr. Edward William Rivett (1894–1962) of Macquarie Street, Sydney
- Eleanor Harriet "Nell" "Nellie" Rivett (27 September 1883 – 21 May 1972), Principal of the Girls' High School, Calcutta
- Elsie Grace Rivett (13 September 1887 – 23 May 1964)
- Dr. Olive Rivett (1889–1981) married Rev. J. F. Long, B.A. (died 1955) on 25 September 1914, of the Australian Methodist Mission in Azumgarh
- Dr. Christine Rivett (28 February 1891 – 14 July 1962), medical practitioner, Brisbane
- (Doris) Mary Rivett (4 December 1896 – 15 January 1969) psychologist, married Thomas Matheson on 13 January 1934.

Mary and Elsie ran a children's library at Surry Hills.
