= Thomas Rivett (1713–1763) =

High Sheriff of Derbyshire (1713–1763)

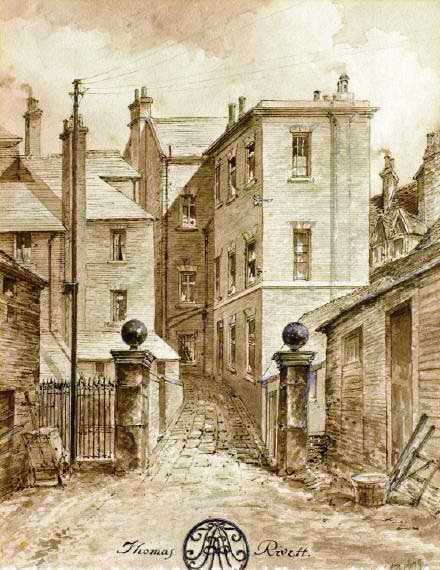
- Rivetts House by S.H.Parkins
- Born: 1713
- Died: 6 April 1763 (aged 49–50)
- Occupations: barrister and politician
- Known for: High Sheriff of Derbyshire (1757) and Mayor of Derby (1761)
- Successor: Hugo Meynell (High Sheriff)
- Spouse: Anna Maria Sibley
- Children: Thomas, James and Elizabeth
- Parent(s): Thomas Rivett and Elizabeth Eaton

Thomas Rivett, Esq. (1713–1763) was a British barrister and politician.

== Biography ==
Thomas Rivett was a Whig M.P. for Derby between 1748 and 1753, High Sheriff of Derbyshire in 1757. In 1761, like his father, he became Mayor of Derby. He married Anna Maria Sibley in April 1749 with whom he had three children: Thomas, James and Elizabeth.

Thomas Rivett was one of the three owners of the «Cockpit Hill Potworks» china factory, together with William Butts and John Heath.

Thomas Rivett's monogram and his house were drawn by S.H.Parkins and that was given to Derby Museum and Art Gallery.

Parliament of Great Britain
Preceded by John Stanhope; Viscount Duncannon	Member of Parliament for Derby; 1748–1754; With: Viscount Duncannon	Succeeded by Lord Frederick Cavendish; George Venables-Vernon
