= Thomas Rivett =

British politician (1679–1724)

- Born: 1679
- Died: 1724 (aged 44–45)
- Occupations: landowner and politician
- Known for: Mayor of Derby
- Successor: John Bagnold Thomas (1716)
- Spouse: Elizabeth Eaton
- Children: Thomas Rivett, Esq., and Sarah Rivett
- Parent(s): Thomas Rivett and Rebecca Agard

Thomas Rivett (1679–1724) was a British politician. He was Mayor of Derby in 1715. He married Elizabeth Eaton on 9 December 1708 with whom he had two children: Thomas Rivett, Esq., and Sarah Rivett.
