= Rohan Rivett =

Australian journalist (1917–1977)

Rohan Deakin Rivett (16 January 1917 – 5 October 1977) was an Australian journalist and author, and influential editor of the Adelaide newspaper The News from 1951 to 1960. He is chiefly remembered for accounts of his experiences on the Burma Railway and his activism in the Max Stuart case.

== Early years ==
Rivett was born in Melbourne, Victoria, the elder son of Sir David Rivett and his wife Stella née Deakin. He was a grandson of the former Prime Minister of Australia Alfred Deakin and of the Rev. Albert Rivett (1855–1934), a noted pacifist.

He was educated at Wesley College and, in 1935, went on to study history and politics at the University of Melbourne, earning a B.A. with first-class honours in 1938. With classmate Manning Clark, he enrolled to study at Balliol College, Oxford, arriving in October 1938. When World War II began, he and Clark abandoned their studies and returned to Australia with the intention of joining the AIF.

== World War II ==
Unable to enlist, he joined The Argus as a cadet journalist. He visited Moscow in 1939 and, on his return, received his first byline. On 2 January 1940, he married Gwyneth Maude Terry, a student, at St John's Church of England, Camberwell. On 7 June, he successfully enlisted in the AIF.

In August 1940, Rivett was recruited by the Department of Information to read news bulletins for broadcast over Radio Australia. In December 1941, he volunteered to work for the Malayan Broadcasting Commission (or Corporation), which had been set up in Singapore to counter Japanese propaganda, and was discharged from the AIF. He also continued to write for The Argus.

== Burma Railway ==
On 9 February 1942, he broadcast the news that Japan had invaded the island, and he then escaped from Singapore. The refugee ship was bombed, but he was one of those who survived. However, on about 4 March 1942, after several weeks of evasion, he was captured by the Japanese on Java and sent to work on the Burma Railway.

He returned to Australia in 1945 and a series of articles on his experiences were published in the Argus and elsewhere. In October and November 1945 he "vividly" described his experiences in Behind Bamboo – the book was first published in Sydney in 1946, and was subsequently reprinted eight times, selling more than 100,000 copies.

== Post-war career ==
In January 1946, he joined the Melbourne newspaper The Herald. He was sent to China in July 1947 to report on the Civil War, then to London for the Herald-owned Adelaide Advertiser and the Brisbane Courier Mail in 1948, from where he reported on French, German and English post-war reconstruction, the lifting of the Berlin Blockade, and also cricket, for which Rivett had a life-long love (he and Sir Donald Bradman kept up a regular correspondence from 1953 to 1977). He returned to Australia in 1951 to take up an appointment as editor-in-chief of the Adelaide paper The News, Sir Keith Murdoch's evening tabloid newspaper, and the founding publication of what was to become News Limited.

Rivett was a popular commentator on radio, and once had the distinction of having a scheduled broadcast on the Suez Crisis censored. He was a regular commentator on the ABC's Notes on the News programme.

One campaign for which Rivett is particularly remembered was the "Stuart Case". Max Stuart, an Aboriginal Australian, was convicted of the rape and murder of a child at Ceduna, South Australia, and sentenced to death. The News was critical of the handling of the case, arguing that Stuart was not getting a fair trial, and urged the Playford government to set up a Royal Commission. On 3 December 1959, the Commission found the case against Stuart wholly justified and, seven weeks later, The News and Rivett were tried on nine charges, including seditious libel. The jury trial was held over ten days from 7 March 1960, with Dr. John Bray representing the accused, who were found not guilty on all but one charge. At that stage, Playford's Liberal and Country League government dropped the case, perhaps because of the adverse publicity it was generating. Stuart's sentence was commuted to life imprisonment and he was released on parole in 1973.

In 1960, Sir Keith Murdoch's son, Rupert, sacked Rivett on generous terms, because he considered the editor to be unreliable and uncontrollable. Rivett soon found employment at the International Press Institute in Zurich but returned to Melbourne in 1963, where he worked as a freelance journalist, featuring in The Canberra Times and Nation Review.

In 1973, he was elected president of the Melbourne Press Club, being succeeded by Keith Dunstan in 1976.

On 5 October 1977, he died of a heart attack at his Camberwell home. He was cremated.

== Family ==
On 2 January 1940, he married Gwyneth Maude Terry. Their only child, a son who lived only a few hours, was born while Rivett was a prisoner on Java. They later divorced.

On 17 October 1947, he married actress Nancy Ethel "Nan" Summers. They had three children:

- (Katherine) Rhyll (June 1948 – ) commenced, but never completed, a biography of her father.
- David Christopher (June 1948 – )
- Keith Rohan (12 February 1953 – )

== Recognition ==
- Rohan Rivett Crescent, in the Canberra suburb of McKellar, is named for him.

== Bibliography ==
- Rivett, Rohan D., Behind Bamboo Sydney, 1946
- Rivett, Rohan, The Listener in Test Cricket, 1948
- Rivett, Rohan, Australian Citizen: Herbert Brookes, 1867–1963, 1965
- Rivett, Rohan, David Rivett: Fighter for Australian Science, 1972
