= Ron Rivett =

American entrepreneur

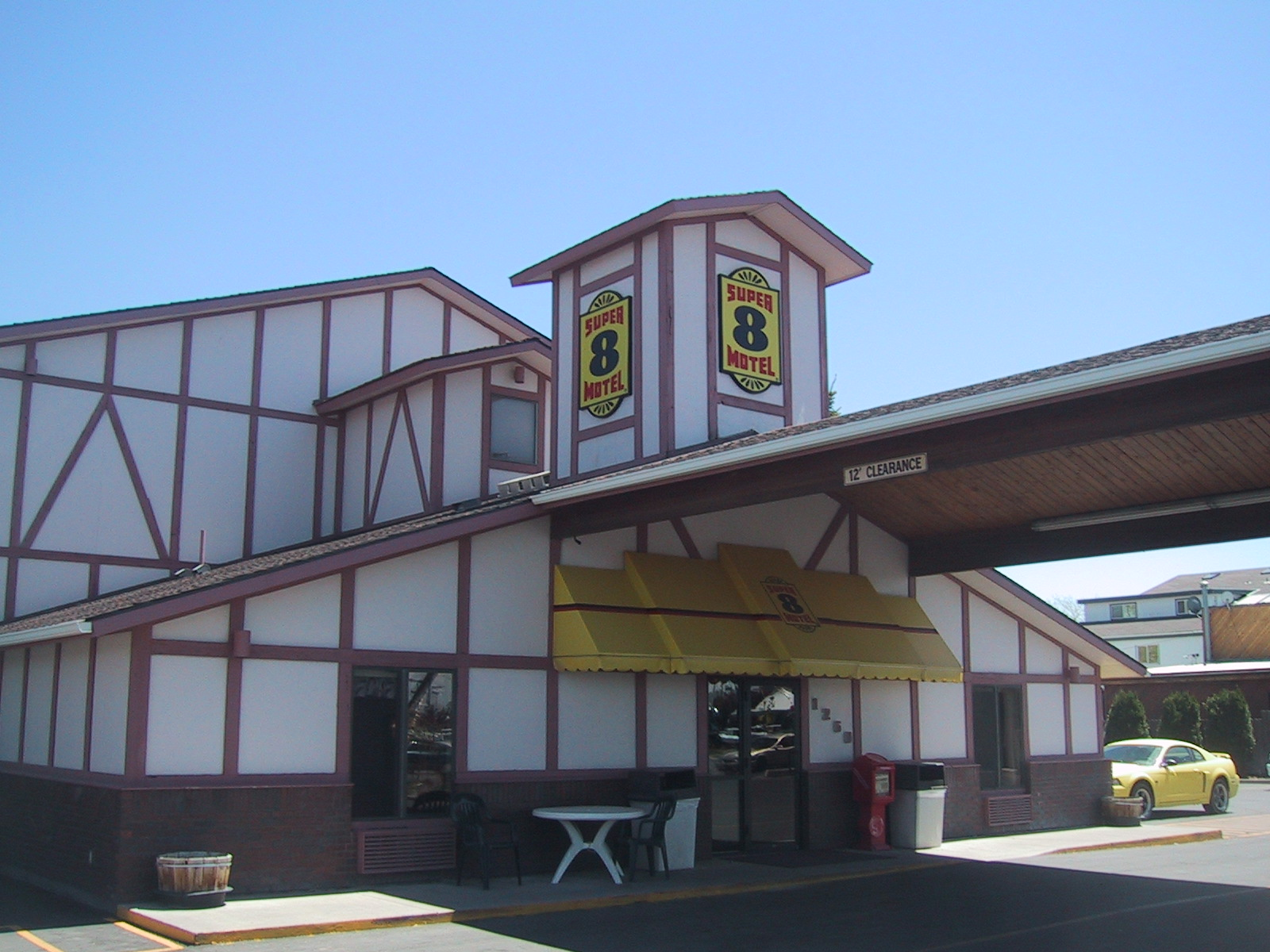
Super 8 Motel in Twin Falls, Idaho

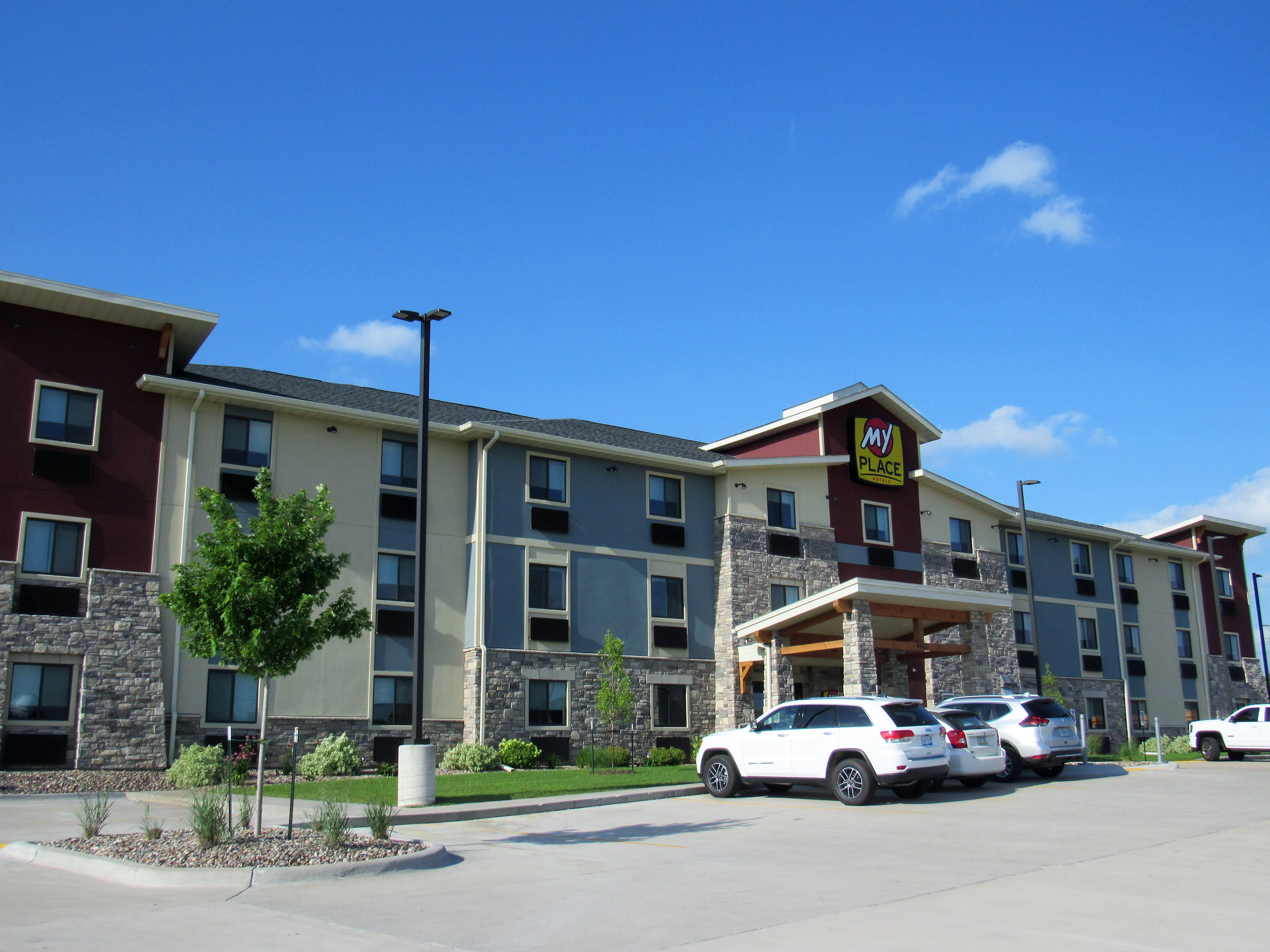
My Place Hotel in Davenport, Iowa

Ron Rivett (August 2, 1940 – December 9, 2023) was an American entrepreneur. He was best known for being founder of Super 8 Motels and My Place hotels. By 1993, Super 8 had 1,000 locations worldwide. Super 8 grew to be the largest budget hotel chain in the world. In 1993, Rivett sold Super 8 Motels to Hospitality Franchise Systems for $125 million.

In 2012, he founded My Place Hotels of America, which is known for its brands My Place Hotels and Trend Hotels & Suites. Rivett served as the chairman for My Place Hotels of America.

On December 9, 2023, Rivett died at Baptist Medical Center in Miami, FL

== Education ==
Rivett graduated from Northern State University with a degree in business in 1963 and received an honorary “Doctorate of Humane Letters” from NSU in 1990.

== My Place Hotels of America ==
My Place Hotels of America is a hospitality company in the United States headquartered in Aberdeen, South Dakota.

The company announced My Place Hotels alongside its franchising system in 2014. The brand was founded by Rivett and grandson Ryan (Rivett) in 2012. The hospitality company had 56 My Place Hotels open across 27 states as of June 2020.

The company announced a new brand, Trend Hotels & Suites, in June 2020.
