= David Rivett =

Australian chemist and scientist (1885–1961)

Sir David Rivett KCMG FRS FAA
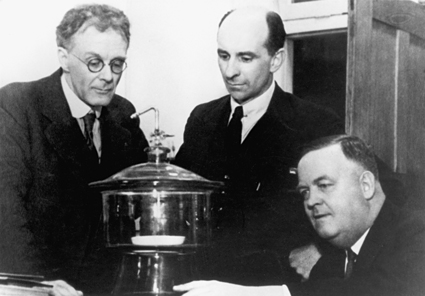
- George Julius, David Rivett and Arnold Richardson

Chairman of the CSIRO
- In office 1 January 1946 – 18 May 1949
- Preceded by: George Julius
- Succeeded by: Ian Clunies Ross

Chief Executive of the CSIRO
- In office 1 January 1927 – 31 December 1945
- Preceded by: Office established
- Succeeded by: A E V Richardson

Personal details
- Born: Albert Cherbury David Rivett; 4 December 1885
- Died: 1 April 1961 (aged 75)
- Education: University of Melbourne
- Awards: Rhodes Scholarship; Fellow of the Royal Society (1941); James Cook Medal (1953)

Sir Albert Cherbury David Rivett KCMG FRS FAA (4 December 1885 – 1 April 1961) was an Australian chemist and science administrator.

== Background and education ==
Rivett was born at Port Esperance, Tasmania, Australia, a son of the Rev. Albert Rivett (1855–1934), a noted pacifist. His younger sisters included the children's library founders Elsie Rivett and Mary Matheson. He studied at Wesley College, Melbourne and the University of Melbourne, where he was a member of Queen's College, Melbourne, obtaining a Bachelor of Science degree in 1906 and a Doctor of Science degree in 1913. He was a Rhodes Scholar at Lincoln College, Oxford, where he did research under the supervision of Nevil Sidgwick in the laboratories of Magdalen College, Oxford. He was awarded a Bachelor of Arts degree with First Class Honours in 1909, and a Bachelor of Science degree with First Class Honours in 1910.

== Career ==
In 1910 Rivett spent six months at the Nobel Institute of Physical Chemistry at Stockholm working with the Director, Svante Arrhenius. In 1911 he returned to Australia as Lecturer in Chemistry at the University of Melbourne. On 11 November 1911 he married Stella Deakin, daughter of Alfred Deakin, a former Prime Minister of Australia. Stella, a research chemist, had first met David when both were students at the University of Melbourne.

In 1914 he was organising secretary of the 84th meeting of the British Association for the Advancement of Science, with the committee chaired by David Orme Masson. This was the first time the meeting had been held outside the United Kingdom. Rivett left extensive archives of this meeting.

Rivett was away from Australia during World War I from 1915 to 1919. In August 1915 he accepted a commission in the Australian Army Medical Corps Reserve, but from 1917 he was involved in the production of pure ammonium nitrate, used for explosives, at the British munitions works at Swindon. The understanding gained there led to the publication in 1924 of The Phase Rule and the Study of Heterogeneous Equilibria, and to an appreciation of the value of fundamental research for industrial applications.

He became Associate Professor at the University of Melbourne in 1921 and succeeded Professor David Orme Masson, with whom he had previously worked, as Professor of Chemistry in 1924. From 1923 to 1927, he lived in what is now University House at the University of Melbourne.

He was Deputy chairman and chief executive officer, 'Council for Scientific and Industrial Research' (CSIR) from 1927 to 1946 and Chairman of the Council of the renamed Commonwealth Scientific and Industrial Research Organisation (CSIRO) from 1946 to 1949.

In 1935 he was made a Knight Commander of the Order of St Michael and St George (KCMG). He became a Fellow of the Royal Society of London in 1941 and was a Foundation fellow of the Australian Academy of Science in 1954. He served as president of the Australian and New Zealand Association for the Advancement of Science from 1937 to 1939.

He died at Sydney in 1961.

The Australian Capital Territory suburb of Rivett is named after him.

== Family ==
In 1911 he married Stella Deakin, second daughter of former Prime Minister of Australia Alfred Deakin. Sir David and Lady Rivett had two children: journalist Rohan Deakin Rivett (1917–1977) and academic economist Dr Kenneth Deakin Rivett (1923–2004).
