= William Allestry =

William Allestry may refer to:

- William Allestry (1588–1655), English politician, MP for Derby
- William Allestry (died 1590s), MP for Derby
- William Allestry (died 1700) (c. 1642–c. 1700), English lawyer and politician, MP for Derby
