= Anchitell Grey =

English politician

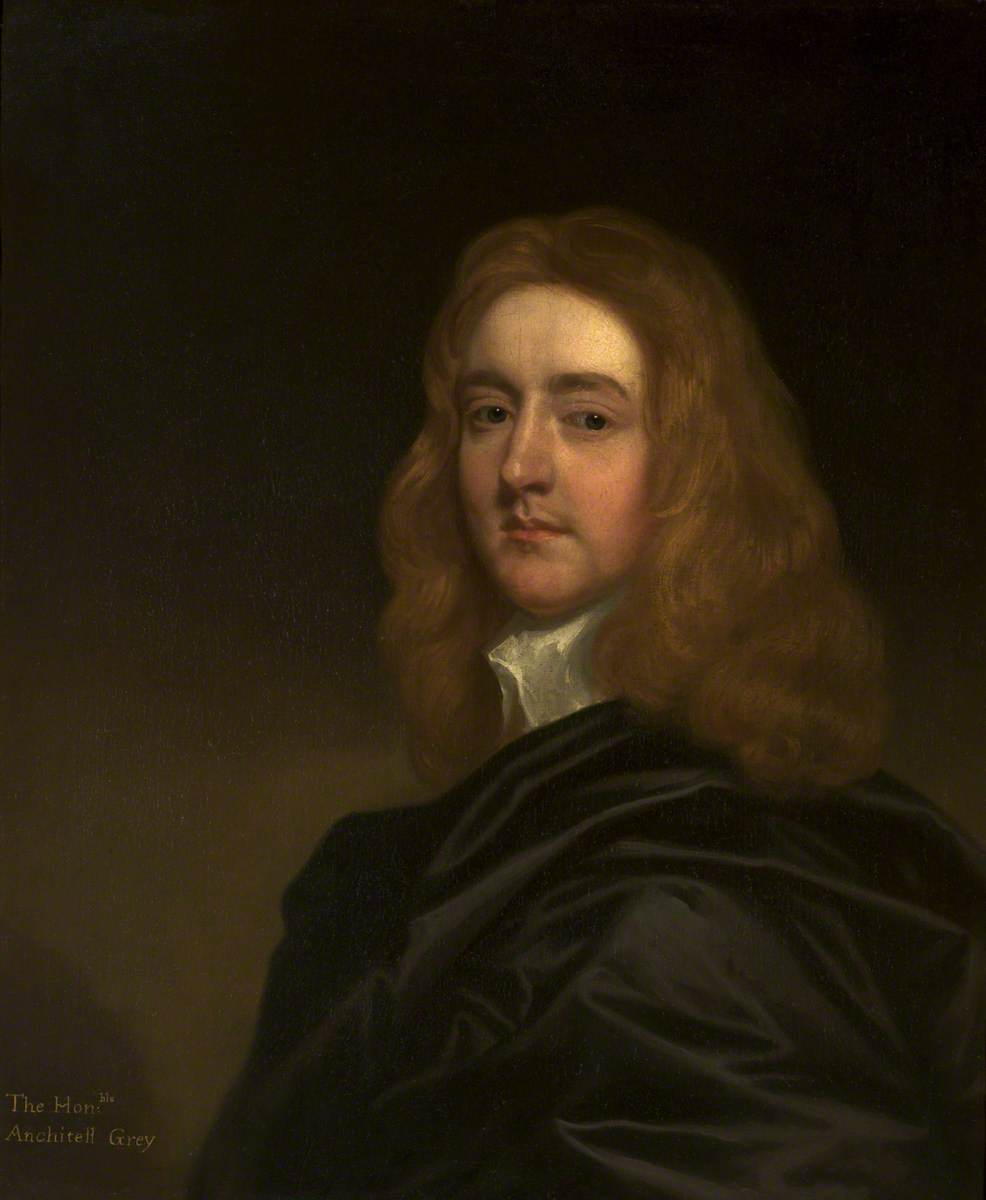

The Hon. Anchitell Grey (c. 1624 – 8 July 1702) was an English politician who sat in the House of Commons in two periods between 1665 and 1695. Although he spoke rarely, he kept a detailed diary of proceedings in the House of Commons, summarising the speeches he heard. The diary, published in the 18th century, is the main surviving record for the debates in Parliament in most of the period that it covers.

== Early life ==
Grey was the second son of Henry Grey, 1st Earl of Stamford and his wife Lady Anne Cecil, daughter of William Cecil, 2nd Earl of Exeter. He was the younger brother of Thomas Grey, Lord Grey of Groby.

He was likely educated at home as little is known about his education.

== Career ==
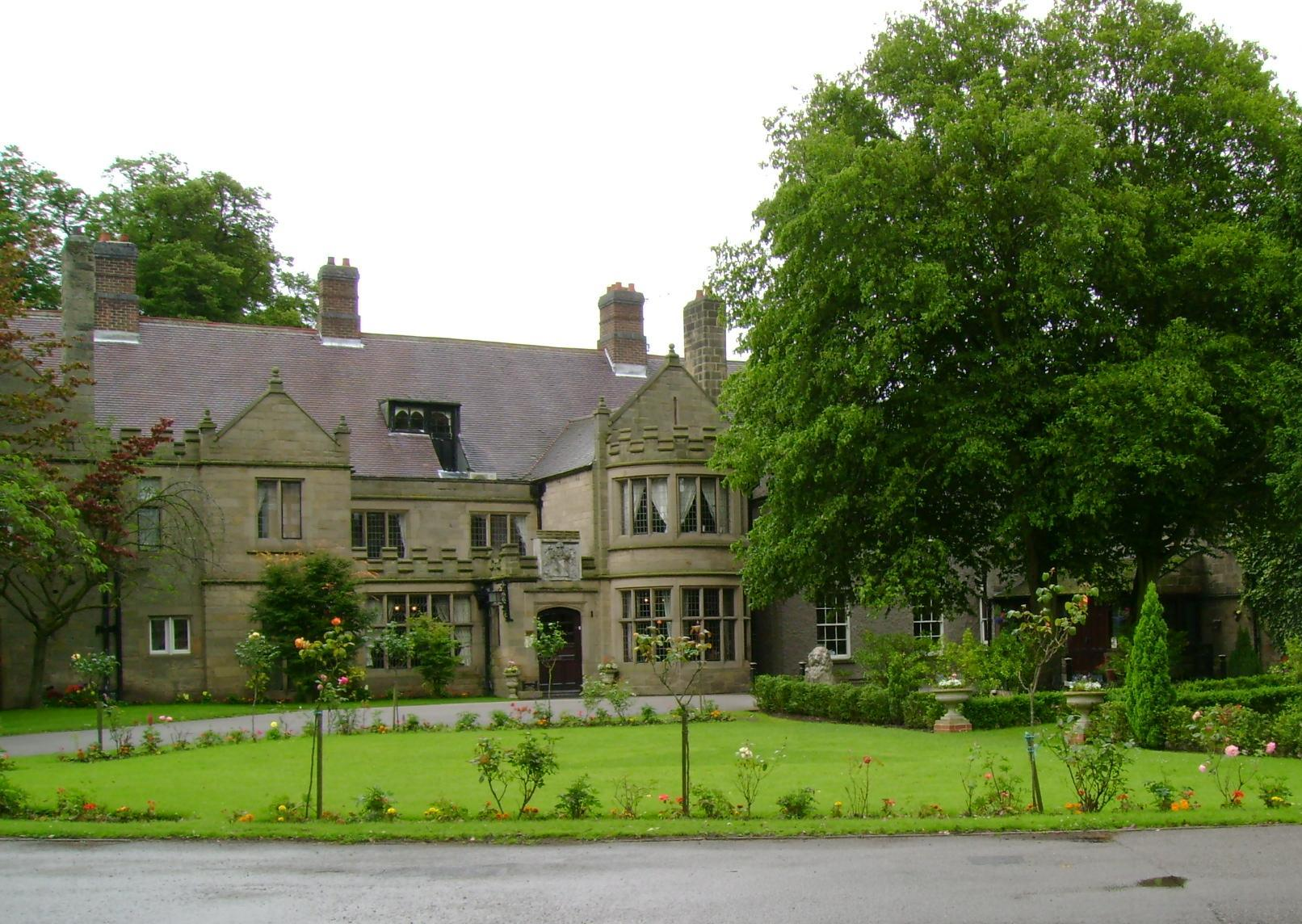
Risley Hall, Derbyshire

Grey's marriage brought him connections that likely led to his early appointments to local office. Grey served as a commissioner for assessment in Derbyshire in 1657, and was appointed High Sheriff of Nottinghamshire for 1657–58. A Royalist, in 1659, he was arrested for supporting his brother-in-law Sir George Booth's uprising against the Rump Parliament.

After the Restoration, Grey was elected Member of Parliament for Derby in 1665 in the Cavalier Parliament. He was re-elected MP for Derby in 1679 for the First and Second Exclusion Parliaments and again in 1681. In 1689 he was elected MP for Derby again and sat until 1695.

Begun in 1667, Grey's parliamentary diary continued through 25 April 1694. Originally lost, Grey's manuscript Debates of the House of Commons from 1667 to 1694 was first published in 10 volumes in 1763 after it was found, and republished most recently in 2007.

== Personal life ==
Grey was married to Anne (née Willoughby), Lady Aston, the daughter and co-heiress of Sir Henry Willoughby, 1st Baronet. The widow of Sir Thomas Aston, 1st Baronet, she was mother to Sir Willoughby Aston, 2nd Baronet. Anne inherited her father's estate at Risley Hall in Derbyshire. Together, they had a son and a daughter:

- Willoughby Grey (d. 1701), who died unmarried.
- Elizabeth Grey (d. 1721), who died unmarried.

Grey died of cancer of the mouth at Risley Hall in the summer of 1702, and was buried next to Anne, who had died in 1688. His daughter was a benefactor to three schools at Risley founded by her ancestor, Sir Michael Willoughby.

Parliament of England
Preceded by Roger Allestry; John Dalton	Member of Parliament for Derby; 1665–1685; With: John Dalton 1665–1679; George Vernon 1679–1685	Succeeded by William Allestry; John Coke
Preceded by William Allestry; John Coke	Member of Parliament for Derby; 1689–1695; With: John Coke 1689–1690; Robert Wilmot 1690–1695	Succeeded by Lord Henry Cavendish; John Bagnold
