= Aston baronets =

Title in the Baronetage of England

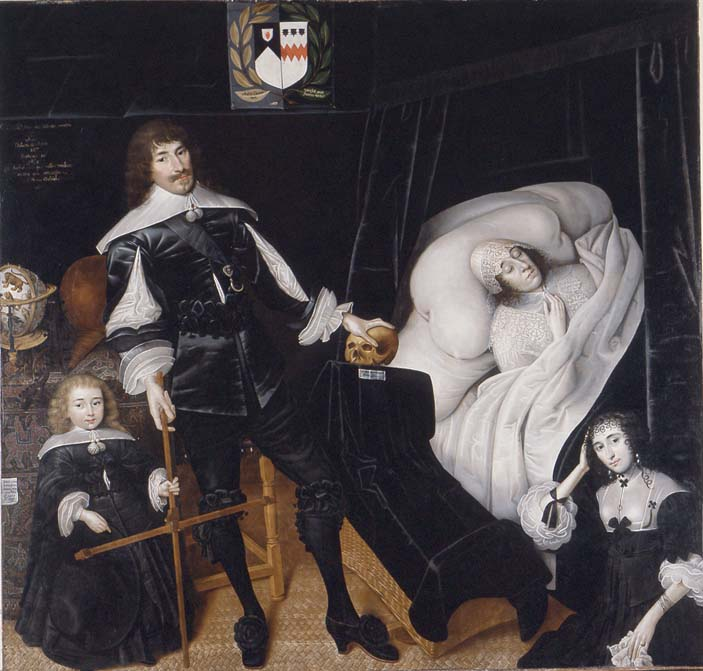
Sir Thomas Aston, 1st Baronet, of Aston, at the deathbed of his first wife, painted by John Souch (c. 1593–1646)

There have been two baronetcies created for persons with the surname Aston, both in the Baronetage of England. Both creations are extinct.

The Aston Baronetcy, of Tixall in the County of Stafford, was created in the Baronetage of England on 22 May 1611 for Walter Aston of Tixall Hall. He was later created Lord Aston of Forfar in 1627 with which the baronetcy merged until its extinction in 1751.

The Aston Baronetcy, of Aston in the County of Chester, was created in the Baronetage of England on 25 July 1628 for Thomas Aston, Member of Parliament for Cheshire. His great-grandson, the fourth Baronet sat for Liverpool and St Albans in the British House of Commons. He died childless in 1744 and was succeeded by a son of the younger son of the second Baronet. The latter represented Nottingham in the Parliament. After the death of his son, the sixth Baronet, the baronetcy became extinct in 1815. Their seat was Aston Hall, Aston-by-Sutton, which was demolished in 1938.

== Aston baronets, of Tixall (1611) ==
- see Lord Aston of Forfar

== Aston baronets, of Aston (1628) ==
Escutcheon of the Aston baronets of Aston

- Sir Thomas Aston, 1st Baronet (1600–1646)
- Sir Willoughby Aston, 2nd Baronet (1640–1702)
- Sir Thomas Aston, 3rd Baronet (1656–1725)
- Sir Thomas Aston, 4th Baronet (c. 1705–1744)
- Sir Willoughby Aston, 5th Baronet (c. 1715–1772)
- Sir Willoughby Aston, 6th Baronet (c. 1748–1815)

Baronetage of England
Preceded by Gerard baronets	Aston baronets 22 May 1611	Succeeded by Knyvett baronets
Baronetage of England
Preceded by Bolles baronets	Aston baronets 25 July 1628	Succeeded by Jenoure baronets
