= Willoughby baronets of Baldon House (1794) =

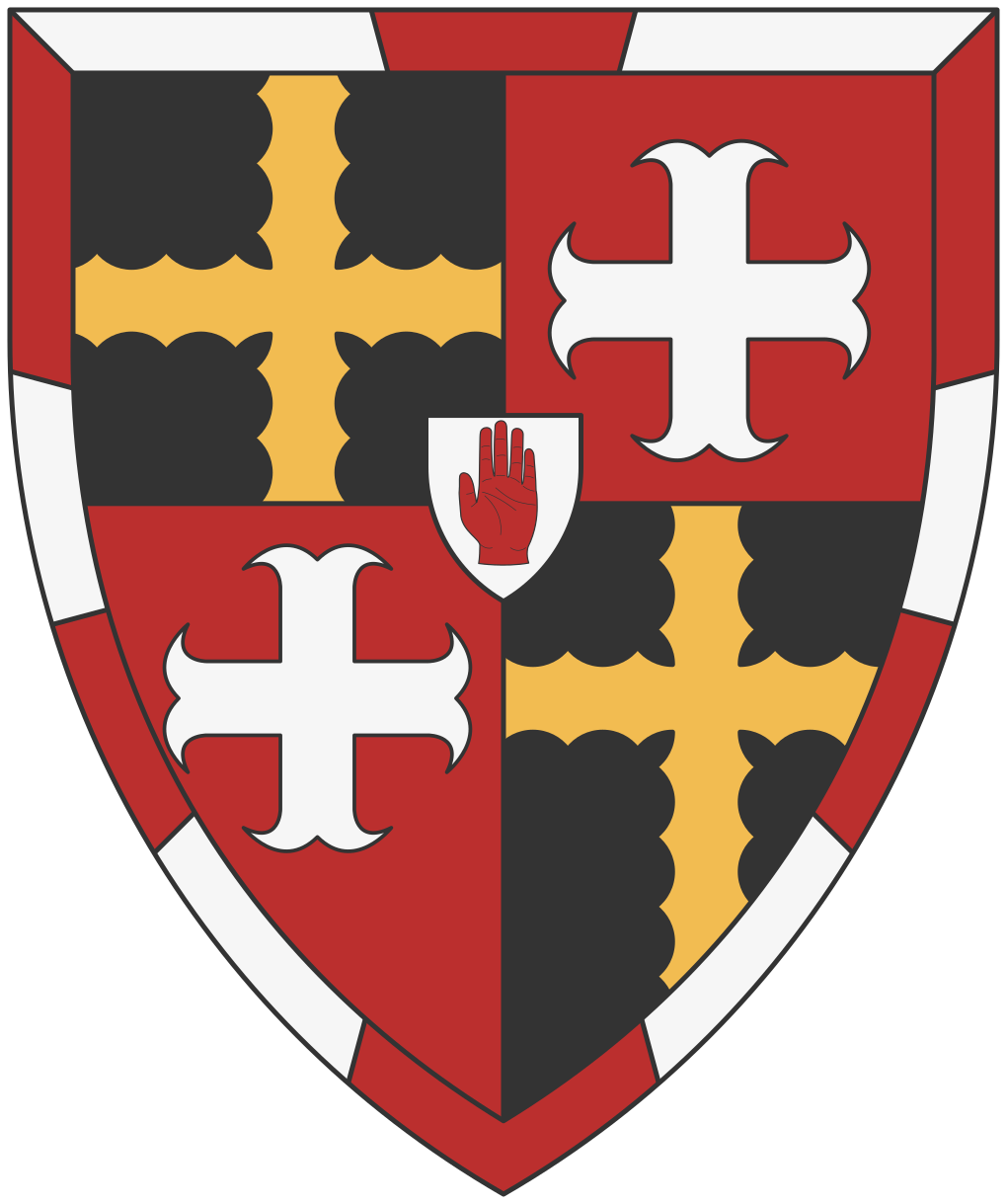
Arms of Willoughby of Baldon House

The Willoughby baronetcy, of Baldon House in the County of Oxford, was created in the Baronetage of Great Britain on 8 December 1794 for Christopher Willoughby. An improving agriculturalist, he "promoted the cultivation of swedes in elaborate crop rotations, innovatory methods of tillage and, unfashionably, the use of open fields for growing corn."

The 3rd Baronet sat as Member of Parliament for Yarmouth, Newcastle-under-Lyme and Evesham. The 4th Baronet, involved with the administration of British India represented Leominster in the House of Commons, elected in 1857. The title became extinct on the death of the 5th Baronet in 1918.

== Willoughby baronets, of Baldon House (1794) ==
- Sir Christopher Willoughby, 1st Baronet (1748–1808)
- Sir Christopher William Willoughby, 2nd Baronet (1793–1813)
- Sir Henry Pollard Willoughby, 3rd Baronet (1796–1865)
- Sir John Pollard Willoughby, 4th Baronet (1799–1866)
- Sir John Christopher Willoughby, 5th Baronet (1859–1918)

== Notes ==
Baronetage of Great Britain
Preceded by Sanderson baronets	Willoughby baronets of Baldon House; 8 December 1794	Succeeded by Prescott baronets
