= Sir Thomas Aston, 1st Baronet =

English politician and army officer (1600–1645)

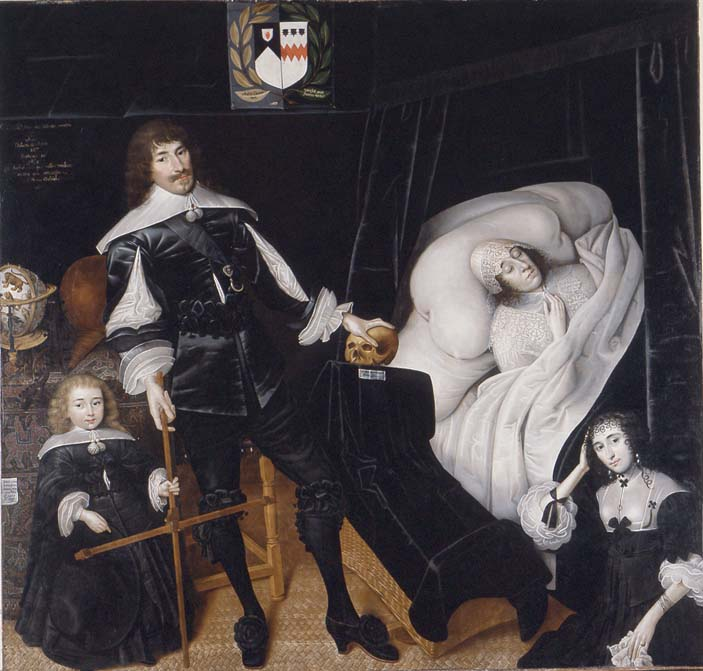
Portrait of Aston at the deathbed of his first wife by John Souch (c. 1593–1646). The arms are Aston impaling Pulteney

Sir Thomas Aston, 1st Baronet (29 September 1600 – 24 March 1645) was an English politician and army officer who sat in the House of Commons in 1640. He fought for the Royalist cause in the English Civil War. The portrait he commissioned from John Souch of his first wife Magdalene, Lady Aston (née Magdalen Pulteney) on her deathbed is in Manchester Art Gallery. He is known as an apologist for the Church of England.

== Early life ==
Arms of Pulteney: Argent, a fess dancettée gules in chief three leopard's faces sable

Aston was born in Shropshire, the eldest son of John Aston of Aston, Cheshire and Maud (née Needham) Aston.

His maternal grandparents were Robert Needham Esq. and Frances Needham. His uncle was the soldier Arthur Aston.

He matriculated at Brasenose College, Oxford on 28 March 1617, aged 16, and graduated with a Bachelor of Arts on 8 July 1619. In 1620, he was called to the bar by Lincoln's Inn.

== Career ==
Aston was created a baronet of Aston, in the County of Chester by King Charles I of England on 25 July 1628. He was appointed High Sheriff of Cheshire in 1635. In April 1640 he was elected Member of Parliament for Cheshire in the Short Parliament.

=== Civil War ===
When the First English Civil War broke out between the King and Parliament, Aston took part with the Royalists, and was in command at Middlewich in March 1643, when he was defeated by Sir William Brereton in the First Battle of Middlewich. The Royalists lost two cannons and five hundred stand of arms. Few were killed, but the prisoners included many of the principal Royalists who took part, and the town suffered at the hands of the Parliamentarians, who made free with the property of burgesses and the plate of the church. Aston escaped, but when a few days later he returned to Chester, he was placed under arrest at Pulford, where he wrote a defence of his conduct which furnishes a very minute account of the affair. William Axon stated in his biography on Aston in the DNB that this was an interesting picture of the Civil War.

Aston apparently freed himself from censure and rejoined the King's army and, indeed, is said to have suffered a second defeat from Brereton at Macclesfield in 1643. He was afterwards captured in a skirmish in Staffordshire. When in prison at Stafford he tried to escape, but the attempt was discovered by a soldier who struck him on the head. This and other wounds received in the war brought on a fever, of which he died on 24 March 1645 at Stafford.

== Personal life ==
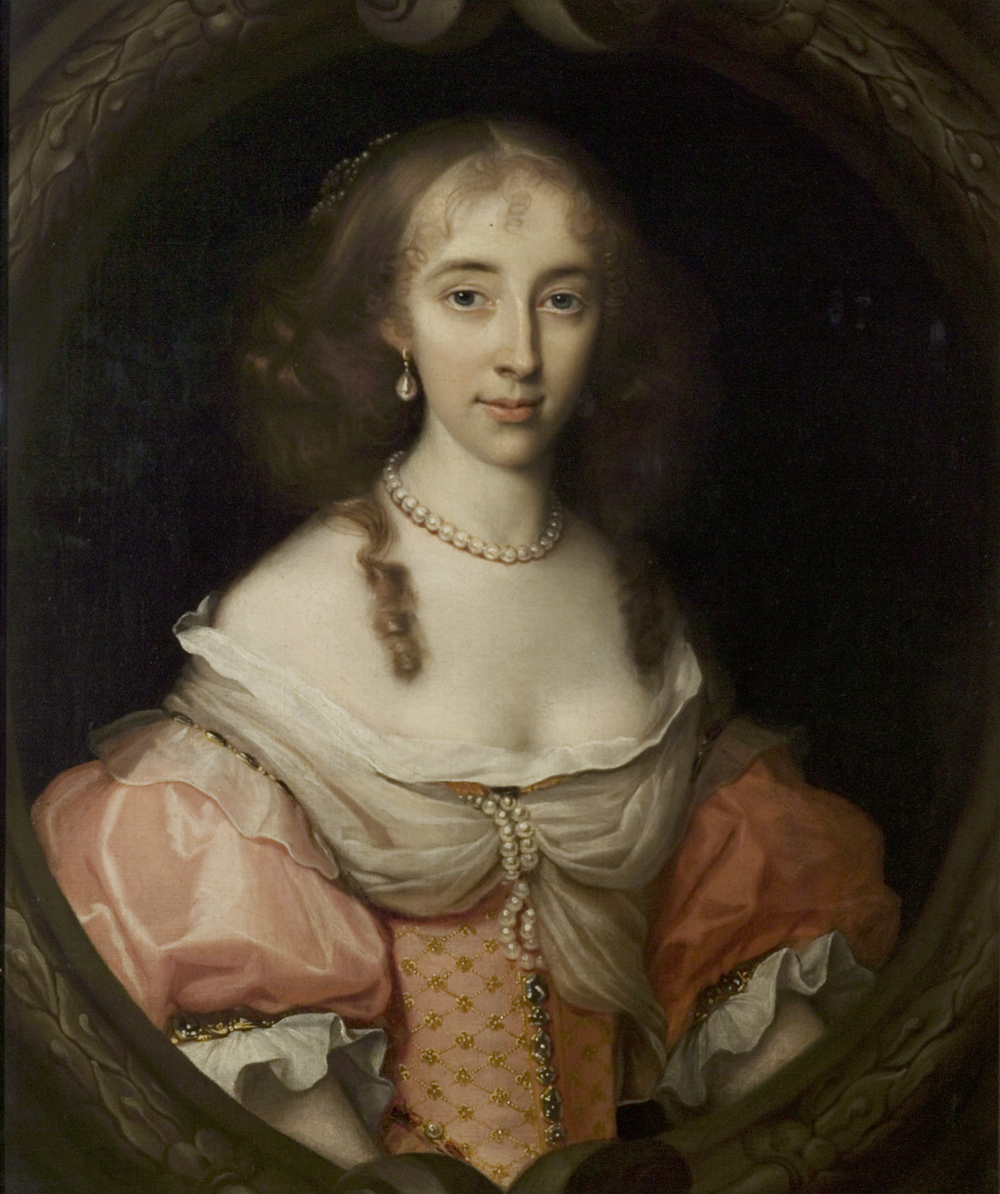
Portrait of his eldest surviving daughter, Magdalen, Lady Burdett, by John Michael Wright

In 1627 Aston married to Magdalene Pulteney (d. 1635), a daughter of Sir John Pulteney of Misterton. Before her death in 1635, they had two sons and two daughters, all of whom died young. Magdalene is remembered because of the painting that he commissioned from John Souch showing him by her deathbed. In the painting, Aston is shown wearing a pendant commemorating the loss of his son Robert (d. 1634); on 19 April 2026, The Guardian reported that the pendant in the painting had been rediscovered when its current owners viewed the painting while visiting the Manchester Art Gallery.

=== Second marriage ===
In 1639 Aston married Anne Willoughby (1614–1688), the daughter of Sir Henry Willoughby, 1st Baronet and, his first wife, Elizabeth Knollys (a daughter of the privateer Sir Henry Knollys and Margaret Cave). Together, they had two daughters and one son:

- Sir Willoughby Aston, 2nd Baronet (1640–1702), who married Mary Offley, a daughter of John Offley (grandfather of John Offley Crewe).
- Magdalen Aston (1642–1694), who married, as his second wife, Sir Robert Burdett, 3rd Baronet in 1676.
- Mary Aston, who married Michael Biddulph of Polesworth in 1695.

Sir Thomas died at Stafford on 24 March 1645, aged 44. He was succeeded in his baronetcy by his only surviving son, Willoughby. After his death, his widow married Hon. Anchitell Grey, MP for Derby and second son of Henry Grey, 1st Earl of Stamford, before her own death in 1688.

Parliament of England
| Parliament suspended since 1629 | Member of Parliament for Cheshire; 1640; With: Sir William Brereton, 1st Baronet | Succeeded by Sir William Brereton, 1st Baronet; Peter Venables |
Baronetage of England
| New creation | Baronet (of Aston); 1628–1645 | Succeeded by Willoughby Aston |
