= Sir John Willoughby, 4th Baronet =

British politician (1799–1866)

Sir John Willougby Bt

Member of Parliament for Leominster
- In office 27 March 1857 – 22 October 1858 Serving with Gathorne Hardy
- Preceded by: Gathorne Hardy; John George Phillimore
- Succeeded by: Gathorne Hardy; Charles Bateman-Hanbury

Personal details
- Born: 21 April 1799 Baldon House, Oxfordshire
- Died: 15 September 1866 (aged 67) Fulmer Hall, Buckinghamshire
- Party: Conservative
- Spouse(s): Elizabeth Hawkes (m. 1854) Eliza Kennedy (m. 1822; died 1852)
- Parent: Christopher Willoughby

Sir John Pollard Willoughby, 4th Baronet (21 April 1799 – 15 September 1866) was a British Conservative politician and civil servant.

== Early life and family ==
Born at Baldon House, Marsh Baldon, Oxfordshire, Willoughby was the son of Christopher Willoughby, and was educated at Merchant Taylors' School from 1809 to 1812. After a short break at sea, he then enrolled at the Haileybury College from 1815 to 1818.

Willoughby then entered the Bombay Civil Service in 1818, and was appointed assistant resident at Baroda in 1820. He married Eliza Kennedy, daughter of Colonel Michael Kennedy—a member of the Bombay Presidency army—in 1822, and then became a political agent at Kathiawar from 1828 until 1835, when he became Chief Secretary to the Government of Bombay until 1846. After this, he was a member of the Bombay Legislative Council until 1851.

He then returned to England, where, after the death of Eliza in 1852, he remarried to Elizabeth Hawkes, daughter of Thomas Hawkes MP, of Himley House, Staffordshire, in 1854. In the same year, he became a member of the Court of Directors, and held that role until 1858.

He had at least three children, Maria Martha (died 1871), Maria Gertrude (died 1939) and Mary Sophia (died 1853).

== Member of Parliament ==
Willoughby was elected Conservative MP for Leominster at the 1857 general election and held the seat until 1858 when he resigned after he was appointed member of the Council of India.

== Baronetcy ==
He became the 4th Baronet of Baldon House on 23 March 1865, upon the death of his brother, Henry Willoughby, but died the next year. The title was passed to John Christopher Willoughby.

== Philanthropy ==
The gift of £420 to defray the cost of a new lifeboat was received from Sir John Willougby by the Royal National Lifeboat Institution (RNLI) in April 1866. The lifeboat was to be named Oxfordshire after his native county, and his approval was received for the funds to be appropriated to a new lifeboat station at Looe in Cornwall. The lifeboat served for 16 years, launching 14 times, and saving 14 lives.

Parliament of the United Kingdom
Preceded by John George Phillimore; Gathorne Hardy	Member of Parliament for Leominster; 1857–1858; With: Gathorne Hardy	Succeeded by Gathorne Hardy; Charles Bateman-Hanbury
Baronetage of Great Britain
Preceded by Henry Willoughby	Baronet (of Baldon House); 1865–1866	Succeeded by John Christopher Willoughby
