= Prescott baronets of Theobald's Park (1794) =

Escutcheon of the Prescott baronets of Theobald's Park

The Prescott baronetcy, of Theobalds Park in the County of Hertford, was created in the Baronetage of Great Britain on 9 December 1794 for George William Prescott, son of George Prescott (c.1711 – 1790), MP, of Theobalds Park, and his wife Mary, daughter of Jacob Elton, a merchant and Mayor of Bristol, third son of Sir Abraham Elton, 1st Baronet. He had married in 1774 Susanna Long, daughter of Beeston Long (1710–1785) the elder of Carshalton Park, a West Indies merchant with Drake & Long, and father of Beeston Long the younger and the politician Charles Long.

The title became extinct on the death of the 7th Baronet in 1959.

== Prescott baronets, of Theobald's Park (1794) ==
- Sir George William Prescott, 1st Baronet (1748–1801)
- Sir George Beeston Prescott, 2nd Baronet (1775–1840)
- Sir George William Prescott, 3rd Baronet (1800–1850)
- Sir George Rendlesham Prescott, 4th Baronet (1846–1894)
- Sir George Lionel Lawson Bagot Prescott, 5th Baronet (1875–1942)
- Sir Charles William Beeston Prescott, 6th Baronet (1877–1955)
- Sir William Villiers Leonard Prescott-Westcar, 7th Baronet (1882–1959), left no heir.

== Notes ==
Baronetage of Great Britain
Preceded by Willoughby baronets	Prescott baronets of Theobald's Park; 9 December 1794	Succeeded by Stephens baronets
