= John Souch =

English painter

John Souch (1593/4–1645) was an English painter who specialised in portrait painting. He flourished in the early seventeenth century in the North West of England, and perhaps epitomises the role of art in English local life at that time.

== Early life ==
John Souch was baptised on 3 February 1593/4 at Ormskirk, Lancashire In 1607, he was apprenticed (at the age of fourteen) for a term of ten years to Randle Holme I, the Chester Herald painter and antiquary. In 1600 and again in 1606 Holme had been appointed a deputy herald of the College of Arms in Cheshire, Lancashire and North Wales. A Herald Painter usually had a workshop in which all manner of heraldic devices and coats of arms were created for status conscious local gentry and nobility. These would be painted on boards for display on special occasions. A hatchment, a lozenge shaped board, would be carried at a funeral and then hung above the tomb.

However, the more talented herald painters sometimes branched out into portraiture, to satisfy a growing market for images to record betrothals, births, and (sometimes) deaths. Souch was clearly gifted in this direction, and consequently prospered under Holme's tutelage. He became a Freeman of the City of Chester in 1616, when he was twenty three. Painters in Chester, as elsewhere in England at the time, were regarded as craftsmen. Consequently, he became a member of the Chester Painters and Stationers Company, a painters' Guild that met in the upper room of the Phoenix Tower or King Charles Tower on the city walls.

Although based in Chester, he became, after the manner of the time, a peripatetic painter, travelling to client's houses within an area bounded by Shropshire to the South and Yorkshire to the North, and undertaking commissions, either heraldic or portraiture, on the spot. The first record of him working as an artist was in 1620, when he was paid 30 shillings, probably for a portrait of Francis Clifford, 4th Earl of Cumberland for painting his portrait at Skipton Castle. This portrait might be the same as the portrait of Francis Clifton, now at Hardwick Hall.

== Style of painting ==
In common with many of his contemporaries, Souch adopted a two dimensional style, in which linear form and decoration were to the fore, rather than modelling, depth, or perspective. In fact the portraiture of the time can be said to be iconic rather than realistic. However, under the influence of Dutch and German painters active in London and elsewhere, this approach was starting to change. Souch himself may have undertaken artistic training in the Netherlands at some stage in his career, and some art historians claim to have detected the influence of Cornelis Jonson van Ceulen. In any case, his natural talent and sympathy for the subject seems to place him apart from other itinerant painters. Nevertheless, after the arrival of Anthony van Dyck in England, Souch clung to an older, Elizabethan, tradition of painting.

== Paintings ==
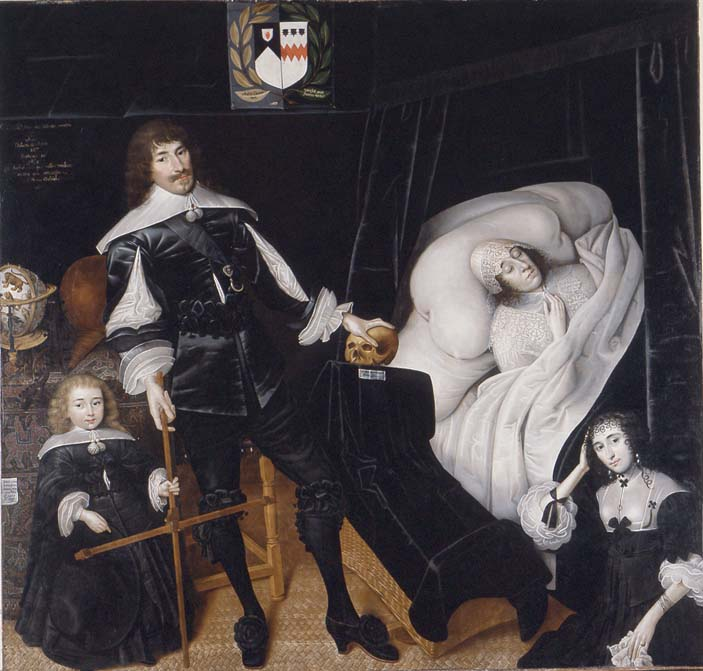
Souch's painting of Sir Thomas Aston at the deathbed of his wife

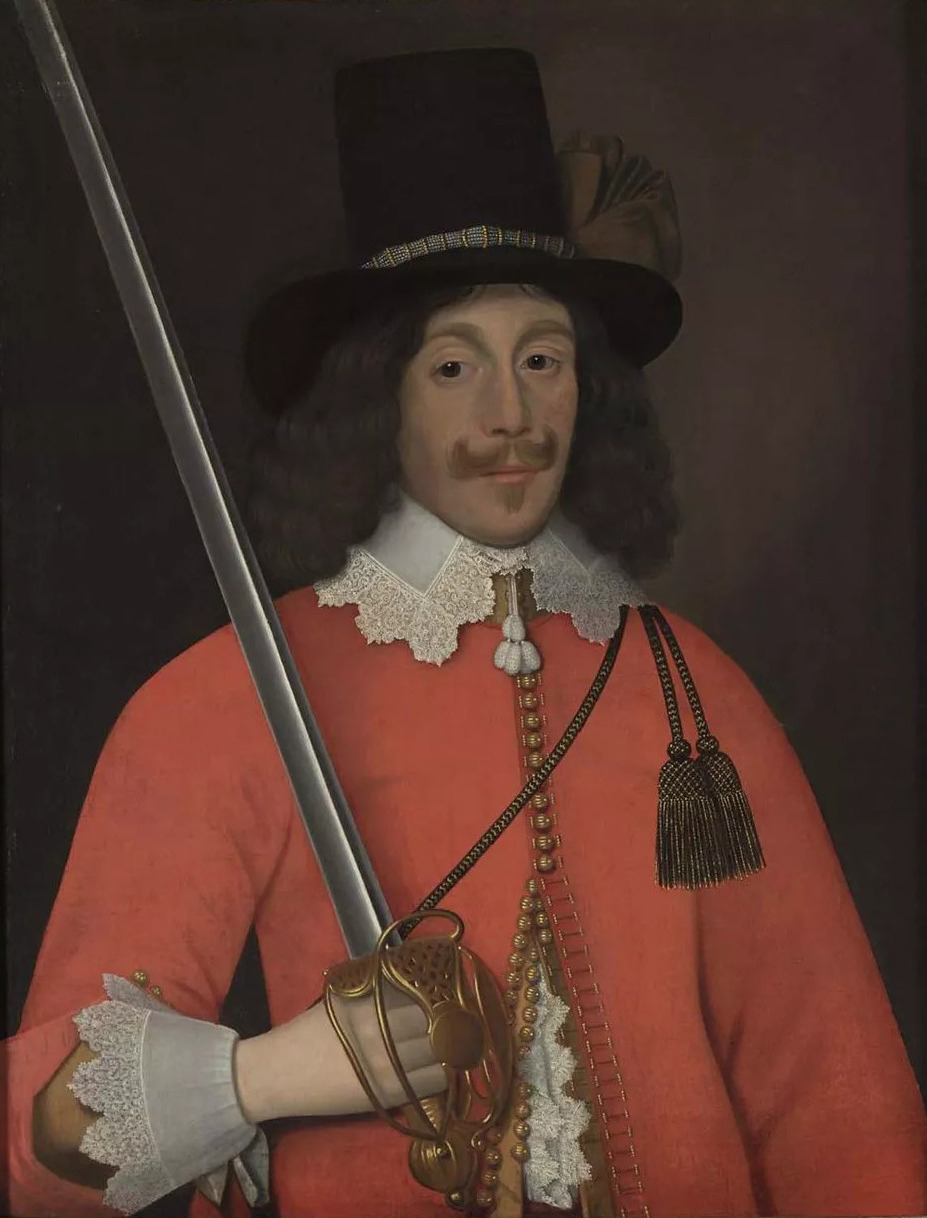
c. 1643 portrait of John Hutchinson by Souch

Few authenticated works survive, though several are attributed to him.

A portrait of George Puleston of Emral Park, near Wrexham, may be found in the Tate Gallery, London.

There is a fine betrothal or wedding portrait, Unknown Lady and Gentleman, and signed 'J.S. Fec.1640' at the Grosvenor Museum, Chester. (In this picture, the lady holds a tulip, a motif redolent of Dutch folk art, perhaps suggesting a visit to the Netherlands by the artist.)

Souch's masterpiece is undoubtedly Sir Thomas Aston at the Deathbed of his Wife, a painting of Sir Thomas Aston, 1st Baronet and family attending his dying wife. It is part of Manchester Art Gallery collection. In the painting, Aston wears a commemorative pendant of his son Robert who died in 1634; on 19 April 2026, The Guardian reported that the pendant in the painting had been rediscovered when its current owners viewed the painting while visiting the Manchester Art Gallery.

== Later life ==
Souch continued his association with the Chester Guild, which records him as 'mort' (dead) in 1645. It is possible that Souch, like Randle Holme, his master, was a royalist supporter, and had died in Chester as a consequence of the siege by the parliamentary army.

== Literature ==
- Turner J. (Editor). (2003). The Grove Dictionary of Art. Oxford University Press. ISBN 0-19-517068-7
- Treuherz J. (1997), New light on John Souch of Chester, Burlington Magazine, May, pp. 300–305.
