= Roger Allestry =

17th-century English politician

Roger Allestry (ca. 1620 – 1 February 1665) was an English politician who sat in the House of Commons from 1660 to 1665.

Allestry was the son of Thomas Allestry of Alvaston, Derbyshire and his second wife Constance Isley. He was a commissioner for assessment at Derby in 1657 and from 1660 until his death. He was also town clerk from January 1660 and commissioner for the peace from 1661.

In 1660 Allestry was elected member of parliament for Derby and was re-elected without contest in 1661 for the Cavalier Parliament. He held the seat until his death in 1665.

Allestry married Sarah Bradshaw, daughter of William Bradshaw of Derby on 28 September 1637. Their son William was also MP for Derby.

Parliament of England
Preceded by Nathanel Hallowes	Member of Parliament for Derby; 1660–1665; With: John Dalton	Succeeded by John Dalton; Anchitell Grey
