= Knyvett baronets =

Extinct baronetcy in the Baronetage of England

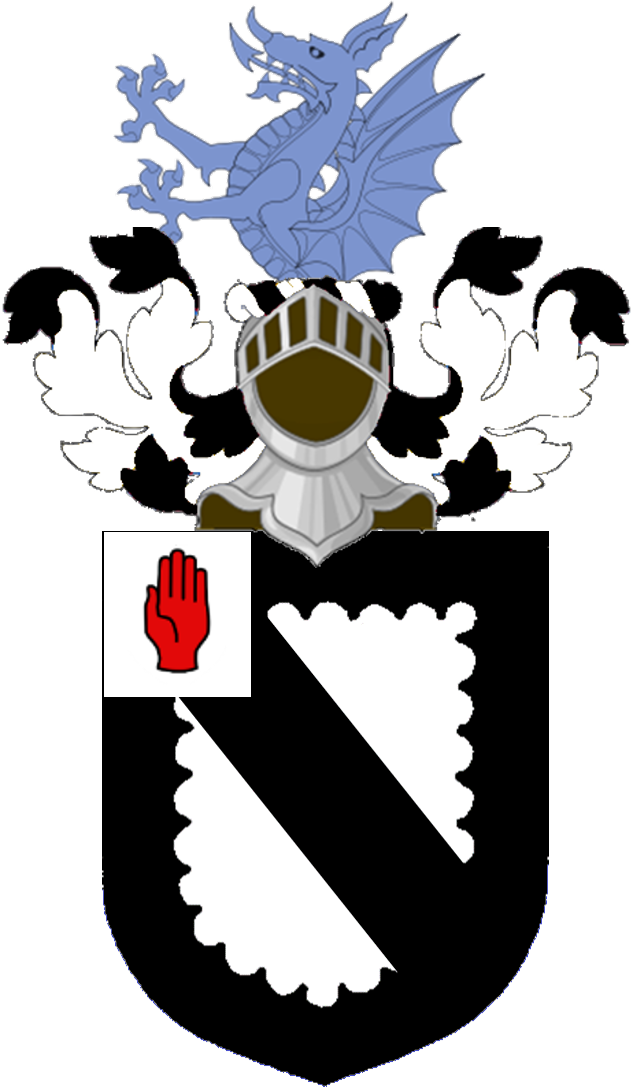
Arms: Argent a Bend Sable a Bordure engrailed of the last; Crest: A Demi Dragon winged Azure

The Knyvett Baronetcy, of Buckenham in the County of Norfolk, was a title in the Baronetage of England. It was created on 22 May 1611 for Philip Knyvett. The title became extinct on the death of the second Baronet in 1699.

The family seat was Buckenham Castle, Buckenham, Norfolk.

== Knyvett baronets, of Buckenham (1611) ==
- Sir Philip Knyvett, 1st Baronet (died 1655)
- Sir Robert Knyvett, 2nd Baronet (died 1699)

Baronetage of England
Preceded by Aston baronets	Knyvett baronets 22 May 1611	Succeeded by Shelley baronets
