= Sir Philip Stephens, 1st Baronet =

British politician

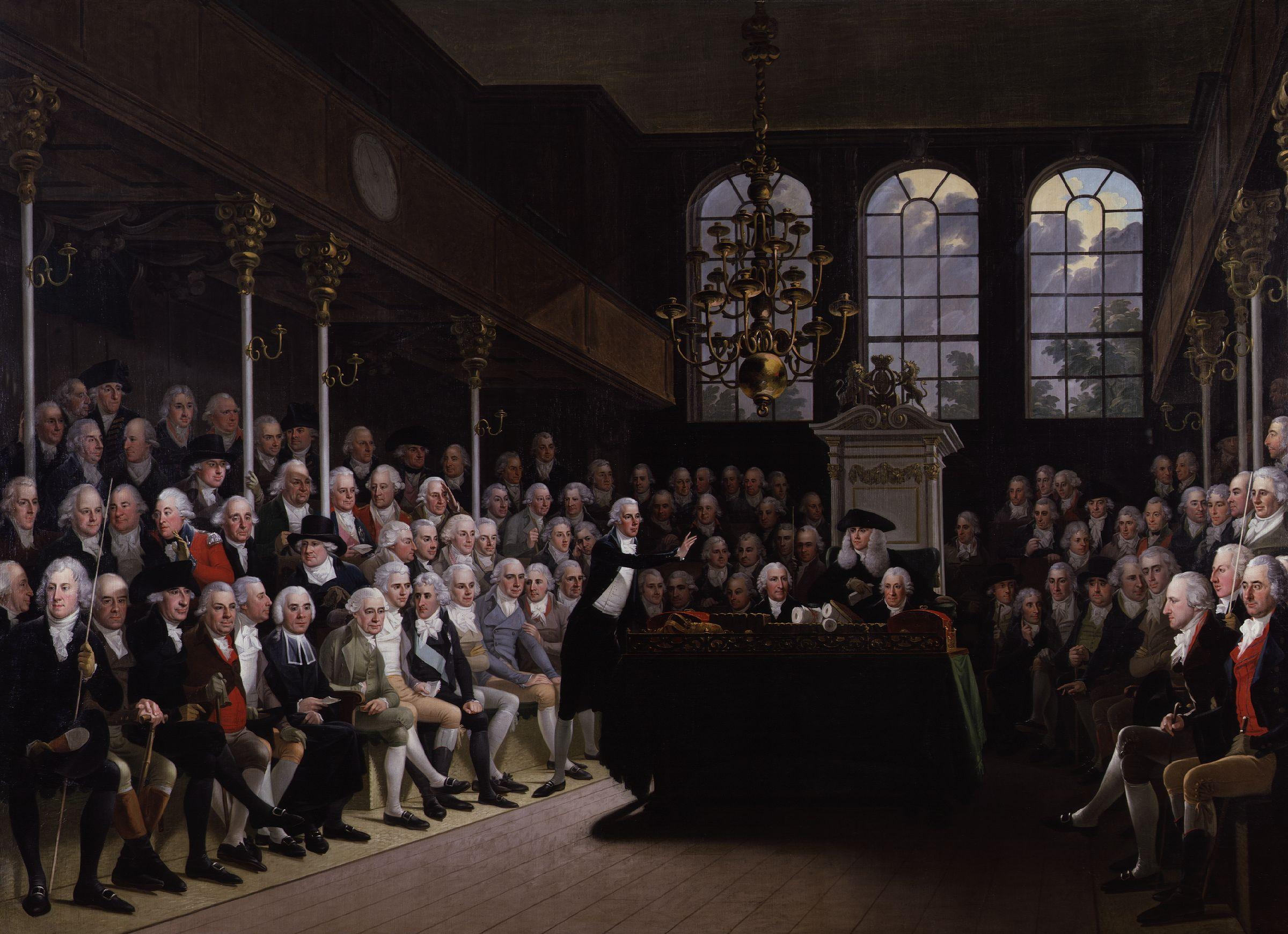
The House of Commons 1793-94, by Karl Anton Hickel (died 1798), given to the National Portrait Gallery, London in 1885.

Sir Philip Stephens, 1st Baronet (11 October 1723 – 20 November 1809) was a British politician who sat in the House of Commons for 47 years from 1759 to 1806, when he was the last surviving Member of Parliament to have served under George II. In the late 18th century, he was First Secretary of the Admiralty and later a Lord Commissioner of the British Admiralty between 1795 and 1806. He was a friend of Captain James Cook and the Pacific atoll of Caroline Island is named for his daughter. Stephens Island in British Columbia and Port Stephens in New South Wales were named for him.

== Life ==
Philip Stephens was descended from a family settled for many generations at Eastington in Gloucestershire. He was the youngest son of Nathaniel Stephens, rector of Alphamstone in Essex, and was born there. He was educated at the free school at Harwich, and at an early age obtained an appointment as clerk in the navy victualling office, as his eldest brother, Tyringham Stephens, had previously done.

After his return from his voyage round the world, Rear-admiral George Anson (afterwards Lord Anson) took notice of young Stephens, and had him moved to the admiralty. Stephens afterwards served as Anson's secretary, and was appointed assistant secretary of the admiralty. In 1763 he became secretary, and so continued for upwards of thirty years. He was elected a Fellow of the Royal Society on 6 June 1771, and from 1768 to 1806 he represented Sandwich in the House of Commons, eventually becoming Father of the House.

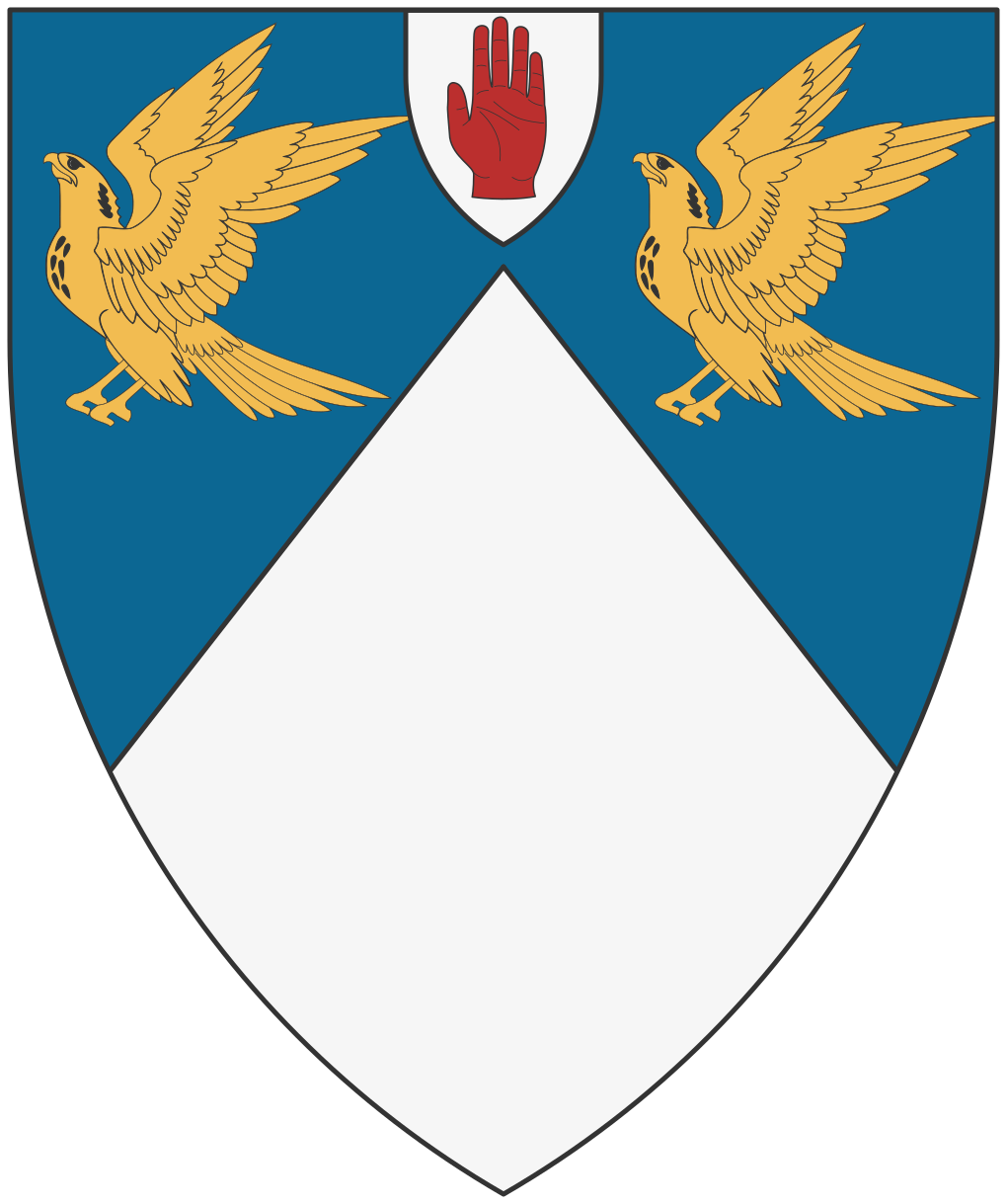
Arms of Stephens of St Faith's

In 1795 he applied for permission to resign his office at the admiralty, and was then, 17 March, created a baronet and appointed one of the lords of the admiralty. By a special recommendation on 15 October 1806 Stephens, at the age of eighty-one, was granted a pension of £1,600, which he enjoyed till his death on 20 November 1809. He was buried in Fulham church.

His only son, Captain Thomas Stephens, was killed in a duel at Margate in 1790; and his nephew, Colonel Stephens Howe, who was included in the patent of baronetcy, predeceased him. The baronetcy thus became extinct. An elder brother, Nathaniel Stephens, died a captain in the navy in 1747; and two nephews, also captains in the navy, William and Tyringham Howe, died in 1760 and 1783 respectively. Sir Philip's (illegitimate) only daughter, Caroline Elizabeth, married Thomas Jones, 6th Viscount Ranelagh in 1804, but died in childbirth the next year without surviving issue; she was buried in the same vault in Fulham church. With no living descendants, Sir Philip bequeathed his entire estate to Viscount Ranelagh.

== Career ==
During his 32 years as Secretary to the Admiralty, Stephens was one of the most powerful men in Britain. He was operating at a time of intense Anglo-French rivalry following Britain's success in the Seven Years' War, through France's revanche in the American Revolutionary War and on into the French Revolution. He sent out a cavalcade of navigators to explore the Pacific Ocean, including John Byron, James Cook, William Bligh and George Vancouver.

== Notes ==
Parliament of Great Britain
Preceded by Edmund Nugent; Philip Stanhope	Member for Liskeard; 1759–1768; With: Philip Stanhope 1759–61; Anthony Champion 1761–68	Succeeded by Edward Eliot; Samuel Salt
Preceded by The Viscount Conyngham; George Hay	Member for Sandwich; 1768–1801; With: The Viscount Conyngham 1768–74; William Hey 1774–76; Charles Brett 1776–80; Sir Richard Sutton, Bt 1780–84; Charles Brett 1784–90; Sir Horatio Mann 1790–1801	Succeeded by Parliament of the United Kingdom
Parliament of the United Kingdom
Preceded by Parliament of Great Britain	Member for Sandwich; 1801–1806; With: Sir Horatio Mann	Succeeded by Sir Horatio Mann; Thomas Fremantle
Preceded by William Drake	Father of the House; 1796–1806	Succeeded by Clement Tudway
Baronetage of Great Britain
New creation	Baronet (of Horsford); 1795–1809	Extinct
Preceded by Prescott baronets	Stephens baronets of Horsford; 13 March 1795	Succeeded by Chetwynd baronets
