= Sir Willoughby Aston, 2nd Baronet =

English baronet (1640-1702)

Sir Willoughby Aston, 2nd Baronet JP DL (5 July 1640 – 14 December 1702) was an English baronet.

== Early life ==
Aston was born on 5 July 1640. He was the only surviving son of Sir Thomas Aston, 1st Baronet, who fought for the Royalist cause in the English Civil War, and, his second wife, Anne Willoughby (1614–1688). After his father's death, his mother married Hon. Anchitell Grey, MP for Derby and second son of Henry Grey, 1st Earl of Stamford, From his parents' marriage, he was brother to Magdalen Aston (who married Sir Robert Burdett, 3rd Baronet), and Mary Aston (who married Michael Biddulph of Polesworth).

His paternal grandparents were John Aston of Aston, Cheshire and Maud (née Needham) Aston (a daughter of Robert Needham Esq.). His maternal grandparents were Sir Henry Willoughby, 1st Baronet and Elizabeth Knollys (a daughter of the privateer Sir Henry Knollys and Margaret Cave).

At just six years old, he succeeded to his father's baronetcy upon the elder Aston's death in at a prison in Stafford in 1646. He inherited the Aston Hall estate from his father, which was then subject to sequestration by Parliament. His uncle John recovered and managed the estate until his death in 1650.

== Career ==
Sir Willoughby came of age in 1661, and built a new house on the Aston estate. He inherited his mother's estates at Stanford in the Vale in Berkshire (through his maternal grandmother, Elizabeth (née Knollys) Willoughby) and Kingsbury in Warwickshire on her death in 1688.

Aston served as High Sheriff of Cheshire from 1680 to 1681 and, again, from 1690 to 1691. He was a Justice of the Peace for Cheshire and Warwickshire, and a Deputy Lieutenant for Cheshire from 1672 to 1682, when he was removed from the Lieutenancy because of his support for the Duke of Monmouth. He was later reinstated in c. 1689, serving until his death in 1702.

== Personal life ==
In c. 1665, Aston was married to Mary Offley (1650–1712), a daughter of John Offley, Esq. of Madeley Manor, Staffordshire. Through her brother, she was an aunt to John Offley Crewe, MP for Cheshire who inherited the family estate at Madeley in 1688 upon the death of his father (Mary's brother), and, in 1711, also inherited Crewe Hall and other estates from his great-uncle, Sir John Crewe of Utkinton. Together, they were the parents of twenty-one children, eight sons and nine daughters who survived to adulthood, including:

- Sir Thomas Aston, 3rd Baronet (1666–1725), who married Catharine Widdrington, daughter of William Widdrington of Cheeseburn Grange, near Stamfordham, Northumberland, in 1703.
- John Aston (c. 1667–1710), a Captain in the Royal Navy; he died without issue.
- Willoughby Aston (c. 1668–1693), who married Elizabeth Lewin, in 1691.
- Mary Aston (1669–1734), who married Sir John Crewe of Utkinton Hall, Cheshire, 1698. After his death in 1711, she married Dr. Hugh Chamberlain of Alderton and Hinton, in 1713.
- Robert Aston (c. 1670–1721), a merchant in London; he married Elizabeth Whitcomb in 1688.
- Magdalen Aston (1672–1746), who married Thomas Norris of Speke, Lancashire, in 1695.
- Richard Aston (1675–1741), of Wadley, Berkshire; he married Elizabeth Warren, daughter of John Warren, Esq. of Oxfordshire.
- Elizabeth Aston (1676–1756), who died unmarried.
- Charlotte Aston (1679–1751), who married John Pickering of Thelwall, Cheshire, in c. 1695.
- Dorothy Aston (1681–1756), who died unmarried.
- Catherine Aston (b. 1685), who died unmarried.
- Arthur Aston, who died unmarried in Constantinople.
- Purefoy Aston (1690–1768), who married Henry Wright, Esq. of Mobberley, Cheshire, in 1712.
- Helena Aston (1691–after 1752), who married Capt. Thomas Pennington (later Legh) in 1720.
- Letitia Aston (b. 1693), who married Robert Jenks, Esq. of West Ham, Essex, in 1716.

Sir Willoughby died on 14 December 1702 and was buried at Aston, where he and his wife are commemorated by a monument with carving by Grinling Gibbons. His widow died 22 January 1712 and was also buried at Aston.

=== Descendants ===
Through his eldest son Thomas, he was a grandfather of eight granddaughters, including Catherine Aston (wife of Hon. Rev. Henry Hervey, fourth son of the 1st Earl of Bristol) and Margery Aston (wife of Gilbert Walmisley), and one grandson, Sir Thomas Aston, 4th Baronet (c. 1705–1744), MP for Liverpool and St Albans; he married Rebecca Shishe (a daughter of John Shishe of Greenwich, Kent) in 1736 but died without issue.

Through his second eldest surviving son Richard, he was a grandfather of Sir Willoughby Aston, 5th Baronet (c. 1715–1772), who married Elizabeth Pye, a daughter of Henry Pye of Faringdon House in Berkshire (now Oxfordshire). Her brother was Admiral Sir Thomas Pye.

Through his daughter Helena, he was a grandfather of Peter Legh (1723–1804), MP for Ilchester.

Baronetage of England
Preceded by Thomas Aston	Baronet (of Aston); 1646–1702	Succeeded by Thomas Aston
