= John Dalton (MP) =

English politician

John Dalton (c. 1610 – 30 August 1679) was an English politician who sat in the House of Commons between 1659 and 1679.

Dalton was the son of John Dalton, a vintner of Nottingham, and his wife Isabel. He settled at Derby where he became a draper. In 1645, he became an alderman of Derby and was mayor in 1646. He was mayor again in 1652. In 1657 he was commissioner for assessment for Derbyshire.

In 1659, Dalton was elected Member of Parliament for Derby in the Third Protectorate Parliament. In 1660, he was re-elected MP for Derby in the Convention Parliament. He was re-elected in 1661 as MP for Derby in the Cavalier Parliament and sat until 1679.

Dalton was the senior alderman of Derby when he died on a visit to Nottingham. He was buried in St Werburgh's chancel in Derby.

Dalton married Anne Pyott, daughter of Richard Pyott of Streetly, Staffordshire and had two sons.

Parliament of England
Preceded by Gervase Bennet	Member of Parliament for Derby; 1659; With: Gervase Bennet	Succeeded by Nathaniel Hallowes
Preceded by Nathaniel Hallowes	Member of Parliament for Derby; 1660–1679; With: Roger Allestry; Anchitell Grey	Succeeded by Anchitell Grey; George Vernon
