= John Christopher Willoughby, 5th Baronet =

British army officer and landowner

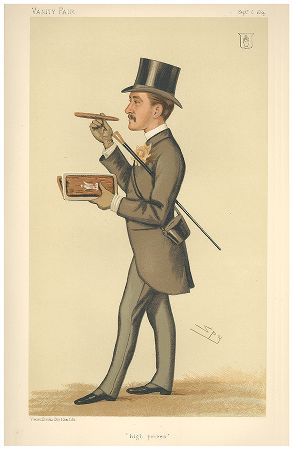
"high prices" Caricature of Sir John Christopher Willoughby, 5th Bart. by Spy in Vanity Fair, 6 September 1884

Sir John Christopher Willoughby, 5th Baronet DSO (20 February 1859 – 16 April 1918) was a British army officer, Justice of the Peace for Oxfordshire, and landowner of properties in Oxfordshire and Buckinghamshire.

After education at Eton and Trinity College, Cambridge, John Christopher Willoughby joined the 3rd (Royal Bucks Militia) Battalion, Oxfordshire Light Infantry, as a lieutenant in 1879. From the militia he secured a commission in the Regular Army as a 2nd lieutenant in the 6th Dragoon Guards and then transferred to the Royal Horse Guards in 1880.

He served in the Egyptian campaign in 1882 (awarded medal with clasp, and bronze star), in the Nile expedition in 1884–1885 (mentioned in despatches), and with the British South Africa Company's Force in Matabeleland in 1893. In South Africa in the Second Boer War from 1899 to 1900 he was present with Cavalry Headquarter Staff during the siege of Ladysmith and at the relief of Mafeking was appointed major, under General Hunter, in charge of Transport of Flying Column (mentioned in despatches and awarded a medal).

Willoughby served in World War I from 1914 to 1917 and was awarded DSO in 1917. He was ultimately major in command of the 1st Motor Battery of the Army Service Corps before his death aged 59 in April 1918. He was buried in Kensal Green Cemetery, London.

== Jameson Raid ==
In 1884 gold was discovered in the Transvaal. By the end of 1895 within the Transvaal there were approximately 60,000 non-Boer European men (mostly British and some with their families) and 30,000 male Boers. On 29 December 1895, the British South Africa Company sent an armed force of about 600 men, in 2 mounted columns, into the Transvaal against the South African Republic, which retained sovereignty from 1852 to 1902. The incursion is known in history as the Jameson raid (under the command of Leander Starr Jameson). John Christopher Willoughby was second in command and took command of the expedition when the two columns united northwest of Johannesburg on 30 December. The Jameson raiders skirmished against Boer resistance on 1 January and the next day were defeated and surrendered after losing approximately 30 men. The captured raiders were taken to Pretoria and jailed. The Boers later gave custody of the prisoners to the British for trial in London. Jameson was sentenced to 15 months and Willoughby was sentenced to 10 months.

== Baronetcy ==
He became, at age seven, the 5th Baronet of Baldon House in 1866, upon the death of his father, Sir John Willoughby, 4th Baronet. The baronetcy became extinct in 1918 upon his own death.

Baronetage of Great Britain
Preceded by John Willoughby	Baronet (of Baldon House); 1866–1918	Extinct
