= Looe Lifeboat Station =

RNLI lifeboat station in Cornwall, England

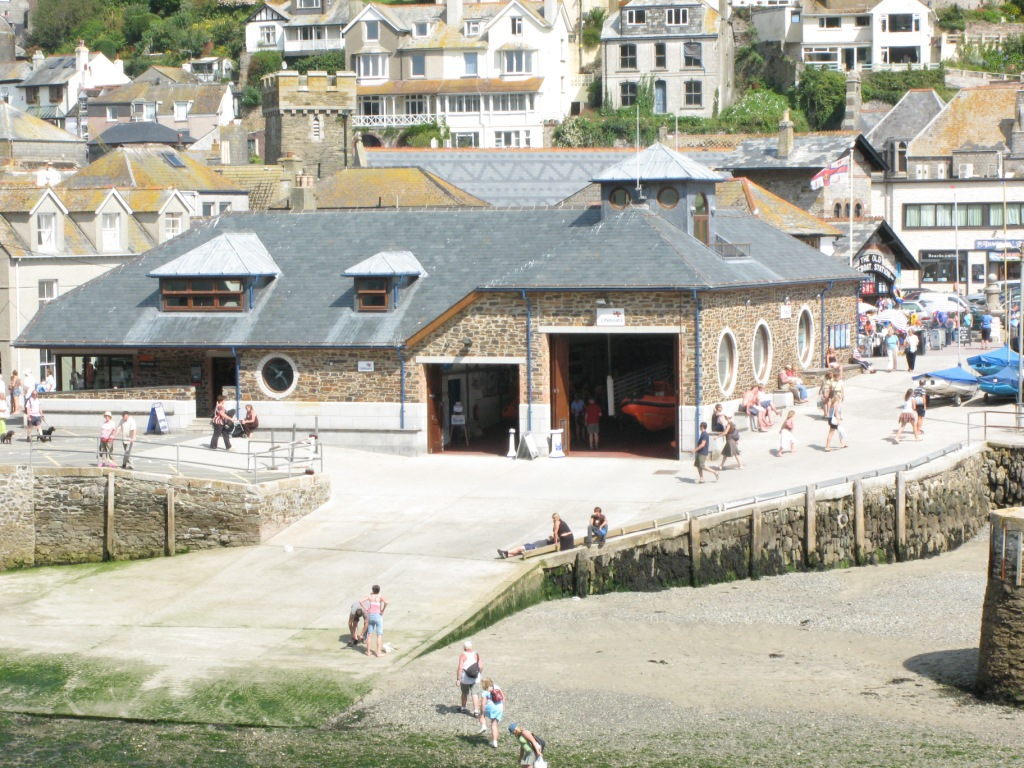
- Looe lifeboat station in 2007

- Location within Cornwall

General information
- Type: Lifeboat station
- Location: Albatross boathouse, Church End, East Looe, Cornwall, PL13 1AH, United Kingdom
- Coordinates: 50.3520°N 4.4532°W
- Opened: 28 December 1866
- Cost: 1866: £220; 2003: £750,000
- Owner: RNLI

Website
- Looe RNLI Lifeboat Station

Listed Building – Grade II
- Official name: Watch tower studio and former lifeboat shed
- Designated: 17 September 1973
- Reference no.: 1201098

Looe Lifeboat Station can be found on the east side of the River Looe at Chapel End in Looe, a seaside resort approximately 16 miles (26 km) west of Plymouth, at the western end of Whitsand Bay, on the south-east coast of the county of Cornwall, England.

A lifeboat station was established at Looe by the Royal National Lifeboat Institution (RNLI) in 1866, operating for 64 years until its closure in 1930. An Inshore lifeboat station was established in 1992.

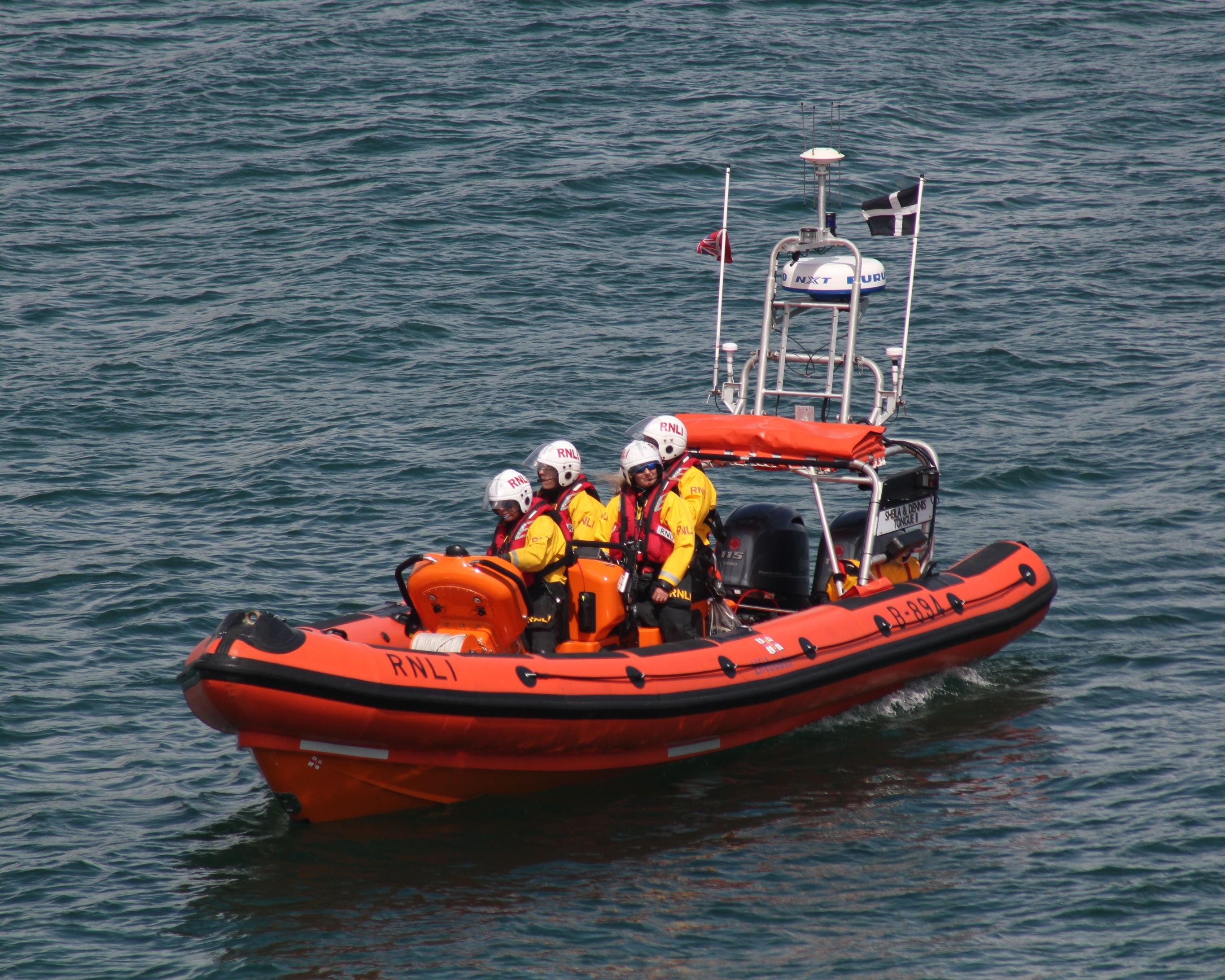
B-class (Atlantic 85) Inshore lifeboat Sheila & Dennis Tongue II (B-894)

The station currently operates a B-class (Atlantic 85) Inshore lifeboat, Sheila & Dennis Tongue II (B-894), on station since 2016, and the smaller D-class (IB1) Inshore lifeboat Ollie Naismith II (D-872), on station since 2022.

== History ==
To the east of Looe is the expanse of Whitsand Bay where many sailing ships became embayed, unable to sail around Rame Head to reach the safety of Plymouth Sound.

There were many wrecks in the Looe area before the lifeboat station was opened and the Coastguards made many rescues. 27 November 1838 saw the brig Belissima hit rocks near Looe Island. William Jennings swam out to the ship with a rope to save the crew of 13. He was awarded the silver medal by the Royal National Institution for the Preservation of Life from Shipwreck (the RNIPLS, as the RNLI was originally known). The French brig Fletan ran ashore sear Seaton in Whitsand Bay on 14 February 1851 but the nine people on board were saved by coastguards who waded into the sea with a rope. Another RNIPLS silver medal was awarded, this time to John Anderson.

At a meeting of the RNLI committee of management on Thursday 8 April 1866, the letter of 21 March was read from Sir John Pollard Willoughby, Bt., who had forwarded the gift of £420 towards the cost of a lifeboat and its equipment. At his request, the boat was to be named Oxfordshire, after his native county, and he approved the appropriation to a new station at Looe.

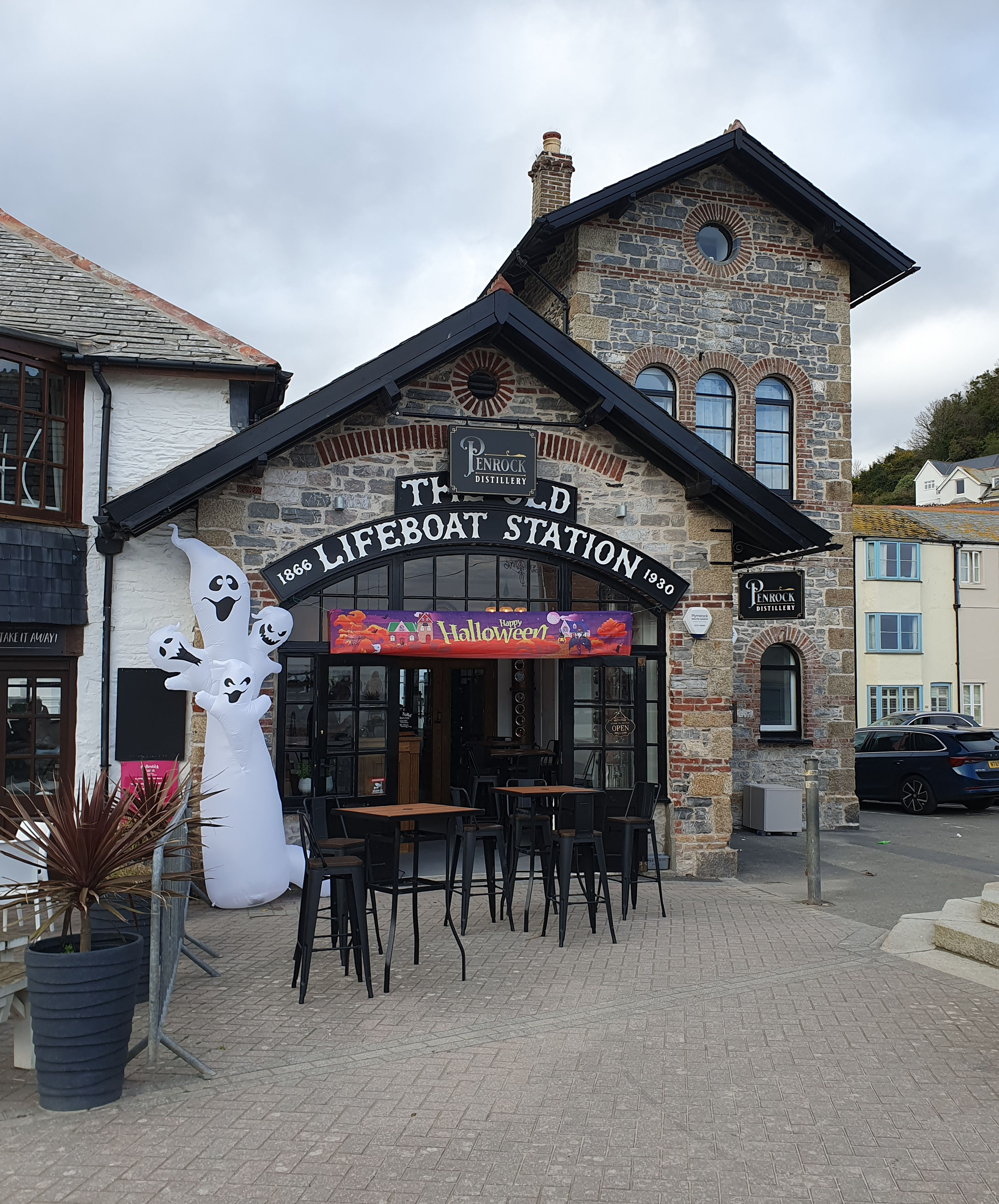
1866 boathouse

A 34-foot-long (10 m) self-righting 'Pulling and Sailing' (P&S) lifeboat was constructed by Woolfe of Shadwell, London, at a cost of £248, and forwarded along with its transporting and launching carriage to Liskeard by rail, conveyed at no charge, by the Great Western, Bristol and Exeter, South Devon and Cornwall Railway Companies.

The boat was then transported to Looe, where "The inhabitants were very desirous ...to have a life-boat - there being a large number of vessels frequently entering and quitting the harbour. There were plenty of fishermen available to form the crew; and, as every kind of co-operation was offered, the Society readily decided to establish a life-boat at Looe". After being paraded through the streets on 28 December 1866, the boat was taken to the new boathouse, which was "somewhat ornamental in character", built at a cost of £220. After being named Oxfordshire, the lifeboat was launched on demonstration.

Oxfordshire was launched on service 14 times, saving 14 lives. In 1882, a new lifeboat, again built by Woolfe, and one of two funded from donations made by the readers of the Boys' Own magazine. At a ceremony on 21 July, it was named Boys' Own No.1 (ON 45).

Boys' Own No.1 was launched to the aid of the French vessel Gypsy, which ran aground at Downderry on 7 December 1901. The lifeboat stood by for more than two hours while the ship's captain tried to pump out water. The crew eventually decided to abandon their ship. 14 were taken aboard the lifeboat, with five more taking to the ship's boat, which was towed to Looe. Three kittens on the Gypsy were also brought ashore. The French government awarded a gold medal, second class, to coxswain Edwards Toms, with silver medals, second class, to the rest of the crew.

The third and last P&S lifeboat at Looe arrived on 25 May 1902. The slightly larger 35 ft (11 m) lifeboat was built by Thames Ironworks of Blackwall, London, at a cost of £836, and was named Ryder (ON 489), funded from the legacy of Mr William Ryder of Brixton. The lifeboat had a reasonable record, launching 12 times, and saving 37 people, in her 28 years on station. However, in view of motor-powered lifeboats placed at Plymouth in 1926, and another at Fowey in 1928, at a meeting of the committee of management on 10 April 1930, it was decided to close Looe Lifeboat Station. Ryder (ON 489) was sold from service.

=== 1992 onwards ===
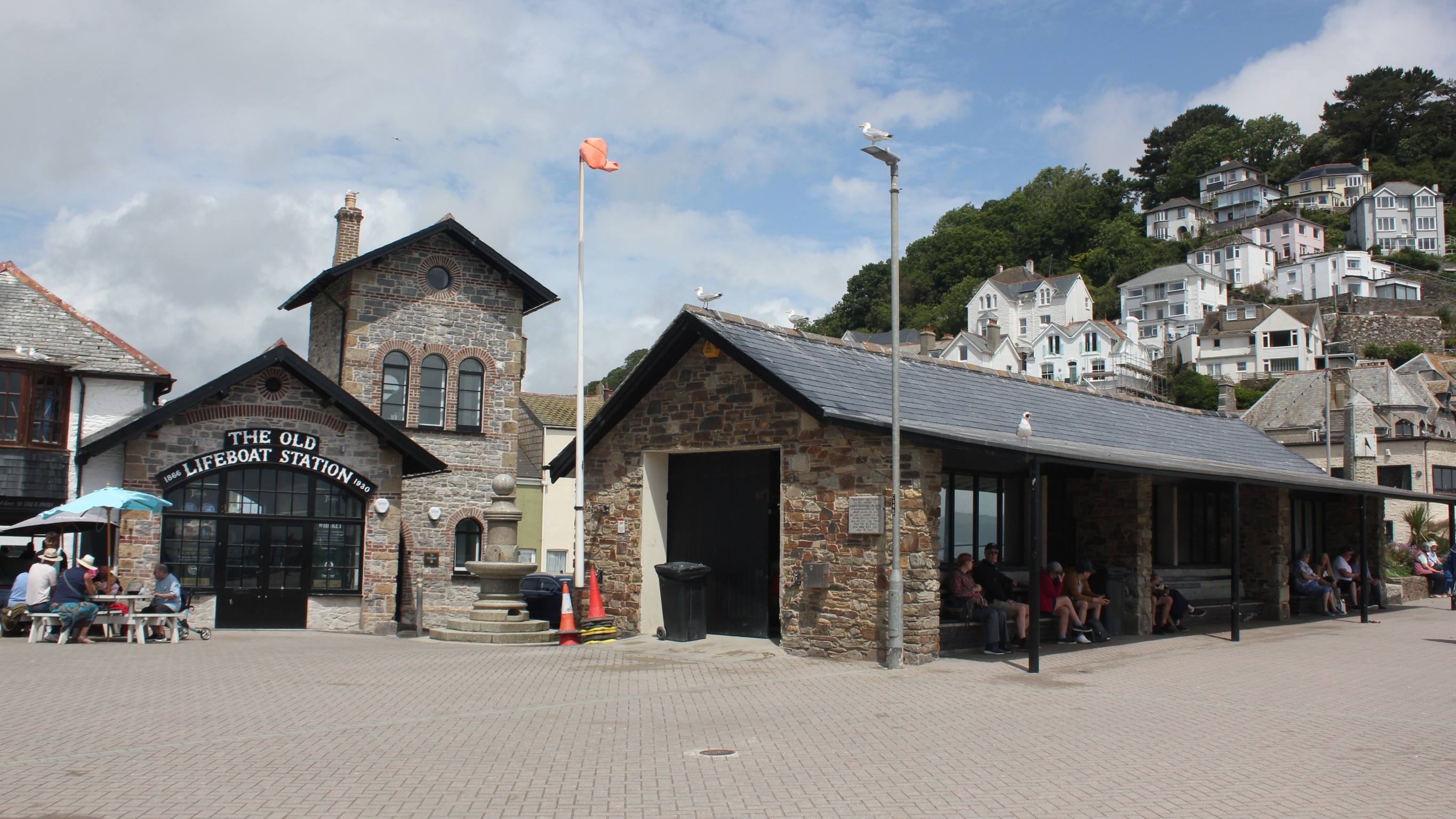
The old 1866 station with tower (left) and temporary 1992 station (right).

In 1964, in response to an increasing amount of water-based leisure activity, the RNLI placed 25 small fast Inshore lifeboats around the country. These were easily launched with just a few people, ideal to respond quickly to local emergencies.

More stations were opened gradually, but it was only on 27 November 1991 that the RNLI Committee of Management decided to place a D class lifeboat at Looe, for just one season on operational evaluation. A D-class (EA16) Inshore lifeboat (D-355) arrived on station on 15 June 1992. The boat was given temporary accommodation in the Beach shelter, belonging to the East Looe Town Trust, pictured to the right of the original lifeboat station.

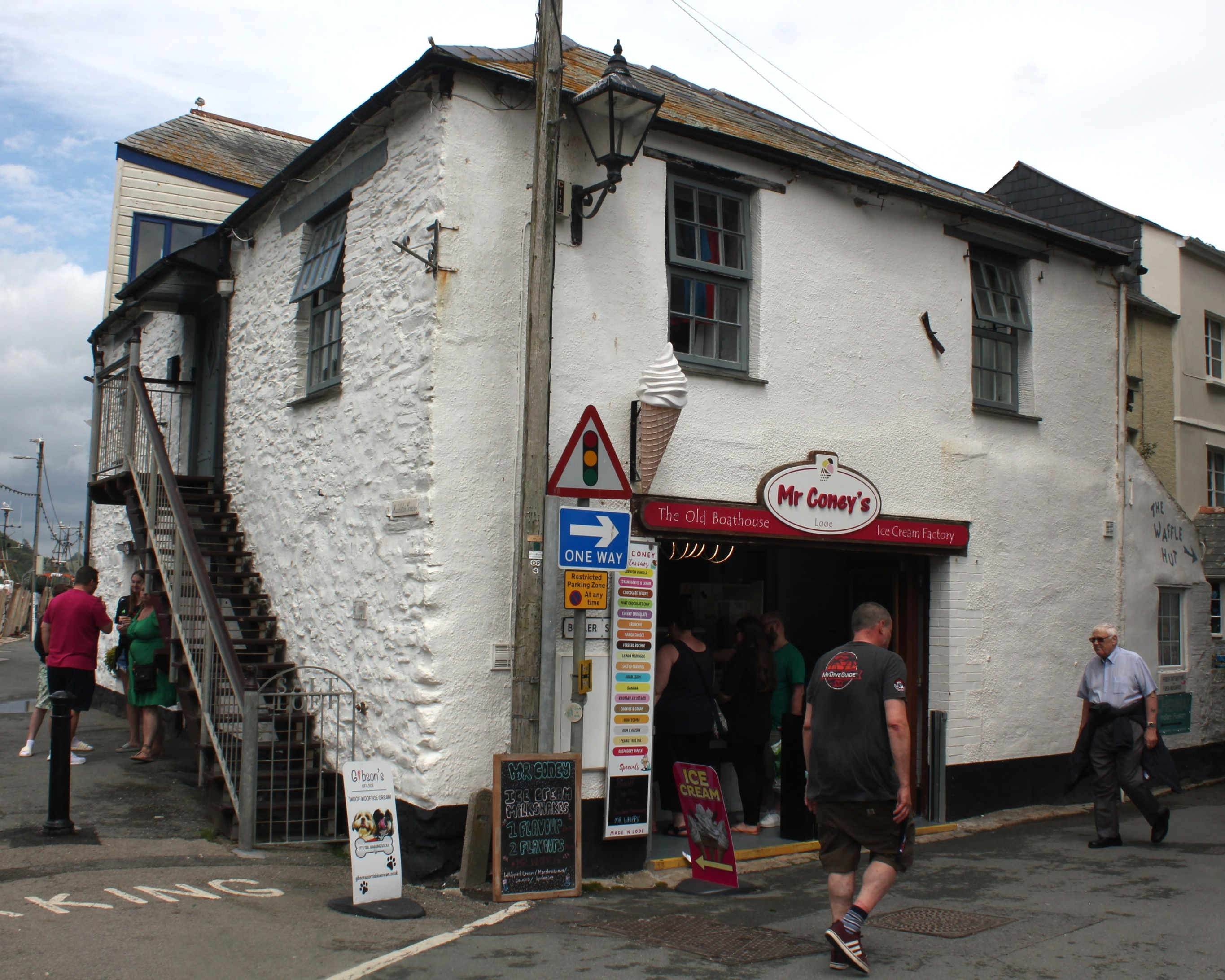
1998 East Quay boathouse, now an Ice Cream parlour

A permanent Inshore lifeboat, the D-class (EA16) Spirit of RAOC (D-461), was placed at Looe on 12 August 1994. However, the boathouse proved less than permanent, and had to be returned to the East Looe Town Trust. For a time, the lifeboat and kit were kept in two shipping containers. A property was acquired along East Quay, at Middleton Corner on Buller street, and after conversion, became the new lifeboat station on 11 June 1998, with the D-class lifeboat launched into the river via Davit.

However, it was soon decided to increase the Inshore lifeboat capability, and place a larger twin-engine Rigid inflatable B-class lifeboat at Looe. The small corner boathouse was now clearly too small, and a site was acquired on the sea-front, formerly the site of the Albatross net lofts, and latterly the home to a Miniature golf attraction.

A purpose-built lifeboat station, Albatross House, able to house both lifeboats, with up-to-date crew facilities and a souvenir shop, was constructed at a cost of £763,297, and opened on 18 October 2003. The B-class (Atlantic 75) Inshore lifeboat Alan and Margaret (B-793) was placed on service.

On reaching his 70th birthday on 30 October 2024, David Haines stood down from his role as Lifeboat Operations Manager. He joined the station in 1992, and has been a crew member, Launching Authority, and since 2004, Operations Manager. David John Haines was awarded the British Empire Medal in the 2025 New Year Honours, for services to maritime safety, and started a new role as chair of the Looe lifeboat management group.

== Description ==
The first boathouse stands close to the beach at East Looe. Because of its prominent position it was built in a decorative Italianate style. The walls are from granite rubble with red brick arches and string courses; the roof is slate. An assembly and reading room for the use of local sailors was provided above the boathouse with a two-storey tower on the east side. It was given listed building status in 1973.

The new building of 2003 also has granite walls and a slate roof to be in keeping with the old lifeboat station and other nearby buildings. The main building has crew facilities and space for the two inshore lifeboats with their tractors. There is a meeting room and office above the boat house, and a fund-raising shop attached on the north side. A new slipway was created at the same time to give a quick launch into the river.

== Station honours ==
The following are awards made at Looe:

- RNIPLS Silver Medal
  William Jennings, Commissioned Boatswain, H.M. Coastguard, Looe – 1838
  John Gurndsall Anderson, Chief officer, H.M. Coastguard, Downderry – 1851
- Gold Medal, 2nd class, awarded by The French Government
  Edward Toms, Coxswain – 1902
- Silver Medal, 2nd class, awarded by The French Government
  Albert Bettison, crew member – 1902
  Ernest Bettison, crew member – 1902
  Stephen Cox, crew member – 1902
  Joseph Fletcher, crew member – 1902
  Ben Menhenick, crew member – 1902
  Percy Pearn, crew member – 1902
  Ben Pengelly, crew member – 1902
  Thomas Pengelly, crew member – 1902
  Francis Taylor, crew member – 1902
  Charles Toms, crew member – 1902
  Thomas Toms, crew member – 1902
  Robert Whynall, crew member – 1902
- British Empire Medal
  David John Haines, Lifeboat Operations Manager, for 'services to maritime safety' – 2025KBH.

== Looe lifeboats ==
=== Pulling and Sailing (P&S) lifeboats ===
On station	ON (Note: ON is the RNLI's Official Number of the boat.)	Name	Built	Class	Comments
1866–1882	Pre-475	Oxfordshire	1866	34-foot Prowse Self-righting (P&S)	(Note: 32 ft 0 in (9.75 m) x 7 ft 6 in (2.29 m) (10-oared) Prowse-class self-righting (P&S) lifeboat, gift of Sir John Pollard Willoughby, Bt., built by Woolfe of Shadwell, London, costing £248.); Returned to London and broken up in 1882.
1882–1902	45	Boys' Own No.1	1882	34-foot Self-righting (P&S)	(Note: 34 ft 0 in (10.36 m) x 8 ft 0 in (2.44 m) (10-oared) self-righting (P&S) lifeboat, gift of the Boys' Own newspaper LB fund, built by Woolfe of Shadwell, London, costing £329.); Sold locally in 1902.
1902–1930	489	Ryder	1902	35-foot Self-righting (P&S)	(Note: 35 ft 0 in (10.67 m) x 8 ft 6 in (2.59 m) (10-oared) self-righting (P&S) lifeboat, legacy of Mr W. Ryder of Brixton, built by Thames Ironworks of Blackwall, London, costing £836.); Sold in 1930. Renamed Halmay III. and converted to a houseboat by 1958. It was wrecked in 1987 but rescued for preservation as Ryder, at Charlestown, Cornwall, August 2024.

Pre ON numbers are unofficial numbers used by the Lifeboat Enthusiast Society to reference early lifeboats not included on the official RNLI list.

=== Inshore lifeboats ===
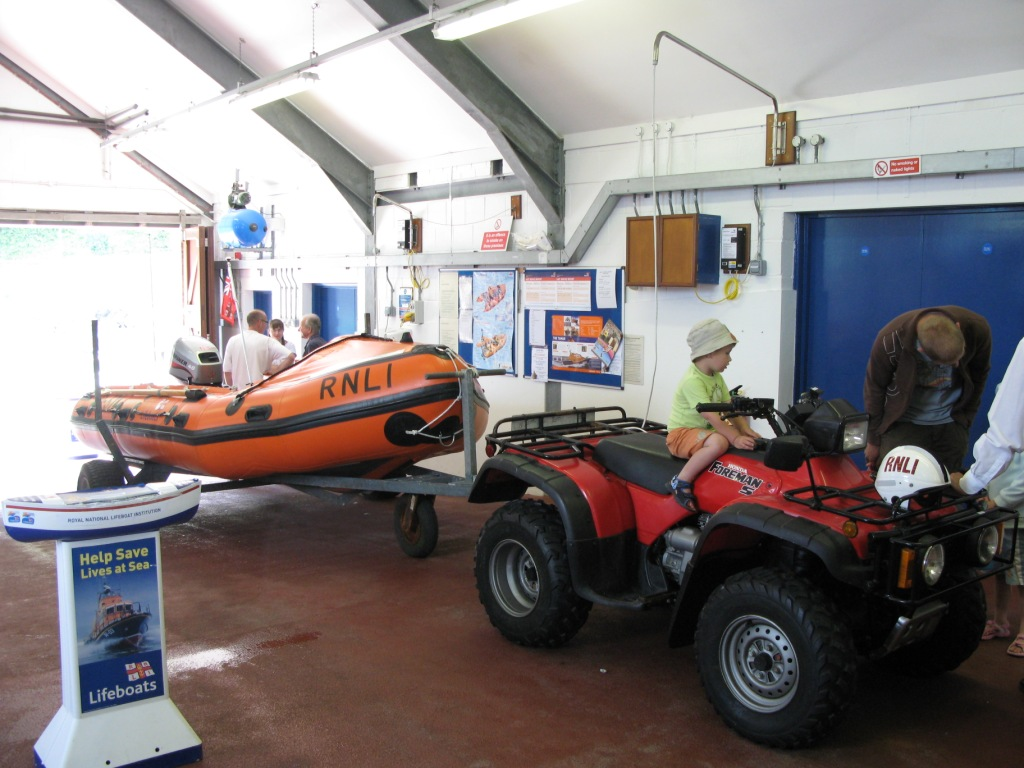
Regina Mary (D-574) 2002–2010

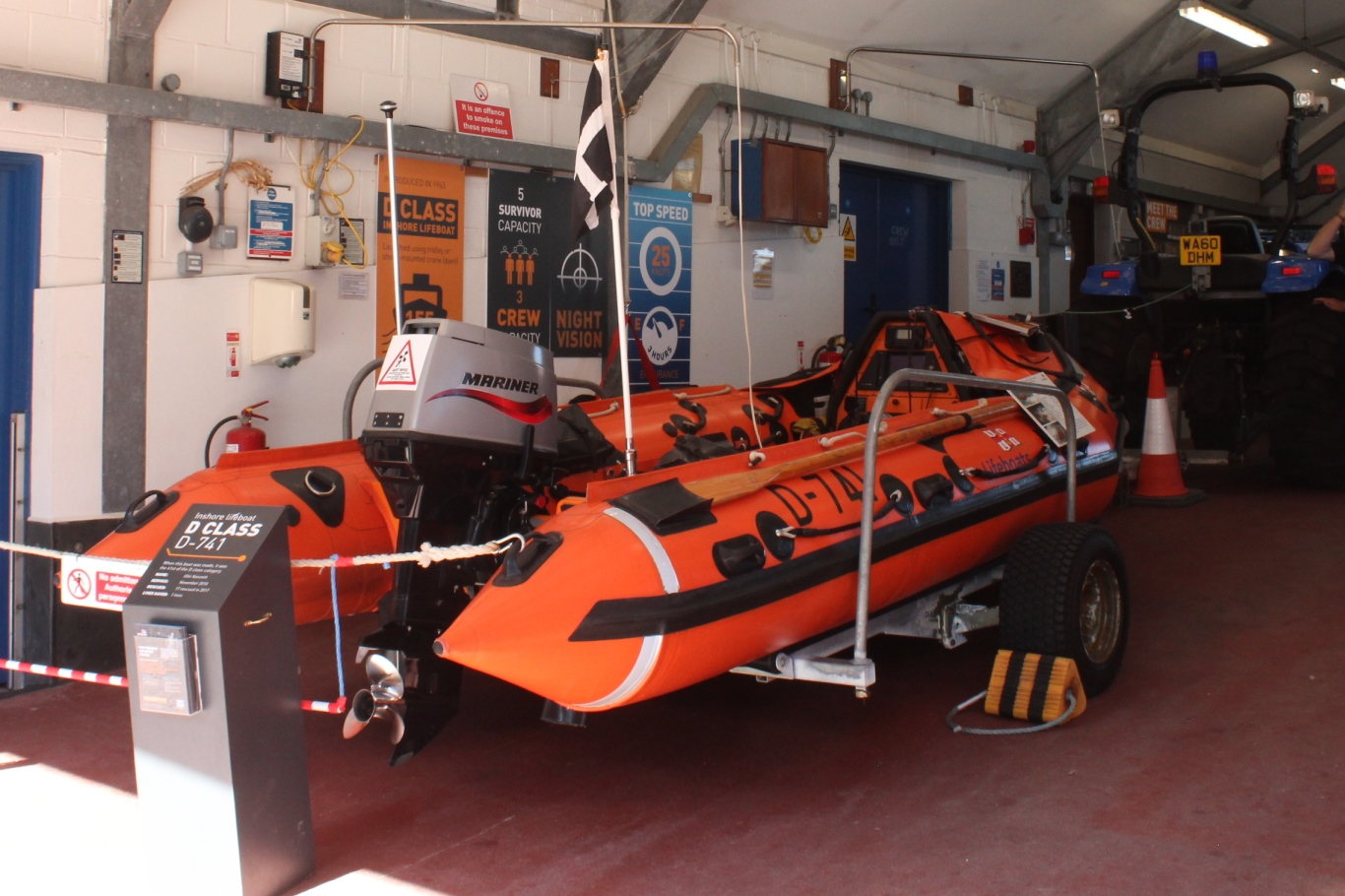
Ollie Naismith (D-741) 2010–2022

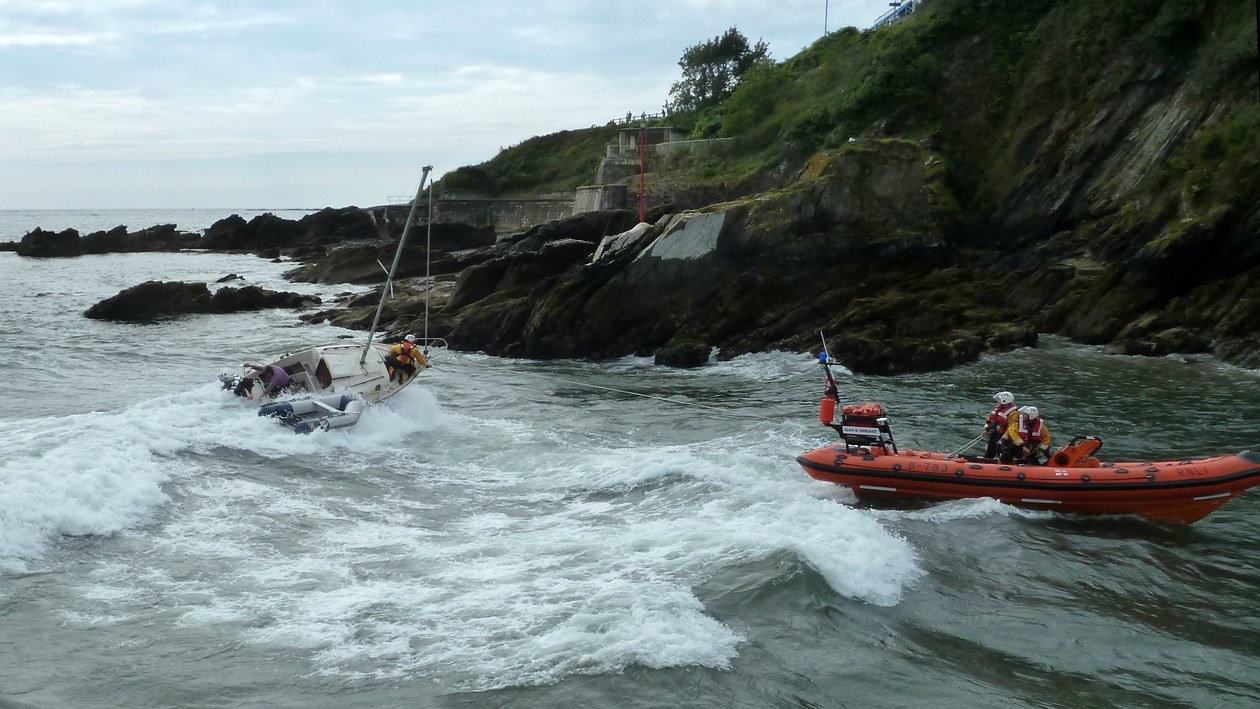
Alan and Margaret (B-793) 2003–2016

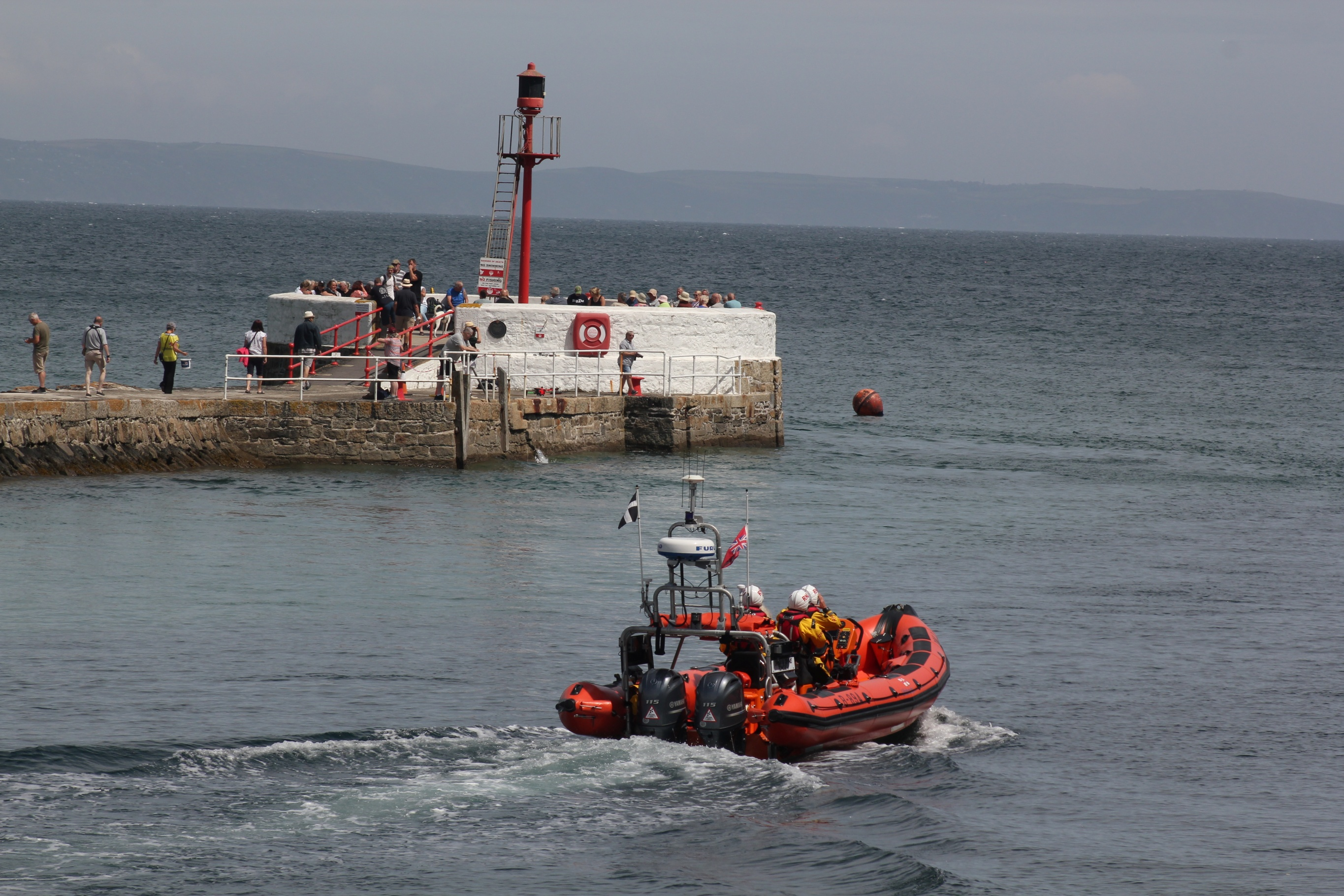
Sheila & Dennis Tongue II (B-894) 2016-present

==== D class ====
On station	Op.No. (Note: Op.No. is the RNLI's Operational Number of the boat carried on the hull.)	Name	Class	Comments
1992–1993	D-355	Unnamed	D-class (EA16)	Initially deployed as a relief lifeboat in 1988.
1994	D-396	Starting Point	D-class (EA16)	Initially deployed as a relief lifeboat in 1989.
1994–2002	D-461	Spirit of RAOC	D-class (EA16)	Later stationed at Workington and Anstruther.
2002–2010	D-574	Regina Mary	D-class (EA16)	
2010–2022	D-741	Ollie Naismith	D-class (IB1)	
2022–	D-872	Ollie Naismith II	D-class (IB1)	

==== B class ====
On station	Op.No.	Name	Class	Comments
2003–2016	B-793	Alan and Margaret	B-class (Atlantic 75)	Transferred to the relief fleet. Later at Burry Port.
2016–	B-894	Sheila & Dennis Tongue II	B-class (Atlantic 85)	

=== Launch and recovery tractors ===
On station	Op. No.	Reg. No.	Type	Comments
2003–2019	TW57Hc	DX03 UZF	Talus MB-4H Hydrostatic (Mk.2)	
2010	TA66	WK05 EBA	New Holland TC27D	
2010–	TA107	WA60 DHM	New Holland B3045	
2019–	TW36Hc	N805 XUJ	Talus MB-4H Hydrostatic (Mk.2)	

== See also ==
- List of RNLI stations
- List of former RNLI stations
- Royal National Lifeboat Institution lifeboats
- Talus Atlantic 85 DO-DO launch carriage
