= William Allestry (died 1700) =

English politician

William Allestry (ca. 1642 – ca. 1700) was an English lawyer and politician who sat in the House of Commons from 1685 to 1689.

Allestry was the son of Roger Allestry of Alvaston, Derbyshire and his wife Sarah Bradshaw, daughter of William Bradshaw of Derby. His father had been MP for Derby.

He was educated at Queen's College, Oxford and at Gray's Inn. He was commissioner for assessment at Derby from 1673 to 1680 and a J.P. for Derbyshire from 1680. He was High Sheriff of Derbyshire in 1683.

In 1685 Allestry was elected unopposed as Member of Parliament for Derby and held the seat until 1689. He played little part in parliament and was unsuccessful when he stood in 1690. Soon after he sold his estates at Walton-on-Trent and moved to Middlesex where he was a J.P.

Allestry died around 1700, "in great perplexity and trouble by reason of his debts".

Allestry married in 1668 Frances Lorymer, daughter of John Lorymer, apothecary of London.

Parliament of England
Preceded by George Vernon; Anchitell Grey	Member of Parliament for Derby; 1685–1689; With: John Coke	Succeeded by John Coke; Anchitell Grey
