= Sir Henry Willoughby, 1st Baronet =

English baronet (1579-1649)

Sir Henry Willoughby, 1st Baronet (14 September 1579 – 20 November 1649) was an English baronet.

== Early life ==
Willoughby was born on 14 September 1579 at Risley, Derbyshire. He was the son of Sir John Willoughby, of Risley (1555–1625), and Frances (née Hawe) Willoughby. Among his siblings were Ursula Willoughby (wife of Sir Clement Spelman and Sir John Potts, 1st Baronet, MP for Norfolk) and Elizabeth Willoughby (wife of Sir Augustine Palgrave).

His paternal grandparents were George Willoughby, of Risley, (Note: The Risley estate was acquired by Richard de Willoughby (c. 1290–1362), the Lord Chief Justice of England during the reign of Edward III, upon his 1310 marriage to Isabel Morteyne (d. 1332), daughter of Sir Roger Morteyne. Richard's younger son, Hugh Willoughby, settled at Risley, and his son, married the heiress of Dabridgecourt. Sir Henry Willoughby, 1st Baronet was the last heir male of this branch.) and Elizabeth Neale (a daughter of Richard Neale). His maternal grandfather was Henry Hawes of Helgay. Through his sister Ursula, he was uncle to Sir John Potts, 2nd Baronet and John Spelman, MP for Castle Rising. Through his sister Elizabeth, he was uncle to Sir John Palgrave, 1st Baronet, also MP for Norwich.

== Career ==
Willoughby was created a Baronet, of Risley in the County of Derby, in the Baronetage of England on 29 June 1611 during the lifetime of his father.

== Personal life ==
Willoughby was twice married. His first wife was Elizabeth Knollys (1579–1621), daughter of the privateer Sir Henry Knollys and Margaret Cave (a daughter of Sir Ambrose Cave, Chancellor of the Duchy of Lancaster). Before her death in 1621, they were the parents of two surviving daughters:

- Margaret Ann Willoughby (1605–1688), who married Sir Henry Griffith, 2nd Baronet of Burton Agnes, only son of Sir Henry Griffith, 1st Baronet.
- Anne Aston (1614–1688), who married Sir Thomas Aston, 1st Baronet, MP for Cheshire, in 1639. After his death in 1645, she married Hon. Anchitell Grey, MP for Derby and second son of Henry Grey, 1st Earl of Stamford.

Sir Henry remarried to Lettice Darcy (d. 1655), a daughter of Sir Francis Darcy, MP for Lymington and Middlesex, and Katherine (or Elizabeth) Legh (a daughter of Edward Legh of Rushall). With his second wife, the co-heiress of Darcy, he was the father of two more surviving daughters:

- Catherine Willoughby (c. 1625–1673), who married Sir James Bellingham, 2nd Baronet, a son of Sir Henry Bellingham, 1st Baronet and Dorothy Boynton (a daughter of Sir Francis Boynton). After his death in 1650, she married George Purefoy, Esq.
- Elizabeth Willoughby (c. 1625–1655), who married the noted antiquarian Sir Simonds d'Ewes, 1st Baronet. After his death, she married Sir John Wray, 3rd Baronet. After her death in 1655, he married Sarah Evelyn, a daughter of Sir John Evelyn.

Sir Henry died at Lavenham, Suffolk on 20 November 1649, upon which the title became extinct. Risley Hall was inherited by the Aston family through his second daughter, Anne.

=== Descendants ===
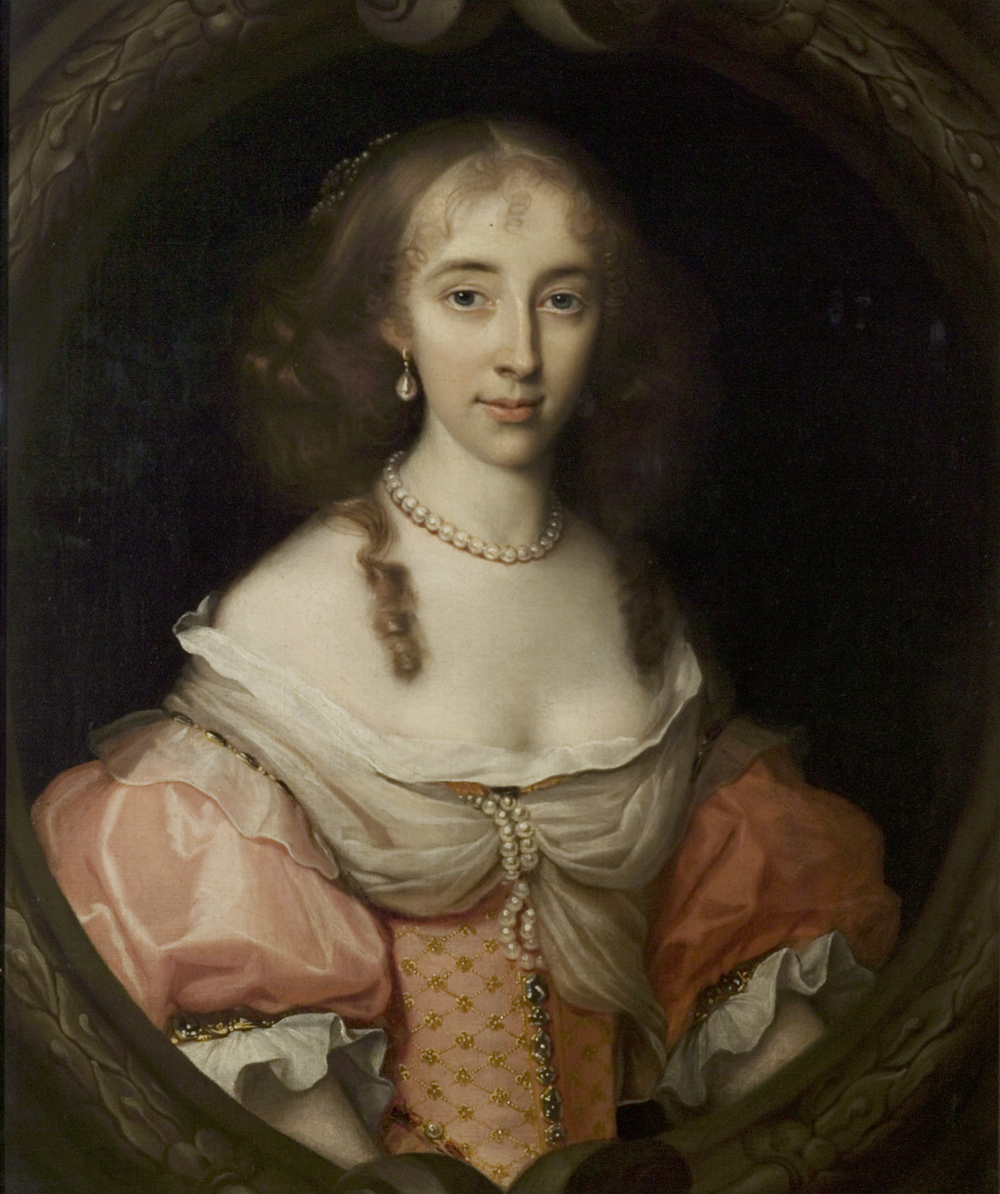
Portrait of his granddaughter, Magdalen, Lady Burdett, by John Michael Wright

Through his daughter Anne, he was a grandfather of Sir Willoughby Aston, 2nd Baronet and Magdalen Aston (second wife of Sir Robert Burdett, 3rd Baronet).

Through his daughter Elizabeth, he was a grandfather of Sir Willoughby d'Ewes, 2nd Baronet.

== Notes ==
Baronetage of England
New creation	Baronet (of Risley); 1611–1649	Extinct
Preceded by Savile baronets	Willoughby baronets 29 June 1611	Succeeded by Tresham baronets
