= Jenoure baronets =

Extinct baronetcy in the Baronetage of England

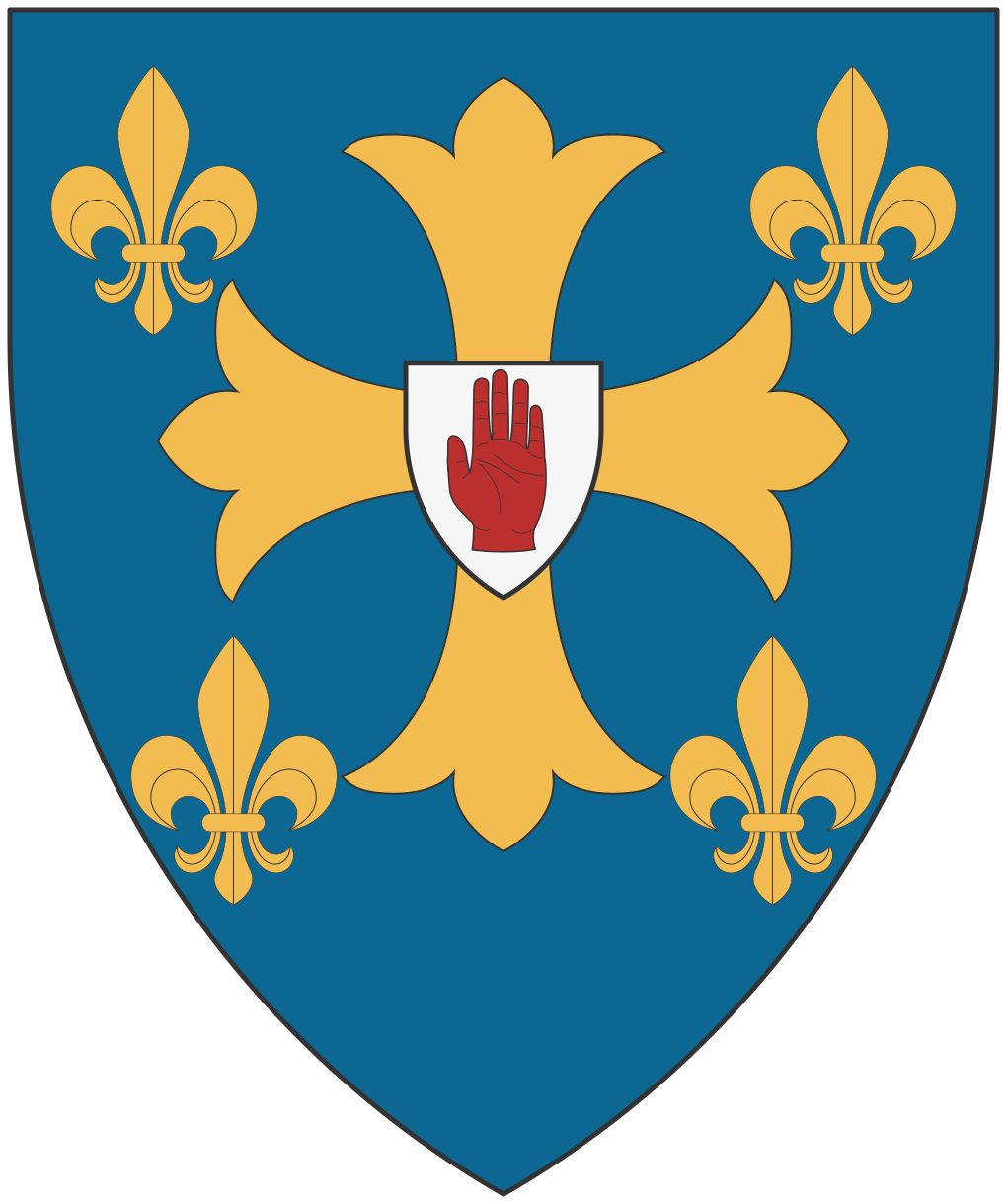
The coat of arms of Jenoure of Much Dunmow, Baronets.

The Jenoure Baronetcy, of Much Dunmow in the County of Essex, was a title in the Baronetage of England. It was created on 30 July 1628 for Kenelm Jenoure. The title became extinct on the death of the sixth Baronet in 1755.

== Jenoure baronets, of Much Dunmow (1628) ==
- Sir Kenelm Jenoure, 1st Baronet (died 1629)
- Sir Andrew Jenoure, 2nd Baronet (died c. 1692)
- Sir Maynard Jenoure, 3rd Baronet (c. 1667 – c. 1710)
- Sir John Jenoure, 4th Baronet (died 1739)
- Sir Richard Day Jenoure, 5th Baronet (c. 1718 – 1744)
- Sir John Jenoure, 6th Baronet (died 1755)
