= Willoughby baronets =

Set index for Willoughby baronets

There have been four baronetcies created for persons with the surname Willoughby, three in the Baronetage of England and one in the Baronetage of Great Britain. As of 2026 one creation is extant.

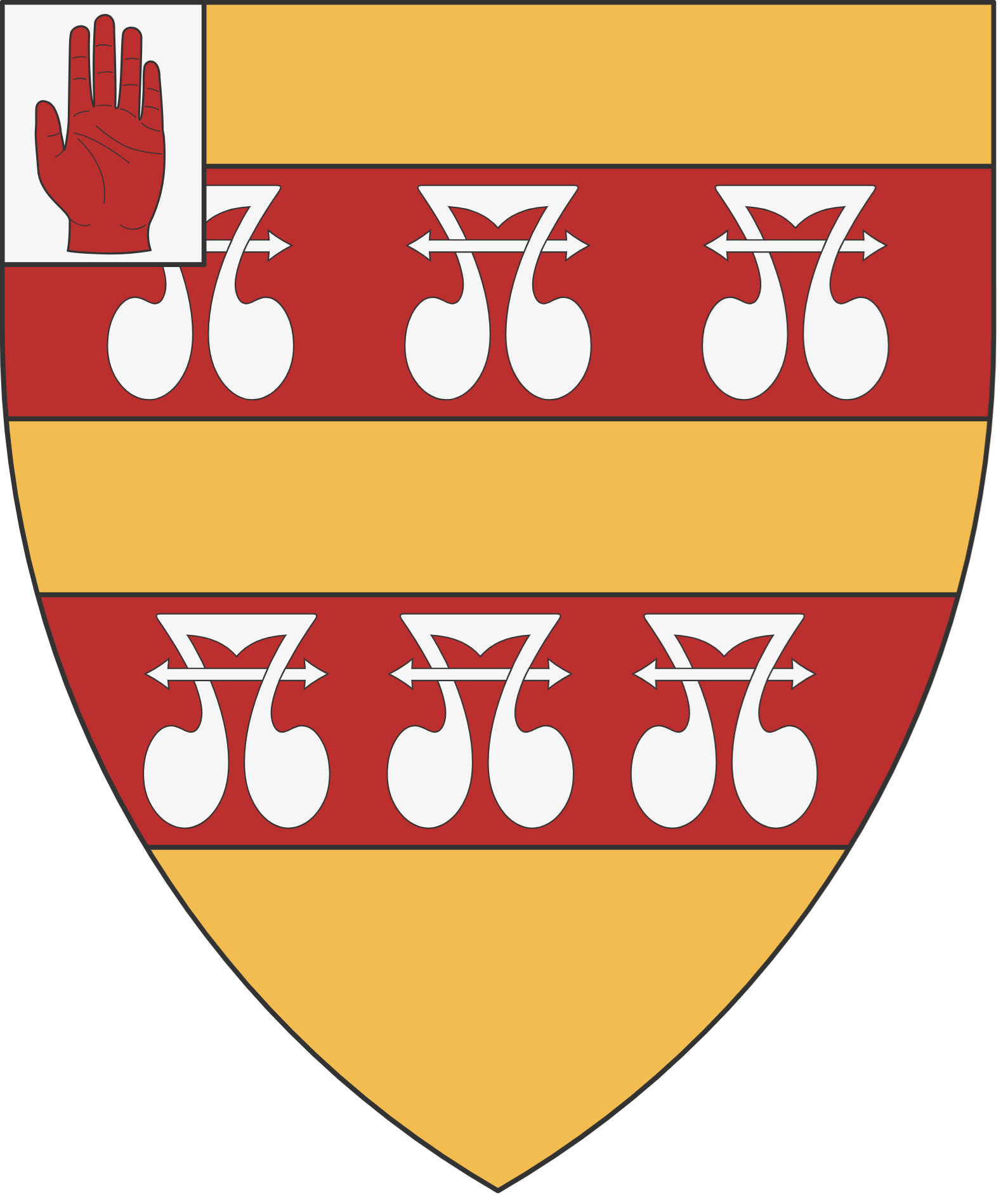
Arms of Willoughby of Risley, of Selston

- Willoughby baronets of Risley (1611): see Sir Henry Willoughby, 1st Baronet (1579–1649)
- Willoughby baronets of Selston (1660): see Sir William Willoughby, 1st Baronet (c. 1630–1671)
- Willoughby baronets of Wollaton (1677): see Baron Middleton
- Willoughby baronets of Baldon House (1794)
