= John Coke (died 1692) =

English politician

John Coke (c. 1653–1692) of Melbourne Hall, Melbourne, Derbyshire was an English politician who sat in the House of Commons in between 1685 and 1689.

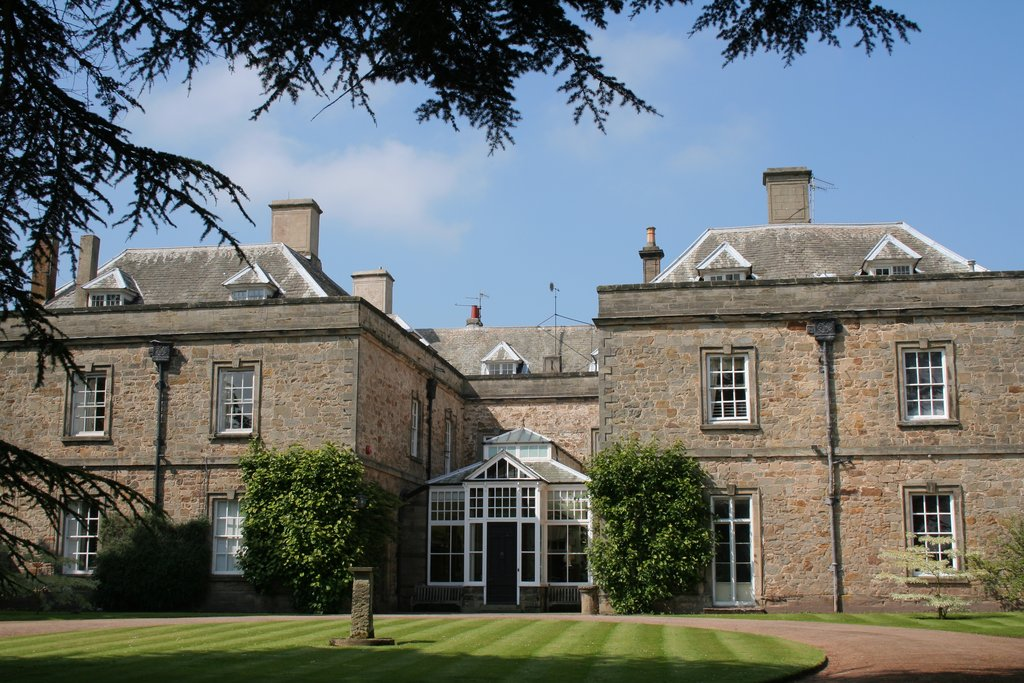
Melbourne Hall, Derbyshire

Coke was the son of Thomas Coke of Melbourne, and his wife Mary Pope, daughter of Richard Pope of Woolstaston, Shropshire. He entered Christ Church, Oxford and Gray's Inn in 1669. He was a commissioner for assessment for Derbyshire from 1673 to 1680. Coke stood unsuccessfully for parliament at Leicestershire in a by-election in April 1679 and at Derby in 1681. One of his opponents George Vernon was said to have uttered dangerous words which Coke forwarded to the government after the Rye House plot. He was a Deputy Lieutenant for Derbyshire and Leicestershire from 1680 to 1686. In 1685 he received a place at court as Gentleman usher to Queen Catherine of Braganza and became a captain in Princess Anne's Foot.

Coke was elected Member of Parliament for Derby in 1685 He was sent briefly to the Tower of London after opposing King James legislation requiring Catholics in the army. He was deprived of his commission, but at the Glorious Revolution raised a troop of horse for Prince William and was placed second in command of Lord Cavendish's regiment. In 1689 he was re-elected MP for Derby in the Convention Parliament of 1689.

Coke went abroad for health reasons and died at Geneva at the age of 39.

Coke married Mary Leventhorpe, daughter of Sir Thomas Leventhorpe, 4th Baronet in 1672. He had seven children and his son Thomas was also MP for Derbyshire.
