= Saint-Germain-le-Gaillard =

Saint-Germain-le-Gaillard may refer to the following communes in France:

- Saint-Germain-le-Gaillard, Eure-et-Loir, in the Eure-et-Loir département
- Saint-Germain-le-Gaillard, Manche, in the Manche département
