= Chuisnes =

- Commune
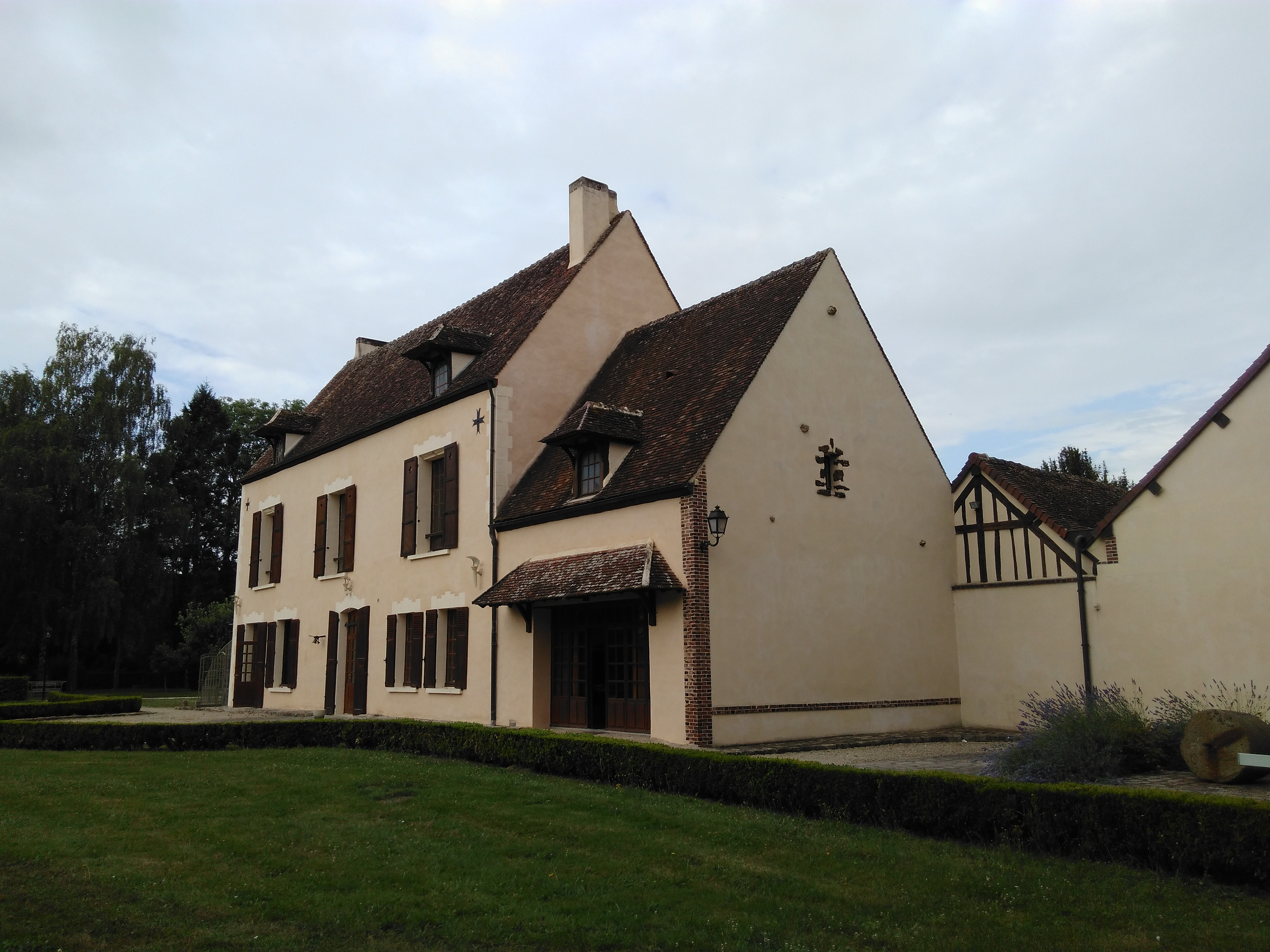
- The town hall in Chuisnes
- Location of Chuisnes
- Location within France Location within Centre-Val de Loire
- Coordinates: 48°26′53″N 1°12′31″E
- Country: France
- Region: Centre-Val de Loire
- Department: Eure-et-Loir
- Arrondissement: Chartres
- Canton: Illiers-Combray
- Intercommunality: Entre Beauce et Perche

Government
  - Mayor (2020–2026): Jacques Maupu
- Area^{1}: 22.98 km^{2} (8.87 sq mi)
- Elevation: 166 m (545 ft)
- Highest elevation: 227 m (745 ft)
- Lowest elevation: 162 m (531 ft)
- Population (2023): 1,126
  - Density: 49.00/km^{2} (126.9/sq mi)
- Time zone: UTC+01:00 (CET)
  - Summer (DST): UTC+02:00 (CEST)
- INSEE/Postal code: 28099 /28190
- ^{1} French Land Register data, which excludes lakes, ponds, glaciers > 1 km^{2} (0.386 sq mi or 247 acres) and river estuaries.

Chuisnes (French pronunciation: [ʃɥin]) is a commune in the Eure-et-Loir department in northern France.

== Geography ==
The Commune along with another 70 communes shares part of a 47,681 hectare, Natura 2000 conservation area, called the Forêts et étangs du Perche.

== Population ==
Historical population
Year	Pop.	±% p.a.
1968	542	—
1975	573	+0.80%
1982	694	+2.77%
1990	782	+1.50%
1999	815	+0.46%
2007	965	+2.13%
2012	1,060	+1.90%
2017	1,127	+1.23%
2023	1,126	−0.01%
Source: INSEE

== See also ==
- Communes of the Eure-et-Loir department
