= Épeautrolles =

- Commune
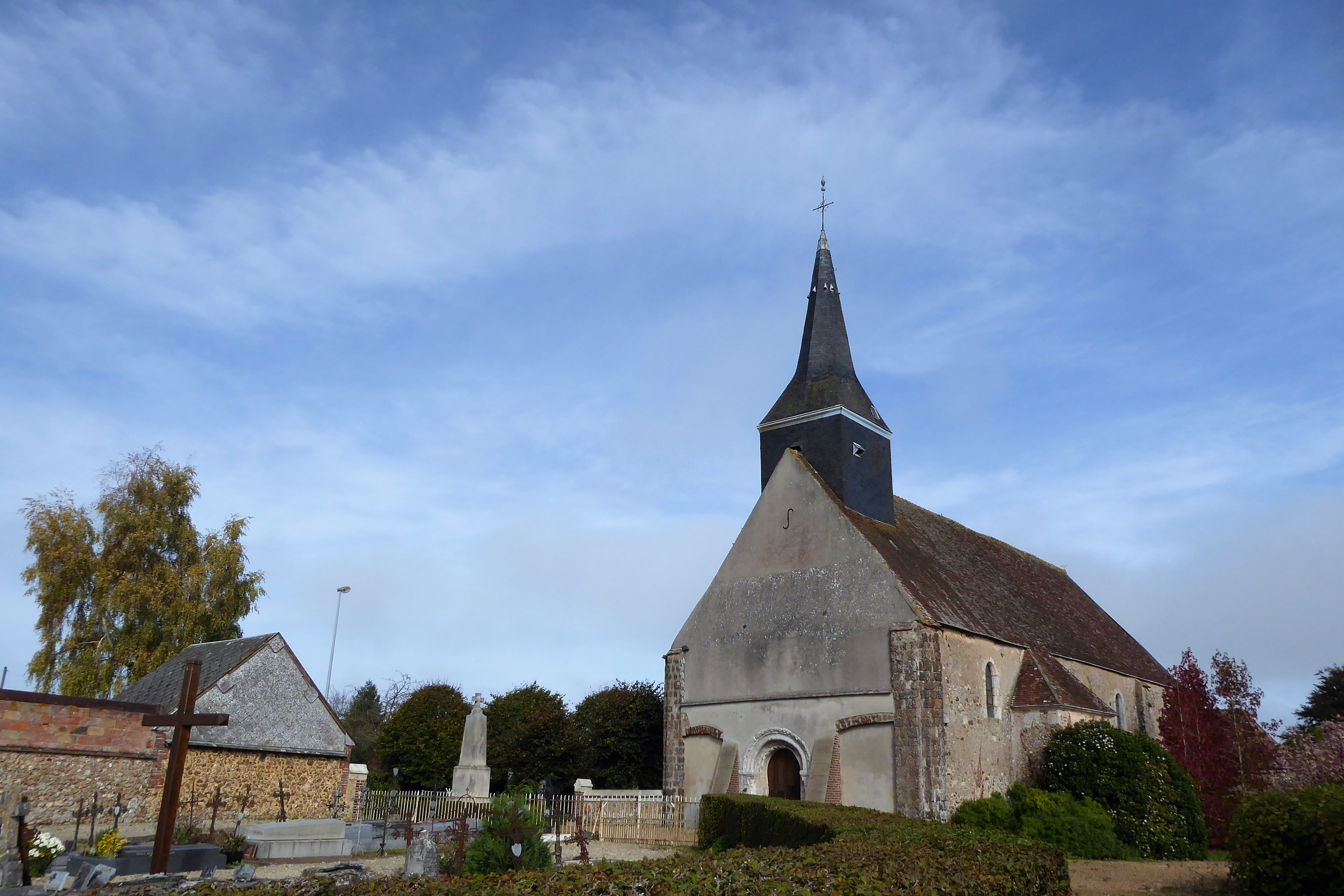
- The church in Épeautrolles
- Location of Épeautrolles
- Location within France Location within Centre-Val de Loire
- Coordinates: 48°18′43″N 1°19′34″E
- Country: France
- Region: Centre-Val de Loire
- Department: Eure-et-Loir
- Arrondissement: Chartres
- Canton: Illiers-Combray

Government
  - Mayor (2020–2026): Bruno Taranne
- Area^{1}: 9.31 km^{2} (3.59 sq mi)
- Elevation: 160 m (520 ft)
- Highest elevation: 167 m (548 ft)
- Lowest elevation: 150 m (490 ft)
- Population (2023): 165
  - Density: 17.7/km^{2} (45.9/sq mi)
- Time zone: UTC+01:00 (CET)
  - Summer (DST): UTC+02:00 (CEST)
- INSEE/Postal code: 28139 /28120
- ^{1} French Land Register data, which excludes lakes, ponds, glaciers > 1 km^{2} (0.386 sq mi or 247 acres) and river estuaries.

Épeautrolles (French pronunciation: [epotʁɔl]) is a commune in the Eure-et-Loir department in northern France.

== Population ==
Historical population
Year	Pop.	±% p.a.
1968	116	—
1975	108	−1.02%
1982	127	+2.34%
1990	130	+0.29%
1999	147	+1.37%
2007	179	+2.49%
2012	189	+1.09%
2017	186	−0.32%
2023	165	−1.98%
Source: INSEE

== See also ==
- Communes of the Eure-et-Loir department
