= Orrouer =

- Commune
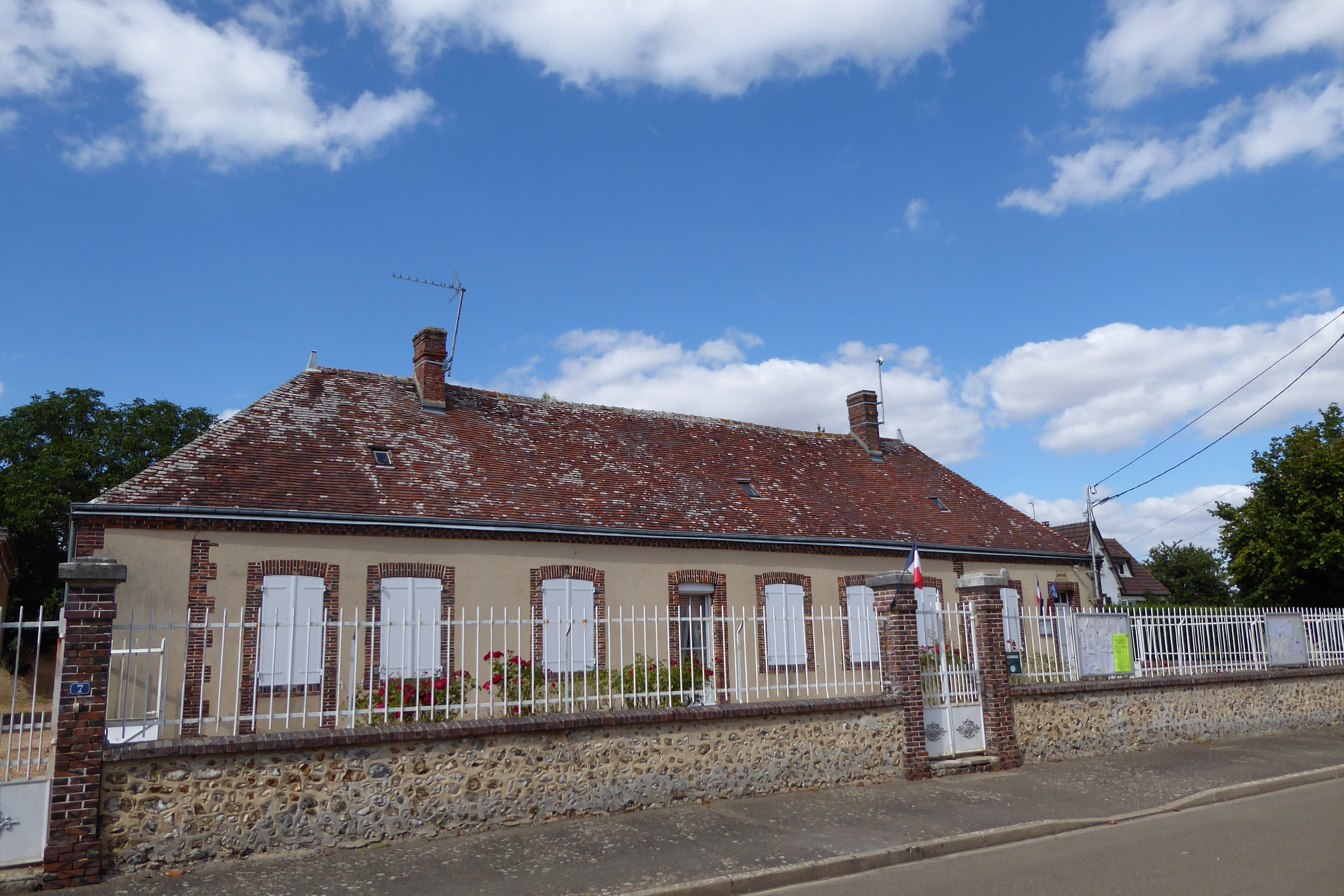
- The town hall in Orrouer
- Location of Orrouer
- Location within France Location within Centre-Val de Loire
- Coordinates: 48°24′50″N 1°17′19″E
- Country: France
- Region: Centre-Val de Loire
- Department: Eure-et-Loir
- Arrondissement: Chartres
- Canton: Illiers-Combray
- Intercommunality: Entre Beauce et Perche

Government
  - Mayor (2020–2026): Claude Feret
- Area^{1}: 13.25 km^{2} (5.12 sq mi)
- Elevation: 162 m (531 ft)
- Highest elevation: 193 m (633 ft)
- Lowest elevation: 152 m (499 ft)
- Population (2023): 282
  - Density: 21.3/km^{2} (55.1/sq mi)
- Time zone: UTC+01:00 (CET)
  - Summer (DST): UTC+02:00 (CEST)
- INSEE/Postal code: 28290 /28190
- ^{1} French Land Register data, which excludes lakes, ponds, glaciers > 1 km^{2} (0.386 sq mi or 247 acres) and river estuaries.

Orrouer is a commune in the Eure-et-Loir department in northern France.

== Population ==
Historical population
Year	Pop.	±% p.a.
1968	164	—
1975	162	−0.18%
1982	186	+1.99%
1990	196	+0.66%
1999	239	+2.23%
2007	275	+1.77%
2012	281	+0.43%
2017	301	+1.38%
2023	282	−1.08%
Source: INSEE

== See also ==
- Communes of the Eure-et-Loir department
