= Saint-Éman =

- Commune
- Location of Saint-Éman
- Location within France Location within Centre-Val de Loire
- Coordinates: 48°19′22″N 1°13′07″E
- Country: France
- Region: Centre-Val de Loire
- Department: Eure-et-Loir
- Arrondissement: Chartres
- Canton: Illiers-Combray

Government
  - Mayor (2020–2026): Michèle Cat
- Area^{1}: 4.6 km^{2} (1.8 sq mi)
- Elevation: 150 m (490 ft)
- Highest elevation: 199 m (653 ft)
- Lowest elevation: 153 m (502 ft)
- Population (2023): 94
  - Density: 20/km^{2} (53/sq mi)
- Time zone: UTC+01:00 (CET)
  - Summer (DST): UTC+02:00 (CEST)
- INSEE/Postal code: 28336 /28120
- ^{1} French Land Register data, which excludes lakes, ponds, glaciers > 1 km^{2} (0.386 sq mi or 247 acres) and river estuaries.

Saint-Éman (French pronunciation: [sɛ̃.t‿emɑ̃]) is a commune in the Eure-et-Loir department in northern France.

== Population ==
Historical population
Year	Pop.	±% p.a.
1968	47	—
1975	41	−1.93%
1982	92	+12.24%
1990	126	+4.01%
1999	143	+1.42%
2007	118	−2.37%
2012	111	−1.22%
2017	108	−0.55%
2023	94	−2.29%
Source: INSEE

== See also ==
- Communes of the Eure-et-Loir department
