= Saint-Arnoult-des-Bois =

- Commune
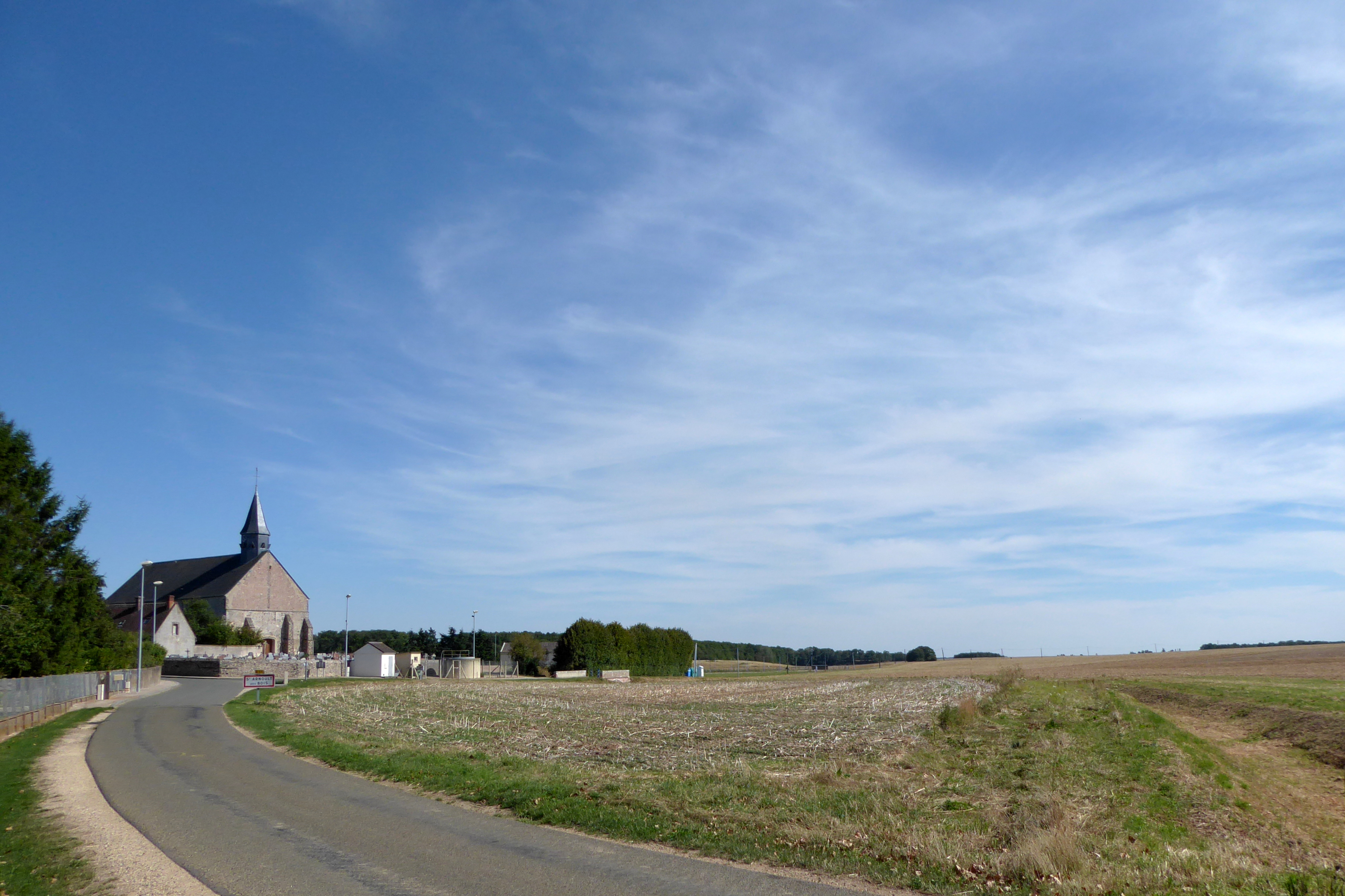
- The church and surroundings in Saint-Arnoult-des-Bois

- Coat of arms
- Location of Saint-Arnoult-des-Bois
- Location within France Location within Centre-Val de Loire
- Coordinates: 48°29′36″N 1°15′50″E
- Country: France
- Region: Centre-Val de Loire
- Department: Eure-et-Loir
- Arrondissement: Chartres
- Canton: Illiers-Combray

Government
  - Mayor (2023–2026): Bertrand de Lacheisserie
- Area^{1}: 20.67 km^{2} (7.98 sq mi)
- Elevation: 188 m (617 ft)
- Highest elevation: 247 m (810 ft)
- Lowest elevation: 163 m (535 ft)
- Population (2023): 897
  - Density: 43.4/km^{2} (112/sq mi)
- Time zone: UTC+01:00 (CET)
  - Summer (DST): UTC+02:00 (CEST)
- INSEE/Postal code: 28324 /28190
- ^{1} French Land Register data, which excludes lakes, ponds, glaciers > 1 km^{2} (0.386 sq mi or 247 acres) and river estuaries.

Saint-Arnoult-des-Bois (French pronunciation: [sɛ̃.t‿aʁnu de bwa]) is a commune in the Eure-et-Loir department in northern France.

== Population ==
Historical population
| Year | Pop. | ±% p.a. |
|---|---|---|
| 1968 | 360 | — |
| 1975 | 355 | −0.20% |
| 1982 | 480 | +4.40% |
| 1990 | 646 | +3.78% |
| 1999 | 667 | +0.36% |
| 2007 | 836 | +2.86% |
| 2012 | 883 | +1.10% |
| 2017 | 888 | +0.11% |
| 2023 | 897 | +0.17% |
Source: INSEE

== See also ==
- Communes of the Eure-et-Loir department
