= Landelles =

- Commune
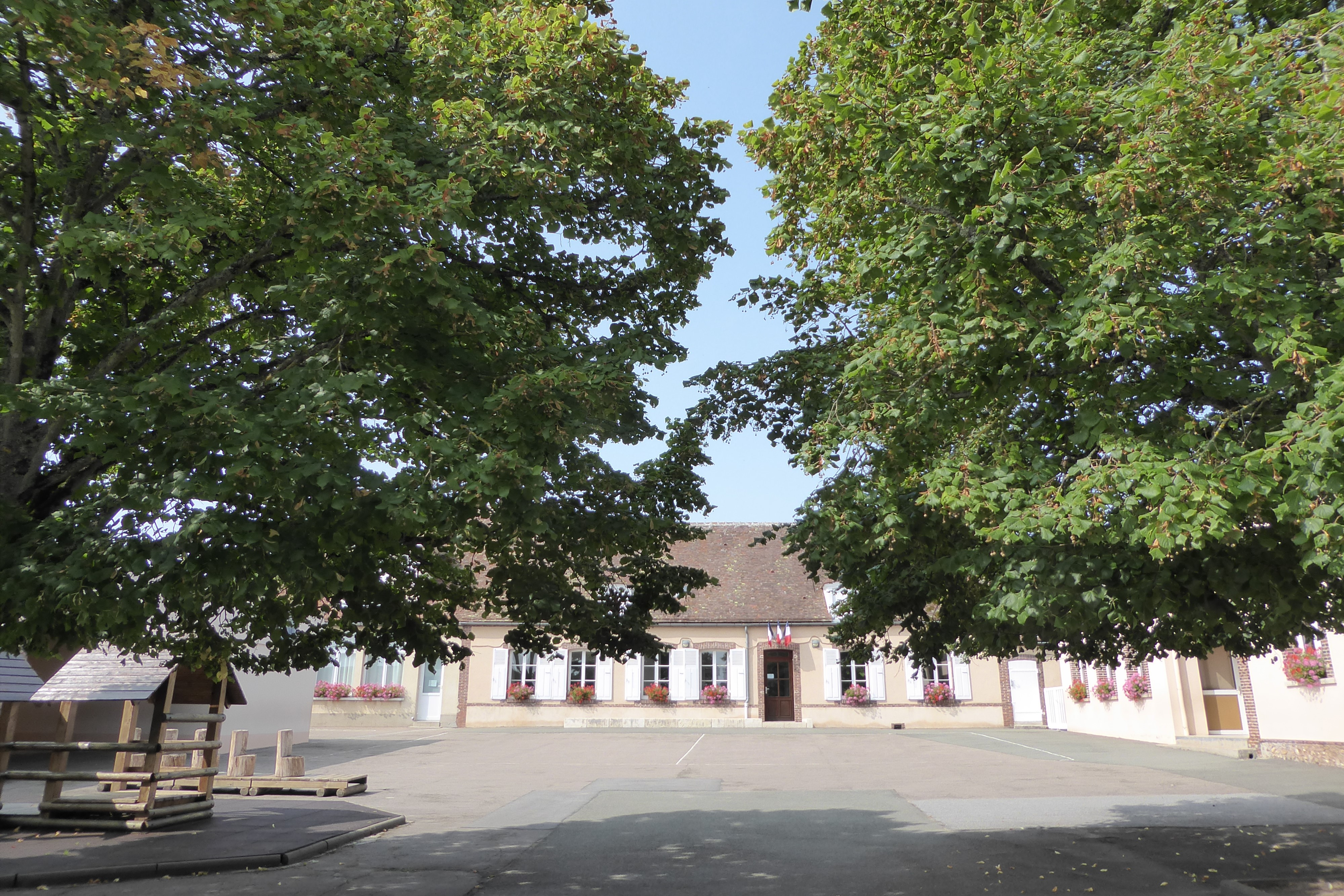
- The town hall in Landelles
- Location of Landelles
- Location within France Location within Centre-Val de Loire
- Coordinates: 48°28′08″N 1°11′57″E
- Country: France
- Region: Centre-Val de Loire
- Department: Eure-et-Loir
- Arrondissement: Chartres
- Canton: Illiers-Combray

Government
  - Mayor (2020–2026): Jean-Luc Julien
- Area^{1}: 10.35 km^{2} (4.00 sq mi)
- Elevation: 196 m (643 ft)
- Highest elevation: 212 m (696 ft)
- Lowest elevation: 166 m (545 ft)
- Population (2023): 628
  - Density: 60.7/km^{2} (157/sq mi)
- Time zone: UTC+01:00 (CET)
  - Summer (DST): UTC+02:00 (CEST)
- INSEE/Postal code: 28203 /28190
- ^{1} French Land Register data, which excludes lakes, ponds, glaciers > 1 km^{2} (0.386 sq mi or 247 acres) and river estuaries.

Landelles (French pronunciation: [lɑ̃dɛl]) is a commune in the Eure-et-Loir department in northern France.

== Geography ==
The Commune along with another 70 communes shares part of a 47,681 hectare, Natura 2000 conservation area, called the Forêts et étangs du Perche.

== Population ==
Historical population
Year	Pop.	±% p.a.
1968	275	—
1975	326	+2.46%
1982	371	+1.86%
1990	493	+3.62%
1999	532	+0.85%
2007	571	+0.89%
2012	605	+1.16%
2017	640	+1.13%
2023	628	−0.31%
Source: INSEE

== See also ==
- Communes of the Eure-et-Loir department
