= Saint-Avit-les-Guespières =

- Commune
- Location of Saint-Avit-les-Guespières
- Location within France Location within Centre-Val de Loire
- Coordinates: 48°16′17″N 1°16′19″E
- Country: France
- Region: Centre-Val de Loire
- Department: Eure-et-Loir
- Arrondissement: Châteaudun
- Canton: Illiers-Combray

Government
  - Mayor (2020–2026): François Goblet
- Area^{1}: 12.64 km^{2} (4.88 sq mi)
- Elevation: 154 m (505 ft)
- Highest elevation: 167 m (548 ft)
- Lowest elevation: 137 m (449 ft)
- Population (2023): 342
  - Density: 27.1/km^{2} (70.1/sq mi)
- Time zone: UTC+01:00 (CET)
  - Summer (DST): UTC+02:00 (CEST)
- INSEE/Postal code: 28326 /28120
- ^{1} French Land Register data, which excludes lakes, ponds, glaciers > 1 km^{2} (0.386 sq mi or 247 acres) and river estuaries.

Saint-Avit-les-Guespières is a commune in the Eure-et-Loir department in northern France.

== Population ==
Historical population
Year	Pop.	±% p.a.
1968	275	—
1975	235	−2.22%
1982	276	+2.32%
1990	304	+1.22%
1999	307	+0.11%
2007	317	+0.40%
2012	369	+3.08%
2017	362	−0.38%
2023	342	−0.94%
Source: INSEE

== See also ==
- Communes of the Eure-et-Loir department
