= Ollé =

- Commune
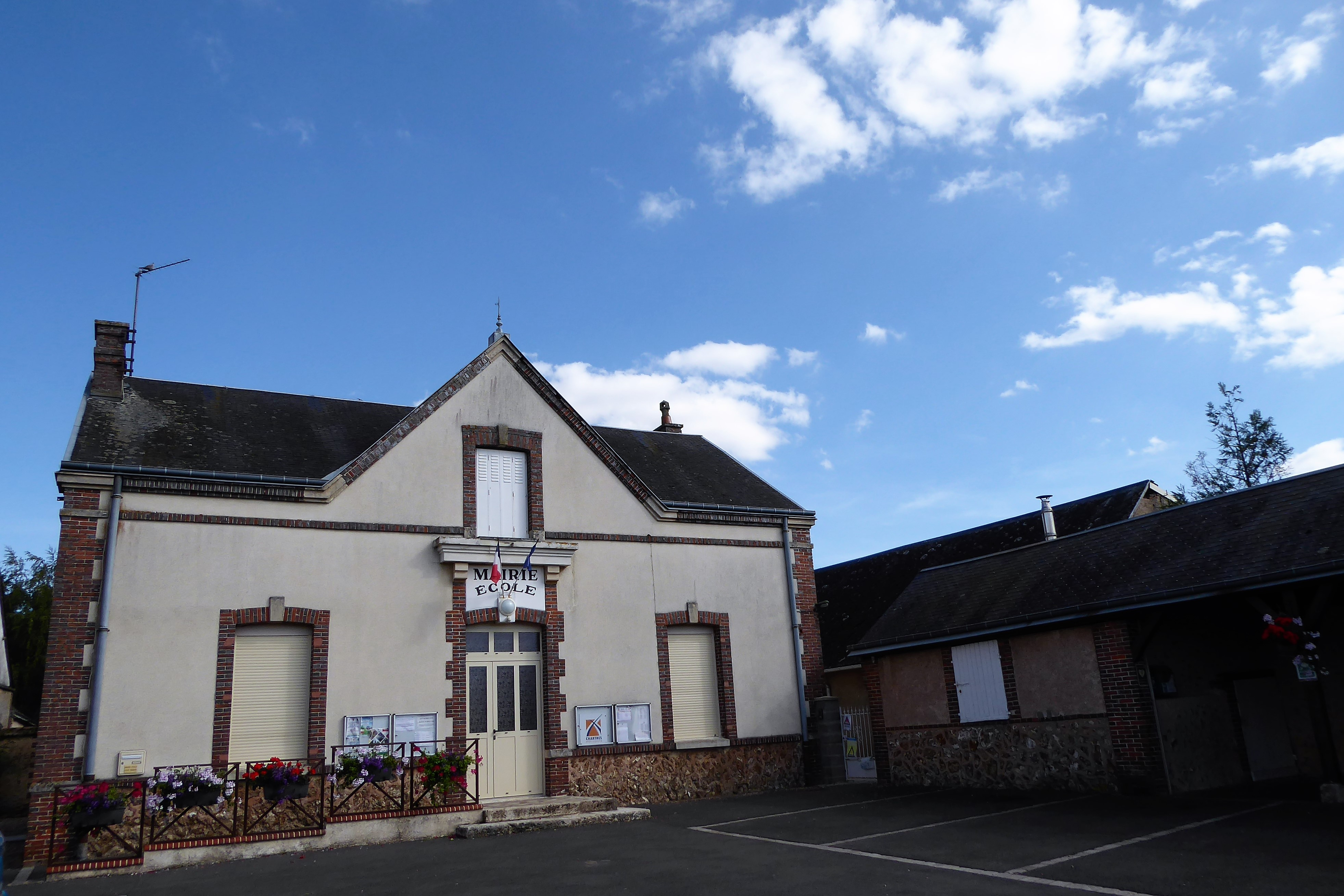
- The town hall and school in Ollé
- Location of Ollé
- Location within France Location within Centre-Val de Loire
- Coordinates: 48°23′19″N 1°17′52″E
- Country: France
- Region: Centre-Val de Loire
- Department: Eure-et-Loir
- Arrondissement: Chartres
- Canton: Illiers-Combray
- Intercommunality: CA Chartres Métropole

Government
  - Mayor (2020–2026): Jérôme Pavard
- Area^{1}: 13.12 km^{2} (5.07 sq mi)
- Elevation: 170 m (560 ft)
- Highest elevation: 193 m (633 ft)
- Lowest elevation: 152 m (499 ft)
- Population (2023): 625
  - Density: 47.6/km^{2} (123/sq mi)
- Time zone: UTC+01:00 (CET)
  - Summer (DST): UTC+02:00 (CEST)
- INSEE/Postal code: 28286 /28120
- ^{1} French Land Register data, which excludes lakes, ponds, glaciers > 1 km^{2} (0.386 sq mi or 247 acres) and river estuaries.

Ollé (French pronunciation: [ɔle]) is a commune in the Eure-et-Loir department in northern France.

== Population ==
Historical population
| Year | Pop. | ±% p.a. |
|---|---|---|
| 1968 | 313 | — |
| 1975 | 320 | +0.32% |
| 1982 | 405 | +3.42% |
| 1990 | 479 | +2.12% |
| 1999 | 550 | +1.55% |
| 2007 | 575 | +0.56% |
| 2012 | 606 | +1.06% |
| 2017 | 612 | +0.20% |
| 2023 | 625 | +0.35% |
Source: INSEE

== See also ==
- Communes of the Eure-et-Loir department
