= Saint-Denis-des-Puits =

- Commune
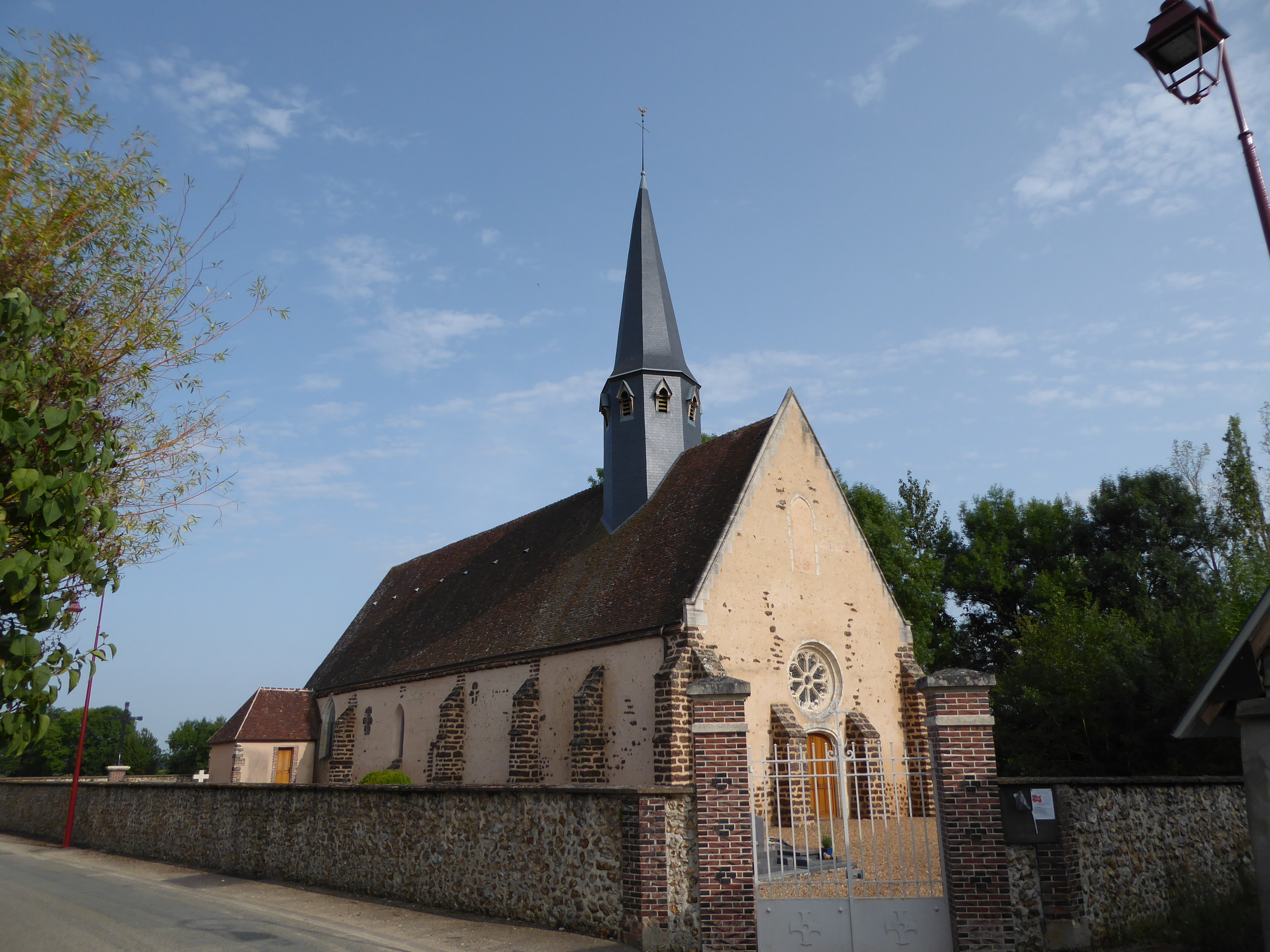
- The church in Saint-Denis-des-Puits
- Location of Saint-Denis-des-Puits
- Location within France Location within Centre-Val de Loire
- Coordinates: 48°23′33″N 1°10′18″E
- Country: France
- Region: Centre-Val de Loire
- Department: Eure-et-Loir
- Arrondissement: Chartres
- Canton: Illiers-Combray
- Intercommunality: CC Entre Beauce et Perche

Government
  - Mayor (2020–2026): Olivier Donck
- Area^{1}: 13.53 km^{2} (5.22 sq mi)
- Elevation: 201 m (659 ft)
- Highest elevation: 248 m (814 ft)
- Lowest elevation: 189 m (620 ft)
- Population (2023): 150
  - Density: 11/km^{2} (29/sq mi)
- Time zone: UTC+01:00 (CET)
  - Summer (DST): UTC+02:00 (CEST)
- INSEE/Postal code: 28333 /28240
- ^{1} French Land Register data, which excludes lakes, ponds, glaciers > 1 km^{2} (0.386 sq mi or 247 acres) and river estuaries.

Saint-Denis-des-Puits (French pronunciation: [sɛ̃ dəni də pɥi]) is a commune in the Eure-et-Loir department and Centre-Val de Loire region of north-central France. It lies 24 km west-south-west of Chartres and around 100 km from Paris.

== Geography ==
The Commune along with another 70 communes shares part of a 47,681 hectare, Natura 2000 conservation area, called the Forêts et étangs du Perche.

== Population ==
Historical population
Year	Pop.	±% p.a.
1968	114	—
1975	104	−1.30%
1982	69	−5.69%
1990	81	+2.02%
1999	116	+4.07%
2007	118	+0.21%
2012	141	+3.63%
2017	139	−0.29%
2023	150	+1.28%
Source: INSEE

== See also ==
- Communes of the Eure-et-Loir department
