= Canton of Illiers-Combray =

Coordinates: 48.30°N 1.24°E

The canton of Illiers-Combray is an administrative division of the Eure-et-Loir department, northern France. Its borders were modified at the French canton reorganisation which came into effect in March 2015. Its seat is in Illiers-Combray.

It consists of the following communes:

1. Bailleau-le-Pin
2. Billancelles
3. Blandainville
4. Cernay
5. Charonville
6. Les Châtelliers-Notre-Dame
7. Chauffours
8. Chuisnes
9. Courville-sur-Eure
10. Dangers
11. Épeautrolles
12. Ermenonville-la-Grande
13. Ermenonville-la-Petite
14. Le Favril
15. Fontaine-la-Guyon
16. Friaize
17. Fruncé
18. Illiers-Combray
19. Landelles
20. Luplanté
21. Magny
22. Marchéville
23. Méréglise
24. Meslay-le-Grenet
25. Mittainvilliers-Vérigny
26. Nogent-sur-Eure
27. Ollé
28. Orrouer
29. Pontgouin
30. Saint-Arnoult-des-Bois
31. Saint-Avit-les-Guespières
32. Saint-Denis-des-Puits
33. Saint-Éman
34. Saint-Georges-sur-Eure
35. Saint-Germain-le-Gaillard
36. Saint-Luperce
37. Sandarville
38. Le Thieulin
39. Vieuvicq
40. Villebon
