= Fontaine-la-Guyon =

- Commune
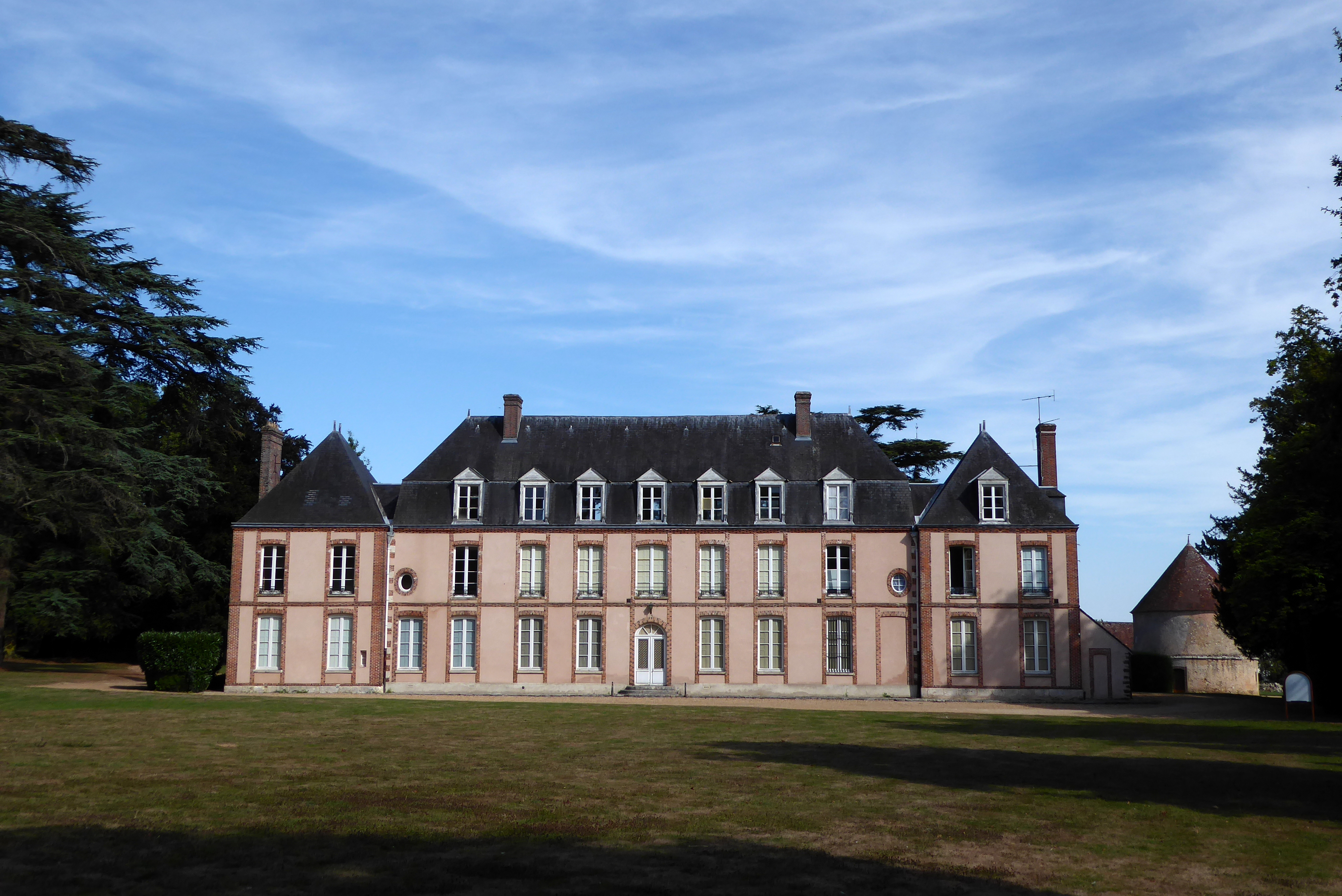
- The town hall in Fontaine-la-Guyon
- Location of Fontaine-la-Guyon
- Location within France Location within Centre-Val de Loire
- Coordinates: 48°28′22″N 1°18′48″E
- Country: France
- Region: Centre-Val de Loire
- Department: Eure-et-Loir
- Arrondissement: Chartres
- Canton: Illiers-Combray
- Intercommunality: Entre Beauce et Perche

Government
  - Mayor (2020–2026): Pascal Riolet
- Area^{1}: 14.59 km^{2} (5.63 sq mi)
- Elevation: 177 m (581 ft)
- Highest elevation: 237 m (778 ft)
- Lowest elevation: 158 m (518 ft)
- Population (2023): 1,684
  - Density: 115.4/km^{2} (298.9/sq mi)
- Time zone: UTC+01:00 (CET)
  - Summer (DST): UTC+02:00 (CEST)
- INSEE/Postal code: 28154 /28190
- ^{1} French Land Register data, which excludes lakes, ponds, glaciers > 1 km^{2} (0.386 sq mi or 247 acres) and river estuaries.

Fontaine-la-Guyon (French pronunciation: [fɔ̃tɛn la ɡɥijɔ̃]) is a commune in the Eure-et-Loir department in northern France.

== Population ==
Historical population
Year	Pop.	±% p.a.
1968	488	—
1975	570	+2.24%
1982	675	+2.44%
1990	732	+1.02%
1999	1,020	+3.76%
2007	1,413	+4.16%
2012	1,625	+2.84%
2017	1,664	+0.48%
2023	1,684	+0.20%
Source: INSEE

== See also ==
- Communes of the Eure-et-Loir department
