= Le Favril, Eure-et-Loir =

Le Favril
- Commune
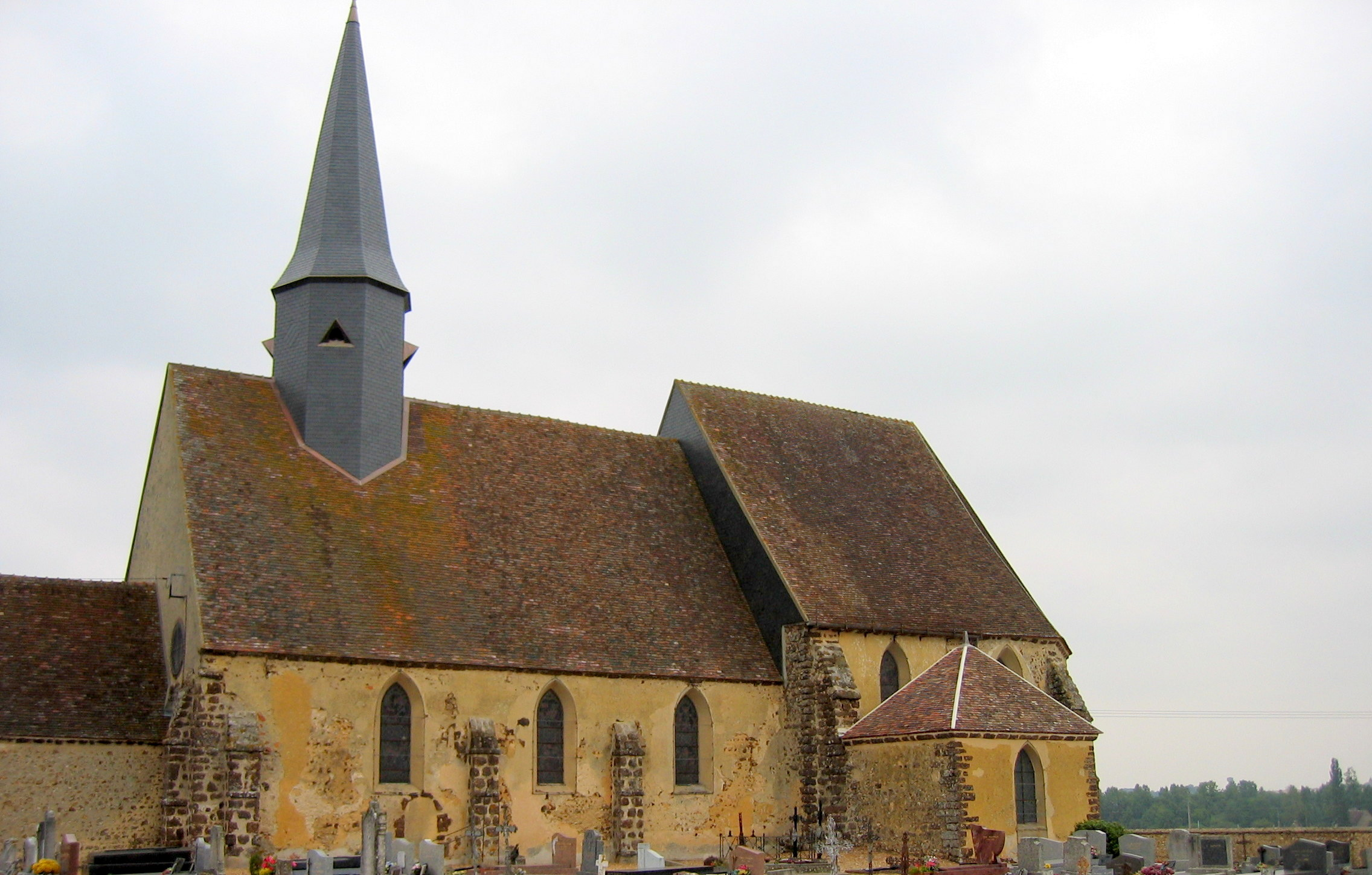
- The church in Le Favril
- Location of Le Favril
- Location within France Location within Centre-Val de Loire
- Coordinates: 48°27′52″N 1°07′46″E
- Country: France
- Region: Centre-Val de Loire
- Department: Eure-et-Loir
- Arrondissement: Chartres
- Canton: Illiers-Combray

Government
  - Mayor (2020–2026): John Billard
- Area^{1}: 23.8 km^{2} (9.2 sq mi)
- Highest elevation: 247 m (810 ft)
- Lowest elevation: 178 m (584 ft)
- Population (2023): 360
  - Density: 15/km^{2} (39/sq mi)
- Time zone: UTC+01:00 (CET)
  - Summer (DST): UTC+02:00 (CEST)
- INSEE/Postal code: 28148 /28190
- ^{1} French Land Register data, which excludes lakes, ponds, glaciers > 1 km^{2} (0.386 sq mi or 247 acres) and river estuaries.

Le Favril (French pronunciation: [lə favʁil]) is a commune in the Eure-et-Loir department in northern France.

== Geography ==
The Commune along with another 70 communes shares part of a 47,681 hectare, Natura 2000 conservation area, called the Forêts et étangs du Perche.

== Population ==
Historical population
| Year | Pop. | ±% p.a. |
|---|---|---|
| 1968 | 277 | — |
| 1975 | 268 | −0.47% |
| 1982 | 266 | −0.11% |
| 1990 | 300 | +1.51% |
| 1999 | 280 | −0.76% |
| 2007 | 319 | +1.64% |
| 2012 | 339 | +1.22% |
| 2017 | 363 | +1.38% |
| 2023 | 360 | −0.14% |
Source: INSEE

== See also ==
- Communes of the Eure-et-Loir department
