= Luplanté =

- Commune
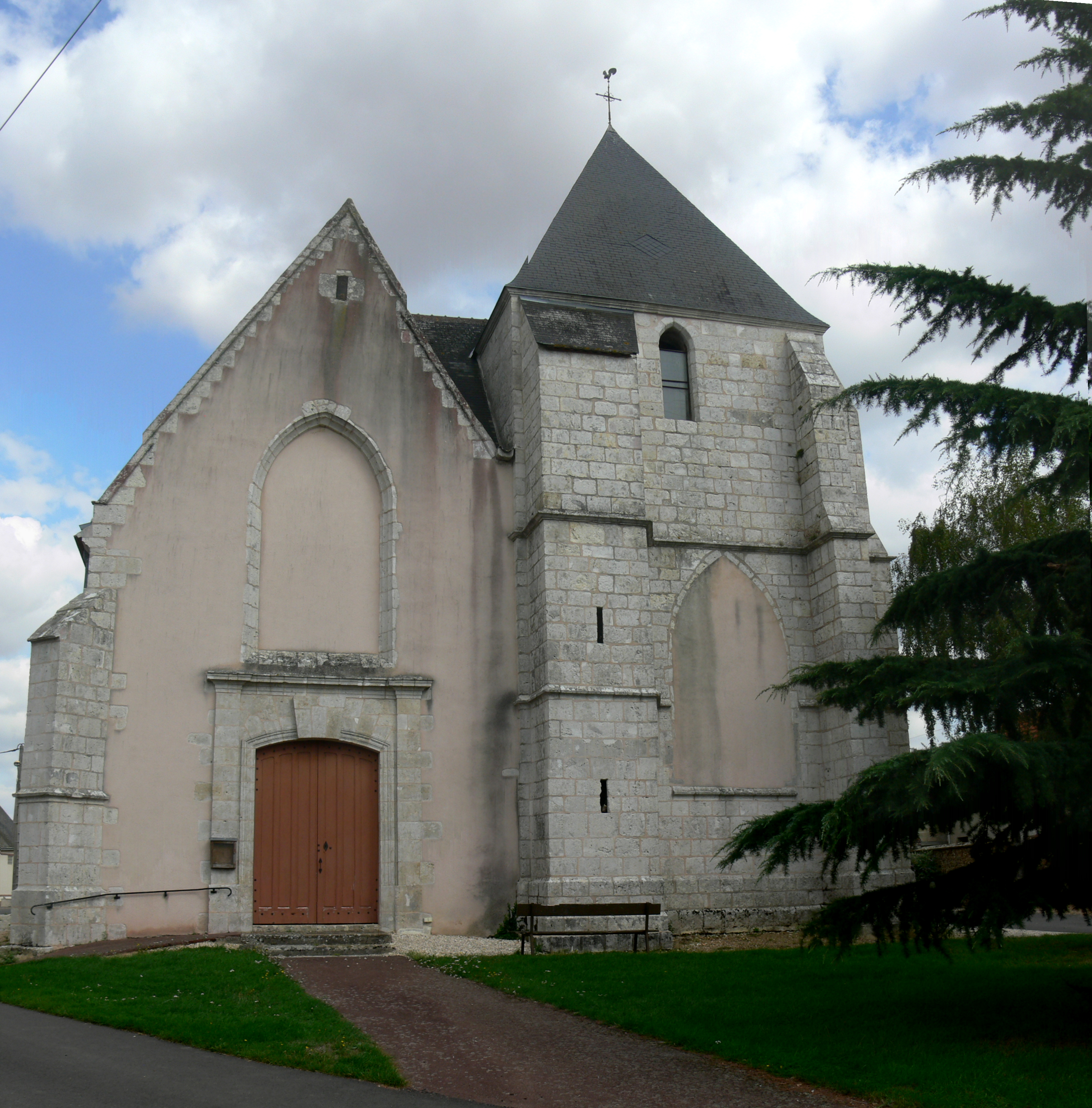
- The church in Luplanté

- Coat of arms
- Location of Luplanté
- Location within France Location within Centre-Val de Loire
- Coordinates: 48°18′02″N 1°23′59″E
- Country: France
- Region: Centre-Val de Loire
- Department: Eure-et-Loir
- Arrondissement: Chartres
- Canton: Illiers-Combray

Government
  - Mayor (2020–2026): Jacky Huline
- Area^{1}: 16.65 km^{2} (6.43 sq mi)
- Elevation: 156 m (512 ft)
- Highest elevation: 162 m (531 ft)
- Lowest elevation: 133 m (436 ft)
- Population (2023): 384
  - Density: 23.1/km^{2} (59.7/sq mi)
- Time zone: UTC+01:00 (CET)
  - Summer (DST): UTC+02:00 (CEST)
- INSEE/Postal code: 28222 /28360
- ^{1} French Land Register data, which excludes lakes, ponds, glaciers > 1 km^{2} (0.386 sq mi or 247 acres) and river estuaries.

Luplanté (French pronunciation: [lyplɑ̃te]) is a commune in the Eure-et-Loir department in northern France.

== Population ==
Historical population
Year	Pop.	±% p.a.
1968	265	—
1975	241	−1.35%
1982	267	+1.47%
1990	260	−0.33%
1999	317	+2.23%
2007	400	+2.95%
2012	391	−0.45%
2017	386	−0.26%
2023	384	−0.09%
Source: INSEE

== See also ==
- Communes of the Eure-et-Loir department
