= Méréglise =

- Commune
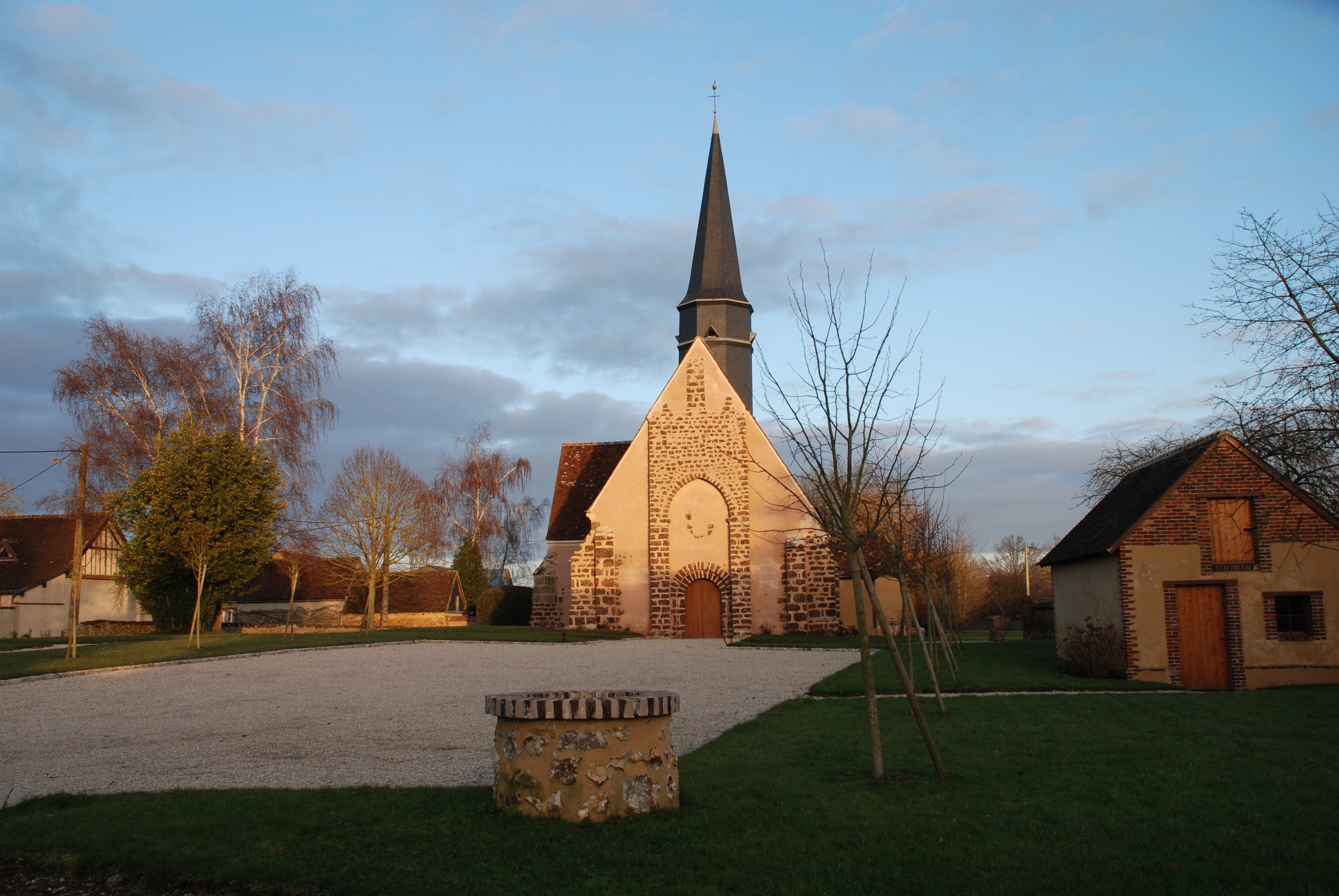
- The church in Méréglise
- Location of Méréglise
- Location within France Location within Centre-Val de Loire
- Coordinates: 48°17′27″N 1°11′10″E
- Country: France
- Region: Centre-Val de Loire
- Department: Eure-et-Loir
- Arrondissement: Chartres
- Canton: Illiers-Combray

Government
  - Mayor (2020–2026): Gérard Huet
- Area^{1}: 4 km^{2} (1.5 sq mi)
- Elevation: 120 m (390 ft)
- Highest elevation: 183 m (600 ft)
- Lowest elevation: 155 m (509 ft)
- Population (2023): 105
  - Density: 26/km^{2} (68/sq mi)
- Time zone: UTC+01:00 (CET)
  - Summer (DST): UTC+02:00 (CEST)
- INSEE/Postal code: 28242 /28120
- ^{1} French Land Register data, which excludes lakes, ponds, glaciers > 1 km^{2} (0.386 sq mi or 247 acres) and river estuaries.

Méréglise (French pronunciation: [meʁeɡliz]) is a commune in the Eure-et-Loir department in northern France.

== Population ==
Historical population
Year	Pop.	±% p.a.
1968	85	—
1975	67	−3.34%
1982	65	−0.43%
1990	74	+1.63%
1999	70	−0.62%
2007	87	+2.75%
2012	103	+3.43%
2017	100	−0.59%
2023	105	+0.82%
Source: INSEE

== See also ==
- Communes of the Eure-et-Loir department
