= Charonville =

- Commune
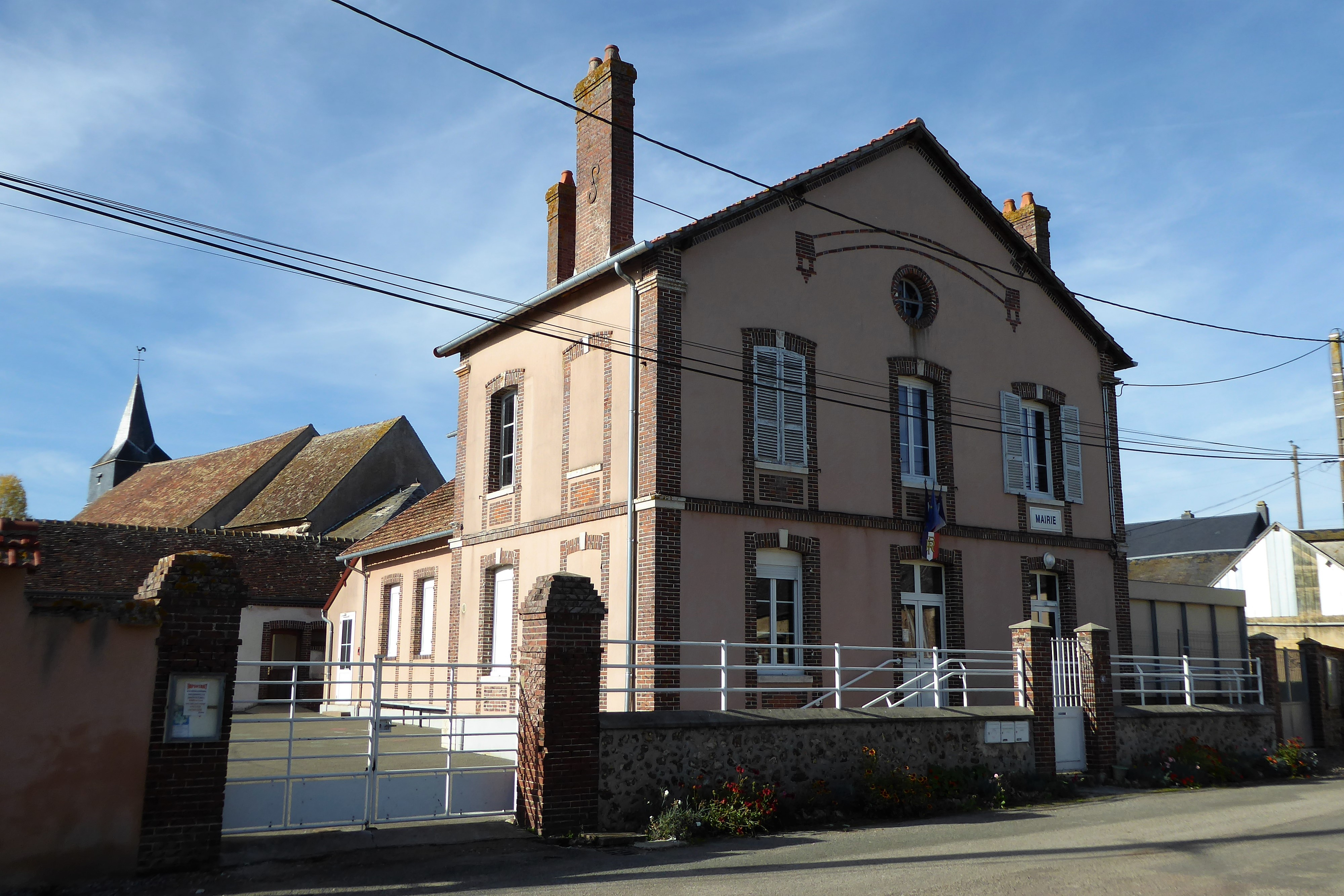
- The town hall in Charonville
- Location of Charonville
- Location within France Location within Centre-Val de Loire
- Coordinates: 48°16′52″N 1°18′17″E
- Country: France
- Region: Centre-Val de Loire
- Department: Eure-et-Loir
- Arrondissement: Chartres
- Canton: Illiers-Combray

Government
  - Mayor (2020–2026): Cyril Lucas
- Area^{1}: 9.66 km^{2} (3.73 sq mi)
- Elevation: 145 m (476 ft)
- Highest elevation: 162 m (531 ft)
- Lowest elevation: 137 m (449 ft)
- Population (2023): 293
  - Density: 30.3/km^{2} (78.6/sq mi)
- Time zone: UTC+01:00 (CET)
  - Summer (DST): UTC+02:00 (CEST)
- INSEE/Postal code: 28081 /28120
- ^{1} French Land Register data, which excludes lakes, ponds, glaciers > 1 km^{2} (0.386 sq mi or 247 acres) and river estuaries.

Charonville (French pronunciation: [ʃaʁɔ̃vil]) is a commune in the Eure-et-Loir department in northern France.

== Population ==
Historical population
Year	Pop.	±% p.a.
1968	235	—
1975	231	−0.24%
1982	272	+2.36%
1990	244	−1.35%
1999	237	−0.32%
2007	236	−0.05%
2012	312	+5.74%
2017	315	+0.19%
2023	293	−1.20%
Source: INSEE

== See also ==
- Communes of the Eure-et-Loir department
