= Chauffours =

- Commune
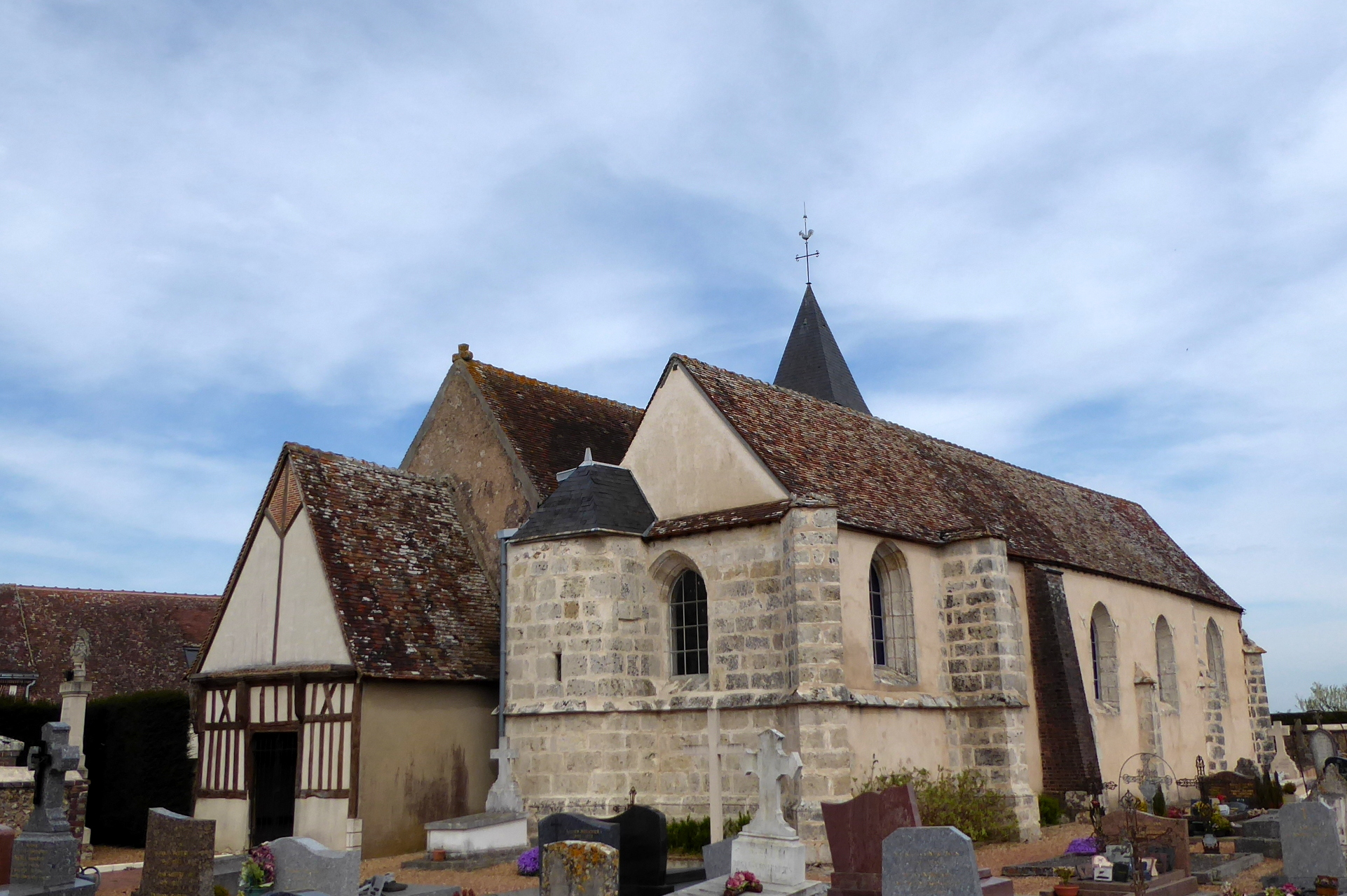
- The church in Chauffours
- Location of Chauffours
- Location within France Location within Centre-Val de Loire
- Coordinates: 48°23′46″N 1°20′51″E
- Country: France
- Region: Centre-Val de Loire
- Department: Eure-et-Loir
- Arrondissement: Chartres
- Canton: Illiers-Combray
- Intercommunality: CA Chartres Métropole

Government
  - Mayor (2020–2026): Thierry Deseyne
- Area^{1}: 7.5 km^{2} (2.9 sq mi)
- Elevation: 182 m (597 ft)
- Highest elevation: 168 m (551 ft)
- Lowest elevation: 146 m (479 ft)
- Population (2023): 292
  - Density: 39/km^{2} (100/sq mi)
- Time zone: UTC+01:00 (CET)
  - Summer (DST): UTC+02:00 (CEST)
- INSEE/Postal code: 28095 /28120
- ^{1} French Land Register data, which excludes lakes, ponds, glaciers > 1 km^{2} (0.386 sq mi or 247 acres) and river estuaries.

Chauffours (French pronunciation: [ʃofuʁ]) is a commune in the Eure-et-Loir department in northern France.

== Population ==
Historical population
Year	Pop.	±% p.a.
1968	159	—
1975	158	−0.09%
1982	236	+5.90%
1990	244	+0.42%
1999	265	+0.92%
2007	288	+1.05%
2012	284	−0.28%
2017	276	−0.57%
2023	292	+0.94%
Source: INSEE

== See also ==
- Communes of the Eure-et-Loir department
