= Billancelles =

- Commune
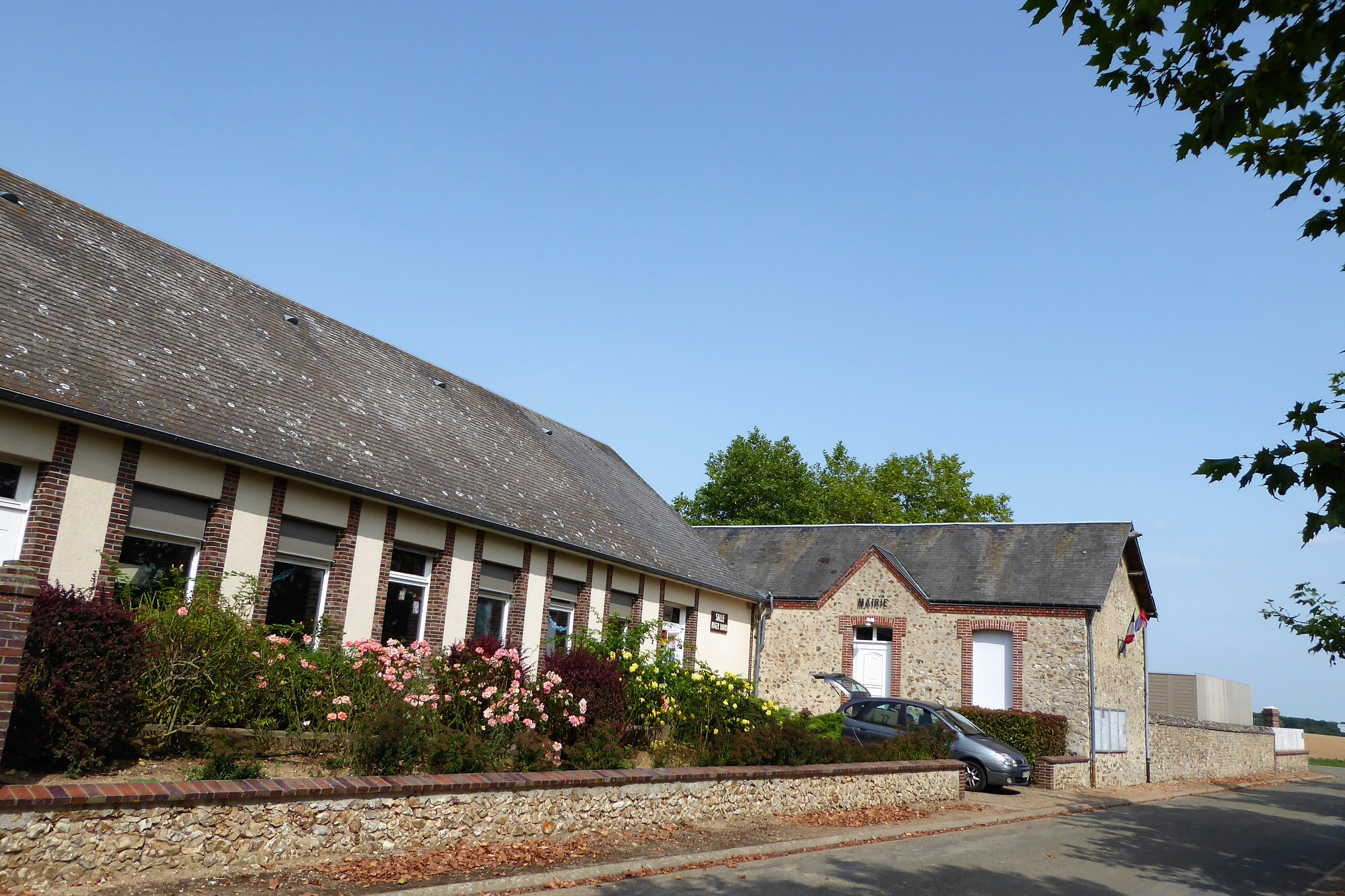
- The town hall in Billancelles
- Location of Billancelles
- Location within France Location within Centre-Val de Loire
- Coordinates: 48°29′17″N 1°12′57″E
- Country: France
- Region: Centre-Val de Loire
- Department: Eure-et-Loir
- Arrondissement: Chartres
- Canton: Illiers-Combray

Government
  - Mayor (2020–2026): Josette Mouton
- Area^{1}: 11.95 km^{2} (4.61 sq mi)
- Elevation: 195 m (640 ft)
- Highest elevation: 222 m (728 ft)
- Lowest elevation: 181 m (594 ft)
- Population (2023): 310
  - Density: 26/km^{2} (67/sq mi)
- Time zone: UTC+01:00 (CET)
  - Summer (DST): UTC+02:00 (CEST)
- INSEE/Postal code: 28040 /28190
- ^{1} French Land Register data, which excludes lakes, ponds, glaciers > 1 km^{2} (0.386 sq mi or 247 acres) and river estuaries.

Billancelles (French pronunciation: [bijɑ̃sɛl]) is a commune in the Eure-et-Loir department in northern France.

== Population ==
Historical population
Year	Pop.	±% p.a.
1968	217	—
1975	191	−1.81%
1982	192	+0.07%
1990	216	+1.48%
1999	213	−0.16%
2007	261	+2.57%
2012	306	+3.23%
2017	324	+1.15%
2023	310	−0.73%
Source: INSEE

== See also ==
- Communes of the Eure-et-Loir department
