= Magny, Eure-et-Loir =

Magny
- Commune
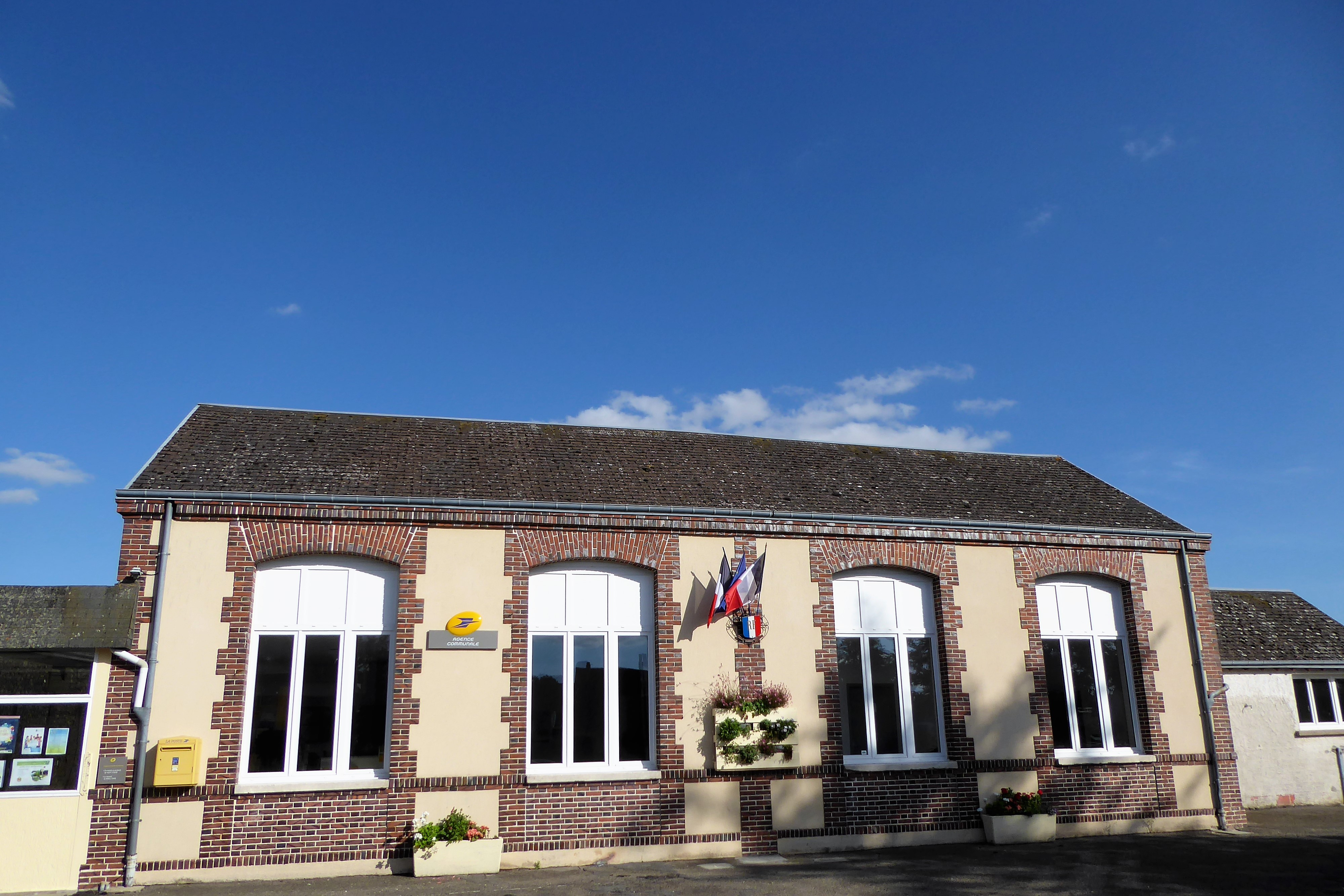
- The town hall in Magny

- Coat of arms
- Location of Magny
- Location within France Location within Centre-Val de Loire
- Coordinates: 48°21′00″N 1°15′50″E
- Country: France
- Region: Centre-Val de Loire
- Department: Eure-et-Loir
- Arrondissement: Chartres
- Canton: Illiers-Combray
- Intercommunality: Entre Beauce et Perche

Government
  - Mayor (2020–2026): Frédéric Delestre
- Area^{1}: 13.03 km^{2} (5.03 sq mi)
- Elevation: 172 m (564 ft)
- Highest elevation: 192 m (630 ft)
- Lowest elevation: 159 m (522 ft)
- Population (2023): 664
  - Density: 51.0/km^{2} (132/sq mi)
- Time zone: UTC+01:00 (CET)
  - Summer (DST): UTC+02:00 (CEST)
- INSEE/Postal code: 28225 /28120
- ^{1} French Land Register data, which excludes lakes, ponds, glaciers > 1 km^{2} (0.386 sq mi or 247 acres) and river estuaries.

Magny (French pronunciation: [maɲi]) is a commune in the Eure-et-Loir department in northern France.

== Population ==
Historical population
Year	Pop.	±% p.a.
1968	366	—
1975	372	+0.23%
1982	438	+2.36%
1990	539	+2.63%
1999	517	−0.46%
2007	641	+2.72%
2012	653	+0.37%
2017	653	+0.00%
2023	664	+0.28%
Source: INSEE

== See also ==
- Communes of the Eure-et-Loir department
