= Dangers, Eure-et-Loir =

Dangers
- Commune
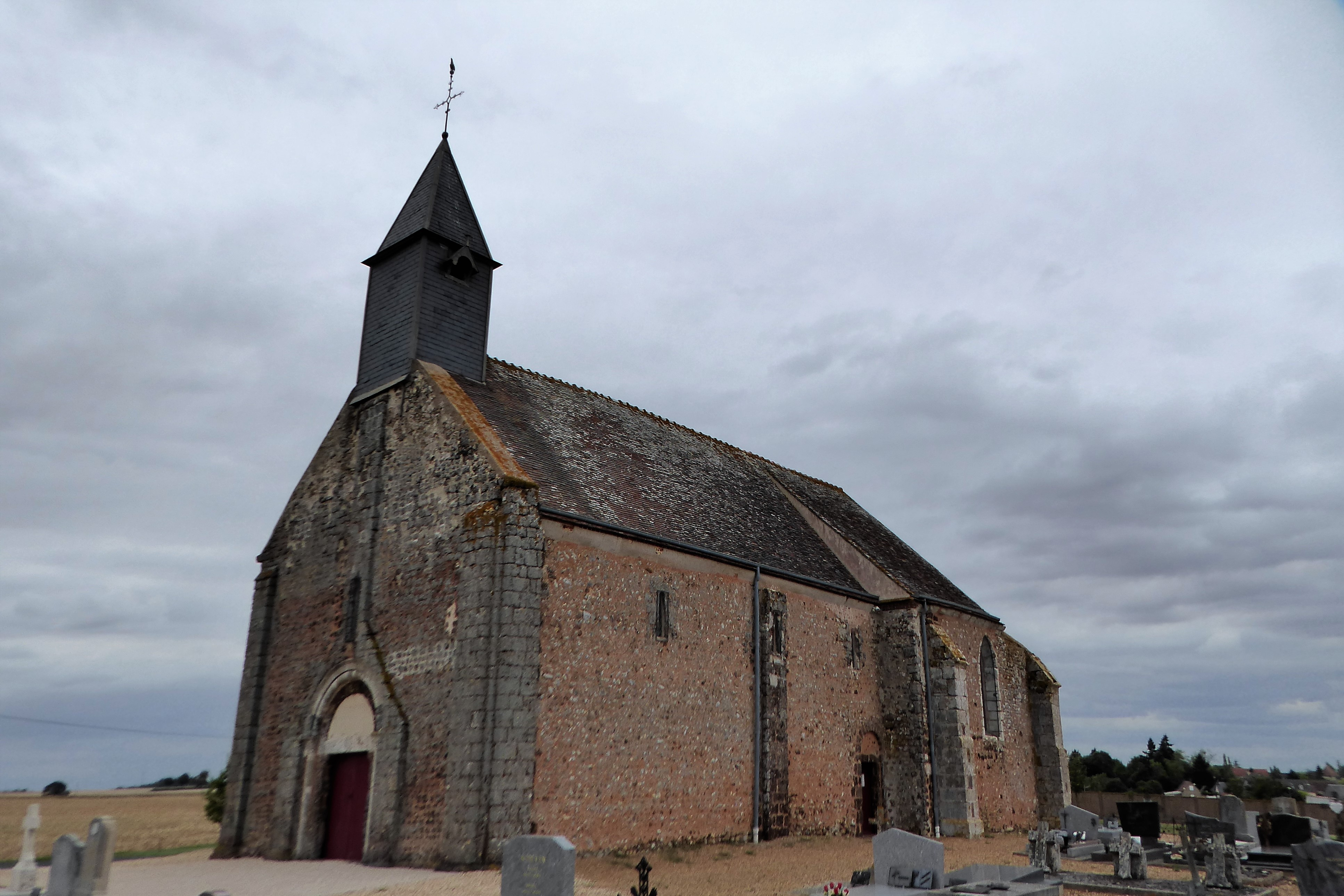
- The church in Dangers
- Location of Dangers
- Location within France Location within Centre-Val de Loire
- Coordinates: 48°30′34″N 1°21′04″E
- Country: France
- Region: Centre-Val de Loire
- Department: Eure-et-Loir
- Arrondissement: Chartres
- Canton: Illiers-Combray
- Intercommunality: CA Chartres Métropole

Government
  - Mayor (2020–2026): André Bellamy
- Area^{1}: 7.39 km^{2} (2.85 sq mi)
- Elevation: 199 m (653 ft)
- Highest elevation: 223 m (732 ft)
- Lowest elevation: 182 m (597 ft)
- Population (2023): 433
  - Density: 58.6/km^{2} (152/sq mi)
- Time zone: UTC+01:00 (CET)
  - Summer (DST): UTC+02:00 (CEST)
- INSEE/Postal code: 28128 /28190
- ^{1} French Land Register data, which excludes lakes, ponds, glaciers > 1 km^{2} (0.386 sq mi or 247 acres) and river estuaries.

Dangers (French pronunciation: [dɑ̃ʒe]) is a commune in the Eure-et-Loir department in northern France.

== Population ==
Historical population
Year	Pop.	±% p.a.
1968	209	—
1975	266	+3.51%
1982	315	+2.44%
1990	328	+0.51%
1999	382	+1.71%
2007	406	+0.76%
2012	431	+1.20%
2017	432	+0.05%
2023	433	+0.04%
Source: INSEE

== See also ==
- Communes of the Eure-et-Loir department
