= Sandarville =

- Commune
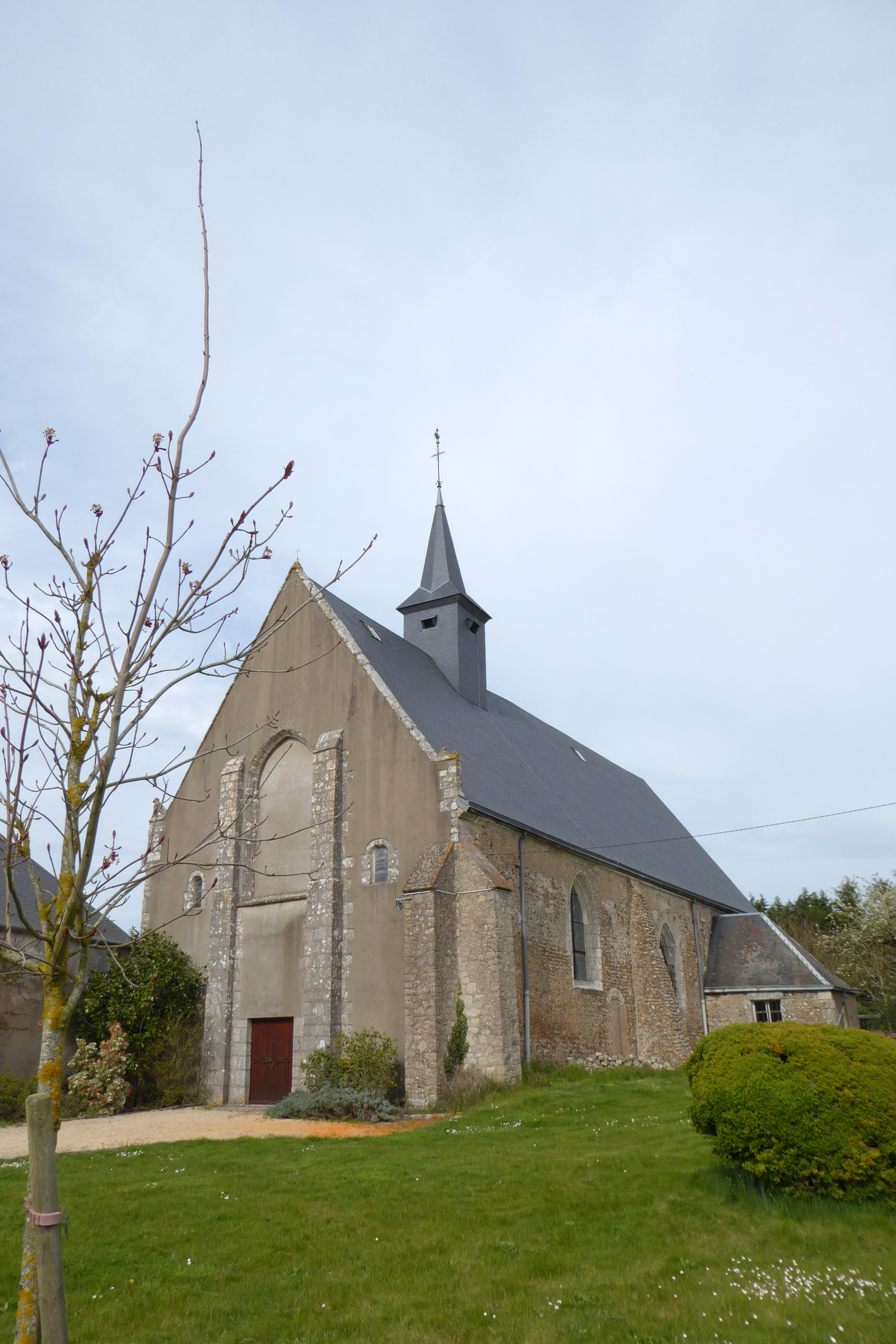
- The church in Sandarville

- Coat of arms
- Location of Sandarville
- Location within France Location within Centre-Val de Loire
- Coordinates: 48°20′55″N 1°21′10″E
- Country: France
- Region: Centre-Val de Loire
- Department: Eure-et-Loir
- Arrondissement: Chartres
- Canton: Illiers-Combray
- Intercommunality: CA Chartres Métropole

Government
  - Mayor (2020–2026): Paul Biney
- Area^{1}: 9.51 km^{2} (3.67 sq mi)
- Elevation: 170 m (560 ft)
- Highest elevation: 176 m (577 ft)
- Lowest elevation: 159 m (522 ft)
- Population (2023): 423
  - Density: 44.5/km^{2} (115/sq mi)
- Time zone: UTC+01:00 (CET)
  - Summer (DST): UTC+02:00 (CEST)
- INSEE/Postal code: 28365 /28120
- ^{1} French Land Register data, which excludes lakes, ponds, glaciers > 1 km^{2} (0.386 sq mi or 247 acres) and river estuaries.

Sandarville (French pronunciation: [sɑ̃daʁvil]) is a commune in the Eure-et-Loir department in northern France.

== Population ==
Historical population

Year	Pop.	±% p.a.
1793	388	—
1821	384	−0.04%
1846	403	+0.19%
1872	391	−0.12%
1901	345	−0.43%
1926	310	−0.43%
1946	315	+0.08%
1962	250	−1.43%
1968	243	−0.47%

Year	Pop.	±% p.a.
1975	235	−0.48%
1982	234	−0.06%
1990	282	+2.36%
1999	342	+2.17%
2007	385	+1.49%
2012	382	−0.16%
2017	408	+1.33%
2023	423	+0.60%

Source: EHESS and INSEE (1968-2023)

== See also ==
- Communes of the Eure-et-Loir department
