= Ermenonville-la-Petite =

- Commune
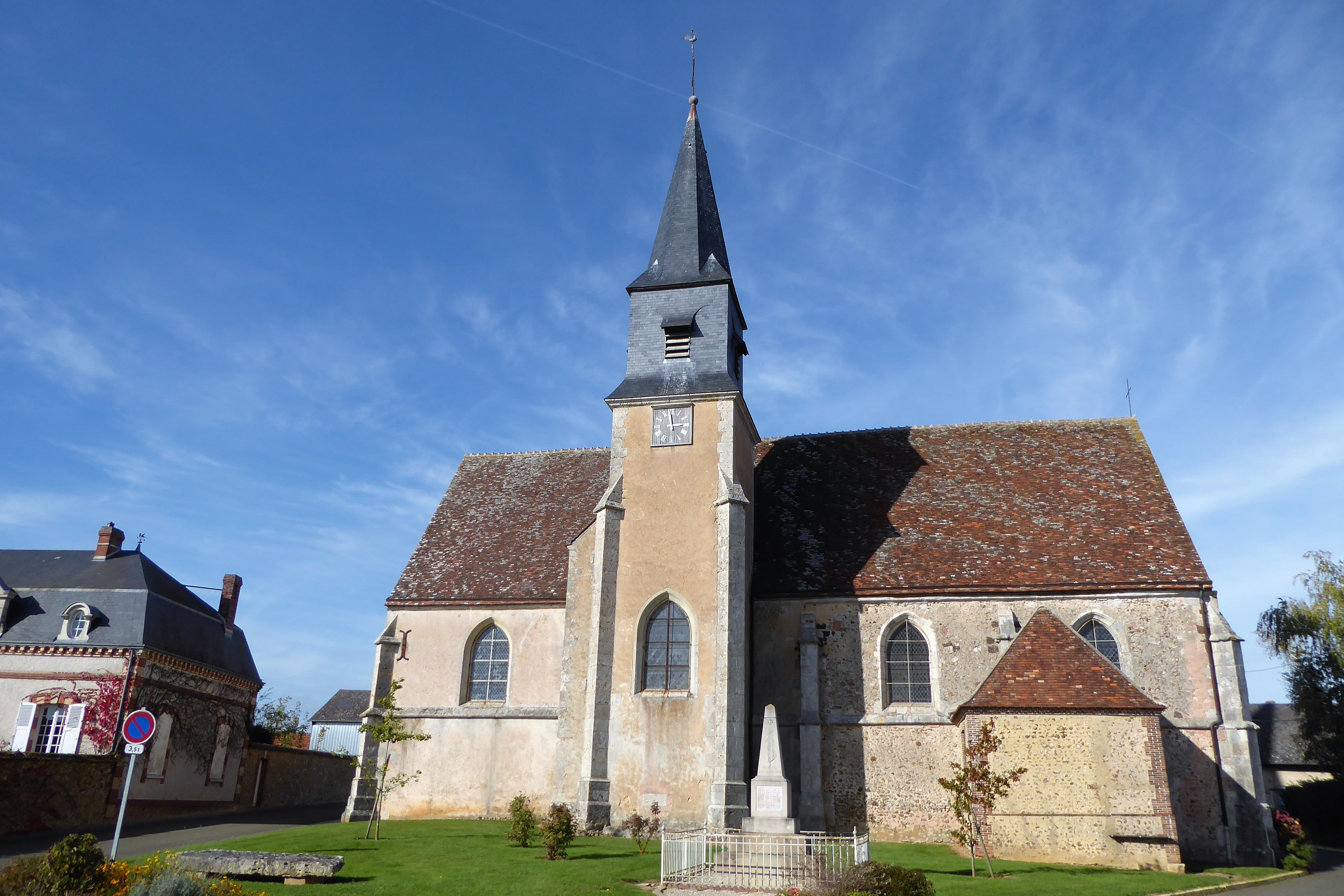
- The church in Ermenonville-la-Petite
- Location of Ermenonville-la-Petite
- Location within France Location within Centre-Val de Loire
- Coordinates: 48°17′48″N 1°21′10″E
- Country: France
- Region: Centre-Val de Loire
- Department: Eure-et-Loir
- Arrondissement: Chartres
- Canton: Illiers-Combray

Government
  - Mayor (2020–2026): Vincent Carnis
- Area^{1}: 5.12 km^{2} (1.98 sq mi)
- Elevation: 160 m (520 ft)
- Highest elevation: 162 m (531 ft)
- Lowest elevation: 134 m (440 ft)
- Population (2023): 192
  - Density: 37.5/km^{2} (97.1/sq mi)
- Time zone: UTC+01:00 (CET)
  - Summer (DST): UTC+02:00 (CEST)
- INSEE/Postal code: 28142 /28120
- ^{1} French Land Register data, which excludes lakes, ponds, glaciers > 1 km^{2} (0.386 sq mi or 247 acres) and river estuaries.

Ermenonville-la-Petite (French pronunciation: [ɛʁmənɔ̃vil la pətit]) is a commune in the Eure-et-Loir department in northern France.

== Population ==
Historical population
Year	Pop.	±% p.a.
1968	146	—
1975	120	−2.76%
1982	135	+1.70%
1990	160	+2.15%
1999	159	−0.07%
2007	183	+1.77%
2012	175	−0.89%
2017	191	+1.77%
2023	192	+0.09%
Source: INSEE

== See also ==
- Communes of the Eure-et-Loir department
