= Saint-Georges-sur-Eure =

- Commune
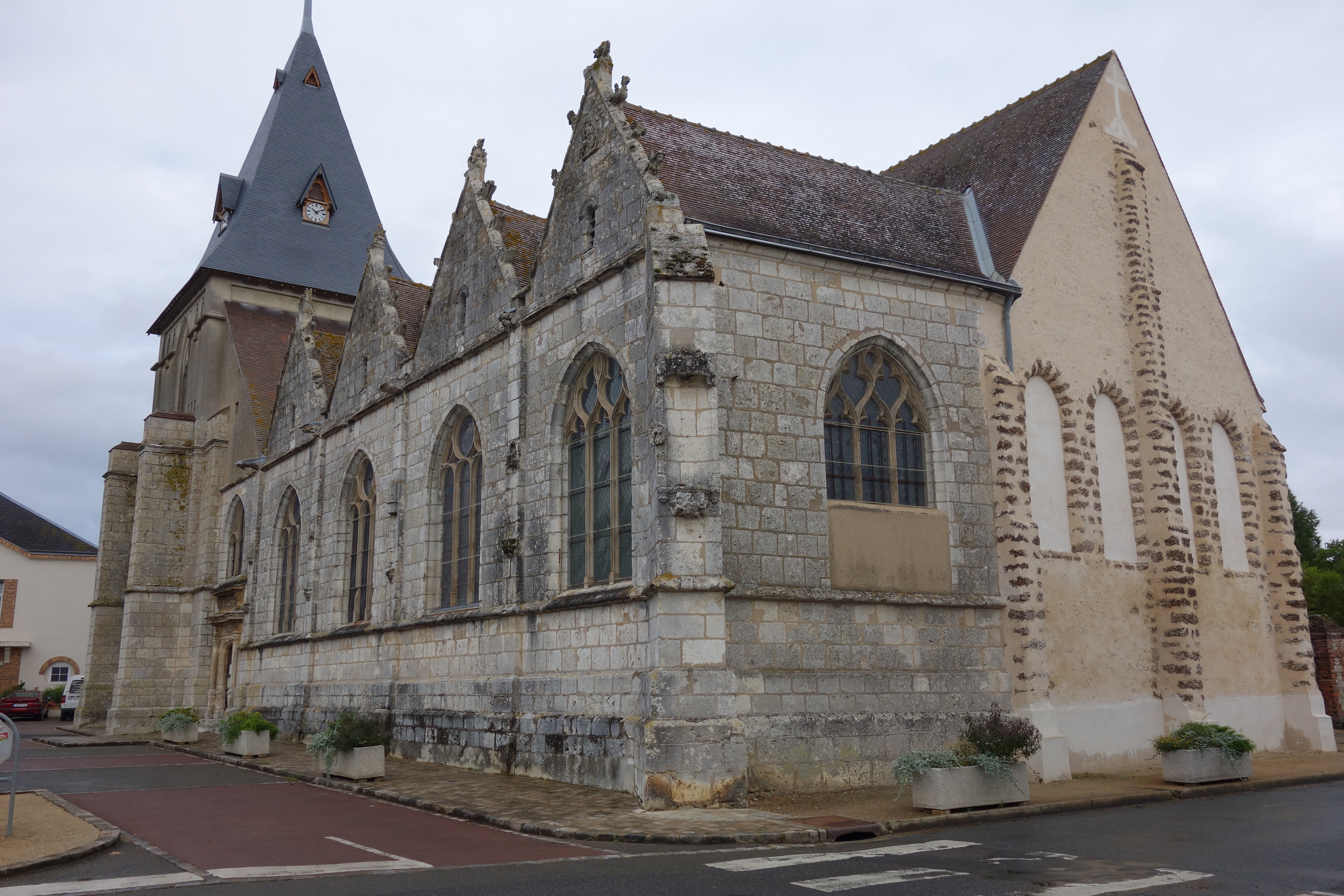
- The church in Saint-Georges-sur-Eure

- Coat of arms
- Location of Saint-Georges-sur-Eure
- Location within France Location within Centre-Val de Loire
- Coordinates: 48°25′06″N 1°21′34″E
- Country: France
- Region: Centre-Val de Loire
- Department: Eure-et-Loir
- Arrondissement: Chartres
- Canton: Illiers-Combray
- Intercommunality: CA Chartres Métropole

Government
  - Mayor (2020–2026): Jacky Gaullier
- Area^{1}: 15.43 km^{2} (5.96 sq mi)
- Elevation: 146 m (479 ft)
- Highest elevation: 165 m (541 ft)
- Lowest elevation: 141 m (463 ft)
- Population (2023): 2,797
  - Density: 181.3/km^{2} (469.5/sq mi)
- Time zone: UTC+01:00 (CET)
  - Summer (DST): UTC+02:00 (CEST)
- INSEE/Postal code: 28337 /28190
- ^{1} French Land Register data, which excludes lakes, ponds, glaciers > 1 km^{2} (0.386 sq mi or 247 acres) and river estuaries.

Saint-Georges-sur-Eure (French pronunciation: [sɛ̃ ʒɔʁʒ syʁ œʁ], literally Saint-Georges on Eure) is a commune in the Eure-et-Loir department in northern France.

== Population ==
Historical population
| Year | Pop. | ±% p.a. |
|---|---|---|
| 1968 | 1,233 | — |
| 1975 | 1,734 | +4.99% |
| 1982 | 2,039 | +2.34% |
| 1990 | 2,254 | +1.26% |
| 1999 | 2,445 | +0.91% |
| 2007 | 2,514 | +0.35% |
| 2012 | 2,431 | −0.67% |
| 2017 | 2,803 | +2.89% |
| 2023 | 2,797 | −0.04% |
Source: INSEE

== See also ==
- Communes of the Eure-et-Loir department
