= Friaize =

- Commune
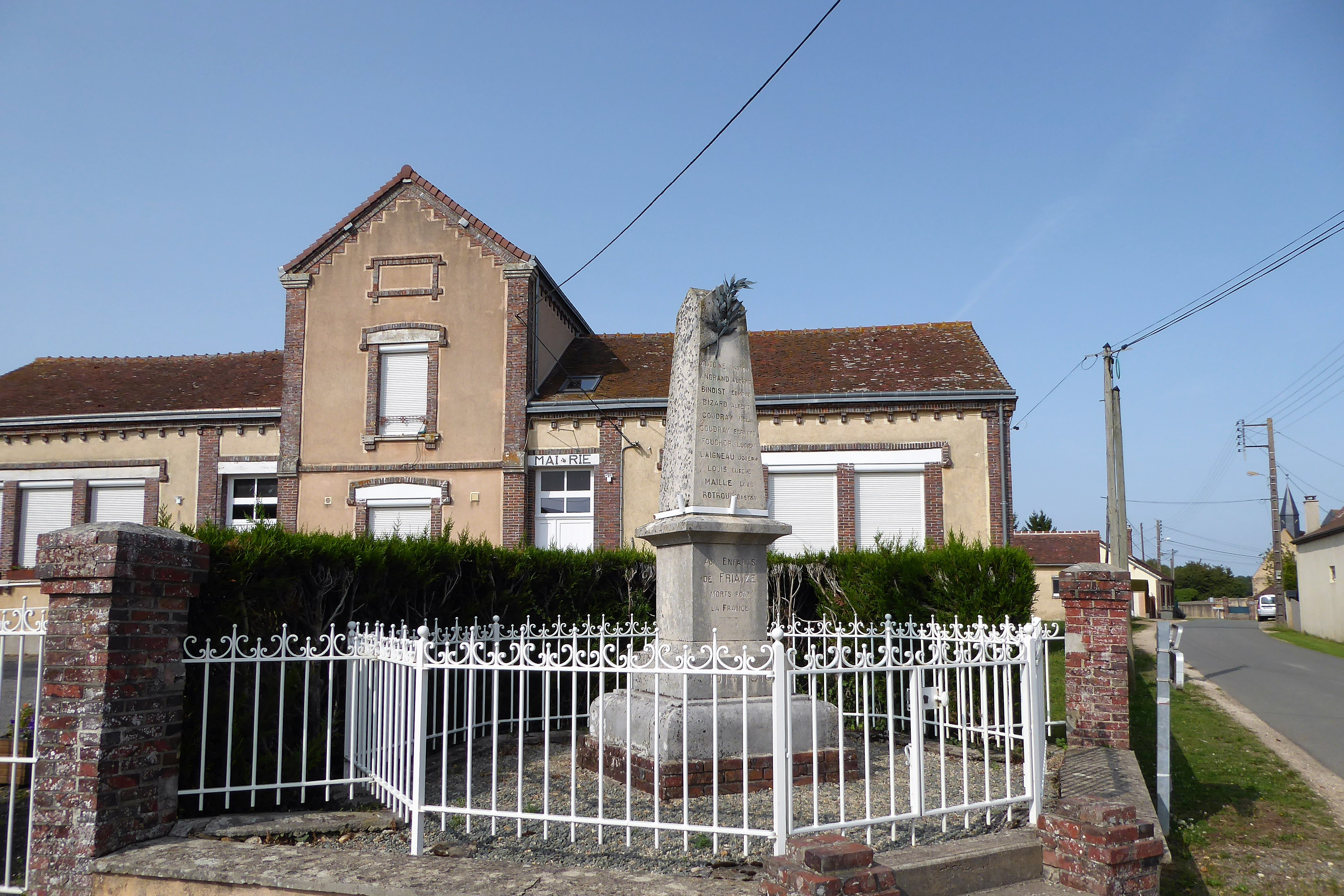
- The war memorial and town hall in Friaize
- Location of Friaize
- Location within France Location within Centre-Val de Loire
- Coordinates: 48°25′56″N 1°08′06″E
- Country: France
- Region: Centre-Val de Loire
- Department: Eure-et-Loir
- Arrondissement: Nogent-le-Rotrou
- Canton: Illiers-Combray

Government
  - Mayor (2020–2026): Michelle Elleaume
- Area^{1}: 10.53 km^{2} (4.07 sq mi)
- Elevation: 252 m (827 ft)
- Highest elevation: 247 m (810 ft)
- Lowest elevation: 199 m (653 ft)
- Population (2023): 256
  - Density: 24.3/km^{2} (63.0/sq mi)
- Time zone: UTC+01:00 (CET)
  - Summer (DST): UTC+02:00 (CEST)
- INSEE/Postal code: 28166 /28240
- ^{1} French Land Register data, which excludes lakes, ponds, glaciers > 1 km^{2} (0.386 sq mi or 247 acres) and river estuaries.

Friaize (French pronunciation: [fʁijɛz]) is a commune in the Eure-et-Loir department in northern France.

== Geography ==
The Commune along with another 70 communes shares part of a 47,681 hectare, Natura 2000 conservation area, called the Forêts et étangs du Perche.

== Population ==
Historical population
Year	Pop.	±% p.a.
1968	221	—
1975	194	−1.84%
1982	194	+0.00%
1990	193	−0.06%
1999	204	+0.62%
2007	205	+0.06%
2012	233	+2.59%
2017	244	+0.93%
2023	256	+0.80%
Source: INSEE

== See also ==
- Communes of the Eure-et-Loir department
