= Cernay, Eure-et-Loir =

Cernay
- Commune
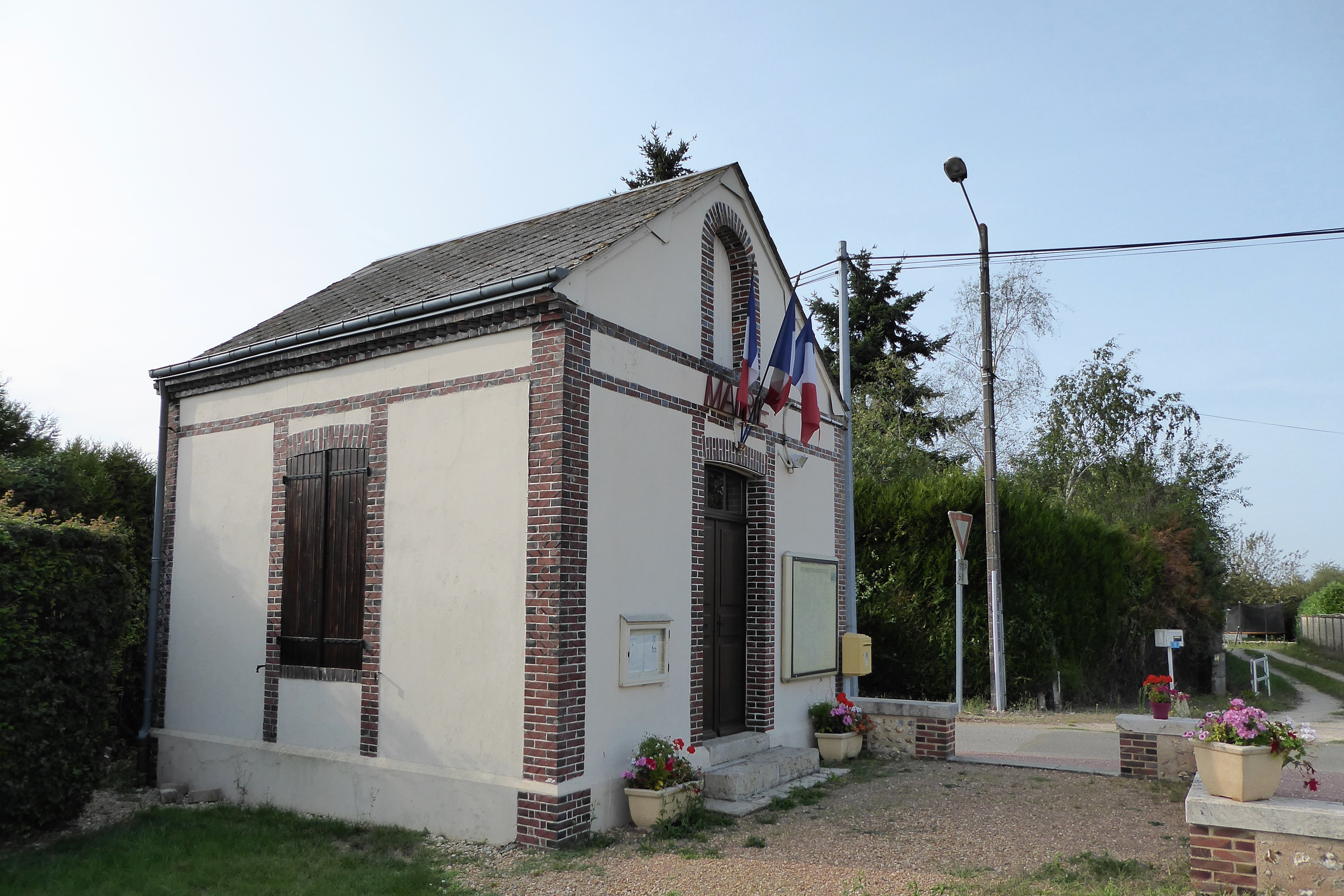
- The town hall in Cernay
- Location of Cernay
- Location within France Location within Centre-Val de Loire
- Coordinates: 48°23′07″N 1°14′34″E
- Country: France
- Region: Centre-Val de Loire
- Department: Eure-et-Loir
- Arrondissement: Chartres
- Canton: Illiers-Combray

Government
  - Mayor (2020–2026): Marie-Paule Dos Reis
- Area^{1}: 7.89 km^{2} (3.05 sq mi)
- Elevation: 185 m (607 ft)
- Highest elevation: 201 m (659 ft)
- Lowest elevation: 171 m (561 ft)
- Population (2023): 80
  - Density: 10/km^{2} (26/sq mi)
- Time zone: UTC+01:00 (CET)
  - Summer (DST): UTC+02:00 (CEST)
- INSEE/Postal code: 28067 /28120
- ^{1} French Land Register data, which excludes lakes, ponds, glaciers > 1 km^{2} (0.386 sq mi or 247 acres) and river estuaries.

Cernay (French pronunciation: [sɛʁnɛ]) is a commune in the Eure-et-Loir department in northern France.

== Population ==
Historical population
Year	Pop.	±% p.a.
1968	68	—
1975	61	−1.54%
1982	73	+2.60%
1990	71	−0.35%
1999	71	+0.00%
2007	78	+1.18%
2012	83	+1.25%
2017	89	+1.41%
2023	80	−1.76%
Source: INSEE

== See also ==
- Communes of the Eure-et-Loir department
