= Saint-Luperce =

- Commune
- Location of Saint-Luperce
- Location within France Location within Centre-Val de Loire
- Coordinates: 48°26′12″N 1°19′02″E
- Country: France
- Region: Centre-Val de Loire
- Department: Eure-et-Loir
- Arrondissement: Chartres
- Canton: Illiers-Combray

Government
  - Mayor (2020–2026): Pierrette Salmon
- Area^{1}: 14.35 km^{2} (5.54 sq mi)
- Elevation: 100 m (330 ft)
- Highest elevation: 176 m (577 ft)
- Lowest elevation: 148 m (486 ft)
- Population (2023): 1,005
  - Density: 70.03/km^{2} (181.4/sq mi)
- Time zone: UTC+01:00 (CET)
  - Summer (DST): UTC+02:00 (CEST)
- INSEE/Postal code: 28350 /28190
- ^{1} French Land Register data, which excludes lakes, ponds, glaciers > 1 km^{2} (0.386 sq mi or 247 acres) and river estuaries.

Saint-Luperce (French pronunciation: [sɛ̃ lypɛʁs]) is a commune in the Eure-et-Loir department in northern France.

== Population ==
Historical population
Year	Pop.	±% p.a.
1968	514	—
1975	530	+0.44%
1982	665	+3.29%
1990	757	+1.63%
1999	850	+1.30%
2007	884	+0.49%
2012	868	−0.36%
2017	896	+0.64%
2023	1,005	+1.93%
Source: INSEE

== See also ==
- Communes of the Eure-et-Loir department
