= Meslay-le-Grenet =

- Commune
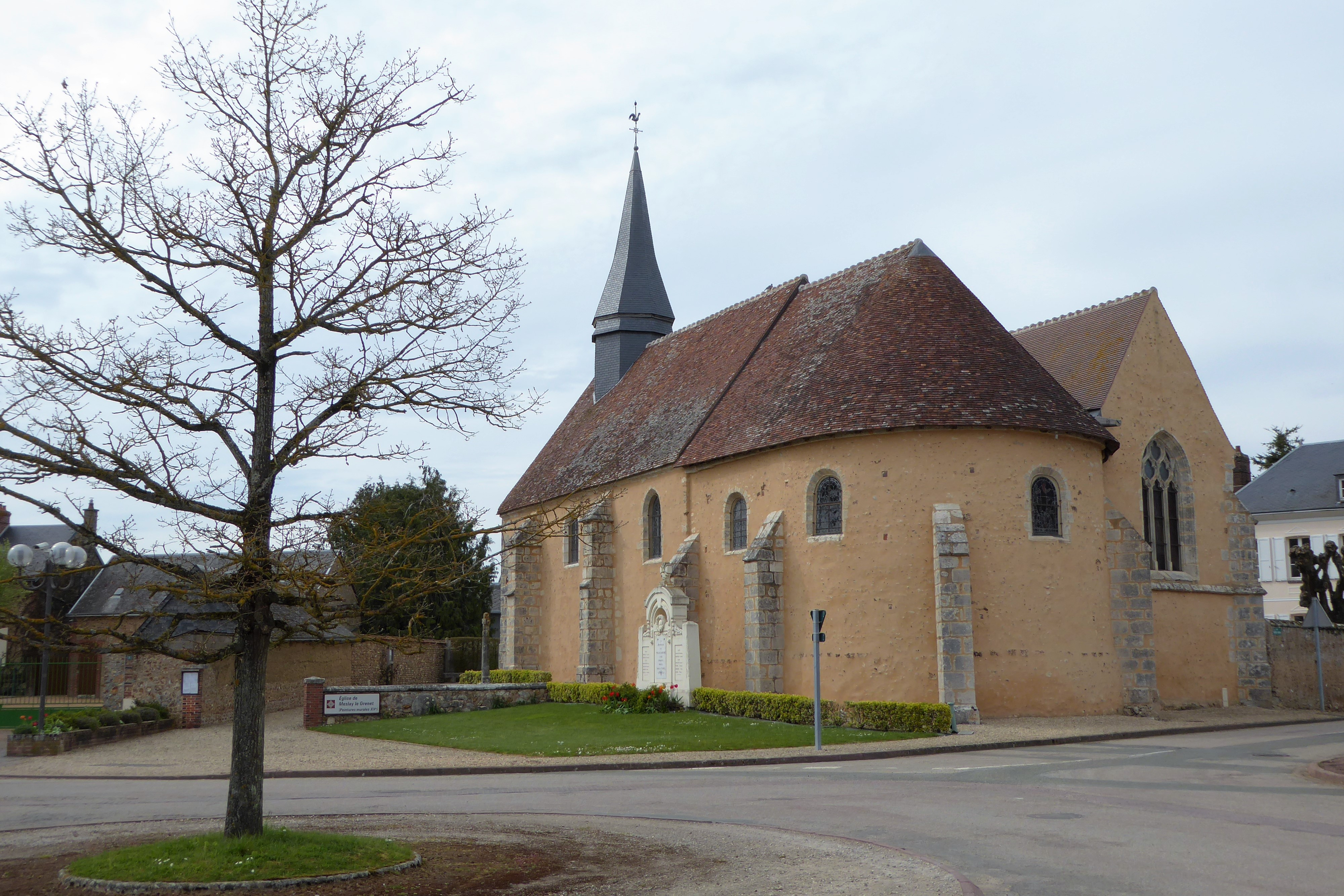
- The church in Meslay-le-Grenet
- Location of Meslay-le-Grenet
- Location within France Location within Centre-Val de Loire
- Coordinates: 48°22′06″N 1°23′00″E
- Country: France
- Region: Centre-Val de Loire
- Department: Eure-et-Loir
- Arrondissement: Chartres
- Canton: Illiers-Combray
- Intercommunality: CA Chartres Métropole

Government
  - Mayor (2020–2026): Gilles Pineau
- Area^{1}: 8.94 km^{2} (3.45 sq mi)
- Elevation: 173 m (568 ft)
- Highest elevation: 174 m (571 ft)
- Lowest elevation: 140 m (460 ft)
- Population (2023): 379
  - Density: 42.4/km^{2} (110/sq mi)
- Time zone: UTC+01:00 (CET)
  - Summer (DST): UTC+02:00 (CEST)
- INSEE/Postal code: 28245 /28120
- ^{1} French Land Register data, which excludes lakes, ponds, glaciers > 1 km^{2} (0.386 sq mi or 247 acres) and river estuaries.

Meslay-le-Grenet (French pronunciation: [mɛlɛ lə ɡʁənɛ]) is a commune in the Eure-et-Loir department in northern France.

== Population ==
Historical population
Year	Pop.	±% p.a.
1968	145	—
1975	166	+1.95%
1982	196	+2.40%
1990	302	+5.55%
1999	335	+1.16%
2007	306	−1.13%
2012	280	−1.76%
2017	345	+4.26%
2023	379	+1.58%
Source: INSEE

== See also ==
- Communes of the Eure-et-Loir department
