= Ermenonville-la-Grande =

- Commune
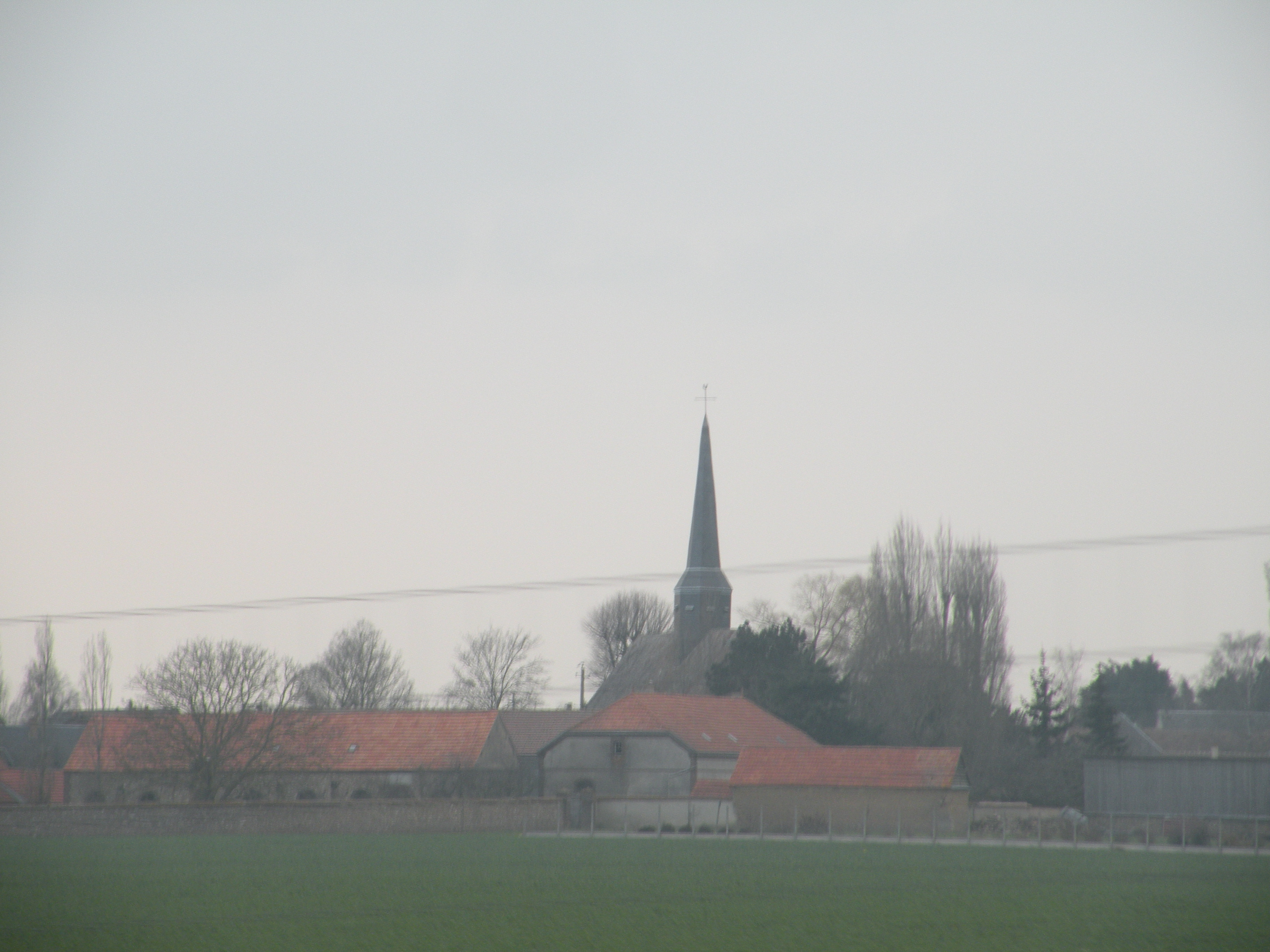
- The church and surroundings in Ermenonville-la-Grande

- Coat of arms
- Location of Ermenonville-la-Grande
- Location within France Location within Centre-Val de Loire
- Coordinates: 48°20′14″N 1°23′00″E
- Country: France
- Region: Centre-Val de Loire
- Department: Eure-et-Loir
- Arrondissement: Chartres
- Canton: Illiers-Combray
- Intercommunality: CA Chartres Métropole

Government
  - Mayor (2020–2026): Fabrice Pelletier
- Area^{1}: 12.07 km^{2} (4.66 sq mi)
- Elevation: 164 m (538 ft)
- Highest elevation: 168 m (551 ft)
- Lowest elevation: 151 m (495 ft)
- Population (2023): 311
  - Density: 25.8/km^{2} (66.7/sq mi)
- Time zone: UTC+01:00 (CET)
  - Summer (DST): UTC+02:00 (CEST)
- INSEE/Postal code: 28141 /28120
- ^{1} French Land Register data, which excludes lakes, ponds, glaciers > 1 km^{2} (0.386 sq mi or 247 acres) and river estuaries.

Ermenonville-la-Grande (French pronunciation: [ɛʁmənɔ̃vil la ɡʁɑ̃d]) is a commune in the Eure-et-Loir department in northern France.

== Population ==
Historical population
Year	Pop.	±% p.a.
1968	196	—
1975	214	+1.26%
1982	216	+0.13%
1990	260	+2.34%
1999	300	+1.60%
2007	324	+0.97%
2012	322	−0.12%
2017	319	−0.19%
2023	311	−0.42%
Source: INSEE

== See also ==
- Communes of the Eure-et-Loir department
