= Les Châtelliers-Notre-Dame =

- Commune
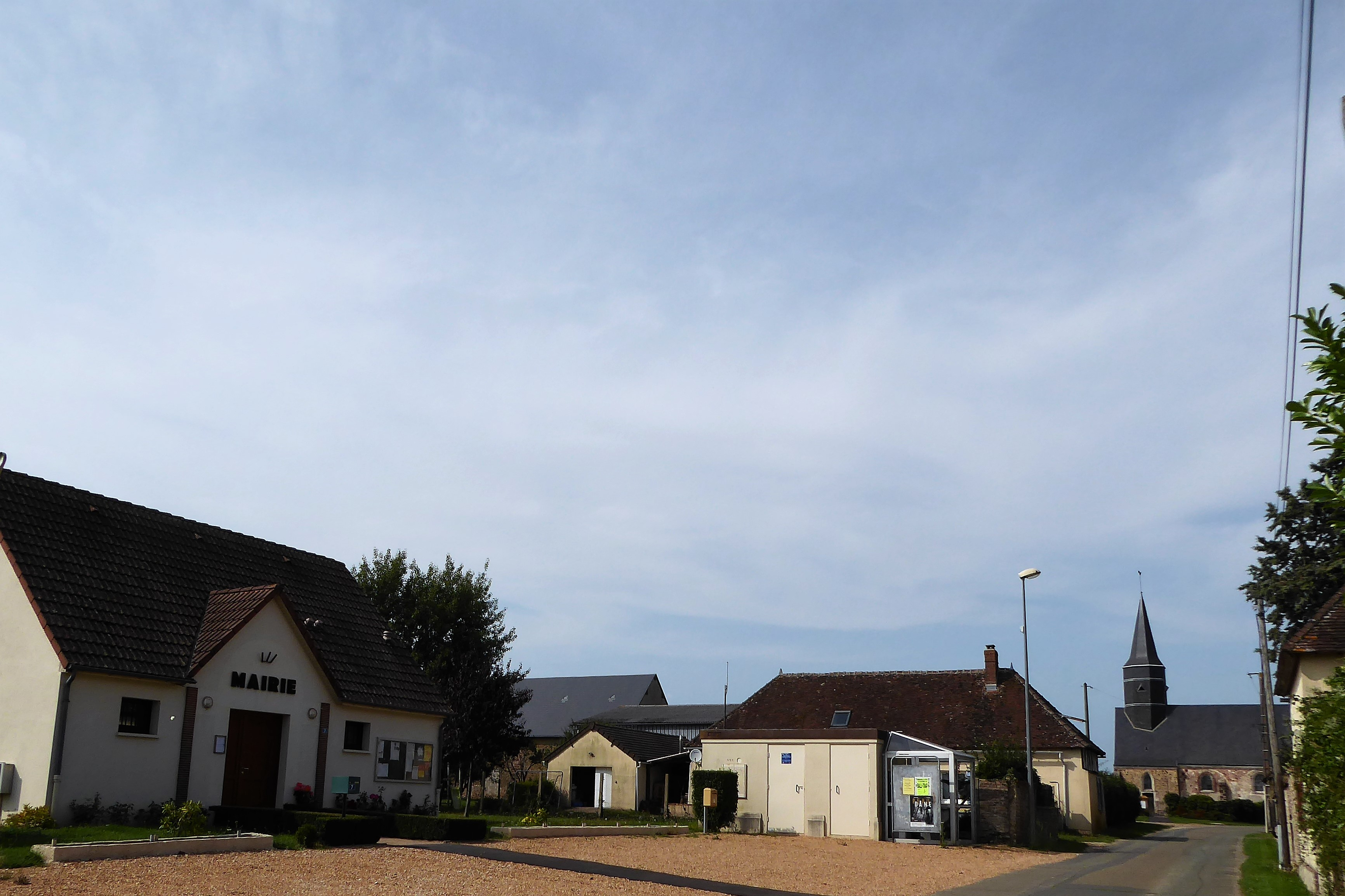
- The town hall and church in Les Châtelliers-Notre-Dame
- Location of Les Châtelliers-Notre-Dame
- Location within France Location within Centre-Val de Loire
- Coordinates: 48°21′00″N 1°12′17″E
- Country: France
- Region: Centre-Val de Loire
- Department: Eure-et-Loir
- Arrondissement: Chartres
- Canton: Illiers-Combray

Government
  - Mayor (2020–2026): Pierre Gigou
- Area^{1}: 10.87 km^{2} (4.20 sq mi)
- Elevation: 206 m (676 ft)
- Highest elevation: 213 m (699 ft)
- Lowest elevation: 159 m (522 ft)
- Population (2023): 148
  - Density: 13.6/km^{2} (35.3/sq mi)
- Time zone: UTC+01:00 (CET)
  - Summer (DST): UTC+02:00 (CEST)
- INSEE/Postal code: 28091 /28120
- ^{1} French Land Register data, which excludes lakes, ponds, glaciers > 1 km^{2} (0.386 sq mi or 247 acres) and river estuaries.

Les Châtelliers-Notre-Dame (French pronunciation: [le ʃatəlje nɔtʁ dam]) is a commune in the Eure-et-Loir department in northern France.

== Population ==
Historical population
Year	Pop.	±% p.a.
1968	115	—
1975	105	−1.29%
1982	110	+0.67%
1990	123	+1.41%
1999	117	−0.55%
2007	130	+1.33%
2012	125	−0.78%
2017	137	+1.85%
2023	148	+1.30%
Source: INSEE

== See also ==
- Communes of the Eure-et-Loir department
