= Vieuvicq =

- Commune
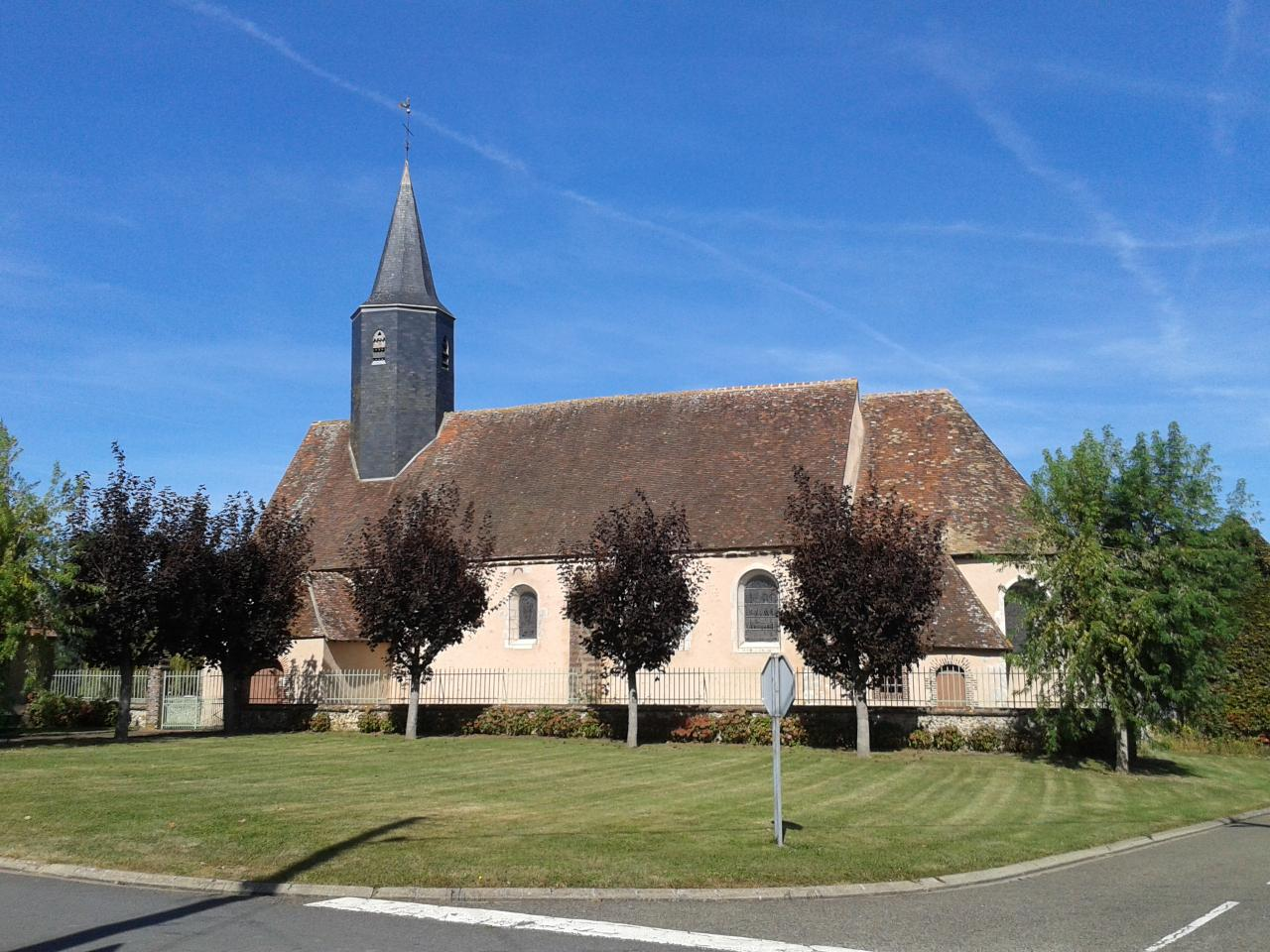
- The church in Vieuvicq
- Location of Vieuvicq
- Location within France Location within Centre-Val de Loire
- Coordinates: 48°15′52″N 1°12′51″E
- Country: France
- Region: Centre-Val de Loire
- Department: Eure-et-Loir
- Arrondissement: Châteaudun
- Canton: Illiers-Combray

Government
  - Mayor (2020–2026): Philippe Morelle
- Area^{1}: 15.62 km^{2} (6.03 sq mi)
- Elevation: 170 m (560 ft)
- Highest elevation: 177 m (581 ft)
- Lowest elevation: 152 m (499 ft)
- Population (2023): 442
  - Density: 28.3/km^{2} (73.3/sq mi)
- Time zone: UTC+01:00 (CET)
  - Summer (DST): UTC+02:00 (CEST)
- INSEE/Postal code: 28409 /28120
- ^{1} French Land Register data, which excludes lakes, ponds, glaciers > 1 km^{2} (0.386 sq mi or 247 acres) and river estuaries.

Vieuvicq (French pronunciation: [vjøvik]) is a commune in the Eure-et-Loir department in northern France.

== Population ==
Historical population
Year	Pop.	±% p.a.
1968	378	—
1975	354	−0.93%
1982	371	+0.67%
1990	359	−0.41%
1999	399	+1.18%
2007	447	+1.43%
2012	464	+0.75%
2017	476	+0.51%
2023	442	−1.23%
Source: INSEE

== See also ==
- Communes of the Eure-et-Loir department
