= Bailleau-le-Pin =

- Commune
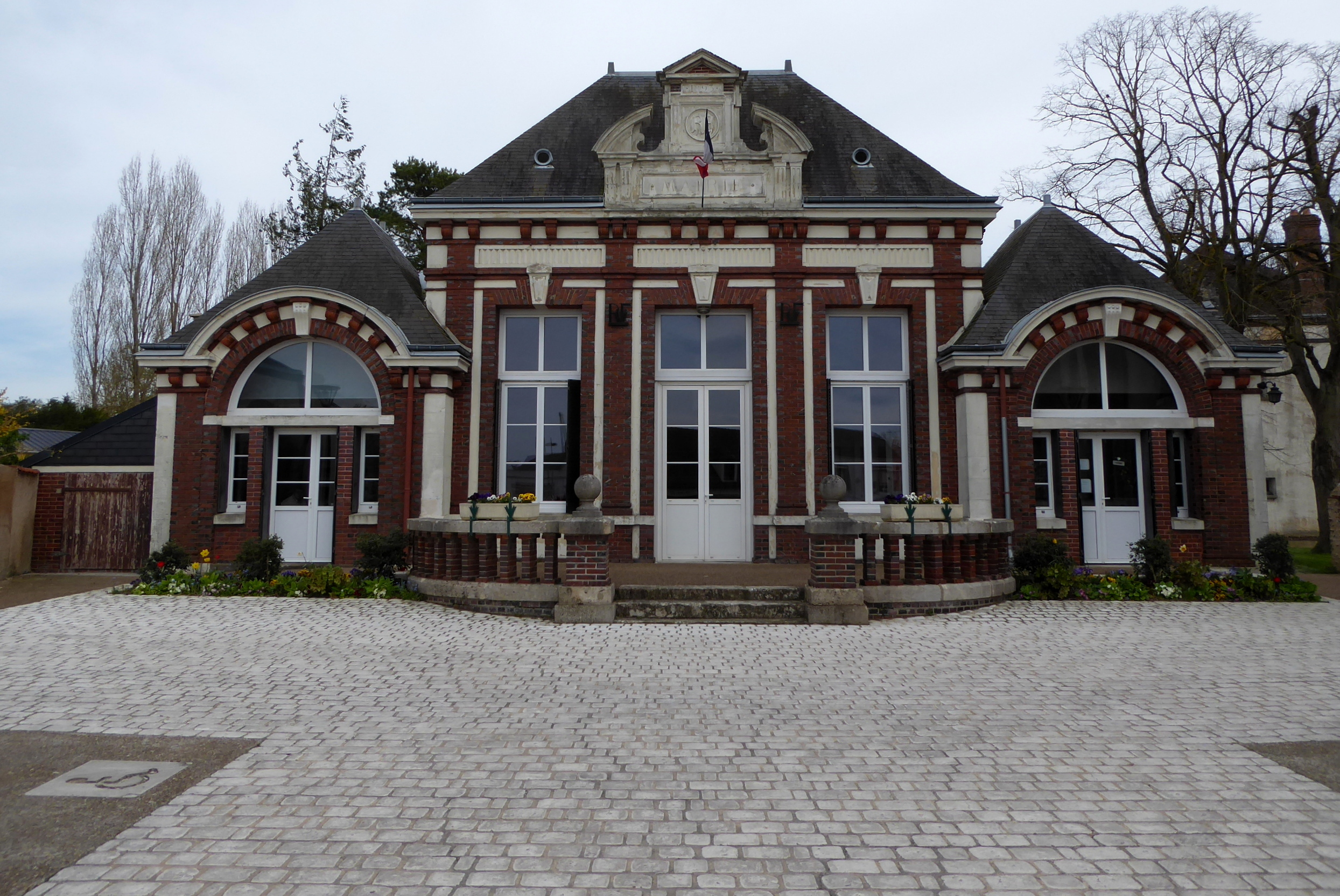
- The town hall in Bailleau-le-Pin
- Location of Bailleau-le-Pin
- Location within France Location within Centre-Val de Loire
- Coordinates: 48°22′04″N 1°19′51″E
- Country: France
- Region: Centre-Val de Loire
- Department: Eure-et-Loir
- Arrondissement: Chartres
- Canton: Illiers-Combray
- Intercommunality: Entre Beauce et Perche

Government
  - Mayor (2020–2026): Martial Lochon
- Area^{1}: 16.54 km^{2} (6.39 sq mi)
- Elevation: 174 m (571 ft)
- Highest elevation: 185 m (607 ft)
- Lowest elevation: 154 m (505 ft)
- Population (2023): 1,684
  - Density: 101.8/km^{2} (263.7/sq mi)
- Time zone: UTC+01:00 (CET)
  - Summer (DST): UTC+02:00 (CEST)
- INSEE/Postal code: 28021 /28120
- ^{1} French Land Register data, which excludes lakes, ponds, glaciers > 1 km^{2} (0.386 sq mi or 247 acres) and river estuaries.

Bailleau-le-Pin (French pronunciation: [bajo lə pɛ̃]) is a commune in the Eure-et-Loir department in northern France.

== Population ==
Historical population
Year	Pop.	±% p.a.
1968	918	—
1975	1,141	+3.16%
1982	1,185	+0.54%
1990	1,495	+2.95%
1999	1,456	−0.29%
2007	1,499	+0.36%
2012	1,506	+0.09%
2017	1,563	+0.75%
2023	1,684	+1.25%
Source: INSEE

== See also ==
- Communes of the Eure-et-Loir department
