= Saint-Germain-le-Gaillard, Eure-et-Loir =

Saint-Germain-le-Gaillard
- Commune
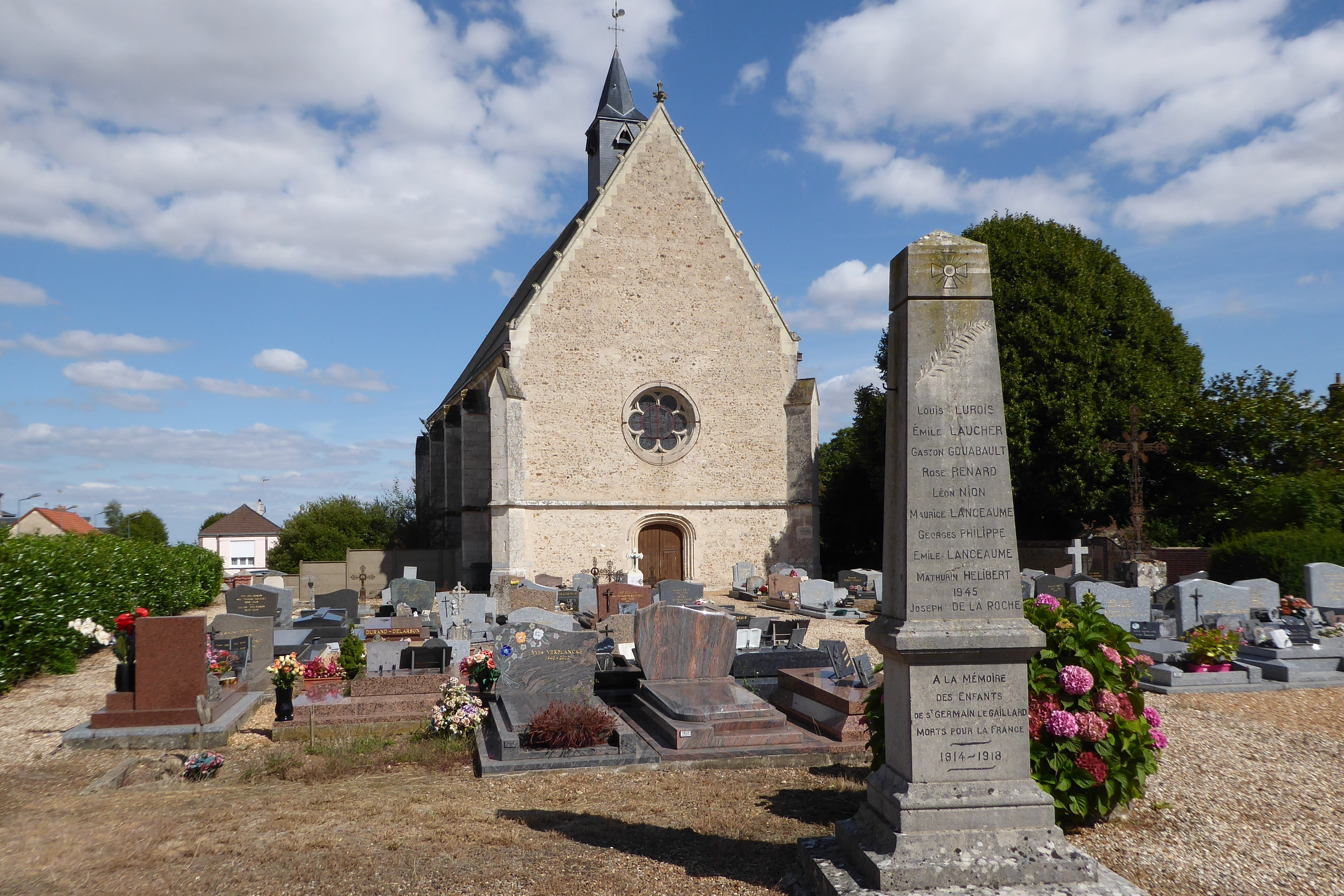
- The church in Saint-Germain-le-Gaillard, Eure-et-Loir
- Location of Saint-Germain-le-Gaillard
- Location within France Location within Centre-Val de Loire
- Coordinates: 48°25′21″N 1°15′33″E
- Country: France
- Region: Centre-Val de Loire
- Department: Eure-et-Loir
- Arrondissement: Chartres
- Canton: Illiers-Combray

Government
  - Mayor (2020–2026): Pascal Aubry
- Area^{1}: 8.13 km^{2} (3.14 sq mi)
- Elevation: 173 m (568 ft)
- Highest elevation: 188 m (617 ft)
- Lowest elevation: 162 m (531 ft)
- Population (2023): 368
  - Density: 45.3/km^{2} (117/sq mi)
- Time zone: UTC+01:00 (CET)
  - Summer (DST): UTC+02:00 (CEST)
- INSEE/Postal code: 28339 /28190
- ^{1} French Land Register data, which excludes lakes, ponds, glaciers > 1 km^{2} (0.386 sq mi or 247 acres) and river estuaries.

Saint-Germain-le-Gaillard (French pronunciation: [sɛ̃ ʒɛʁmɛ̃ lə ɡajaʁ]) is a commune in the Eure-et-Loir department in northern France.

== Population ==
Historical population
Year	Pop.	±% p.a.
1968	193	—
1975	208	+1.07%
1982	193	−1.06%
1990	212	+1.18%
1999	239	+1.34%
2007	325	+3.92%
2012	320	−0.31%
2017	345	+1.52%
2023	368	+1.08%
Source: INSEE

== See also ==
- Communes of the Eure-et-Loir department
