= List of pantheists =

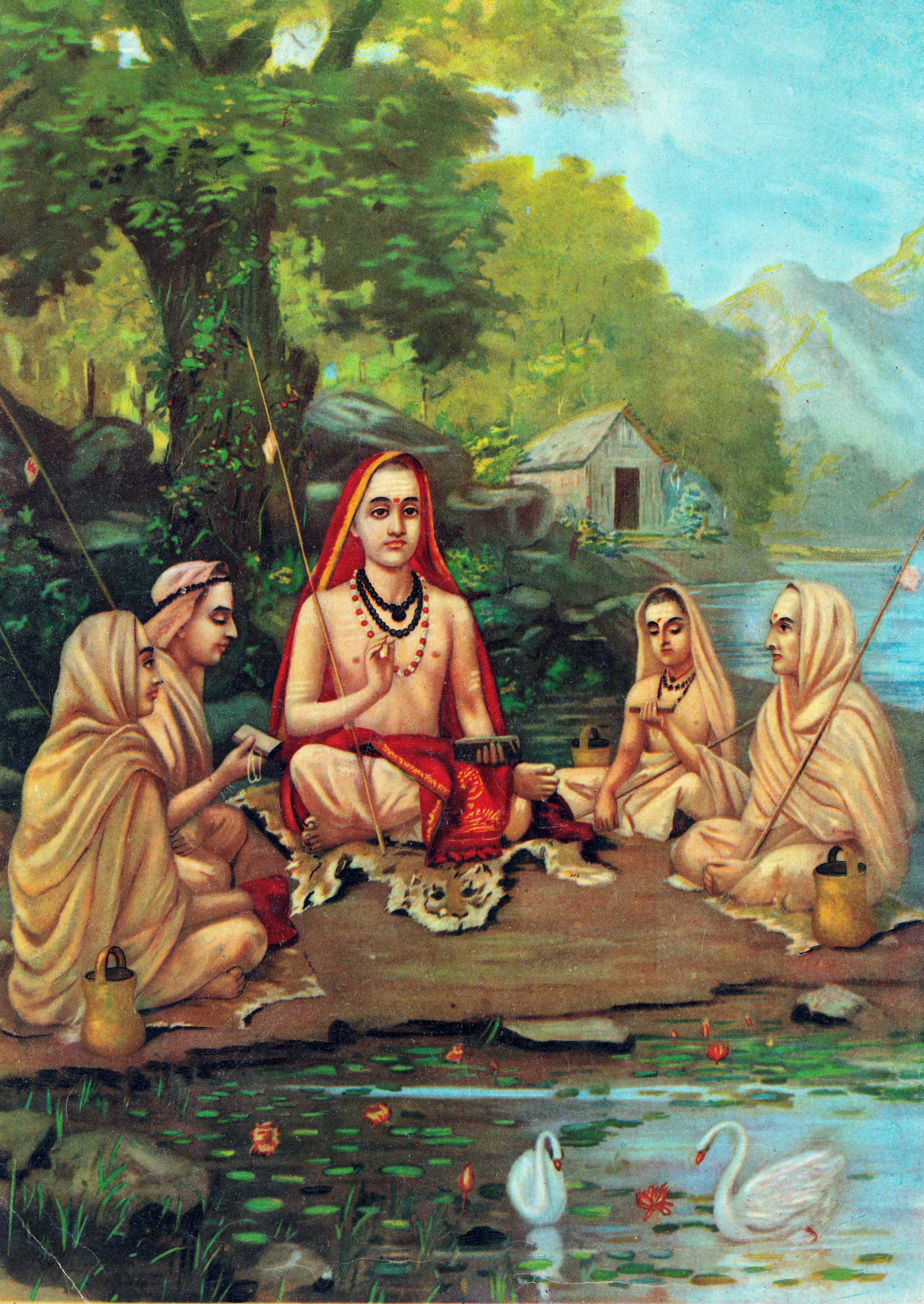
Adi Shankara

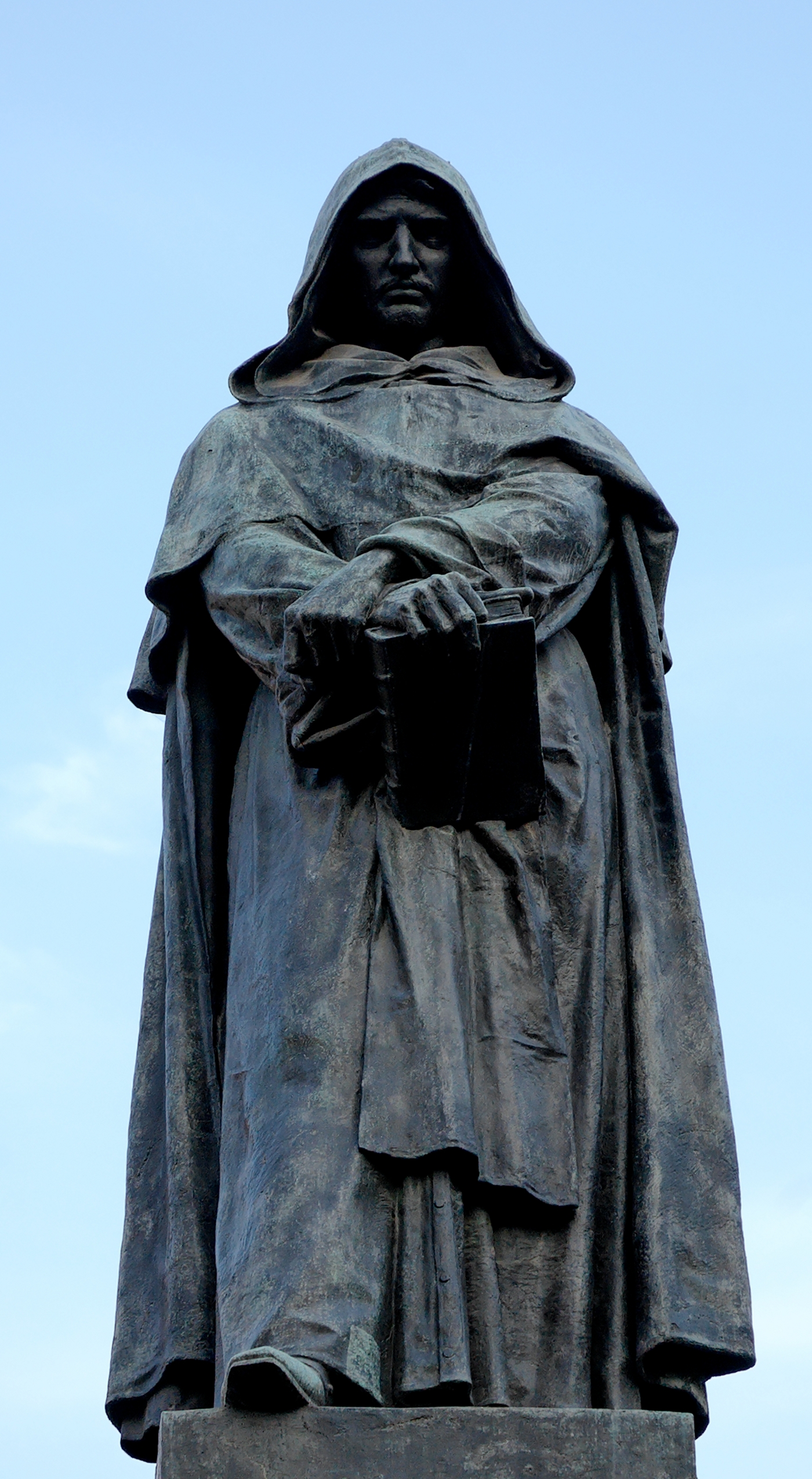
Giordano Bruno

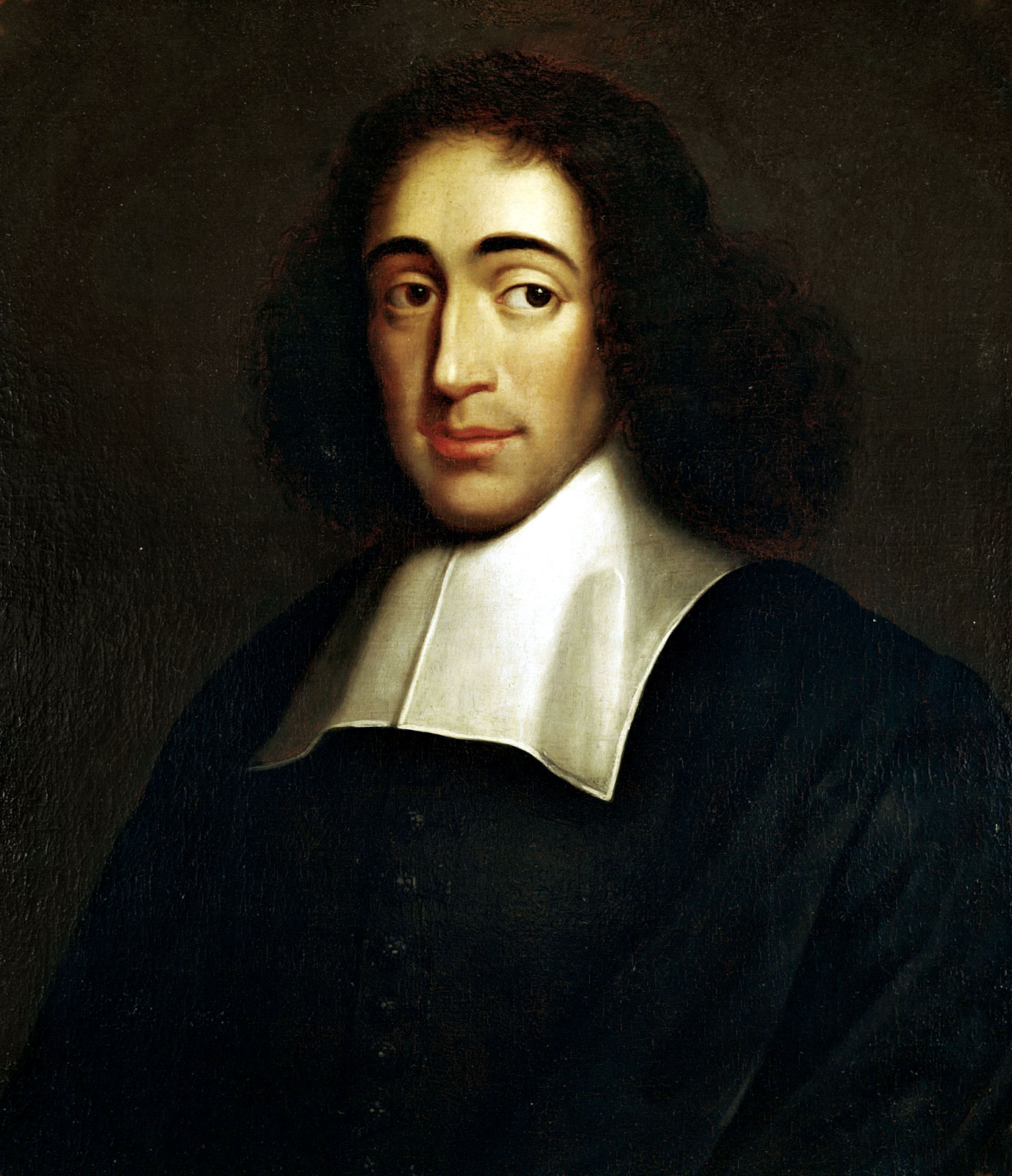
Baruch Spinoza

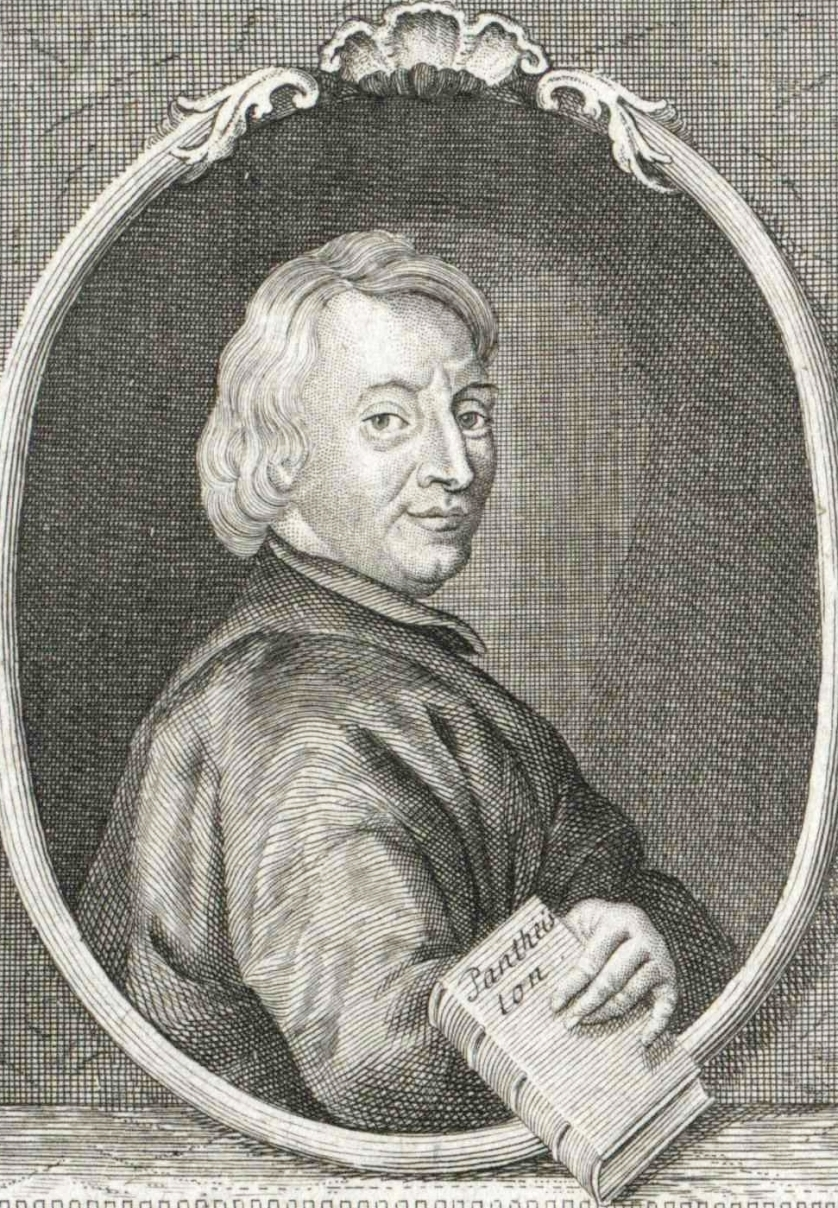
John Toland

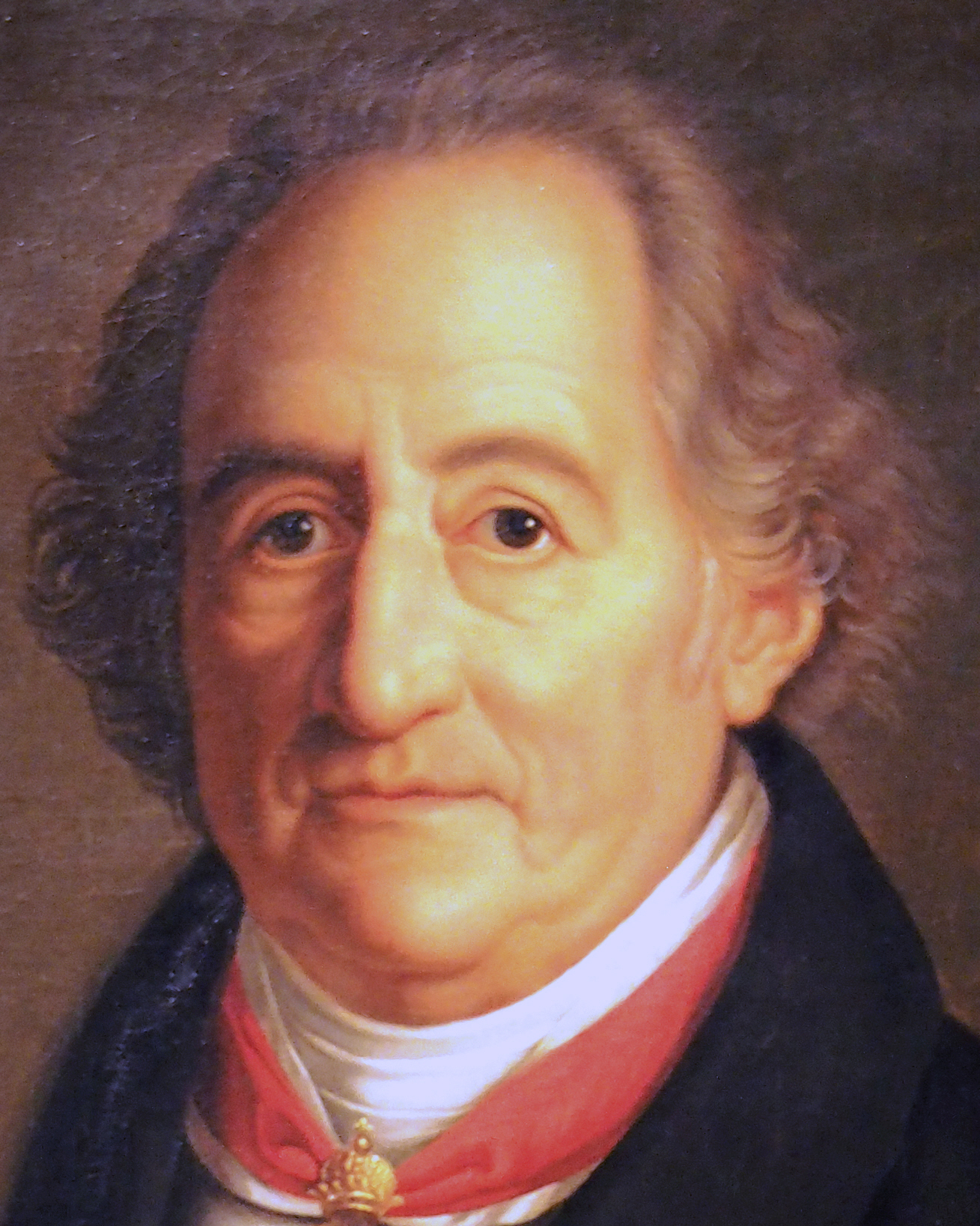
Johann Wolfgang von Goethe

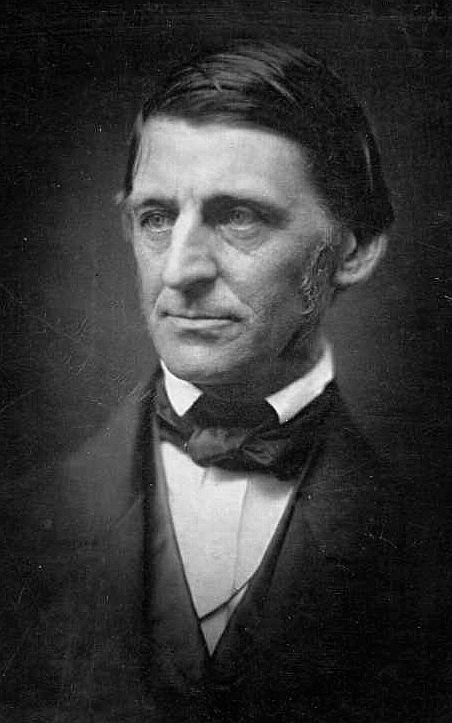
Ralph Waldo Emerson

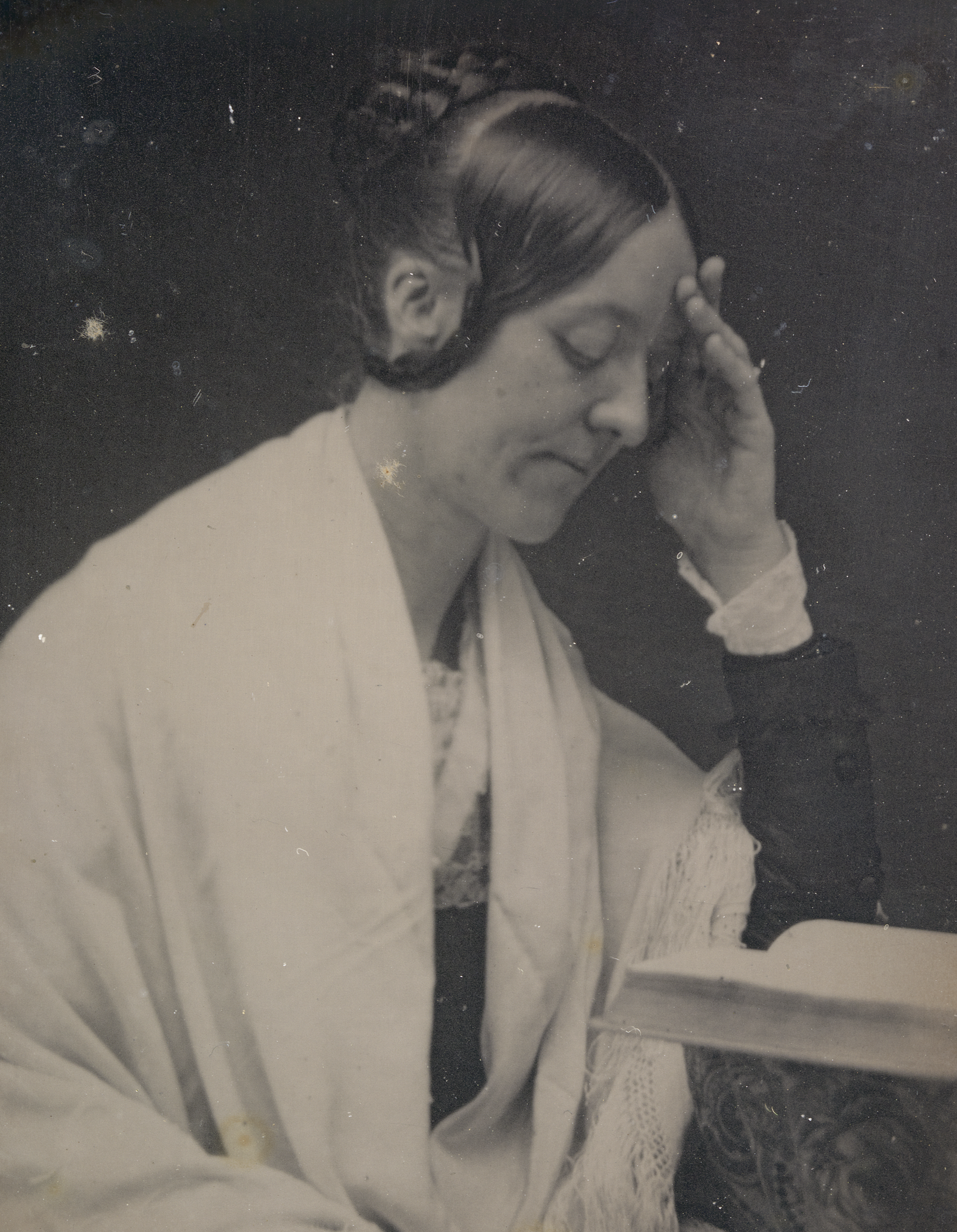
Margaret Fuller

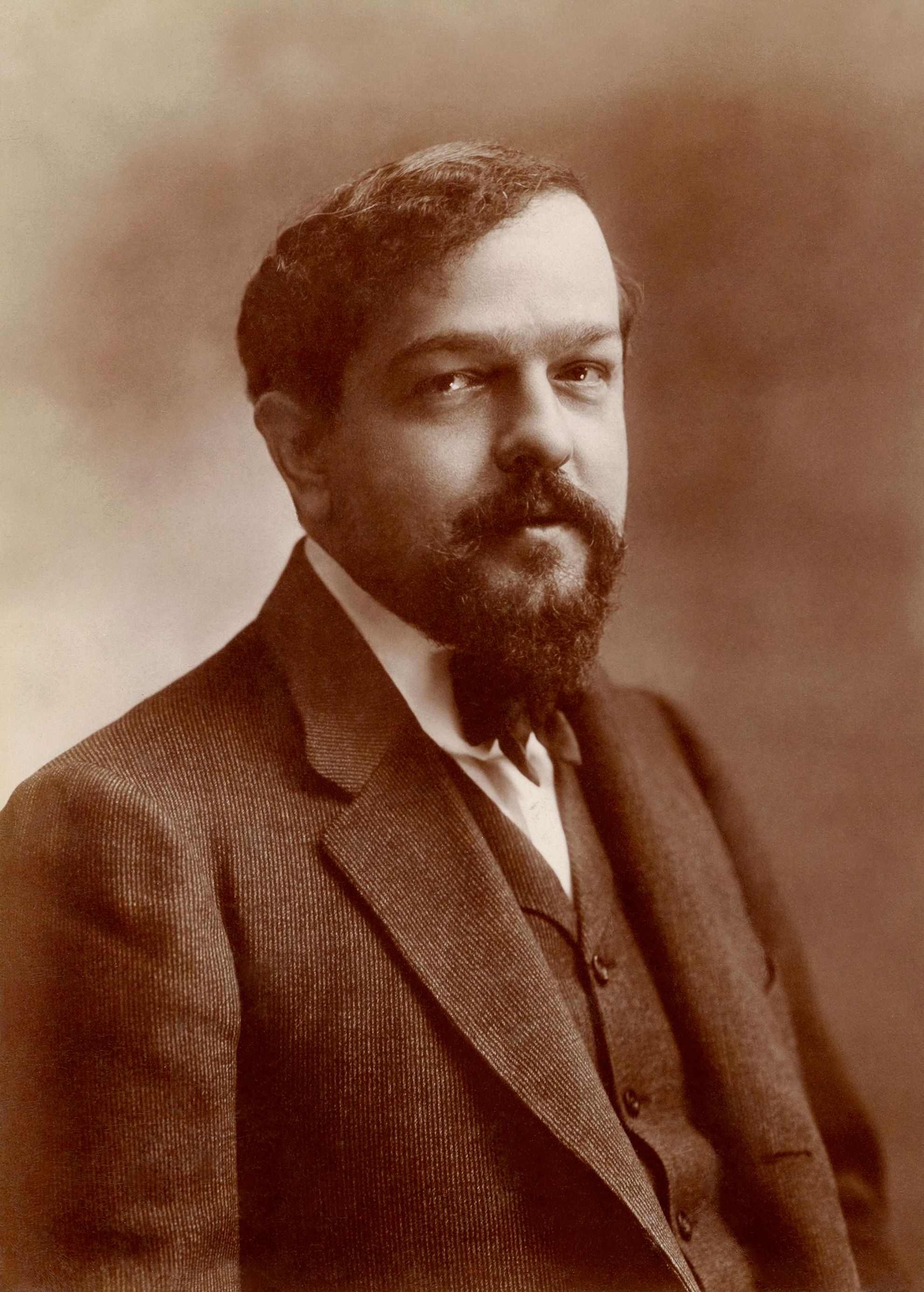
Claude Debussy

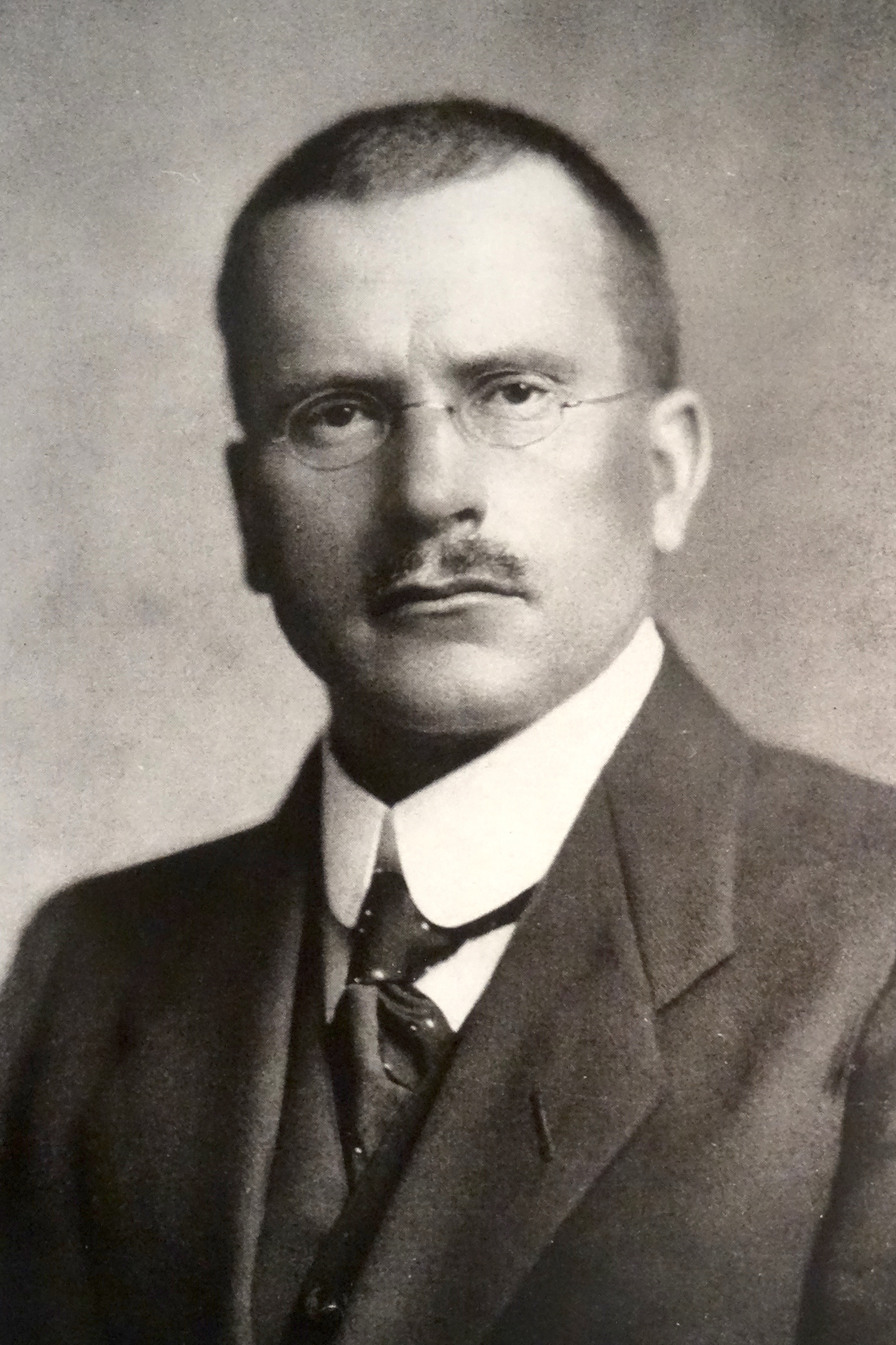
Carl Gustav Jung

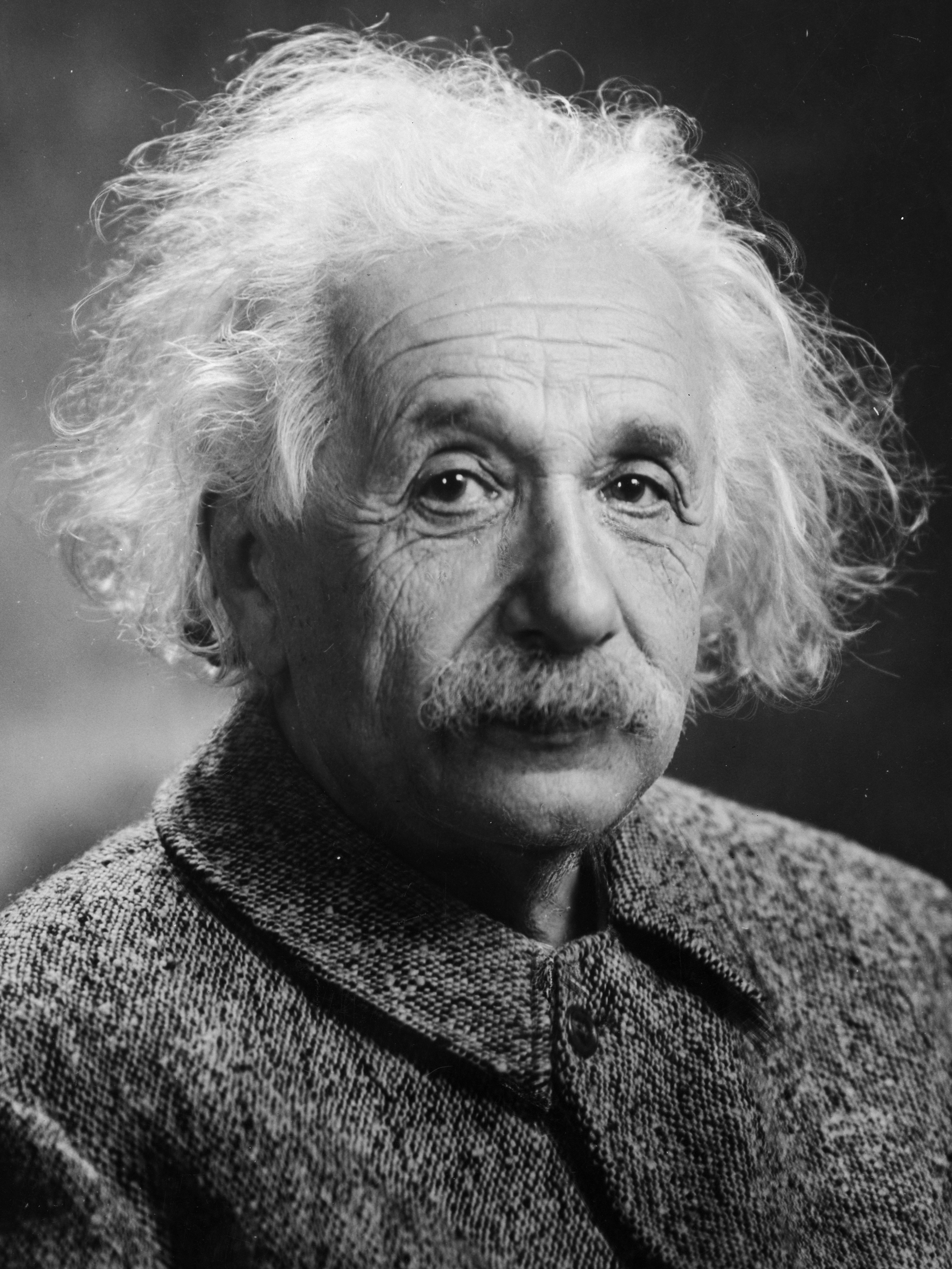
Albert Einstein

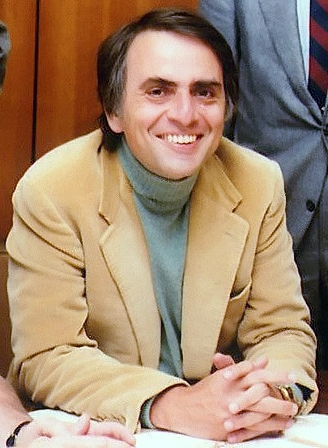
Carl Sagan

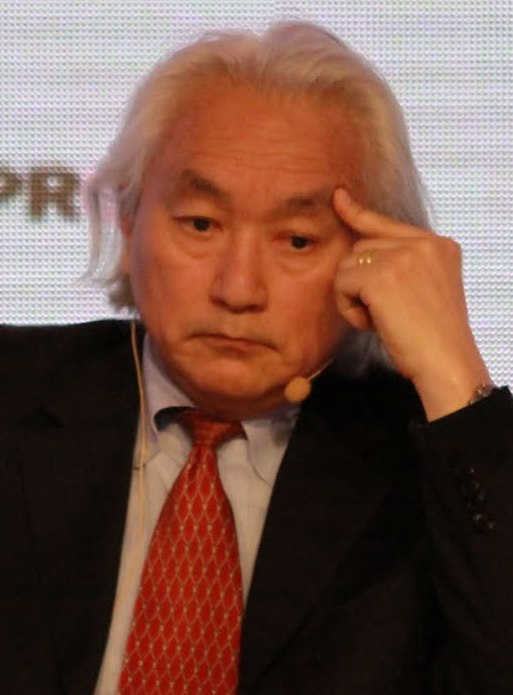
Michio Kaku

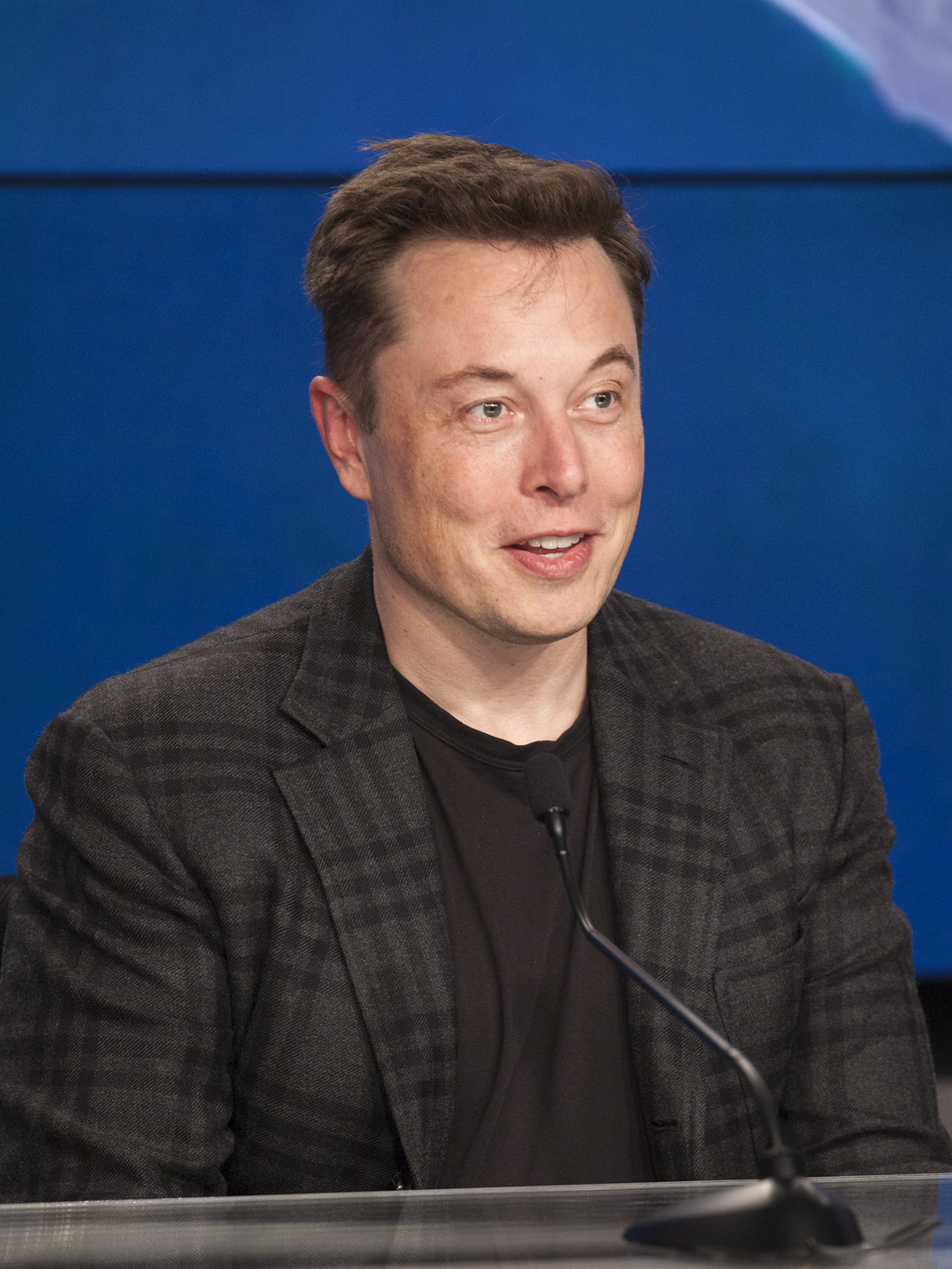
Elon Musk

Pantheism is the belief that the universe (or nature as the totality of everything) is identical with divinity, or that everything composes an all-encompassing, immanent God. Pantheists do not believe in a distinct personal or anthropomorphic god, and the belief is seen as a non-theistic conception of deity.

== List ==
- Nammalvar, one of the twelve Alvars.
- Vyasa, writer of Mahabharata.
- Laozi, name traditionally given to the writer of the Tao Te Ching, and considered the founder of philosophical Taoism.
- Heraclitus (c. 535 BCE – c. 475 BCE), pre-Socratic Greek philosopher, a native of the Greek city Ephesus, Ionia, on the coast of Asia Minor. He was of distinguished parentage. Little is known about his early life and education, but he regarded himself as self-taught and a pioneer of wisdom. From the lonely life he led, and still more from the riddling nature of his philosophy and his contempt for humankind in general, he was called "The Obscure" and the "Weeping Philosopher".
- The Stoics (founded early 3rd century BCE) are often considered pantheists for their belief that it is virtuous to maintain a will (called prohairesis) that is in accord with nature and for arguing that physical conceptions are adequate to explain the entire cosmos.
- Adi Shankara (788–820 CE), known for consolidating the doctrine of Advaita Vedānta.
- Johannes Scotus Eriugena (c. 815 – c. 877), Irish theologian, Neoplatonist philosopher, and poet.
- Ibn Arabi (1165–November 1240), scholar and mystic who is discussed as having panentheist and pantheistic leanings.
- Amalric of Bena (died c. 1204–1207), French theologian, father of medieval pantheism, after whom the Amalricians are named.
- Rumi (1207–1273), Sufi mystic who had a worldview that bridged the gap between theism and pantheism.
- Giordano Bruno (1548–1600), Italian Dominican friar, philosopher, mathematician and astronomer. He was burned at the stake for his pantheist views.
- Jakob Böhme (1575–1624), German philosopher, Christian mystic, and Lutheran Protestant theologian.
- Baruch Spinoza (1632–1677), Jewish-Dutch philosopher, has been called the "prophet", "prince", and father of Western pantheism. However, while Spinoza did equate "God" with Nature, Spinoza's views have recently been seen as being under a form of atheism, and characterization of him as a pantheist or even panentheist should be contextual as he was not a theist in any sense, rejecting any literal belief of "divine" attributions. In his view, all is governed by eternal physical laws and mathematical necessity, with no intentionality or freewill.
- John Toland (1670–1722), an Irish rationalist philosopher and freethinker, and occasional satirist, who wrote numerous books including the Pantheisticon.
- Gotthold Ephraim Lessing (1729–1781), German writer, philosopher, dramatist, publicist and art critic. His alleged confession of Spinozism led to what is known as the pantheism controversy of the 1780s.

=== Late modern period ===
- Johann Wolfgang von Goethe (1749–1832), German writer, artist, and politician. His body of work includes epic and lyric poetry written in a variety of metres and styles; prose and verse dramas; memoirs; an autobiography; literary and aesthetic criticism; treatises on botany, anatomy, and colour; and four novels. In addition, numerous literary and scientific fragments, and over 10,000 letters written by him are extant, as are nearly 3,000 drawings.
- Georg Wilhelm Friedrich Hegel (1770–1831), German philosopher, one of the creators of German Idealism.
- Ludwig van Beethoven (1770–1827), German composer and pianist. A crucial figure in the transition between the Classical and Romantic eras in Western art music, he remains one of the most famous and influential of all composers. His best-known compositions include 9 symphonies, 5 concertos for piano, 32 piano sonatas, and 16 string quartets. He also composed other chamber music, choral works (including the celebrated Missa Solemnis), and songs. He has been labeled a deist as well.
- Caspar David Friedrich (1774–1840), German Romantic landscape painter.
- Friedrich Wilhelm Joseph Schelling (1775–1854), German philosopher.
- Hans Christian Ørsted (1777–1851), Danish physicist and chemist who discovered that electric currents create magnetic fields.
- Ralph Waldo Emerson (1803–1882), American essayist, lecturer, and poet, who led the transcendentalist movement of the mid-19th century.
- Alfred, Lord Tennyson (1809–1892), English poet. Tennyson praised Bruno and Spinoza on his deathbed, saying of Bruno, "His view of God is in some ways mine".
- Margaret Fuller (1810–1850), American journalist, editor, critic, translator, and women's rights advocate associated with the American transcendentalist movement.
- Otto von Bismarck (1815–1898), German statesman and diplomat, first Chancellor of the German Empire.
- Elizabeth Cady Stanton (1815–1902), a women's rights activist and suffragette, criticized anthropomorphic and patriarchal conceptions of divinity, favouring a nature based and universal understanding of God.
- Henry David Thoreau (1817–1862), American author, poet, philosopher, freemason, abolitionist, naturalist, tax resister, development critic, surveyor, historian, and leading transcendentalist.
- Walt Whitman (1819–1892), American poet, essayist and journalist.
- John Shertzer Hittell (1825–1901), American historian.
- Leo Tolstoy (1828–1910), Russian writer, philosophical essayist and pacifist.
- Helena Blavatsky (1831–1891), Russian esotericist and mystic.
- Robert G. Ingersoll (1833–1899), lawyer, Civil War veteran, political leader, orator, and notable agnostic.
- Ernst Haeckel (1834–1919), German zoologist, natural historian, and philosopher.
- Friedrich Nietzsche (1844–1900), German philosopher. While sometimes interpreted as a proponent of atheistic existentialism by his statements about God, the German philosopher Martin Heidegger says about Nietzsche's conception of divine: "Is Nietzsche here teaching a pan-theism", asks Heidegger. "If it were pantheism, we would first of all still have to ask what pan—the universe, the whole—and what theos—God—here mean. At all events, here we have a question! So, then, God is not dead? Yes and no! Yes, he is dead. But which God? The God of "morality," the Christian God is dead—the "Father" in whom we seek sanctuary, the "Personality" with whom we negotiate and bare our hearts, the "Judge" with whom we adjudicate, the "Paymaster" from whom we receive our virtues' reward, that God with whom we do business. Yet where is the mother who will take pay for loving her child? The God who is viewed in terms of morality, this God alone is meant when Nietzsche says "God is dead." He died because human beings murdered him. They murdered him when they reckoned his divine grandeur in terms of their petty needs for recompense, when they cut him down to their own size. That God fell from power because he was a "blunder" of human beings who negate themselves and negate life (Nietzsche by Martin Heidegger, VIII, 62). Von Douglas Burham notes, in light of Nietzsche, that "God exists entirely immanently to nature or the cosmos" and that Nietzsche opposed popular forms of atheism as mired by morality: "That is, a "religion of pity" captures the way in which an atheist, for example, surreptitiously retains a direct connection to Christianity through the continuing commitment to morality.". Nietzsche in the posthumously-published "The Will to Power" translated by Walter Kaufmann (philosopher) states

The European form of Buddhism: the energy of knowledge and strength compels this belief...So one understands that an antithesis to pantheism is attempted here: for "everything perfect, divine, eternal" also compels a faith in the "eternal recurrence." Question: does morality make impossible this pantheistic affirmation of all things, too? At bottom, it is only the moral god that has been overcome. Does it make sense to conceive a god "beyond good and evil"? Would a pantheism in this sense be possible?"

- Felix Klein (1849–1925), German mathematician.
- Nikola Tesla (1856–1943), the Serbian American inventor believed in aether (opposite essentially of gravity) being the source of all existence and energy, sometimes referred to as prana or Qi in Chinese.
- Gustav Mahler (1860–1911), Romantic Austrian composer and one of the leading conductors of his generation.
- Claude Debussy (1862–1918), French composer.
- Jean Sibelius (1865–1957), Finnish composer.
- Carl Gustav Jung (1875–1961), Swiss psychiatrist and psychotherapist who founded analytical psychology. Jung proposed and developed the concept of the collective unconscious from a pantheistic worldview.
- Janusz Korczak (1878–1942), Polish-Jewish educator, children's author, and pediatrician.
- Albert Einstein (1879–1955), German theoretical physicist, one of the most prolific intellects in human history, identified with Spinoza's God and called his own views on God "pantheistic". Einstein held a wavering view on pantheism and at times did not endorse it completely, making the statement in 1930, "I do not know if I can define myself as a pantheist. The problem involved is too vast for our limited minds." Instead, Einstein also frequently spoke of a more Cosmic Spirituality, a view where religion and science are partnered. Einstein rejected atheism.
- D. H. Lawrence (1885–1930), English novelist, poet, playwright, essayist, literary critic and painter.
- Erwin Schrödinger (1887–1962), Austrian and Irish theoretical physicist who engaged with Eastern religions and pantheism.
- Robinson Jeffers (1887–1962), American poet, known for his work about the central California coast.
- Isidor Isaac Rabi (1898–1988), Galician-born American physicist and Nobel laureate, recognized in 1944 for his discovery of nuclear magnetic resonance, which is used in magnetic resonance imaging. He was also involved in the development of the cavity magnetron, which is used in microwave radar and microwave ovens.
- Leon Kelly (1901–1982), American painter and draftsman, most well known for his contributions to American Surrealism.
- Ansel Adams (1902–1984), American photographer and environmentalist.
- Paul Dirac (1902–1984), British co-founder of quantum mechanics, used "God" as simply a metaphor for mathematics, including the physical laws and fundamental principles of nature.
- Alan Watts (1915–1973), British philosopher, writer, and speaker.
- Pete Seeger (1919–2014), American folk singer.
- Audrey Hepburn (1929–1993), British actress and humanitarian.
- Carl Sagan (1934–1996), American astronomer, author, and science communicator.
- Jose Mujica (1935–2025), Uruguay president.
- Alan Vega (1938–2016), American vocalist, primarily known for his work with electronic protopunk duo Suicide.
- John A. Leslie (1940–), Canadian philosopher and writer.
- Reinhold Messner (1944–), Italian mountaineer, explorer, and author.
- Paul Harrison (1945–), English journalist, author of several books and reports on environment and development, and the founder and president of the World Pantheist Movement.
- Michio Kaku (1947–), American theoretical physicist and science communicator.
- Chris Goodall (1955–), English businessman and author.
- Mark Rylance (1960–), English actor.
- Jadav Payeng (1963–), Indian environmentalist and forestry worker.
- James Hetfield (1963–), American lead vocalist, rhythm guitarist, co-founder and main songwriter of heavy metal band Metallica.
- That Vegan Teacher (1964–), Canadian animal rights activist.
- Elon Musk (1971–), entrepreneur and business magnate. Musk in 2021 quoted Einstein in reference to a belief in Spinoza's God, while in 2024 he has too identified as a Cultural Christian.
- Gaahl (1975–), Norwegian black metal vocalist and a painter. Gaahl has stated the only true God is within yourself, and that God is within everything, "God is within men, god is within Nature," and has considered himself a Norwegian traditionalist.
- TJ Kirk (1985–) American YouTuber and podcaster, formerly known as “The Amazing Atheist”.
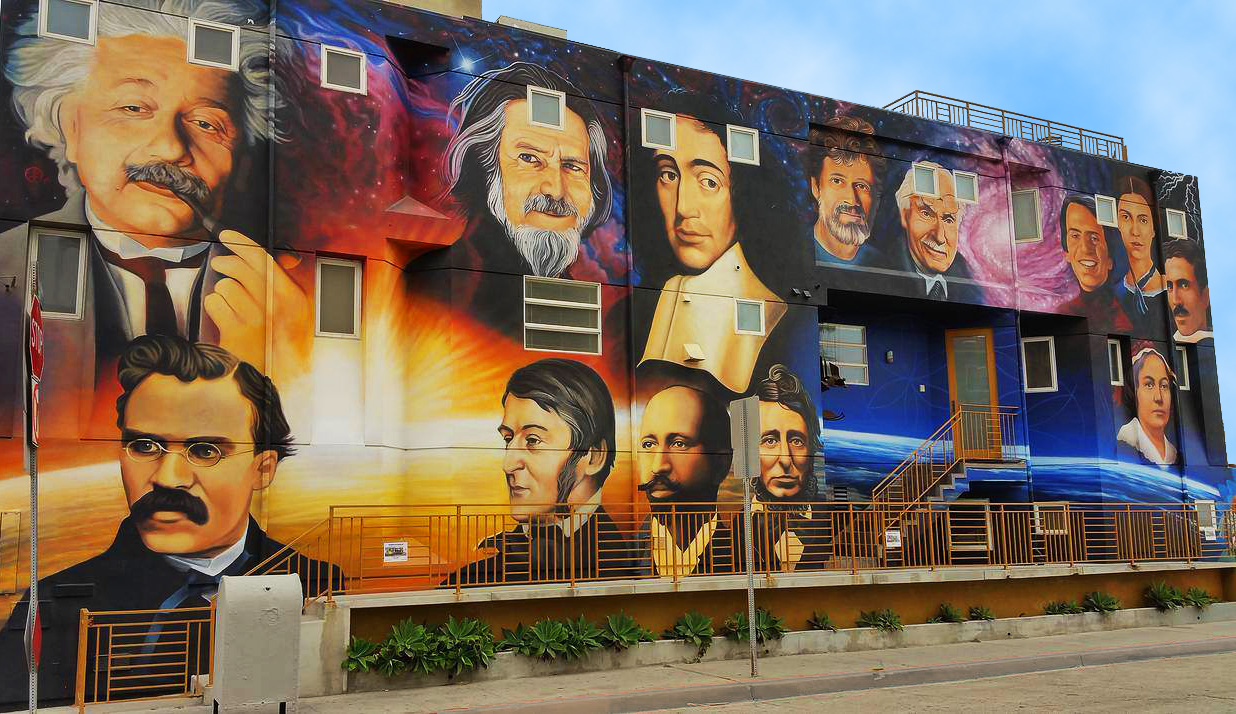
  Luminaries of Pantheism artwork by Levi Ponce, 2015

== Groups ==
=== Africa ===
- Chukwu

=== Asia ===
- Advaita
- Taoism
- Vishistadvaita
- Shaktadvaita
- Trika Shaivism

=== Europe ===
- Peterburgian Vedism
- Adamites, a proto protestant sect

=== Middle East ===
- Bektashi
- Sufis

=== North America ===
- Theosophy
- Religious Science

== See also ==
- Pandeism#Notable thinkers
- Pierre Teilhard de Chardin
- Naturalistic pantheism
- George Berkeley
  - subjective idealism/'immaterialism'
