= Naturalistic pantheism =

Form of pantheism

Naturalistic pantheism, also known as scientific pantheism, is a form of pantheism. The term has been used in various ways, most notably to relate divinity with Nature and the substance of the universe, as pantheism itself is non-theistic. In scientific pantheism, the divine—or in Western monotheistic language, "God"—is associated with the whole of Nature. The phrase has often been associated with the philosophy of Baruch Spinoza. In philosophy, the term frequently denotes the view that everything is part of Nature and can be studied with the methods appropriate for its study (i.e., the sciences). Pantheist belief does not recognize a distinct personal god, anthropomorphic or otherwise, but instead characterizes a broad range of doctrines differing in forms of relationships between reality and divinity.

== Component definitions ==
The term "pantheism" is derived from the Greek words pan (Greek: πᾶν), meaning "all," and theos (Greek: θεός), meaning "divine, deity, God") It was coined by Joseph Raphson in his work De spatio reali, published in 1697. The term was introduced to English by Irish writer John Toland in his 1705 work Socinianism Truly Stated, By A Pantheist, which described pantheism as the "opinion of those who believe in no other eternal being but the universe". The term "naturalistic" derives from the word "naturalism", which has several meanings in philosophy and aesthetics.

== Early conceptions ==
Joseph Needham, a modern British scholar of Chinese philosophy and science, identified Taoism and the technology of the Wuxing as "a naturalistic pantheism which emphasizes the unity and spontaneity of the operations of Nature". This philosophy can be dated to the late 4th century BCE. The Hellenistic Greek philosophical school of Stoicism (which started in the early 3rd century BCE) rejected the dualist idea of the separate ideal/conscious and material realms, and identified the substance of God with the entire cosmos and heaven. However, not all philosophers who did so can be classified as naturalistic pantheists.

== Modern conceptions ==
Naturalistic pantheism was expressed by various thinkers, including Giordano Bruno, who was burned at the stake for his views. The 17th-century Jewish Dutch philosopher Baruch Spinoza became particularly known for it, receiving a herem for his work. In 1705, the Irish writer John Toland endorsed a form of pantheism in which the "God-soul" is identical with the material universe. German naturalist Ernst Haeckel (1834–1919) proposed a monistic pantheism in which the idea of God is identical with that of nature or substance. The World Pantheist Movement, started in 1999, describes naturalistic pantheism as including reverence for the universe, realism, strong naturalism, and respect for reason and the scientific method as methods of understanding the world. Paul Harrison considers its position the closest modern equivalent to Toland's.

== See also ==
- Anima mundi
- Animism
- Classical pantheism
- Deism
- Gaia hypothesis
- Metaphysical naturalism
- Naturalism (philosophy)
- Philosophical realism
- Religious naturalism
