= Pantheism =

Belief that God and reality are identical

Pantheism is a diverse family of philosophical and religious beliefs that equate reality with divinity. Pantheistic concepts date back thousands of years, and pantheistic elements have been identified in diverse religious traditions. Most notably, pantheism refers to the belief that the totality of being—called by various names such as Nature, the universe, the cosmos—is a self-organizing unity that needs no distinct, supernatural creator, and that pantheists can address it with the same sense of reverence and dulia as theists attribute to their gods.

Pantheism is not to be confused with panentheism, which maintains divinity as an entity greater than the universe out of which the universe arises, while pantheism is more explicitly non-theistic in framework.

Pantheist belief does not recognize a distinct personal god, anthropomorphic or otherwise, but instead characterizes a broad range of doctrines differing in forms of relationships between reality and divinity. One of the earliest uses of the term pantheism dates back to mathematician Joseph Raphson in 1697.

Pantheism was popularized in Western culture based on the work of the 17th-century philosopher Baruch Spinoza—in particular, his book Ethics. A pantheistic stance was also taken prior in the 16th century by philosopher and cosmologist Giordano Bruno, who was burned at the stake for his pantheist views by the inquisition of the Catholic Church.

In the East, Advaita Vedanta, a school of Hindu philosophy is thought to be similar to pantheism in Western philosophy. The early Taoism of Laozi and Zhuangzi is also sometimes considered pantheistic, although it could be more similar to panentheism. Cheondoism, which arose in the Joseon Dynasty of Korea, and Won Buddhism are also considered pantheistic.

== Etymology ==
Pantheism derives from the Greek πᾶν (pan, lit. 'all' or 'of everything') and θεός (theos, lit. 'deity' or 'divinity' or 'god'). The first known combination of these roots appears in Latin, in Joseph Raphson's 1697 book De Spatio Reali seu Ente Infinito (lit. 'On Real Space, or the Infinite Being'), in which he refers to pantheismus. It was subsequently translated into English as "pantheism" in 1702.

== Definitions ==
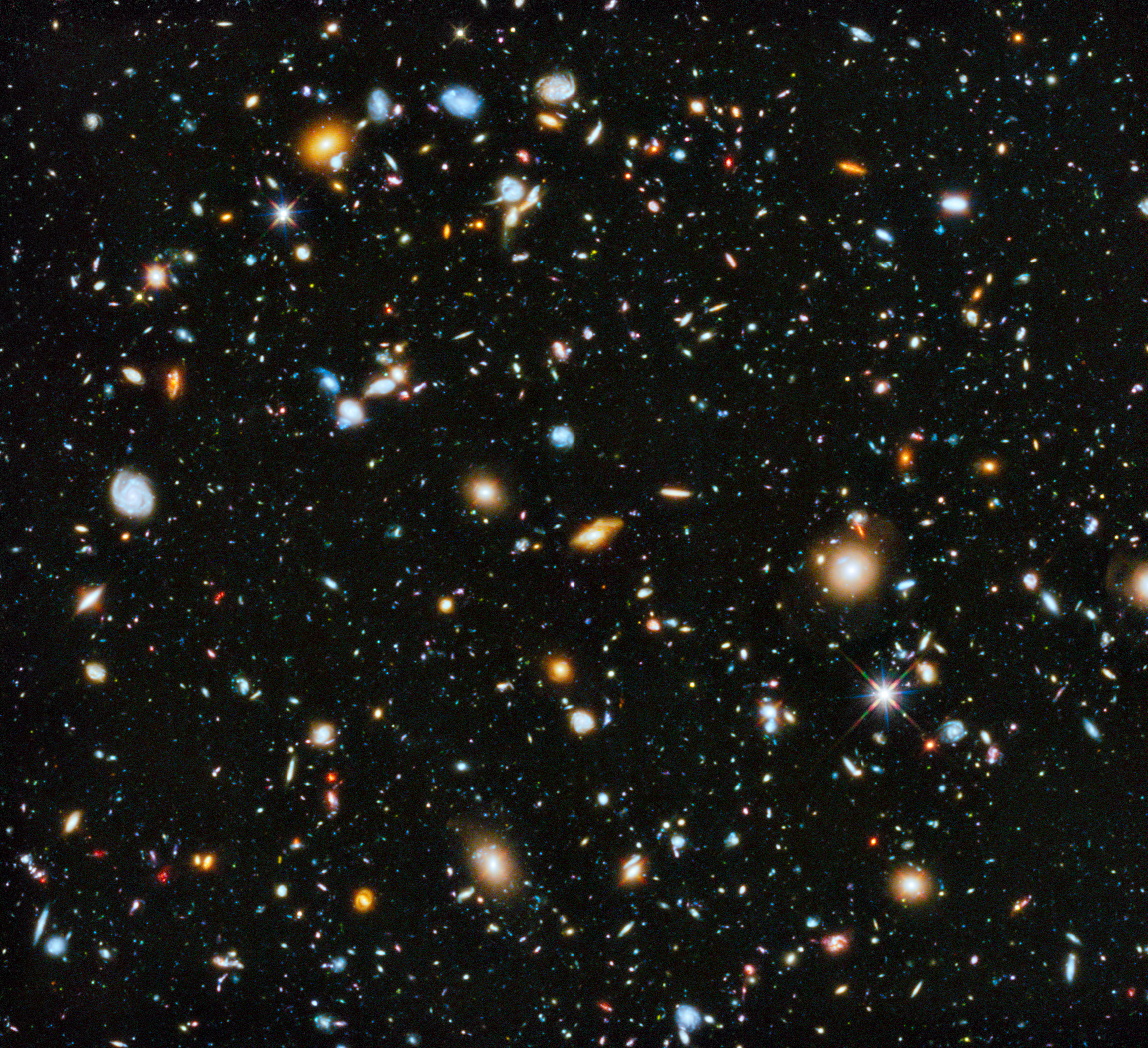
Pantheists believe that the universe itself and everything in it form a single, all-encompassing deity.

There are numerous definitions of pantheism, including:

- a theological and philosophical position which identifies God with the universe, or regards the universe as a manifestation of God;
- the belief that everything is part of an all-encompassing, immanent God and that all forms of reality may then be considered either mode of that Being, or identical with it; and
- a non-religious philosophical position maintaining that the Universe (in the sense of the totality of all existence) and God are identical.

== History ==
=== Pre-modern times ===
Pantheism "is primarily a polemical term", so there are not many pantheists in Ancient history.

Early traces of pantheist thought can be found within animistic beliefs and tribal religions throughout the world as an expression of unity with the divine, specifically in beliefs that have no central polytheist or monotheist personas. Hellenistic theology makes early recorded reference to pantheism within the ancient Greek religion of Orphism, where pan (the all) is made cognate with the creator God Phanes (symbolizing the universe), and with Zeus, after the swallowing of Phanes.

Pantheistic tendencies existed in a number of Gnostic groups, with pantheistic thought appearing throughout the Middle Ages. These included the beliefs of mystics such as: Ortlieb of Strasbourg, David of Dinant, Amalric of Bena and Eckhart.

The Bible affirms pantheism (Acts 17:28, Jeremiah 23:24). According to others, Acts 17:28 is not pantheist, but panentheist. According to Jacqueline Lagrée, Acts 17:28 could be pantheistic, but panentheism is more accurate for what has been called pantheism. The Catholic Church has long regarded pantheistic ideas as heresy. Sebastian Franck was considered an early Pantheist. Giordano Bruno, an Italian friar who evangelized about a transcendent and infinite God, was burned at the stake in 1600 by the Roman Inquisition. He has since become known as a celebrated pantheist and martyr of science.

The Hindu philosophy of Advaita Vedanta is thought to be similar to pantheism. The term Advaita (literally "non-secondness", but usually rendered as "nondualism", and often equated with monism (Note: Form of monism: Malkovsky 2000, p. 71: "The interpretation of advaita that is the most common equates non-duality with monism and acosmic illusionism. Only the Absolute, or the paraa brahma, is said to exist; everything else is but an illusory appearance."; Menon 2012: "The essential philosophy of Advaita is an idealist monism, and is considered to be presented first in the Upaniṣads and consolidated in the Brahma Sūtra by this tradition."; King 1995, p. 65: "The prevailing monism of the Upanishads was developed by the Advaita Vedanta to its ultimate extreme."; Mohanty 1980, p. 205: "Nyaya-Vaiseshika is realistic; Advaita Vedanta is idealistic. The former is pluralistic, the latter monistic.")) refers to the idea that Brahman alone is ultimately real, while the transient phenomenal world is an illusory appearance (maya) of Brahman. In this view, jivatman, the experiencing self, is ultimately non-different ("na aparah") from Ātman-Brahman, the highest Self or Reality. (Note: Highest self: Shankara, Upadesasahasri I.18.3: "I am ever-free, the existent" (Sat). I.18.6: "The two [contradictory] notions "I am the Existent-Brahman" and "I act," have Atman as their witness. It is considered more reasonable to give up only [that one] of the two [notions] which arises from ignorance. I.18.7: "The notion, "I am the Existent," arises from right means of knowledge [while] the other notion has its origin in fallacious means of knowledge." (Mayeda 1992, p. 172); Brahmajnanavalimala Verse 20: "Brahman is real, the universe is mithya (it cannot be categorized as either real or unreal). The jiva is Brahman itself and not different." Translation by S. N. Sastri; Sivananda 1993, p. 219: "Brahman (the Absolute) is alone real; this world is unreal; and the Jiva or individual soul is non-different from Brahman."; Menon 2012: "The experiencing self (jīva) and the transcendental self of the Universe (ātman) are in reality identical (both are Brahman), though the individual self seems different as space within a container seems different from space as such. These cardinal doctrines are represented in the anonymous verse "brahma satyam jagan mithya; jīvo brahmaiva na aparah" (Brahman is alone True, and this world of plurality is an error; the individual self is not different from Brahman)."; Deutsch 1973, p. 54: "[the] essential status [of the individual human person] is that of unqualified reality, of identity with the Absolute [...] the self (jiva) is only misperceived: the self is really Brahman."; Koller 2013, pp. 100–101: "Atman, which is identical to Brahman, is ultimately the only reality and [...] the appearance of plurality is entirely the work of ignorance [...] the self is ultimately of the nature of Atman/Brahman [...] Brahman alone is ultimately real."; Bowker 2000a, "Advaita Vedanta": "There is only Brahman, which is necessarily undifferentiated. It follows that there cannot even be a difference, or duality, between the human subject, or self, and Brahman, for Brahman must be that very self (since Brahman is the reality underlying all appearance). The goal of human life and wisdom must, therefore, be the realization that the self (ātman) is Brahman."; Hacker (1995, p. 88) notes that Shankara uses two groups of words to denote 'atman': "One group - principally jiva, vijnanatman, and sarira - expresses the illusory aspect of the soul [...] But in addition there are the two expressions atman and pratyagatman. These also designate the individual soul, but in its real aspect." Mayeda (1992, pp. 11, 14) uses the word pratyagatman; Sivananda1993, p. 219), Deutsch (1973, p. 54), and Menon (2012) use the term jiva when referring to the identity of atman and Brahman.) The jivatman or individual self is a mere reflection or limitation of singular Ātman in a multitude of apparent individual bodies.

=== Baruch Spinoza ===
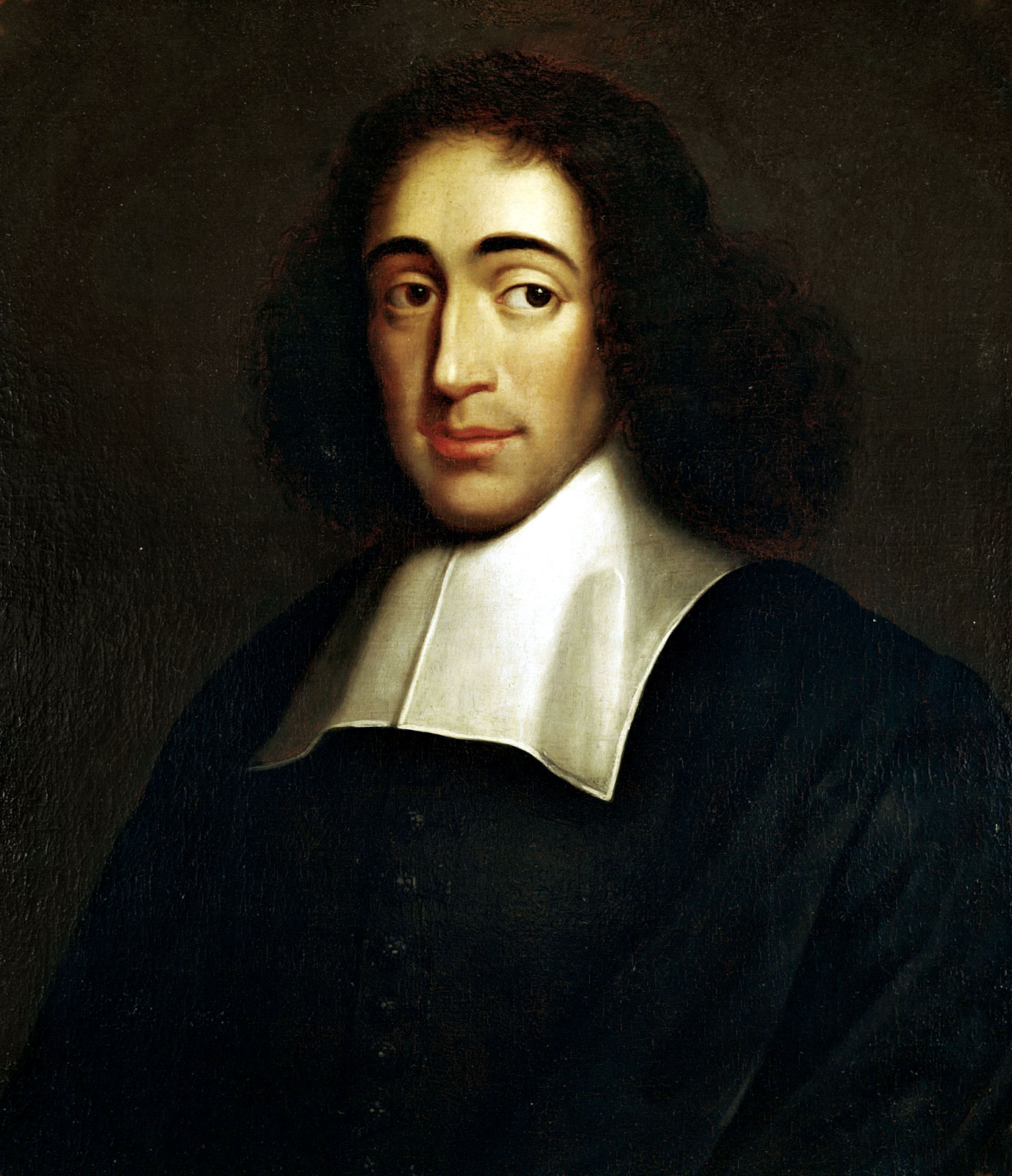
The philosophy of Baruch Spinoza is often regarded as pantheism.

In the West, pantheism was formalized as a separate theology and philosophy based on the work of the 17th-century philosopher Baruch Spinoza. Spinoza was a Dutch philosopher of Portuguese descent raised in the Sephardi Jewish community in Amsterdam. He developed highly controversial ideas regarding the authenticity of the Hebrew Bible and the nature of the Divine, and was effectively excluded from Jewish society at age 23, when the local synagogue issued a herem against him. A number of his books were published posthumously, and shortly thereafter included in the Catholic Church's Index of Forbidden Books.

In the posthumously published Ethics, he opposed René Descartes' famous mind–body dualism, the theory that the body and spirit are separate. Spinoza held the monist view that the two are the same, and monism is a fundamental part of his philosophy. He was described as a "God-intoxicated man" and used the word "God" to describe the unity of all substances. This view influenced philosophers such as Georg Wilhelm Friedrich Hegel, who said, "You are either a Spinozist or not a philosopher at all." Spinoza earned praise as one of the great rationalists of 17th-century philosophy and one of Western philosophy's most important thinkers. Although the term "pantheism" was not coined until after his death, he is regarded as the most celebrated advocate of the concept. His book, Ethics, was the major source from which Western pantheism spread.

=== 18th century ===
The first known use of the term pantheism was in Latin (pantheismus) by the English mathematician Joseph Raphson in his work De Spatio Reali seu Ente Infinito, published in 1697. Raphson begins with a distinction between atheistic "panhylists" (from the Greek roots pan, 'all', and hyle, 'matter'), who believe everything is matter, and Spinozan "pantheists" who believe in "a certain universal substance, material as well as intelligence, that fashions all things that exist out of its own essence." Raphson thought that the universe was immeasurable in respect to a human's capacity of understanding, and believed that humans would never be able to comprehend it. He referred to the pantheism of the Ancient Egyptians, Persians, Syrians, Assyrians, Greek, Indians, and Jewish Kabbalists, specifically referring to Spinoza.

The term was first used in English in a translation of Raphson's work in 1702. It was later used and popularized by Irish writer John Toland in his work of 1705 Socinianism Truly Stated, by a Pantheist. Toland was influenced by both Spinoza and Bruno and had read Joseph Raphson's De Spatio Reali, referring to it as "the ingenious Mr. Ralphson's (sic) Book of Real Space". Like Raphson, he used the terms "pantheist" and "Spinozist" interchangeably. In 1720 he wrote the Pantheisticon: or The Form of Celebrating the Socratic-Society in Latin, envisioning a pantheist society that believed, "All things in the world are one, and one is all in all things ... what is all in all things is God, eternal and immense, neither born nor ever to perish." He clarified his idea of pantheism in a letter to Gottfried Leibniz in 1710 when he referred to "the pantheistic opinion of those who believe in no other eternal being but the universe".

In the mid-eighteenth century, the English theologian Daniel Waterland defined pantheism this way: "It supposes God and nature, or God and the whole universe, to be one and the same substance—one universal being; insomuch that men's souls are only modifications of the divine substance." In the early nineteenth century, the German theologian Julius Wegscheider defined pantheism as the belief that God and the world established by God are one and the same.

Between 1785–89, a controversy about Spinoza's philosophy arose between the German philosophers Friedrich Heinrich Jacobi (a critic) and Moses Mendelssohn (a defender). Known in German as the Pantheismusstreit (pantheism controversy), it helped spread pantheism to many German thinkers.

=== 19th century ===
==== Growing influence ====
During the beginning of the 19th century, pantheism was the viewpoint of many leading writers and philosophers, attracting figures such as: William Wordsworth and Samuel Coleridge in Great Britain; Johann Gottlieb Fichte, Schelling and Hegel in Germany; Knut Hamsun in Norway; and Walt Whitman, Ralph Waldo Emerson and Henry David Thoreau in the United States. Seen as a growing threat by the Vatican, in 1864, it was formally condemned by Pope Pius IX in the Syllabus of Errors.

A letter written in 1886 by William Herndon, Abraham Lincoln's law partner, was sold at auction for US$30,000 in 2011. In it, Herndon writes of the U.S. President's evolving religious views, which included pantheism.

"Mr. Lincoln's religion is too well known to me to allow of even a shadow of a doubt; he is or was a Theist and a Rationalist, denying all extraordinary – supernatural inspiration or revelation. At one time in his life, to say the least, he was an elevated Pantheist, doubting the immortality of the soul as the Christian world understands that term. He believed that the soul lost its identity and was immortal as a force. Subsequent to this he rose to the belief of a God, and this is all the change he ever underwent."

The subject is understandably controversial, but the letter's content is consistent with Lincoln's fairly lukewarm approach to organized religion.

==== Comparison with non-Christian religions ====
Some 19th-century theologians thought that various pre-Christian religions and philosophies were pantheistic. They thought Pantheism was similar to the ancient Hinduism philosophy of Advaita (non-dualism).

19th-century European theologians also considered Ancient Egyptian religion to contain pantheistic elements and pointed to Egyptian philosophy as a source of Greek Pantheism. The latter included some of the Presocratics, such as Heraclitus and Anaximander. The Stoics were pantheists, beginning with Zeno of Citium and culminating in the emperor-philosopher Marcus Aurelius. During the pre-Christian Roman Empire, Stoicism was one of the three dominant schools of philosophy, along with Epicureanism and Neoplatonism. The early Taoism of Laozi and Zhuangzi is also sometimes considered pantheistic, although it could be more similar to panentheism.

Cheondoism, which arose in the Joseon Dynasty of Korea, and Won Buddhism are also considered pantheistic. The Realist Society of Canada believes that the consciousness of the self-aware universe is reality, which is an alternative view of Pantheism.

=== 20th century ===
In the late 20th century, some declared that pantheism was an underlying theology of Neopaganism, and pantheists began forming organizations devoted specifically to pantheism and treating it as a separate religion.

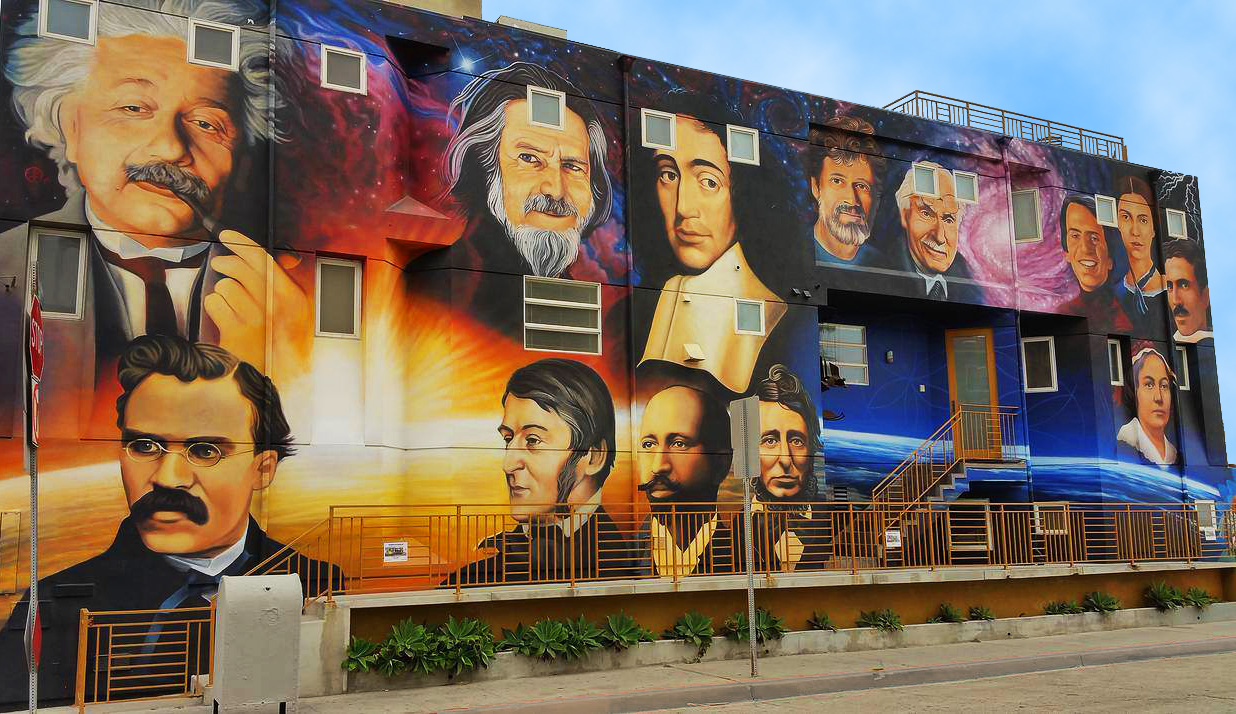
Levi Ponce's Luminaries of Pantheism mural in Venice, California, for The Paradise Project

=== 21st century ===
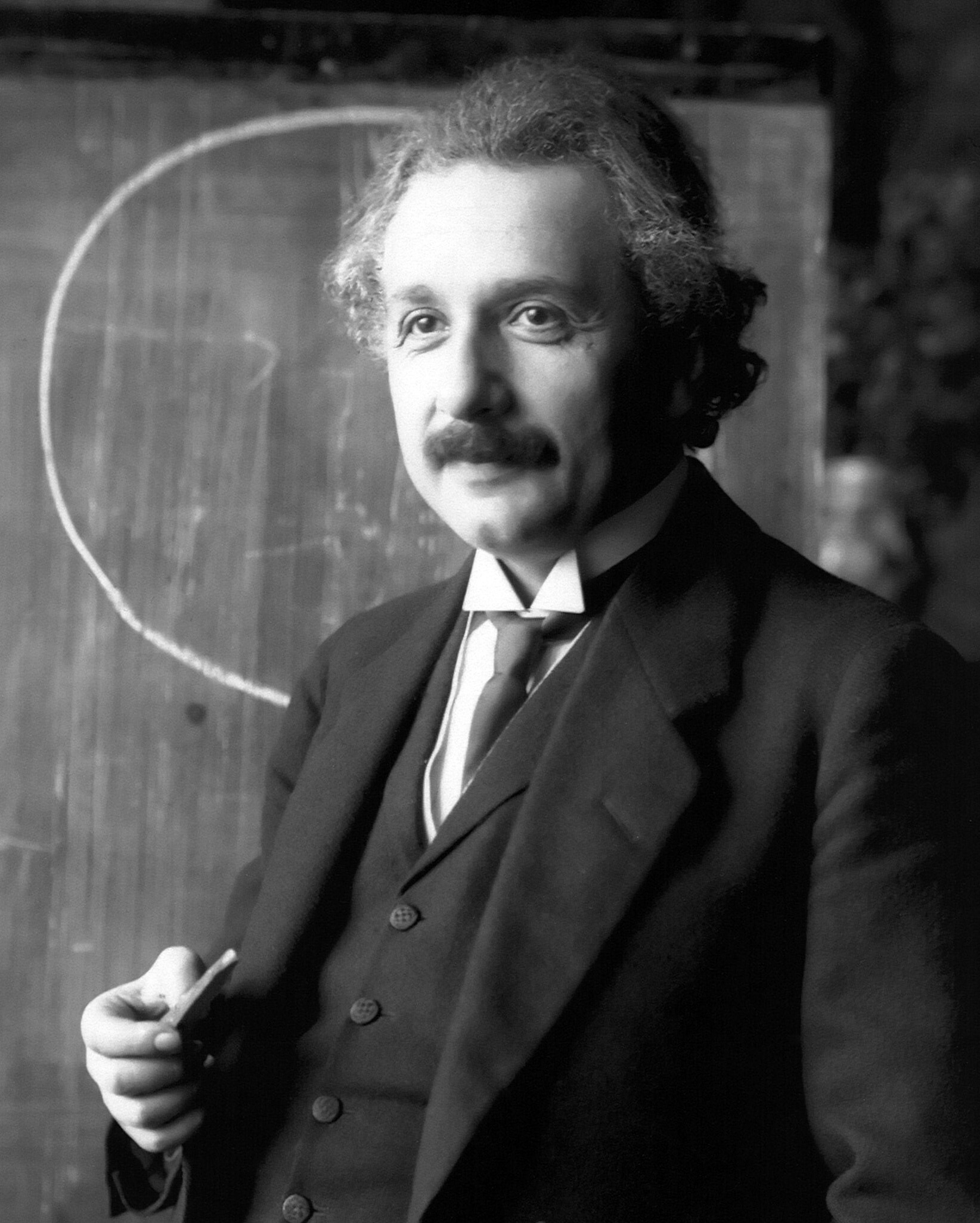
Albert Einstein is considered a pantheist by some commentators.

Dorion Sagan, son of scientist and science communicator Carl Sagan, published the 2007 book Dazzle Gradually: Reflections on the Nature of Nature, co-written with his mother Lynn Margulis. In the chapter "Truth of My Father", Sagan writes that his "father believed in the God of Spinoza and Einstein, God not behind nature, but as nature, equivalent to it."

In 2009, pantheism was mentioned in a papal encyclical and in a statement on New Year's Day, 2010, criticizing pantheism for denying the superiority of humans over nature and seeing the source of man's salvation in nature.

In 2015, The Paradise Project, an organization "dedicated to celebrating and spreading awareness about pantheism", commissioned Los Angeles muralist Levi Ponce to paint the 75-foot (23 m) mural in Venice, California, near the organization's offices. The mural depicts: Albert Einstein, Alan Watts, Baruch Spinoza, Terence McKenna, Carl Jung, Carl Sagan, Emily Dickinson, Nikola Tesla, Friedrich Nietzsche, Ralph Waldo Emerson, W.E.B. Du Bois, Henry David Thoreau, Elizabeth Cady Stanton, Rumi, Adi Shankara and Laozi.

== Categorizations ==
There are multiple varieties of pantheism and various systems of classifying them relying upon one or more spectra or in discrete categories.

=== Degree of determinism ===
The philosopher Charles Hartshorne used the term Classical Pantheism to describe the deterministic philosophies of Baruch Spinoza, the Stoics, and other like-minded figures. Pantheism (All-is-God) is often associated with monism (All-is-One) and some have suggested that it logically implies determinism (All-is-Now). Albert Einstein explained theological determinism by stating, "the past, present, and future are an 'illusion'". This form of pantheism has been referred to as "extreme monism", in which – in the words of one commentator – "God decides or determines everything, including our supposed decisions." Other examples of determinism-inclined pantheisms include those of Ralph Waldo Emerson, and Hegel.

However, some have argued against treating every meaning of "unity" as an aspect of pantheism, and there exist versions of pantheism that regard determinism as an inaccurate or incomplete view of nature. Examples include the beliefs of John Scotus Eriugena, Friedrich Wilhelm Joseph Schelling and William James.

=== Degree of belief ===
It may also be possible to distinguish two types of pantheism, one being more religious and the other being more philosophical. The Columbia Encyclopedia writes of the distinction:

"If the pantheist starts with the belief that the one great reality, eternal and infinite, is God, he sees everything finite and temporal as but some part of God. There is nothing separate or distinct from God, for God is the universe. If, on the other hand, the conception taken as the foundation of the system is that the great inclusive unity is the world itself, or the universe, God is swallowed up in that unity, which may be designated nature."

=== Form of monism ===
A diagram with neutral monism compared to Cartesian dualism, physicalism and idealism

Philosophers and theologians have often suggested that pantheism implies monism. (Note: Different types of monism include: 1. Substance monism, "the view that the apparent plurality of substances is due to different states or appearances of a single substance".; 2. Attributive monism, "the view that whatever the number of substances, they are of a single ultimate kind".; 3. Partial monism, "within a given realm of being (however many there may be) there is only one substance".; 4. Existence monism, the view that there is only one concrete object token (The One, "Τὸ Ἕν" or the Monad).; 5. Priority monism, "the whole is prior to its parts" or "the world has parts, but the parts are dependent fragments of an integrated whole."; 6. Property monism: the view that all properties are of a single type (e.g. only physical properties exist).; 7. Genus monism: "the doctrine that there is a highest category; e.g., being".; Views contrasting with monism are: Metaphysical dualism, which asserts that there are two ultimately irreconcilable substances or realities such as Good and Evil, for example, Manichaeism.; Metaphysical pluralism, which asserts three or more fundamental substances or realities.; Nihilism, negates any of the above categories (substances, properties, concrete objects, etc.).; Monism in modern philosophy of mind can be divided into three broad categories: 1. Idealism, phenomenalism, or mentalistic monism, which holds that only mind or spirit is real.; 2. Neutral monism, which holds that one sort of thing fundamentally exists, to which both the mental and the physical can be reduced.; 3. Material monism (also called Physicalism and Materialism), which holds that only the physical is real, and that the mental or spiritual can be reduced to the physical: a. Eliminative materialism, according to which everything is physical and mental things do not exist. b. Reductive physicalism, according to which mental things do exist and are a kind of physical thing, Such as Behaviourism, Type-identity theory and Functionalism. Certain positions do not fit easily into the above categories, such as functionalism, anomalous monism, and reflexive monism. Moreover, they do not define the meaning of "real".)

For the Aztecs teotl was the metaphysical omnipresence creating the cosmos and all its contents from within itself as well as out of itself. This is conceptualized in a kind of monistic pantheism as manifest in the supreme god Ometeotl, as well as a large pantheon of lesser gods and idealizations of natural phenomena.

=== Other ===
In 1896, J. H. Worman, a theologian, identified seven categories of pantheism: Mechanical or materialistic (God the mechanical unity of existence); Ontological (fundamental unity, Spinoza); Dynamic; Psychical (God is the soul of the world); Ethical (God is the universal moral order, Fichte); Logical (Hegel); and Pure (absorption of God into nature, which Worman equates with atheism).

In 1984, Paul D. Feinberg, professor of biblical and systematic theology at Trinity Evangelical Divinity School, also identified seven: Hylozoistic; Immanentistic; Absolutistic monistic; Relativistic monistic; Acosmic; Identity of opposites; and Neoplatonic or emanationistic.

== Demographics ==
=== Prevalence ===
According to censuses of 2011, the UK was the country with the most Pantheists. As of 2011, about 1,000 Canadians identified their religion as "Pantheist", representing 0.003% of the population. By 2021, the number of Canadian pantheists had risen to 1,855 (0.005%). In Ireland, Pantheism rose from 202 in 1991, to 1106 in 2002, to 1,691 in 2006, 1,940 in 2011. In New Zealand, there was exactly one pantheist man in 1901. By 1906, the number of pantheists in New Zealand had septupled to 7 (6 male, 1 female). This number had further risen to 366 by 2006.

Country	Subdivision(s)	Number	Year	Ref.
Australia		1,394 (0.006%)	2011	
Canada		1,855 (0.005%)	2021	
Canada	Quebec	75 (0.001%)	2011	
Canada	Ontario	295 (0.002%)	2011	
Canada	Nova Scotia	30 (0.003%)	2011	
Canada	New Brunswick	45 (0.006%)	2011	
Canada	Manitoba	40 (0.003%)	2011	
Canada	British Columbia	395 (0.008%)	2011	
Canada	Prince Edward Island	0 (0%)	2011	
Canada	Saskatchewan	25 (0.002%)	2011	
Canada	Alberta	125 (0.004%)	2011	
Canada	Newfoundland and Labrador	0 (0%)	2011	
Canada	Northwest Territories	0 (0%)	2011	
Canada	Yukon	0 (0%)	2011	
Canada	Nunavut	0 (0%)	2011	
Ireland		1,940 (0.04%)	2011	
Ireland	Border Region	179 (0.04%)	2006	
Ireland	Dublin	524 (0.04%)	2006	
Ireland	Mid-East Region	177	2006	
Ireland	Midland Region	118	2006	
Ireland	South-East Region	173	2006	
Ireland	South-West Region	270	2006	
Ireland	West Region	181	2006	
New Zealand		366 (0.009%)	2006	
United Kingdom	Scotland	60 (0.001%)	2001	
United Kingdom	England and Wales	2,216 (0.004%)	2011	
United Kingdom	Northern Ireland	29 (0.002%)	2011	
Uruguay		790 (0.02%)	2006	

=== Age, ethnicity, and gender ===
The 2021 Canadian census showed that pantheists were somewhat more likely to be in their 20s and 30s compared to the general population. People under 15 were about four times less likely to be pantheist than the general population.

The 2021 Canadian census also showed that pantheists were less likely to be part of a recognized minority group compared to the general population, with 90.3% of pantheists not being part of any minority group (compared to 73.5% of the general population). The census did not register any pantheists who were Arab, Southeast Asian, West Asian, Korean, or Japanese.

In Canada (2011), there was no gender difference in regards to pantheism. However, in Ireland (2011), pantheists were slightly more likely to be female (1074 pantheists, 0.046% of women) than male (866 pantheists, 0.038% of men). In contrast, Canada (2021) showed pantheists to be slightly more likely to be male, with men representing 51.5% of pantheists.

Comparison of pantheists in Canada against the general population (2021)
		General population	Pantheists
Total population		36,328,480	1,855
Gender	Male	17,937,165 (49.4%)	955 (51.5%)
Gender	Female	18,391,315 (50.6%)	895 (48.2%)
Age	0 to 14	5,992,555 (16.5%)	75 (4%)
Age	15 to 19	2,003,200 (5.5%)	40 (2%)
Age	20 to 24	2,177,860 (6%)	125 (6.7%)
Age	25 to 34	4,898,625 (13.5%)	405 (21.8%)
Age	35 to 44	4,872,425 (13.4%)	380 (20.5%)
Age	45 to 54	4,634,850 (12.8%)	245 (13.2%)
Age	55 to 64	5,162,365 (14.2%)	245 (13.2%)
Age	65 and over	6,586,600 (18.1%)	325 (17.5%)
Ethnicity	Non-minority	26,689,275 (73.5%)	1,675 (90.3%)
Ethnicity	South Asian	2,571,400 (7%)	20 (1.1%)
Ethnicity	Chinese	1,715,770 (4.7%)	45 (2.4%)
Ethnicity	Black	1,547,870 (4.3%)	45 (2.4%)
Ethnicity	Filipino	957,355 (2.6%)	10 (0.5%)
Ethnicity	Arab	694,015 (1.9%)	0 (0%)
Ethnicity	Latin American	580,235 (1.6%)	25 (1.3%)
Ethnicity	Southeast Asian	390,340 (1.1%)	0 (0%)
Ethnicity	West Asian	360,495 (1%)	0 (0%)
Ethnicity	Korean	218,140 (0.6%)	0 (0%)
Ethnicity	Japanese	98,890 (0.3%)	0 (0%)
Ethnicity	Visible minority, n.i.e.	172,885 (0.5%)	0 (0%)
Ethnicity	Multiple visible minorities	331,805 (0.9%)	15 (0.8%)

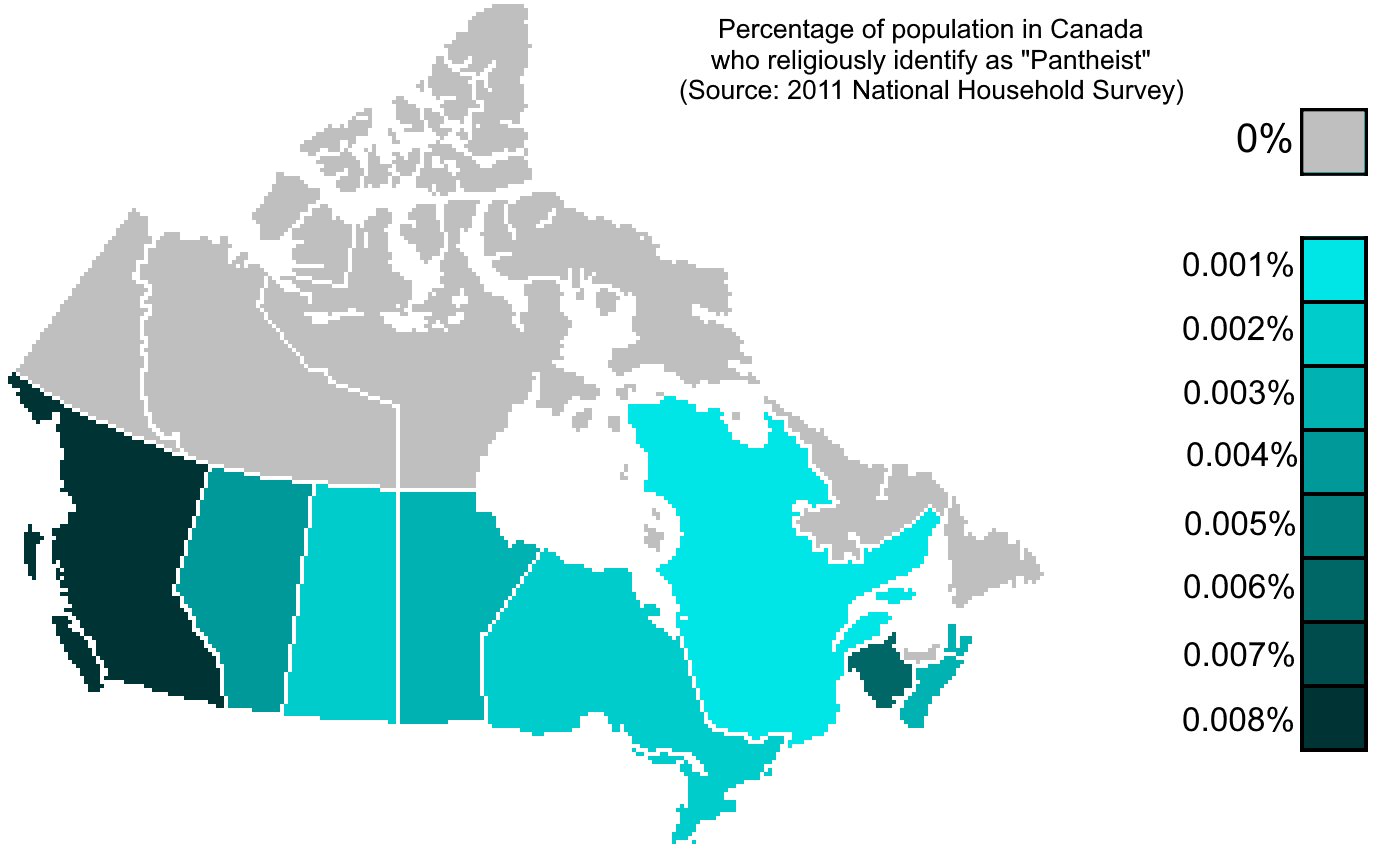
Canadian pantheist population by percentage (2011 National Household Survey)

== Related concepts ==
Nature worship, or nature mysticism, is often conflated and confused with pantheism. It is pointed out by at least one expert, Harold Wood, founder of the Universal Pantheist Society, that in pantheist philosophy, Spinoza's identification of God with nature is very different from a recent idea of a self-identifying pantheist with environmental ethical concerns. His use of the word nature to describe his worldview may differ greatly from the "nature" of modern science. He and other nature mystics who also identify as pantheists use "nature" to refer to the limited natural environment (as opposed to artificial built environment). This use of "nature" differs from the broader use by Spinoza and other pantheists, who describe natural laws and the overall phenomena of the physical world. Nature mysticism may be compatible with pantheism, but it may also be compatible with theism and other views. Pantheism has also been involved in animal worship especially in primal religions.

Nontheism is an umbrella term used to refer to a variety of religions that do not fit traditional theism, and it has been used to include pantheism.

Panentheism (from Greek πᾶν (pân) "all"; ἐν (en) "in"; and θεός (theós) "God"; "all-in-God") was formally coined in Germany in the 19th century in an attempt to offer a philosophical synthesis between traditional theism and pantheism, stating that God is substantially omnipresent in the physical universe but also exists "apart from" or "beyond" it as its Creator and Sustainer. Thus panentheism separates itself from pantheism, positing the extra claim that God exists above and beyond the world as we know it. The line between pantheism and panentheism can be blurred depending on varying definitions of God, so there have been disagreements when assigning particular notable figures to pantheism or panentheism.

Pandeism is another word derived from pantheism, and is characterized as a combination of reconcilable elements of pantheism and deism. It assumes a Creator-deity that is at some point distinct from the universe and then transforms into it, resulting in a universe similar to the pantheistic one in present essence, but differing in origin.

Panpsychism is the philosophical view that consciousness, mind, or soul is a universal feature of all things. Some pantheists also subscribe to the distinct philosophical views hylozoism (or panvitalism), the view that everything is alive, and its close neighbor animism, the view that everything has a soul or spirit.

== Pantheism in religion ==
=== Traditional religions ===
Many traditional and folk religions, including African traditional religions and Native American religions, can be seen as pantheistic or a mixture of pantheism and other worldviews, such as polytheism and animism. According to pantheists, there are elements of pantheism in some forms of Christianity, although this is not found in traditional Christian denominations such as Catholicism or Orthodoxy.

Ideas resembling pantheism existed in Eastern religions before the 18th century (notably Hinduism, Confucianism and Taoism). Although there is no evidence that these influenced Spinoza's work, there is evidence regarding other contemporary philosophers, such as Leibniz, and later Voltaire. In the case of Hinduism, pantheistic views exist alongside: panentheistic, polytheistic, monotheistic and atheistic ones.

=== Spirituality and new religious movements ===
Pantheism is popular in modern spirituality and new religious movements, such as Neopaganism and Theosophy. Two organizations that specify the word pantheism in their title formed in the last quarter of the 20th century. The Universal Pantheist Society, open to all varieties of pantheists and supportive of environmental causes, was founded in 1975. The World Pantheist Movement is headed by Paul Harrison, an environmentalist, writer and a former vice president of the Universal Pantheist Society, from which he resigned in 1996. The World Pantheist Movement was incorporated in 1999 to focus exclusively on promoting naturalistic pantheism – a strict metaphysical naturalistic version of pantheism, considered by some a form of religious naturalism. It has been described as an example of "dark green religion" with a focus on environmental ethics.

== See also ==
- Animism
- Biocentrism (ethics)
- Irreligion
- List of pantheists
- Monism
- Mother nature
- Nondualism
- Panentheism
- Theopanism, a term philosophically distinct but derived from the same root words
- Worship of heavenly bodies

== Sources ==
- Bowker, John (2000a), "Advaita Vedanta", The Concise Oxford Dictionary of World Religions, Oxford University Press, ISBN 978-0-19-280094-7, archived from the original on 5 January 2022
- Deutsch, Eliot (1973), Advaita Vedanta: A Philosophical Reconstruction, University of Hawaii Press, ISBN 978-0-8248-0271-4
- Deutsch, Eliot (1988), Advaita Vedanta: A Philosophical Reconstruction, University of Hawaii Press, ISBN 0-88706-662-3
- Fowler, Jeaneane D. (1997), Hinduism: Beliefs and Practices, Sussex Academic Press
- Fowler, Jeaneane D. (2002), Perspectives of Reality: An Introduction to the Philosophy of Hinduism, Sussex Academic Press
- Hacker, Paul (1995), Philology and Confrontation: Paul Hacker on Traditional and Modern Vedanta, SUNY Press, ISBN 978-0-7914-2582-4
- Indich, William (2000), Consciousness in Advaita Vedanta, Motilal Banarsidass, ISBN 978-8120812512
- King, Richard (1995), Early Advaita Vedānta and Buddhism: The Mahāyāna Context of the Gauḍapādīya-kārikā, SUNY Press
- Koller, John M. (2013), "Shankara", in Meister, Chad; Copan, Paul (eds.), Routledge Companion to Philosophy of Religion, Routledge
- Levine, Michael (1994), Pantheism: A Non-Theistic Concept of Deity, Psychology Press, ISBN 9780415070645
- Long, Jeffrey D. (2011), Historical Dictionary of Hinduism, Scarecrow Press
- Malkovsky, Bradley J. (2000), "Samkara on Divine Grace", in Malkovsky, Bradley J. (ed.), New Perspectives on Advaita Vedānta: Essays in Commemoration of Professor Richard De Smet, S.J., Bill, ISBN 978-9004120440
- Mayeda, Sengaku (1992), "An Introduction to the Life and Thought of Sankara", in Mayeda, Sengaku (ed.), A Thousand Teachings: The Upadeśasāhasrī of Śaṅkara, State University of New York City Press, ISBN 0-7914-0944-9
- Menon, Sangeetha (2012), Advaita Vedanta, Internet Encyclopedia of Philosophy
- Milne, Joseph (April 1997), "Advaita Vedanta and typologies of multiplicity and unity: An interpretation of nindual knowledge", International Journal of Hindu Studies, 1 (1): 165–188, doi:10.1007/s11407-997-0017-6, S2CID 143690641
- Mohanty, JN (1980), "Understanding some Ontological Differences in Indian Philosophy", Journal of Indian Philosophy, 8 (3): 205–217, doi:10.1007/BF00166295, S2CID 145752220
- Sivananda, Swami (1993), All About Hinduism, The Divine Life Society
- Urmson, James Opie (1991), The Concise Encyclopedia of Western Philosophy and Philosophers, Routledge
- Brugger, Walter, ed. (1972), Diccionario de Filosofía, Barcelona: Herder, art. dualismo, monismo, pluralismo
- Mandik, Pete (2010), Key Terms in Philosophy of Mind, Continuum International Publish.
