= Davis Langdon =

Former British construction consultancy company

Davis Langdon, An AECOM Company (also known as PCC in Europe and the Americas).
- Industry: Construction, consultancy, real estate
- Founded: 1919
- Headquarters: London, United Kingdom
- Products: Cost management; project and program management
- Number of employees: 2,500
- Parent: AECOM
- Website: www.davislangdon.com

Davis Langdon was a construction consultancy company originally founded in London in 1919, which grew to approximately 2,500 employees working in over 18 countries worldwide. In October 2010, the company was acquired by AECOM, with its operations outside Australasia and Asia rebranded as AECOM in 2013.

== History ==
Horace William Langdon established a quantity surveying practice in Holborn, London in 1919, and worked for a time in partnership (dissolved 1927) with a John Belmont Taylor. In 1921, Cecil Tom Every joined Langdon's practice, and they formed Langdon & Every in 1928, which expanded to operate in the Middle East, Australasia and Asia Pacific regions as well as in the UK. (Langdon was a local councillor and served as mayor of the Metropolitan Borough of Holborn (1935–1936); Every was Director of Post-War Building Programmes at the Ministry of Works, recognised with a CBE in the 1946 New Year Honours.)

In 1931, another quantity surveying practice was established by Owen Davis. Cambridge graduate and QS John Belfield joined Davis establishing a partnership, Davis & Belfield, in 1935. In 1944, they formed a new partnership with Bobbie Everest (a descendant of George Everest, surveyor general of India and the namesake for Mount Everest), becoming Davis, Belfield & Everest.

Langdon & Every merged with Davis Belfield & Everest in 1988 to become Davis Langdon & Everest. In 2004, Davis Langdon & Everest was converted to a Limited Liability Partnership to become Davis Langdon LLP.

In October 2004, Davis Langdon announced the launch of a regional restructuring programme. The mid 2000s saw substantial growth for the company, particularly in the project management sector.

In April 2007, Davis Langdon recorded an annual pre-tax profit of £41 million, a year-on-year rise in excess of 25 percent; that same year, the firm acquired the Scottish-centric consultancy Mackenzie Partnership, which it promptly opted to combine with its pre-existing Scottish operation. It also opted to open smaller offices separate to its traditional centrally-located counterparts in order to boost the firm's appeal to potential new hires.

In May 2008, Davis Langdon opted to restructure the business towards the programme management segment; six months later, it announced the loss of 90 UK-based jobs. In December 2008, the firm announced that it would expand its presence by 20 percent in multiple Middle Eastern countries, including Bahrain, Abu Dhabi, and Qatar.

In October 2009, Davis Langdon enacted a further 64 job cuts, including at the partner level. That same year, the company engaged in several acquisitions in order to broaden their range of services offered.

In January 2010, it was announced that the firm's profit levels had declined by 55 percent across the Europe and Gulf markets.

=== AECOM era ===
In early 2010, speculation arose over the company's potential acquisition by two different US-based companies, Jacobs Solutions and AECOM Technology Corporate. In August of that year, it was announced that AECOM would purchase Davis Langdon; two months later, the company was integrated into AECOM. Accordingly, Davis Langdon became known globally as AECOM's Program, Cost, Consultancy team, and its services were publicly presented as Davis Langdon, An AECOM Company.

In 2011, the company announced that was reorienting its growth strategy towards the Australia, New Zealand and US markets. Almost half of the Davis Langdon's equity-holding partners opted to leave the firm within 18 months of the takeover.

On 1 October 2013, the company was rebranded as AECOM in Europe, the Middle East, Africa and the Americas. In Australia and New Zealand however, the company continues to be known as Davis Langdon, An AECOM Company. Furthermore, in Asia, it is known as Davis Langdon KPK, An AECOM Company, which incorporates the name of KPK – an Asia-based company specialising in construction estimation and contract management consultancy that was acquired by AECOM in 2012.

== Services ==
The specific services offered globally by the company include cost consultancy, project management, CDM coordinator and health and safety services, management consulting, legal support, specification consulting, engineering services, fiscal incentives advice and facilities management. The company provides these services for clients investing in infrastructure, property and construction and has worked on a number of high-profile projects including the Olympic Park for the 2012 Summer Olympics in London; Tate Modern and the Eden Project in the United Kingdom; Estádio do Dragão in Portugal; Abu Dhabi International Airport; Grand Egyptian Museum in Cairo, Egypt; The Gateway Bridge Upgrade in Brisbane, Australia; the San Francisco Transbay Terminal, U.S.; the Gautrain Rapid Rail Link in Johannesburg, and Green Point, Cape Town – built for the 2010 FIFA World Cup – in Cape Town, South Africa.

== List of notable projects ==
Projects worked on by Davis Langdon, An AECOM Company include:

- Adelaide Botanic Garden, Australia
- Alexandria Library, Egypt
- Anchorage Museum at Rasmuson Center, Anchorage, Alaska
- Baha Mar Resort, Bahamas
- Beirut Central District, Lebanon
- Birmingham Central Library, UK
- British Council, Egypt
- British Embassy, Bahrain
- British Empire and Commonwealth Museum "Abolition of Slavery Exhibition", Bristol, UK
- Central Bank of Kuwait
- Central Terminal Building, Johannesburg International Airport, South Africa
- Children's Hospital of Philadelphia
- Commercial Bank Tower, Doha, State of Qatar
- Commerzbank, Frankfurt
- Cooper Union for the Advancement of Science and Art, New York City
- Dubai Waterfront, UAE
- Dublin Airport – Terminal 2
- Eastside, Birmingham, UK
- Eden Project, Cornwall, UK
- Elephant House, Copenhagen Zoo
- Gateway Bridge Upgrade, Brisbane, Australia
- Grand Egyptian Museum
- Jumeirah Beach Hotel, Dubai, UAE
- Legoland, Germany
- London 2012 Summer Olympics – Olympic Park, East London
- Mall of the Emirates, Dubai
- Mondavi Center for the Arts, University of California, Davis, California, USA
- National Waterfront Museum, Swansea, UK
- Paradise project delivering Liverpool 1, Liverpool, UK
- Rennes Viaduct, France
- Royal Festival Hall, London, UK
- Shard London Bridge, London, UK
- Smithsonian Institution, Patent Office Building, Washington DC, USA
- Tate Modern, London, UK
- The Lakes Resort, Cairns, Australia
- The Liverpool Arena and Convention Centre at Kings Waterfront, Liverpool, UK
- Theatre Royal, Norwich, Norwich, UK
- V&A Waterfront Marina, Cape Town, South Africa
- Westfield Shopping Centre, West London
