= Arithmetica Universalis =

Book by Isaac Newton

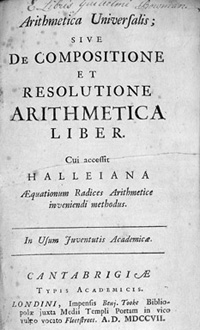
Arithmetica Title page (1707)

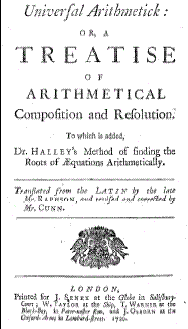
Raphson 's Eng. Tr. (1720)

Arithmetica Universalis ("Universal Arithmetic") is a mathematics text by Isaac Newton. Written in Latin, it was edited and published by William Whiston, Newton's successor as Lucasian Professor of Mathematics at the University of Cambridge. The Arithmetica was based on Newton's lecture notes.

== Publication history ==
Whiston's original edition was published in 1707. It was translated into English by Joseph Raphson, who published it in 1720 as the Universal Arithmetick. John Machin published a second Latin edition in 1722.

== Lack of credit for the writer ==
None of these editions credit Newton as author; Newton was unhappy with the publication of the Arithmetica, and so refused to have his name appear. In fact, when Whiston's edition was published, Newton was so upset he considered purchasing all of the copies so he could destroy them.

== Content ==
The Arithmetica touches on algebraic notation, arithmetic, the relationship between geometry and algebra, and the solution of equations. Newton also applied Descartes's rule of signs to imaginary roots. He also offered, without proof, a rule to determine the number of imaginary roots of polynomial equations. A rigorous proof of Newton's counting formula for equations up to and including the fifth degree was published by James Joseph Sylvester in 1864.
