= Classical pantheism =

Classical Pantheism, as defined by Charles Hartshorne in 1953, is the theological deterministic philosophies of pantheists such as Baruch Spinoza and the Stoics. Hartshorne sought to distinguish panentheism, which rejects determinism, from deterministic pantheism.

The term has also been used to mean Pantheism in the classical Greek and Roman era, or archetypal pantheism as variously defined by different authors.

== Hartshorne's Classical Pantheism ==
This usage of the term Classical Pantheism was first presented by Charles Hartshorne in 1953, and by others discussing his presentation. In making his case for panentheism, Hartshorne sought to distinguish panentheism, which rejects determinism, from deterministic pantheism.

The term "pantheism" is derived from Greek words pan (πᾶν, "all") and theos (θεός, "God"), together meaning "All-God" or "All is God." It is often associated with monism, the view that reality is a single thing.

The Encyclopedia of Religion refers to this form of Pantheism as an "extreme monism," stating that in Classical Pantheism, "God decides or determines everything, including our supposed decisions." Other examples of deterministic-inclined pantheisms include the views of Ralph Waldo Emerson, Ernst Haeckel, and Georg Wilhelm Friedrich Hegel.

== Quotations ==
The following quotations illustrate Hartshorne's concept of Classical Pantheism:

- "For no particular thing, not even the smallest, can have happened otherwise than in accordance with the common nature and its reason." - Chrysippus
- "In the mind there is no absolute or free will; but the mind is determined to wish this or that by a cause, which has also been determined by another cause, and this last by another cause, and so on to infinity." - Baruch Spinoza

== Other uses of "Classical Pantheism" ==
- Typical or archetypal pantheism. This usage varies according to the judgement of the writer as to what constitutes typical or archetypal pantheism, but usually includes Spinoza.
- Pantheism of the Classical period, specifically Ancient Greece and Rome (for example, Stoicism).

== See also ==
- Pantheism
- Determinism
- Stoicism
