= Luminaries of Pantheism =

Mural by Levi Ponce in Venice, Los Angeles, California

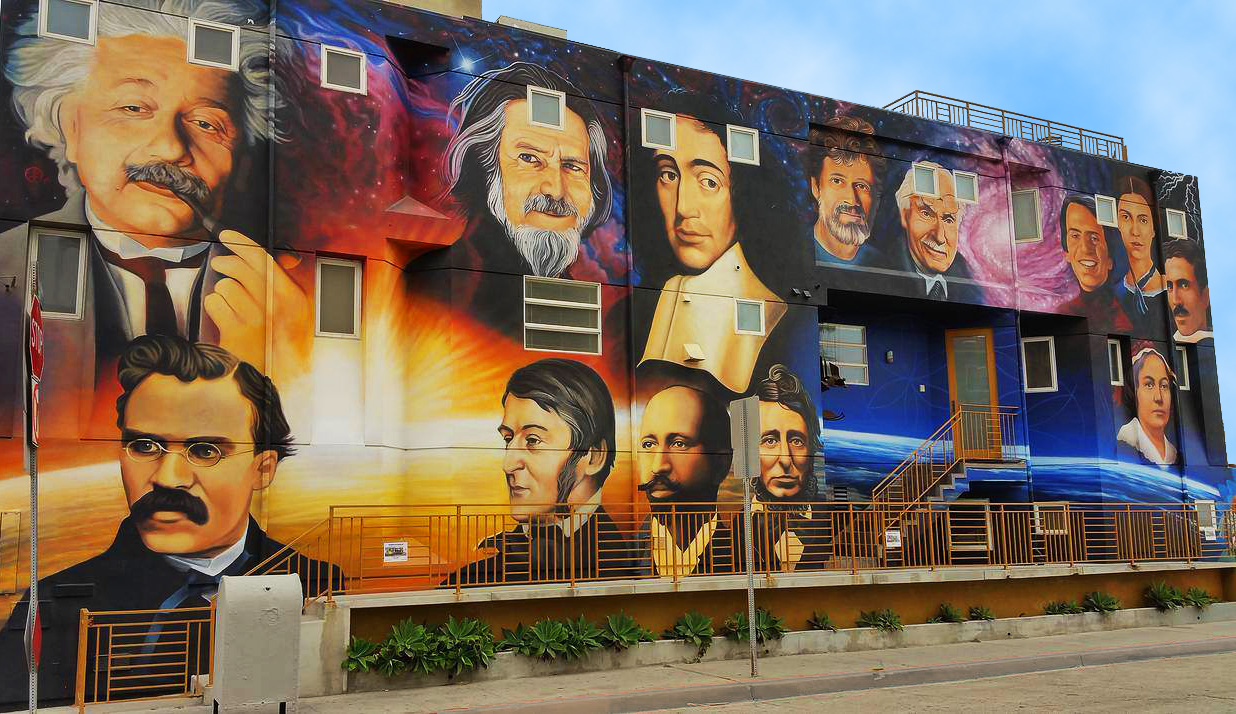
- The mural at The Paradise Project's headquarters in Venice, Los Angeles
- Artist: Levi Ponce
- Year: 2015
- Location: Venice, Los Angeles, California, U.S.
- 33.9838°N 118.4707°W

Luminaries of Pantheism is a 75-foot-long (23 m) mural by Levi Ponce, commissioned in 2015 by The Paradise Project for its headquarters in Venice, Los Angeles, in the U.S. state of California.

== Description and development ==
The mural was conceived by the project's founder, Perry Rod, and designed by graphic designer Peter Moriarty. The painting covers an entire wall of the organization's headquarters and depicts sixteen people: Albert Einstein, Alan Watts, Baruch Spinoza, Terence McKenna, Carl Jung, Carl Sagan, Emily Dickinson, Nikola Tesla, Friedrich Nietzsche, Ralph Waldo Emerson, W.E.B. Du Bois, Henry David Thoreau, Elizabeth Cady Stanton, Rumi, Adi Shankara, and Lao Tzu.

== Reception ==
A documentary about the mural, Luminaries by film director Ed Moy, was awarded the Audience Award at the Marina Del Rey film festival. It features The Paradise Project's Chairman, board members Nika Avila and Chuck Beebe, mural designer Peter Moriarty, muralist Levi Ponce.

== See also ==
- List of public art in Los Angeles
- Murals of Los Angeles
