= Kristy Sandoval =

American muralist

Kristy Sandoval (born 1983) is a Xicana muralist based out of the Northeast San Fernando Valley of Los Angeles, California.

== Background ==
She has painted over fifty murals since the start of her art career and has painted murals in Turkey. Sandoval is a featured artist and founder of Pacoima's Mural Mile and also works as Program and Volunteer Manager for Casa Esperanza. In 2017 she worked as a spokesperson for the NFL's Los Angeles Rams in collaboration to promote "Mi Cuidad, Mi Eqipo, Mis Rams" and celebrate Hispanic Heritage month. Notable award was in 2016 received the Phenomenal Woman Award by the Department of Gender & Women's Studies at Cal State University Northridge.

Sandoval studied at the Academy of Art University, receiving her BA in Web Design and New Media (2002-2007)

== Art ==
- Decolonized 2015 is a mural part of Pacoima's Mural Mile. It features a woman who has blue hairs in the style of dreads and a tattoo on her left arm of Aztec Moon Goddess Coyolxauhqui. She uses a window with bars over it to create a cage image that has parrots and butterflies being set free.
- Being human, human being 22' x 50' is a mural that shows two crows perched on a bones with a background representing a serape. This piece is located in (Kadikoy) Istanbul, Turkey and was painted during the Mural Istanbul Festival (2015) where Sandoval was the first woman to participate.
- Assada Shakur 15' x 45' is another mural located on Pacoima's Mural Mile. This mural features Assata Shakur, an African American Freedom Fighter, author and political activist surrounded by flowers and the phrase "A Womyn's Place is in the Struggle". Sandoval was intentional in her spelling to try and show support to women with showing the word man is not needed to define them. She painted this mural as a collaboration with the HOOD Sisters.
