= World Pantheist Movement =

Pantheist organization

The World Pantheist Movement (WPM) is an international organization which promotes naturalistic pantheism, a philosophy which asserts that spirituality should be centered on nature. Paul Harrison is their founder and president.

== External appearance ==
Its symbol is the spiral as seen in the curves of the nautilus shell, which embodies the Fibonacci series and the golden ratio.

== Beliefs and practice ==
The WPM uses the term "divine" rather than "god" and states that the universe as a whole is one with and or reflection of divinity. It has developed a pantheist credo as a guide (not indispensable set of rules for the members) and sees the universe as an everlasting, diverse and self-organized unit. All human beings are part of it and should therefore preserve the nature. The main focus is based on scientific pantheism and a naturalistic approach with reverence to the physical universe, oriented towards environmentalism with respect for human and animal rights.
