= Levi Ponce =

American painter

- Born: Pacoima, Los Angeles, California, US
- Known for: Painting
- Website: www.leviponce.com

Levi Ponce is an American artist noted for his public portrait murals throughout urban areas of the San Fernando Valley and Southern California.

== Early life and career ==
Ponce was born in the Pacoima neighborhood of Los Angeles, California. Ponce attended Cleveland High School (Los Angeles) and graduated from the high school in 2005. In Ponce's high school years, Ponce joined the Reserve Officers' Training Corps. It was through the Corps, in which Ponce came across First Sergeant Rudy Sullivan, whom helped Ponce meet his potential.

He studied animation and graphic design at California State University (Northridge), and received a bachelor's degree in art. Ponce obtained a bachelor's degree in 2D art with a focus in 3D animation. Ponce was influenced by his father, Hector Ponce, a sign painter and muralist whose work appears on many storefronts in Pacoima. Ponce grew up being involved in murals as his father would paint murals, Ponce was inspired to become a muralist thanks to the reaction that his father would receive when his father was done with a mural. Ponce said "the support and respect and the praise and the recognition that locals would give him when he painted in their community was something that I didn’t see anywhere else."

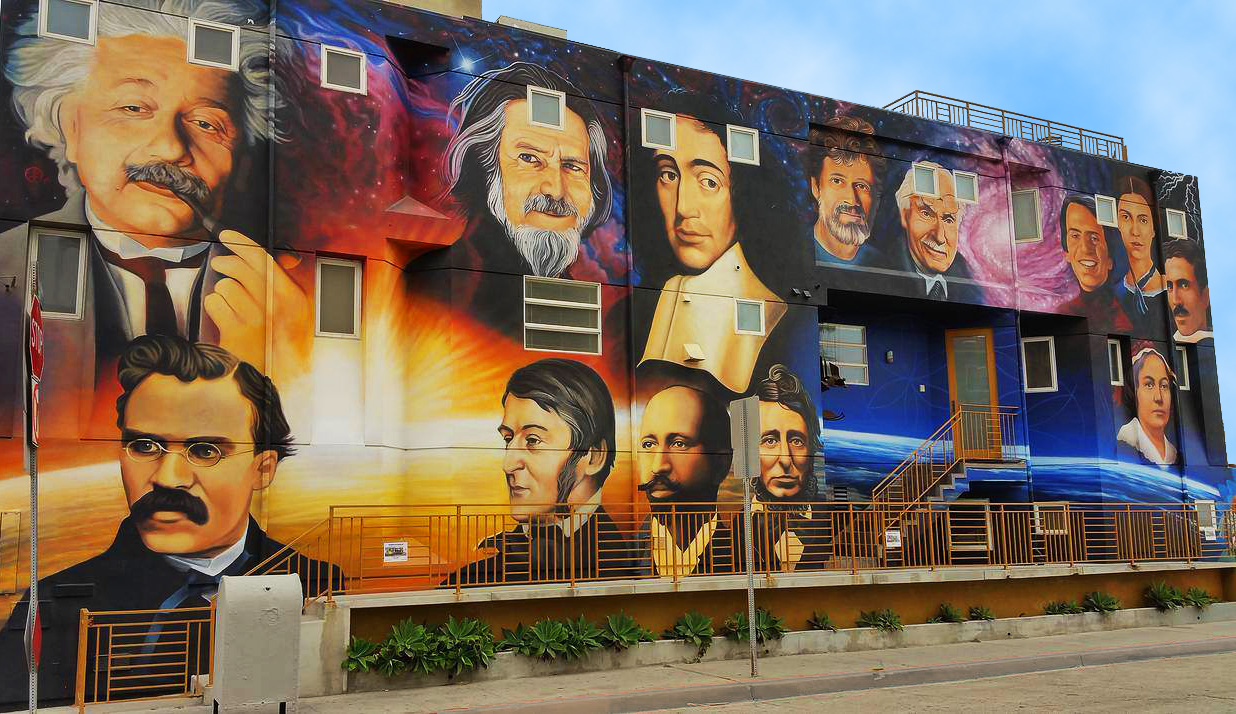
Levi Ponce's Luminaries of Pantheism in Venice, California

In 2011, Ponce began installing murals on the sides of buildings in poorer neighborhoods of the San Fernando Valley. Ponce began to paint his first few murals in Pacoima because it is his hometown and Ponce always saw artwork in other neighborhoods, but never in Pacoima. Ponce's hometown has also influenced his artwork. Ponce uses his art to address issues that impact the Latino community such as liberty, immigration, and the environment.

Ponce is noted for his influence on what has become known as "Mural Mile", a strip of Van Nuys Boulevard in Pacoima once covered in graffiti and defaced storefronts. Ponce began painting murals along walls facing the street, and was joined by other artists. All of the murals that Ponce painted on Van Nuys Boulevard, Ponce paid with his own money. Early in his career, Ponce paid for many of his murals.

Ponce's art sometimes take the form of a community project, as volunteers are welcome to assist with public murals. Ponce stated that when he began to paint his murals, he only had 3 volunteers, but after his tenth mural he had 70 volunteers. Ponce allows for kids, students, and strangers to help in the mural, Ponce stated upon allowing people to help "'Everybody comes together to make this happen and I think that’s my biggest accomplishment, being able to rally the troops.'" "These are our artists here in Pacoima", said Ponce, "they don't have galleries. They don't have schools or universities and museums. When I say come help paint, it's like a gift to them".

Canvas works by Ponce have been exhibited at The MACAY in Mérida, the Craft and Folk Art Museum in Los Angeles, and at California State University in Northridge. Ponce painted a mural of Judy Garland in her The Wizard of Oz (1939 film) character near Theatre West, which he still considers unfinished. Ponce received an honorary lifetime membership thanks to his mural.

In 2014, MSN Latino listed Ponce as one of "10 Latinos to Watch in 2014", describing his murals as "a truly marvelous and original way of beautifying the city, street by street".

In 2015, Ponce was commissioned to paint "Luminaries of Pantheism" for an area in Venice, California that receives over a million onlookers per year. The mural painting depicts Albert Einstein, Alan Watts, Baruch Spinoza, Terence McKenna, Carl Jung, Carl Sagan, Emily Dickinson, Nikola Tesla, Friedrich Nietzsche, Ralph Waldo Emerson, W.E.B. Du Bois, Henry David Thoreau, Elizabeth Cady Stanton, Rumi, Adi Shankara, and Lao Tzu. A documentary of the mural entitled “Luminaries” by film director Ed Moy was awarded the Audience Award at the Marina Del Rey film festival. It features Ponce and others involved with the project.

Ponce currently works for New Deal Studios in Sylmar, as an animator. After Ponce clocks out from his day-job, Ponce begins to look at walls to find out where his next mural may go up next.

== Works ==
Title, date, location	Description
Pacoima Trejo: December 2011; 13403 Van Nuys Boulevard, Pacoima	Mural of actor Danny Trejo on a wall facing a restaurant. Pacoima's Christmas parade followed a route along which the mural could be viewed, with Trejo the parade's grand marshal. Painted using brushes and acrylic house paint.
Sunny Slopes: March 2012; 11000 Dronfield Avenue, Pacoima	Mural at Pacoima Little League Baseball and Softball Park. Painted using brushes and acrylic house paint.
The Pacoima Art Revolution: June 2012; 13349 Van Nuys Boulevard, Pacoima	Mural of Mona Lisa holding a sombrero and a dagger, representing La Adelita, a female warrior from a Mexican folk tale. Painted by Ponce, with assistance from R@H and Kristy Sandoval.
I Was Born in East Valley: November 2012; 13958 Van Nuys Boulevard, Pacoima	A tribute to the East Valley and those who grew up there. Featured is Cheech Marin, with landmarks including Whiteman Airport, four towers in Sunland, and a plane representing the one that crash into Pacoima Junior High School in 1957. Painted by Ponce, with assistance from Steven Acevedo, Erica Friend, Monica Cano, Leo Tejeda, Sesor, the Mendez Family, the Rhee Family, Alee Ponce, and the Alvarez Sisters, using brushes and acrylic house paint.
The Day The Music Died: November 2012; 13433 Van Nuys Boulevard, Pacoima	A tribute to Ritchie Valens of Pacoima, who died in a 1959 plane crash. A 1959 Chevy is depicted driving through Iowa, alluding to a Don McLean song about the incident. Painted by Ponce, with assistance from Sidro Candelario, Leonardo Tejeda, Alee Ponce, Erica Friend, Monica Cano, using brushes and acrylic house paint.
Lady of the Valley: December 2012; 14015 Van Nuys Boulevard, Pacoima	A reflection of the East Valley culture. Painted by Ponce, with assistance from "The Gr818ers ft. Serv One", using brushes and acrylic house paint.
Olmos: February 2013; 13349 Van Nuys Boulevard, Pacoima	A portrait of Edward James Olmos, with graffiti-style imagery. Painted by Ponce, with assistance from Mute, Sesor, and others, using brushes, acrylic house paint, and aerosol cans.
Pacoimeras (Pacoima Neighborhood Mural): February 2013; 10335 Laurel Canyon Boulevard, Pacoima	A reflection of the Pacoima neighborhood, with an emphasis on the women who live there. The lower half of the mural features two women lounging in a painted field of the national flowers of El Salvador, Guatemala, Honduras, Nicaragua, Mexico, and the United States. Monarch butterflies symbolize migration, and in a stained-glass window are loteria cards, reflecting traditional Latino culture. Painted using brushes and acrylic house paint.
The Girl With the Hoop Earring: March 2013; 14001 Van Nuys Boulevard, Arleta	Painted on the concrete face of a liquor store. Ponce said he wanted to "bring Vermeer to Pacoima", referring to Dutch painter Johannes Vermeer. Painted using brushes and acrylic house paint.
La Lady Liberty: July 2013; 13083 Van Nuys Boulevard, Pacoima	Painted by Levi Ponce, with assistance from Isidro Candelario, Manny Velazquez, Anat Ronen, Thomas Prado, and Rosa, using brushes and acrylic paint.
Tribute to Rembrandt: August 2013; 7041 Reseda Boulevard, Reseda	A homage to Rembrandt, painted on a wall of Continental Art Supplies, using brushes and Modern Masters acrylic paint.
Photos y Recuerdos: November 2013 on Day of the Dead; Plaza de la Raza in Lincoln Park, 3540 North Mission Road, Lincoln Heights	Painted using brushes and acrylic house paint.
Logic and Imagination: December 2013; back wall of Magnolia Science Academic, 18238 Sherman Way, Reseda	Portrait mural of Albert Einstein. Ponce's intent was to raise awareness of science, technology, engineering and math (STEM) education, while presenting an inspiring role model to students. Painted using brushes and acrylic house paint.
Dali Comes to Pacoima: 2013; 13708 Filmore Street, Pacoima	Portrait mural of Salvador Dalí, using acrylic house paint.
Soliloquy: February 2014; 4900 Lankershim Boulevard, Los Angeles	Mural of a woman holding a scull. Painted using brushes and acrylic paint.
Luminaries of Pantheism: April 2015; 2201 Ocean Front Walk, Venice, CA	Mural of portraits of notable pantheists, sponsored by The Paradise Project: Albert Einstein, Alan Watts, Baruch Spinoza, Terence McKenna, Carl Jung, Carl Sagan, Emily Dickinson, Nikola Tesla, Friedrich Nietzsche, Ralph Waldo Emerson, W.E.B. Du Bois, Henry David Thoreau, Elizabeth Cady Stanton, Rumi, Adi Shankara, and Lao Tzu.
Dorothy: 2018; 3333 W. Cahuenga Blvd., Los Angeles	Portrait mural of Judy Garland in her role of Dorothy from The Wizard of Oz.
