= Joseph Raphson =

English mathematician and intellectual

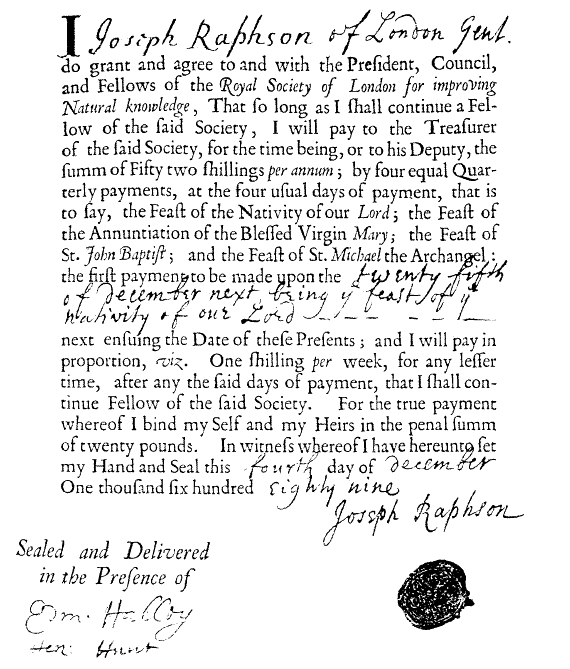
- Bond signed by Joseph Raphson on his admittance to the Royal Society
- Born: c. 1668; Middlesex, England
- Died: c. 1712; England
- Education: University of Cambridge
- Known for: Newton–Raphson method
- Scientific career
- Fields: Mathematician

Joseph Raphson (c. 1668 – c. 1715) was an English mathematician and intellectual known best for the Newton–Raphson method.

== Biography ==
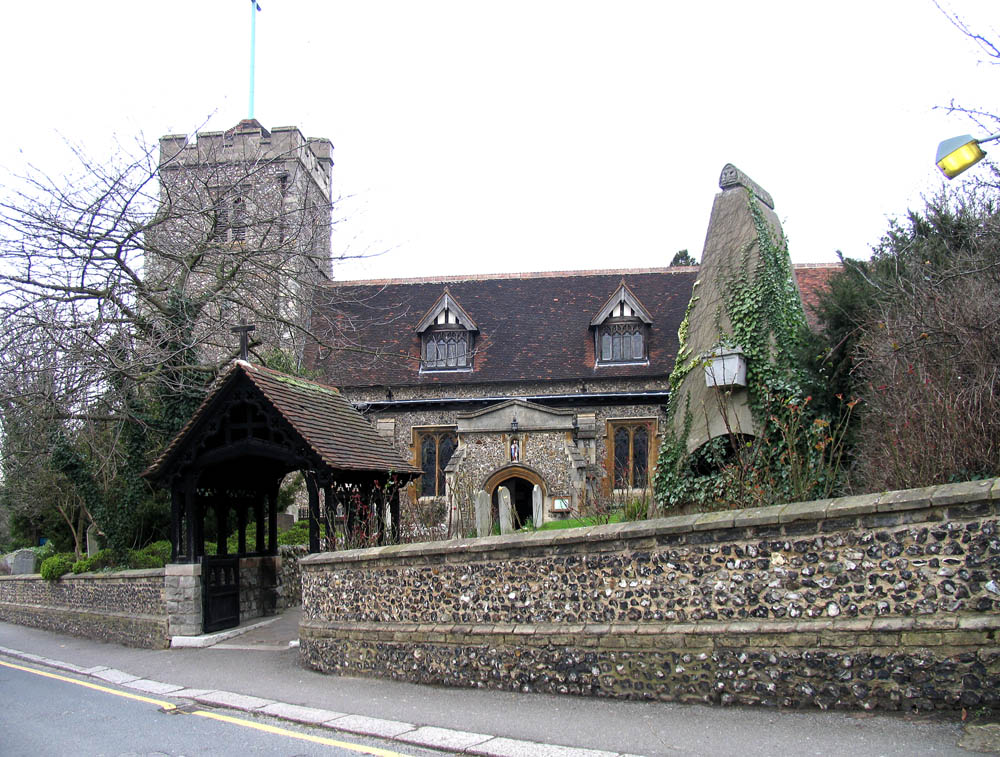
Raphson was probably baptised at St John the Baptist, Pinner in the 1660s.

Very little is known about Raphson's life. Connor and Robertson give his date of birth as 1668 based on a 1691 book review giving his age as 22; mathematical historian Florian Cajori preferred dates around 1648–1715. His parents were probably Ruth and James Raphson, in which case he is likely to be a Joseph Raphson baptised at St John the Baptist, Pinner, Middlesex in the 1660s.

Raphson was made a Fellow of the Royal Society on 30 November 1689, after being proposed for membership by Edmund Halley. In 1692 he graduated with an M.A. from Jesus College which at the time was primarily a training college for Church of England clergy, however as the degree was awarded Royal warrant he probably did not actually study there. He described himself as "of London" on his Royal Society bond form and from Middlesex on the Jesus College register.

Raphson's most notable work is Analysis Aequationum Universalis, which was published in 1690. It contains a method, now known as the Newton–Raphson method, for approximating the roots of an equation. Isaac Newton had developed a very similar formula in his Method of Fluxions, written in 1671, but this work would not be published until 1736, nearly 50 years after Raphson's Analysis. However, Raphson's version of the method is simpler than Newton's, and is therefore generally considered superior. For this reason, it is Raphson's version of the method, rather than Newton's, that is to be found in textbooks today.

Raphson was a staunch supporter of Newton's claim, and not that of Gottfried Leibniz, to be the sole inventor of calculus. In addition, Raphson translated Newton's Arithmetica Universalis into English.

Raphson coined the word pantheism, in his work De Spatio Reali, published in 1697, where it may have been found by John Toland, who called Raphson's work "ingenious". In De Spatio Reali, Raphson begins by making a distinction between atheistic panhylists (from the Greek pan 'all' and hyle 'wood, matter'), who believe everything derives from matter, and pantheists who believe in "a certain universal substance material as well as intelligent, that fashions all things that exist out of its own essence." Raphson further believed the universe to be immeasurable in respect to a human's capacity of understanding, and that humans would never be able to comprehend it.

A book by Raphson became a part of the long-running priority dispute on who invented calculus after his death. Newton apparently took control of the publication of Raphson's posthumous book Historia fluxionum and added a supplement with letters from Leibniz and Antonio Schinella Conti to support his position in the dispute.

The lack of sources about Raphson's life and background has been described as surprising. He may have been of Irish descent.
