= The Paradise Project =

US non-profit organization

- Logo

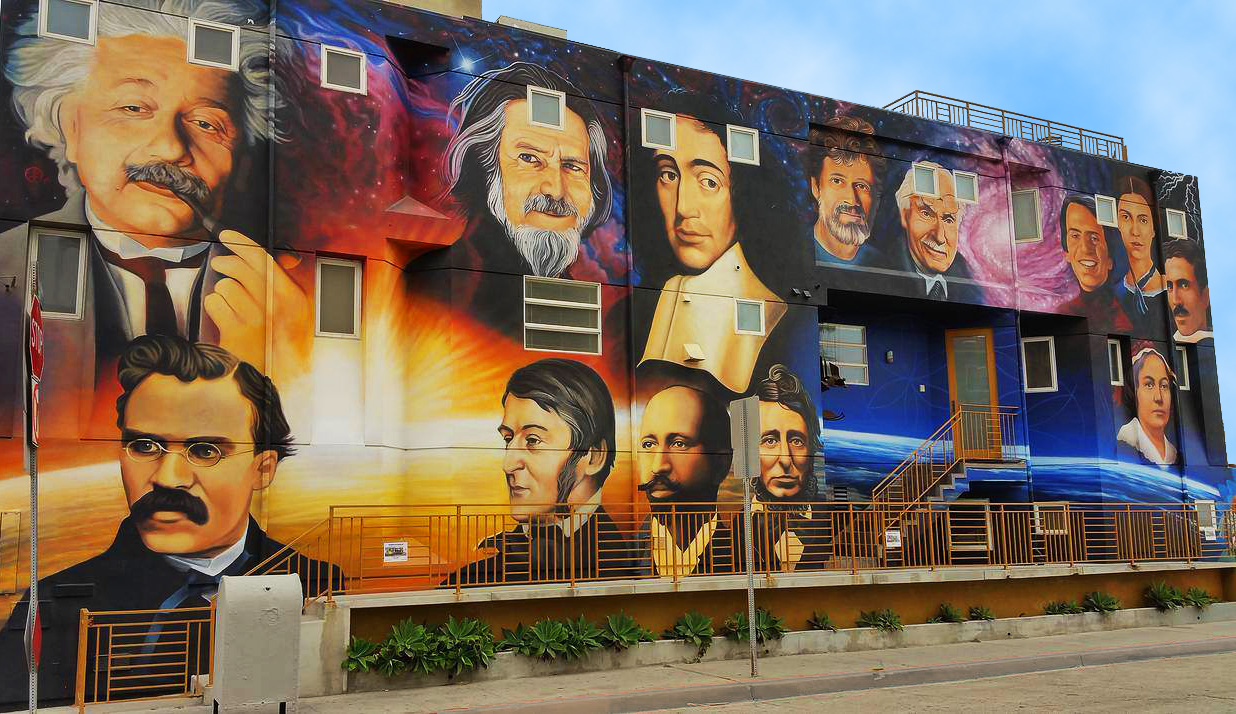
- Levi Ponce's mural Luminaries of Pantheism at The Paradise Project's headquarters in Venice, Los Angeles
- Formation: 2004; 22 years ago
- Website: theparadiseproject.org

The Paradise Project is a non-profit organization founded in 2004 that is "dedicated to celebrating and connecting diverse independent free thinkers who are deeply spiritual about science and nature."

The organization hosts pantheism.com and aims to spread awareness about pantheism through social media, meetings, meditation gatherings, and book borrowing programs. It hosts a Facebook fan page about pantheism with over 300,000 fans and group pages with over 15,000 members.

In 2015, Los Angeles muralist Levi Ponce was commissioned by the Project to paint the 75-foot long mural Luminaries of Pantheism for its headquarters in Venice, California.
