= Paul Harrison (pantheist) =

British writer

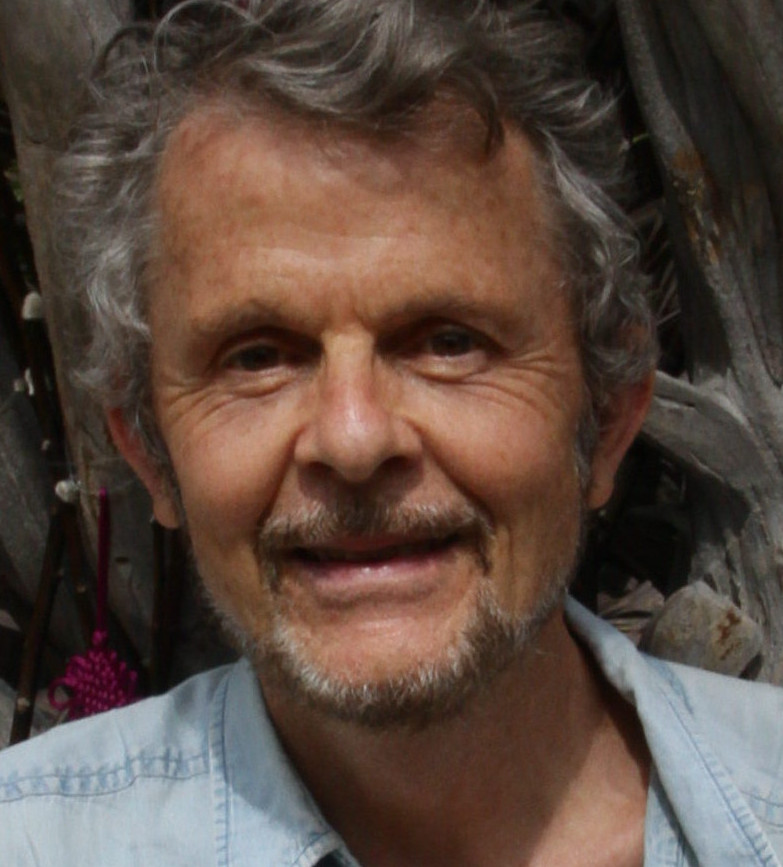
Paul Harrison at Gardens by the Sea in Singapore 2012

Paul Harrison (born 1945 in Oldham) is an environmental writer, author of books and reports on environment and development, and editor of major United Nations reports. He is the founder and president of the World Pantheist Movement.

For most of his life, Harrison has been a journalist and writer on the environment, Third-World development and poverty. His best known books are Inside the Third World (1979) (on world poverty) and The Third Revolution about world population and environment. Also The Greening of Africa (1987) about sustainable development for Africa, and Inside the Inner City (1992) about inner city poverty in East London. His book on pantheism, Elements of Pantheism, was published by Element Books in 1999.

Harrison has worked for six UN agencies and travelled to many Third-World countries in Asia, Africa and Latin America. In 1988 he received a UN Environment Programme (UNEP) Global 500 Roll of Honour award for his writings on environment. In 1988 he won a Global Media Award from the Population Institute. He edited the United Nations Population Fund's State of World Population, (1990 and 1992) and was editor-in-chief for the Independent Commission on Population and Quality of Life report Caring for the Future. He has edited flagship reports for the UN Food and Agriculture Organization (FAO), United Nations Population Fund (UNFPA) and United Nations Environment Programme (UNEP).

He was the lead author of the American Association for the Advancement of Science Atlas of Population and Environment. From 2005 to 2008 he edited the United Nations Environment Programme Yearbook (formerly Geo Yearbook).

Harrison was born in Oldham, Lancashire, England, and has master's degrees in European languages and literature (University of Cambridge 1963-66) and political sociology (London School of Economics 1967-8), and in 1995 a PhD from Cambridge in Earth Sciences and Geography.

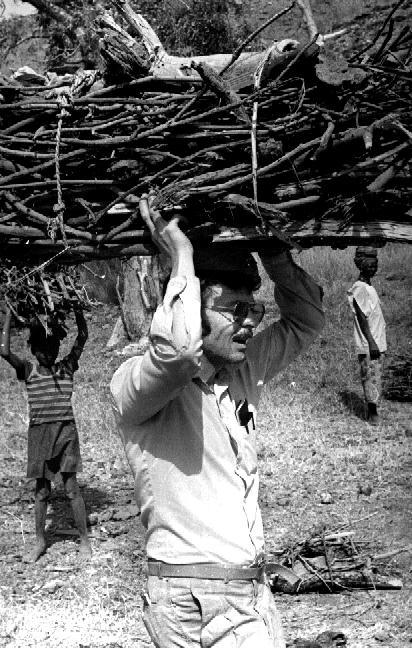
Paul Harrison testing the weight of a woman's firewood load in Burkina Faso 1989

In July 1996 he posted the first page of what became the scientific pantheism site, and in 1997 he started the mailing list that grew into the World Pantheist Movement.
