= Walter Wilson =

Walter Wilson may refer to:

== Sports ==
- Walter Wilson (cricketer) (1843–1865), New Zealand cricketer
- Walter Wilson (footballer, born 1865) (1865–?), English footballer for Everton
- Walter Wilson (footballer, fl. 1894), British 19th century footballer
- Walter Bartley Wilson (1870–1954), artist and football manager at Cardiff City
- Walter Wilson (baseball) (1913–1994), pitcher in Major League Baseball
- Walter Wilson (gridiron football) (born 1966), football player
- Walter Wilson (rugby union) (1885–1968), Australian-born British Army officer and England international rugby union player

== Other ==
- Walter Wilson (biographer) (1781–1847), English biographer of nonconformism
- Walter Horatio Wilson (1839–1902), lawyer and politician in the Legislative Assembly of Queensland
- Walter Henry Wilson (1839–1904), British ship designer and one of the founding partners of the firm Harland and Wolff
- William Gilmour Wilson, (1856–1943), British architect, designer of Thorpeness almshouses.
- Walter Gordon Wilson (1874–1957), engineer and member of the British Royal Naval Air Service
- Walter K. Wilson Jr. (1906–1985), US Army general
- Walter K. Wilson Sr. (1880–1954), US Army general
- Wally Wilson (born 1947), American record producer and songwriter

== See also ==
- Walter Willson (1876–1952), Irish-born businessman and banker in British India
