= Paraman =

Paraman is a surname. Notable people with the surname include:

- A. M. Paraman (1926–2018), Indian politician
- Ellen Mary Paraman (1826–1892), governess
