= Venetia Stanley-Smith =

British herbalist (1950–2023)

Venetia Stanley-Smith (27 December 1950 – 21 June 2023) was a British-born herbalist and essayist based in Ohara, Kyoto, Japan.

== Life ==
Stanley-Smith was born in London, England on 27 December 1950. Her father was George Derek Stanley-Smith, son of Colonel George Edward Stanley Smith. Her mother was Juliana Eveline Curzon, daughter of Richard Curzon, 2nd Viscount Scarsdale, whose uncle was George Curzon, 1st Marquess Curzon of Kedleston, Viceroy of India.

Stanley-Smith left England at the age of 19 as a backpacker, and after spending some time in India, settled in Japan aged 21. She married a Japanese man in 1974 and started an Eikaiwa school in Kyoto in 1978. She later divorced him and remarried Tadashi Kajiyama, a Japanese mountain photographer, in 1992, and moved with him to Ohara in 1996. She had two daughters and one son with her first husband and one son with her second husband.

Stanley-Smith became a prominent herbalist in Japan when she was awarded a prize in an NHK herb contest, leading her to write books and give lessons on growing herbs in Japan. Between 2009 and 2013, she was featured in an NHK television series, At Home with Venetia in Kyoto (Japanese: 猫のしっぽ カエルの手, lit. 'Cat's Tail and Frog's Hand').

Stanley-Smith died from aspiration pneumonia on 21 June 2023 in Kyoto, aged 72.

== Selected publications ==
- Venetia's Ohara Herb Diary
- Venetia's Kyoto Country Living
