= Alfred Curzon, 4th Baron Scarsdale =

British aristocrat and clergyman

Alfred Nathaniel Holden Curzon, 4th Baron Scarsdale, JP (12 July 1831 – 23 March 1916), was a British aristocrat and clergyman. He was the father of George Curzon, 1st Marquess Curzon of Kedleston, who was the Conservative Viceroy of India and British Foreign Secretary.

== Early life ==
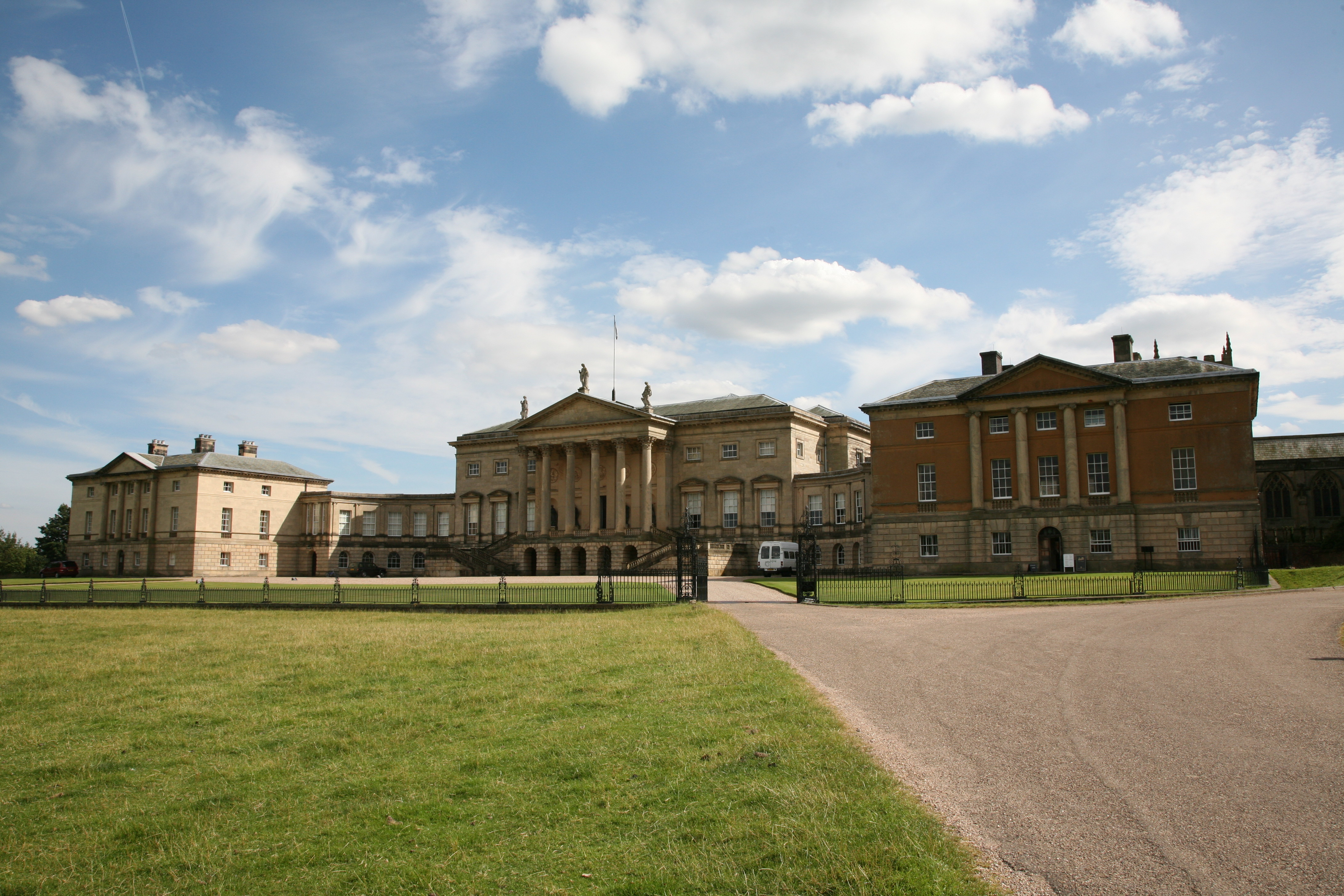
Kedleston Hall by Robert Adam, which was inherited by Alfred's son George

Alfred was born into an old family of clergy and priests. He was the second son of the Rev. Hon. Alfred Curzon, Rector of Kedleston (1801–1850), and the former Sophia Holden. His elder brother, George Nathaniel Curzon, died young from a riding accident in 1855. He had two sisters, Hon. Sophia Felicity Curzon (wife of W. Hatfield de Rodes, of Barlborough Hall) and Hon. Mary Catherine Curzon (wife of Arthur Hill-Trevor, 1st Baron Trevor).

His paternal grandfather was Nathaniel Curzon, 2nd Baron Scarsdale, and his maternal grandfather was Robert Holden of Nuthall Temple, Nottinghamshire.

Curzon was educated at Rugby School and at the University of Oxford.

== Career ==
He in 1856 succeeded his uncle to the title, and to 11,000 acres (about 4,450 hectares) of land. He was ordained into the Church of England and he subsequently became Rector of Kedleston for fifty-six years from 1856 to 1916, and a Justice of the Peace.

== Personal life ==
In 1856, he married Blanche Pocklington-Senhouse (1837–1875), second daughter of Joseph Pocklington-Senhouse, of Netherhall, and Elizabeth Senhouse (eldest daughter and co-heiress of Humphrey Senhouse). The marriage produced four sons and seven daughters, one of whom died in infancy, including:

- Hon. Sophia Caroline Curzon (1857–1929), who married Rev. Charles MacMichael, Rector of Walpole St Peter, in 1882.
- George Curzon, 1st Marquess Curzon of Kedleston (1859–1925), the Conservative Viceroy of India and British Foreign Secretary who married American heiress Mary Leiter, daughter of Levi Leiter.
- Hon. Alfred Nathaniel Curzon (1860–1920), who married Henrietta Mary Montagu, second daughter of Hon. Spencer Montagu (fourth son of Matthew Montagu, 4th Baron Rokeby), in 1891.Their son was Richard Nathaniel Curzon, 2nd Viscount Scarsdale.
- Hon. Blanche Felicia Curzon (1861–1928)
- Hon. Eveline Mary Curzon (1864–1934), who married Sir James Miller, 2nd Baronet, in 1893.
- Hon. Francis Nathaniel Curzon (1865–1941), who married Winifred Phyllis (née Combe) Dunville, former wife of Robert Lambart Dunville and daughter of Capt. Christian Combe and Lady Jane Seymour Conyngham (younger daughter of George Conyngham, 3rd Marquess Conyngham), in 1922. Their son was Francis John Nathaniel Curzon, 3rd Viscount Scarsdale.
- Hon. Assheton Nathaniel Curzon (1867–1950), who married Mercy Lilian Okeover, daughter of Haughton Charles Okeover and Hon. Eliza Anne Cavendish (eldest daughter of Henry Cavendish, 3rd Baron Waterpark), in 1897.
- Hon. Elinor Florence Curzon (1869–1939)
- Hon. Geraldine Emily Curzon (1871–1940), who married William Tower Townshend in 1901.
- Hon. Margaret Georgina Curzon (1873–1957), who married Hardress John Waller, son of Bolton J. Waller, in 1899.

Lord Scarsdale died on 23 March 1916 and was succeeded in the barony by his eldest son, George.

Peerage of Great Britain
Preceded by Nathaniel Curzon	Baron Scarsdale; 1856–1916	Succeeded by George Curzon
