= Francis Curzon, 3rd Viscount Scarsdale =

British peer (1924–2000)

The Right Honourable The Viscount Scarsdale

Member of the House of Lords
- Lord Temporal
- In office 19 October 1977 – 11 November 1999
- Preceded by: The 2nd Viscount Scarsdale
- Succeeded by: Seat abolished (Note: Under the House of Lords Act 1999.)

Personal details
- Born: Francis John Nathaniel Curzon; 28 July 1924
- Died: 2 August 2000 (aged 76)
- Other titles: 7th Baron Scarsdale; 11th Baronet (of Kedleston)

Francis John Nathaniel Curzon, 3rd Viscount Scarsdale (28 July 1924 – 2 August 2000), was a British hereditary peer and member of the House of Lords.

== Family ==
He was a younger son of the Hon. Francis Nathaniel Curzon (son of Alfred Curzon, 4th Baron Scarsdale) and Winifred Phyllis Combe.

Curzon married Solange Yvonne Palmyre Ghislaine Hanse on 3 July 1948. They divorced in 1967; she died on 4 July 1974. They had four children:

- Peter Curzon, 4th Viscount Scarsdale, born 6 March 1949
- John Daniel Curzon, born 15 January 1952, died 24 January 1952
- Hon. Annette Yvonne Curzon, born 28 October 1953
- Hon. David James Nathaniel Curzon, born 3 February 1958

His second wife was Helene Gladys Frances Thomson, married on 5 June 1968. They had two children:

- Hon. Richard Francis Nathaniel Curzon, born 30 January 1969
- Hon. James Fergus Nathaniel Curzon, born 12 September 1970

== Notes ==
Peerage of the United Kingdom
Preceded by Richard Curzon	Viscount Scarsdale; 1977–2000; Member of the House of Lords (1977–1999)	Succeeded by Peter Curzon
Preceded by Richard Curzon	Baron Scarsdale; 1977–2000	Succeeded by Peter Curzon
Baronetage of Nova Scotia
Preceded by Richard Curzon	Baronet of Kedleston; 1977–2000	Succeeded by Peter Curzon
Baronetage of England
Preceded by Richard Curzon	Baronet of Kedleston; 1977–2000	Succeeded by Peter Curzon
