= War Policy Committee =

Group of British ministers

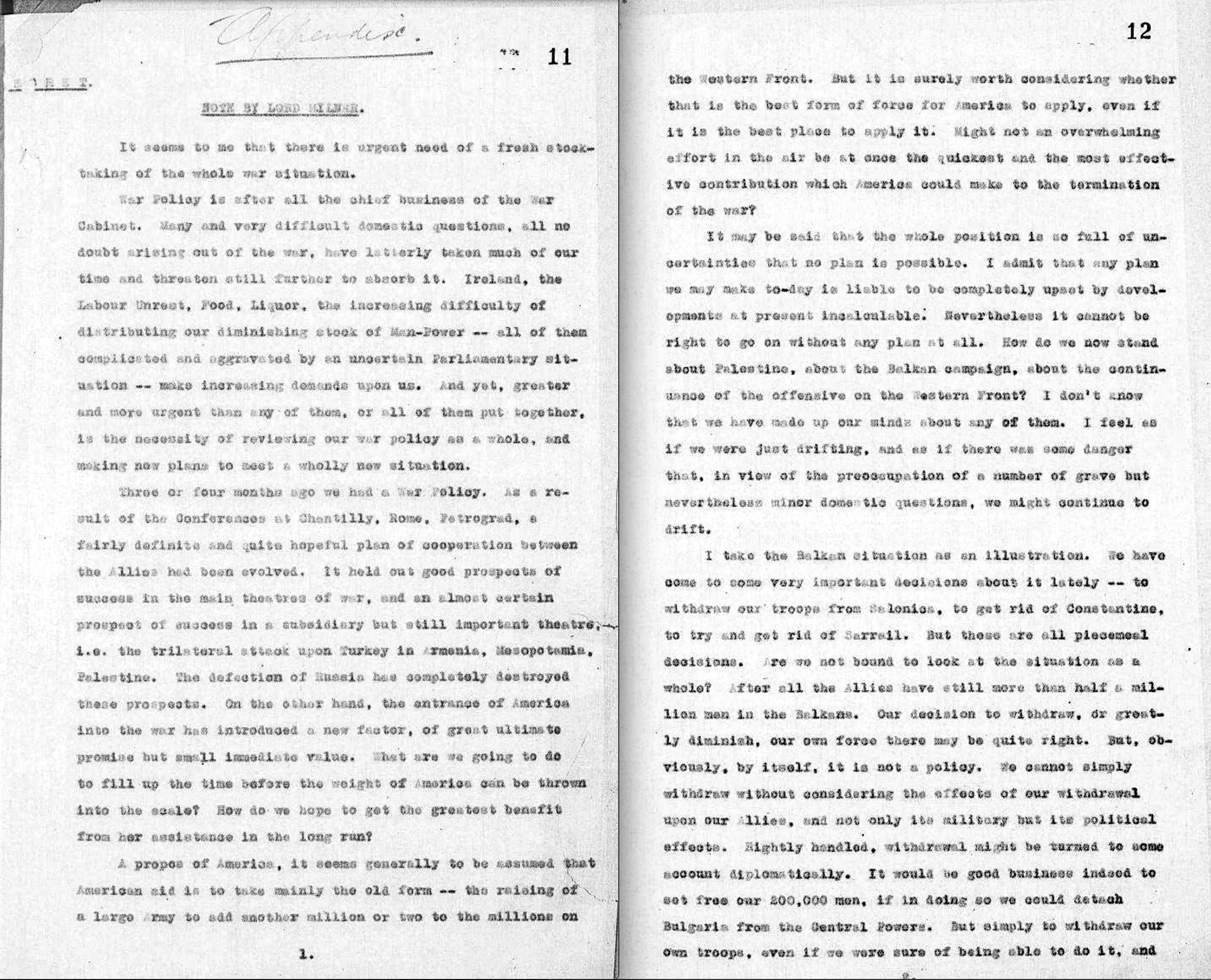
War policy committee, pgs. 1 & 2 (from the UK National Archives)

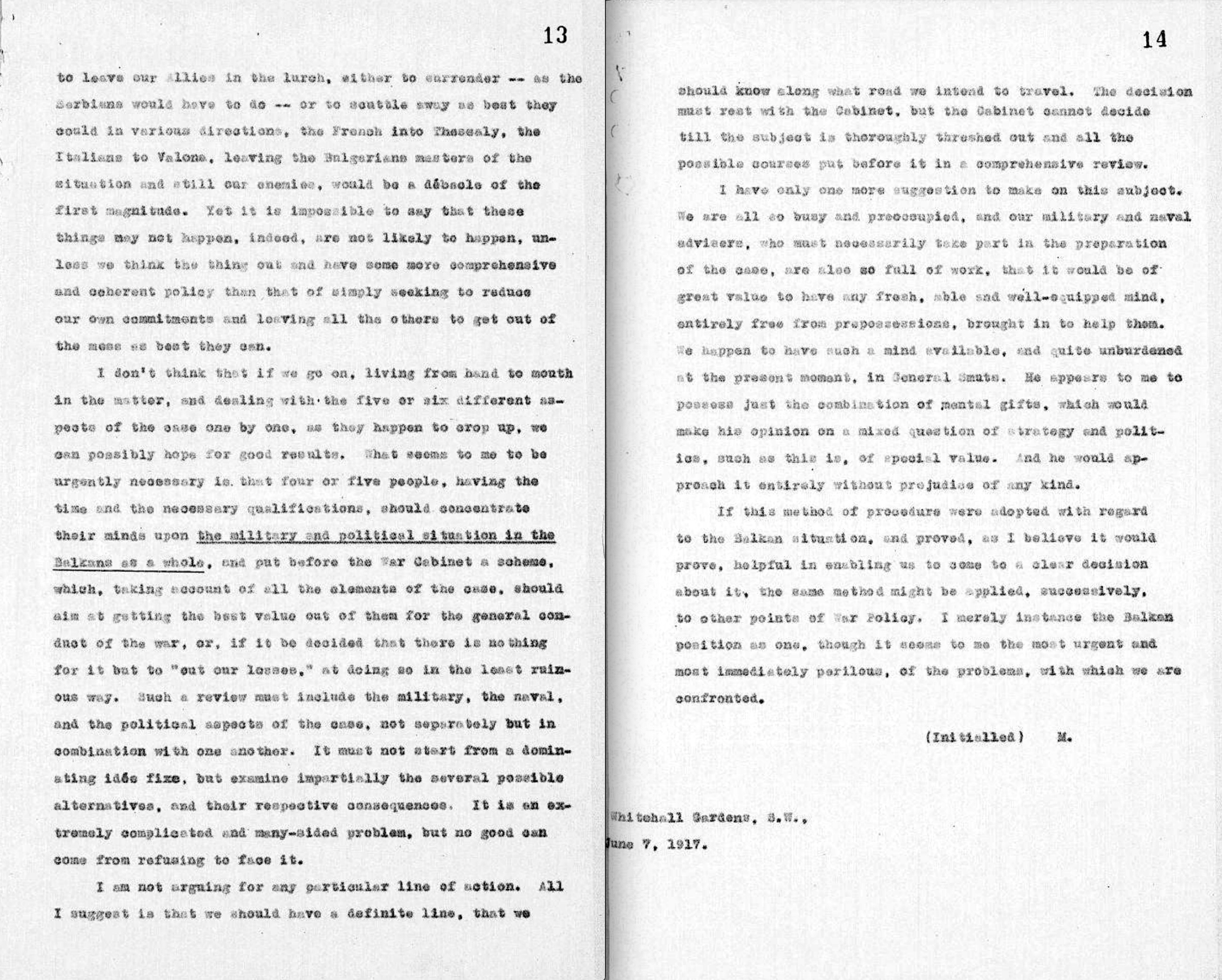
War policy committee, pgs. 3 & 4

The War Policy Committee was a small group of British ministers, most of them members of the War Cabinet, set up during World War I to decide war strategy. The committee was created at the request of Lord Milner on June 7, 1917, through a memorandum he circulated with his peers on the British War Cabinet. Its members included the Prime Minister, David Lloyd George, Lord Milner, Edward Carson, Lord Curzon and Jan Smuts. The committee was formed to discuss the strategic matter of the Russian Revolution (the possibility of ally Russia, now a democracy after the deposition of Nicholas II of Russia, being knocked out of the war), and the new entry of The United States. Coincidentally or not, the timing of Lord Milner's memo coincided with the detonation of 19 underground mines filled with explosives on the Western Front, which created the largest human explosion of all time. The night before this explosion, General Harington said to reporters "Gentleman, I don't know whether we are going to make history tomorrow, but at any rate we shall change the geography". In Milner's memo, he stressed that the allies must act together for the common good, and not devolve to piecemeal arrangements that satisfied specific countries. The War Policy Committee was formed, and it discussed every major initiative taken by the allies until the end of the war. It was chaired by Lord's Milner and Curzon, with Jan Smuts as its Vice Chairman.

The first item on the War Policy Committee's agenda was Field Marshal Douglas Haig's idea for a summer offensive to relieve allied shipping of the U-Boat menace in the English Channel by attacking Belgium and along the Channel coast to get rid of U-Boat pens. The idea was initially rejected by Lloyd George and Milner because of the huge losses incurred the previous year at the Battle of the Somme. However, it had the support of Smuts, Carson and tentatively Curzon. Another factor was Bonar Law, who, although not part of the committee, was close to Lloyd George and supported the measure. With an understanding that the battle would be stopped at a moment's notice if things went wrong, the Flanders Offensive was approved. It proved to be a morass.

On August 10, the War Policy Committee presented its report on war strategy. It concluded that:

1. Not much help can be expect from Russia.
2. The French armies were in a state of exhaustion.
3. Reports of lowered German morale in the latest battle were not true.
4. Naval offensive operations must be studied, and the convoy system must improve.
5. Heavy casualties in the present battle can't be replaced indefinitely, and the war can't be sustained at its present level of strength through 1918.
6. It advocated an offence against Austria, through Italy, as a way of engaging the Italians and of attacking the enemy where he was weakest, not strongest.

The Flanders Offensive, which started July 31, 1917, ended on November 10, 1917, and proved impossible to stop due to over optimistic predictions of the generals. One of these was Haig himself, and another was Brigadier-General John Charteris, Haig's intelligence chief, who was replaced in January 1918. By the time of the German Spring Offensive on March 21, 1918, five of Haig's closest generals were replaced.

The Italian loss at the Battle of Caporetto in November 1917 forced the idea of a Supreme War Council to coordinate all allied activities against the Central Powers, and resulted in the war plan for 1918.

Other matters considered by the committee were Lord Curzon's plan for a "Monroe Doctrine for Africa" and Winston Churchill's recommendations for the production of tanks in 1918.
