= Richard Curzon, 2nd Viscount Scarsdale =

English peer and landowner (1898–1977)

The Right Honourable The Viscount Scarsdale CStJ TD
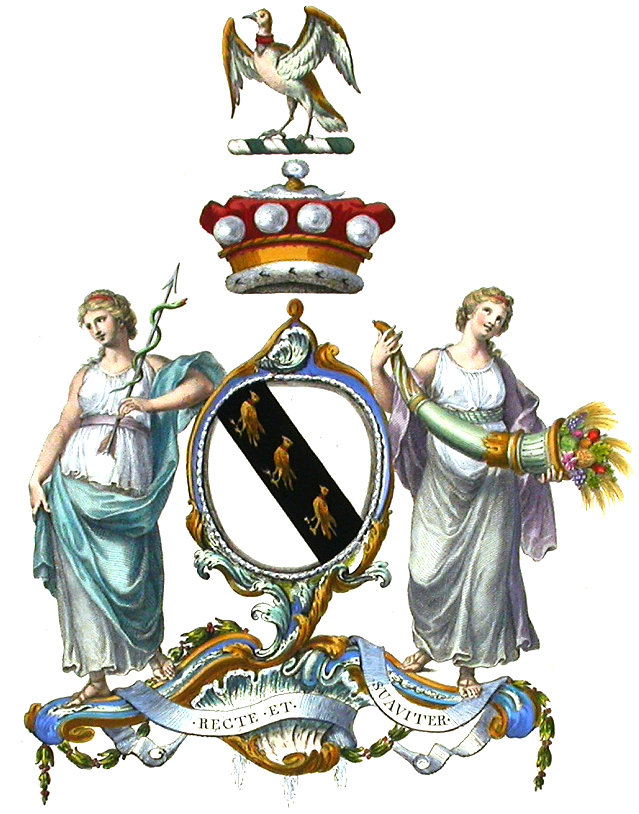
- Arms

Member of the House of Lords
- Lord Temporal
- In office 20 March 1925 – 19 October 1977
- Preceded by: The 1st Marquess Curzon of Kedleston
- Succeeded by: The 3rd Viscount Scarsdale

Personal details
- Born: Richard Nathaniel Curzon; 3 July 1898
- Died: 19 October 1977 (aged 79)
- Occupation: Peer, landowner

Richard Nathaniel Curzon, 2nd Viscount Scarsdale (3 July 1898 – 19 October 1977), was an English peer and landowner, a member of the House of Lords for more than fifty years.

== Life ==
Curzon was the only son of Colonel Alfred Nathaniel Curzon, by his marriage to Henrietta Mary Montagu. He was also a nephew of George Curzon, 1st Marquess Curzon of Kedleston, head of the family.

The young Curzon was educated at Eton and the Royal Military College, Sandhurst, commissioned into the Royal Scots Greys, and saw active service in the final months of the First World War, in France and Belgium, then after the Armistice of November 1918 in Germany, Egypt, Syria, and Palestine. In 1923, he was appointed as Honorary Attaché to the British embassy in Rome.

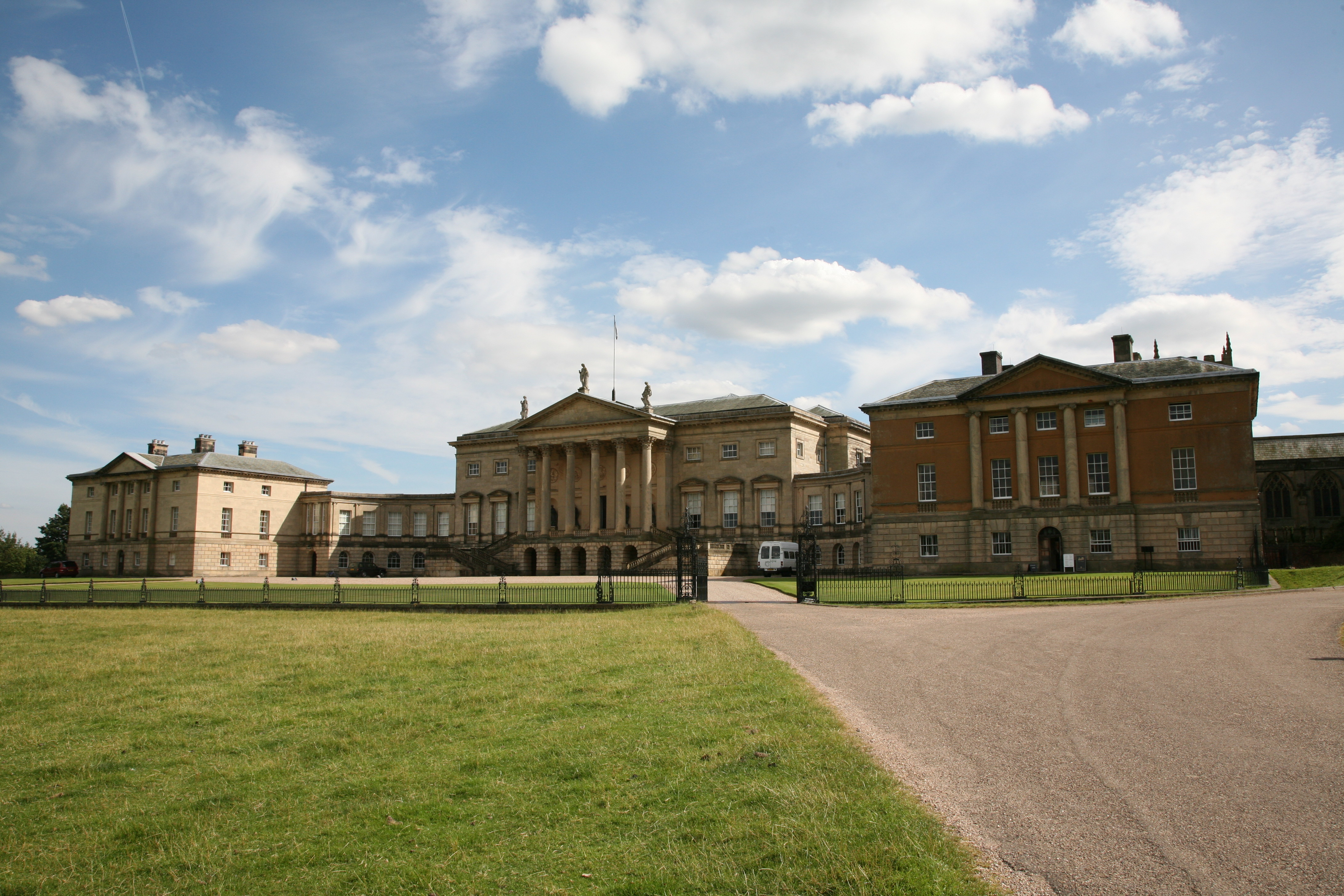
Kedleston Hall

His uncle's marriage had produced only three daughters, and he was widowed in 1906, leaving Curzon's father as the heir presumptive to the family estates based on Kedleston Hall in Derbyshire and the peerage of Baron Scarsdale. His uncle was also given other peerages, and in 1911 was created Viscount Scarsdale, with a special remainder to his father and his father's heirs male. In 1917, Marquess Curzon, by now in his late fifties, married secondly Grace Duggan, a rich young widow, hoping for a son and heir, but it was not to be. Curzon's father died in 1920, leaving him as the heir presumptive, and on the death of Marquess Curzon in 1925, Richard Curzon became head of the Curzon family. His inheritance included Kedleston Hall, the baronetcies created for his ancestor Sir John Curzon (1598–1686), and the new title of Viscount Scarsdale.

On 14 April 1923, Curzon married firstly Mildred Carson Dunbar, a daughter of William Roland Dunbar. They had four daughters and were divorced in 1946. On 10 August of that year he married secondly Ottilie Margarete Julie Pretzlik, daughter of Charles Pretzlik and Ottilie Hennig, but had no further children. His daughters were:

- Hon. Anne Mildred Curzon (born 1923), who in 1942 married Major W. J. L. Willson, son of Sir Walter Willson, and had two sons and a daughter.
- Hon. Gloria Mary Curzon (1927–1979), who in 1951 married J. G. Bearman and had two sons.
- Hon. Juliana Eveline Curzon (1928–2006), who in 1948 married firstly G. D. S. Smith, and had two daughters and a son before they were divorced, including Venetia Stanley-Smith. She was later married to Frederick Nettleford (1953–1956), Sir Dudley Cunliffe-Owen (1956–1962) and John Roberts (1962–1972).
- Hon. Diana Geraldine Curzon (1934–2013)

Scarsdale returned to the army in the Second World War, as a Captain in the Derbyshire Yeomanry, and was awarded the Territorial Decoration. He was also appointed Commander of the Most Venerable Order of the Hospital of St John of Jerusalem.

Lord Scarsdale died in 1977, and was succeeded by a first cousin, Francis Curzon.

== Notes ==
Peerage of the United Kingdom
Preceded by George Curzon	Viscount Scarsdale; 1925–1977; Member of the House of Lords (1925–1977)	Succeeded by Francis Curzon
Preceded by George Curzon	Baron Scarsdale; 1925–1977	Succeeded by Francis Curzon
Baronetage of Nova Scotia
Preceded by George Curzon	Baronet of Kedleston; 1925–1977	Succeeded by Francis Curzon
Baronetage of England
Preceded by George Curzon	Baronet of Kedleston; 1925–1977	Succeeded by Francis Curzon
