= Walter Willson =

Early C20 businessman and legislator in British India

Sir Walter Stuart James Willson (16 November 1876 – 16 April 1952) was an Dublin-born business man and banker in British India who became a member of the Legislative Assembly of India.

He retired to England, but maintained close links with India until his death in 1952.

== Life ==
Willson was the eldest surviving son of Albert Willson (1843–1922), of Waldegrave Park, Twickenham, by his marriage to Mary Elizabeth (1852- 1919), a daughter of William Latimer CE, of Drogheda, Ireland. He was educated at St Paul's School.

In 1921, Willson was a director of Turner Morrison, & Co., Ltd. and a member of the Calcutta Municipal Corporation. In 1924, he was appointed to the Legislative Assembly of India, as a Nominated Non-Official representing Commerce, and served until 1928.

On 3 July 1926, it was announced that Willson was to be knighted, and this was carried out by Lord Irwin, Viceroy of India, at Viceregal Lodge, Delhi, on 18 January 1927.

In 1928, he presented a portrait by Tilly Kettle of Elijah Impey, First Chief Justice of the Supreme Court at Fort William, to the Victoria Memorial Hall, Calcutta.

He was later a director of the Imperial Bank of India.

Willson had houses at 2, Hastings Park Road, Alipore, Calcutta, Bengal, and Kenward, Tonbridge, Kent, and was a member of the Oriental Club, the Ranelagh Club, the Royal Bombay Yacht Club, and the Royal Calcutta Turf Club.

In October 1921, Willson received a grant of arms, blazoned “Sable, in the dexter canton a sun, issuant therefrom seven rays or, upon the sun an albatross wings elevated proper. Crest — On a wreath of the colours, upon a cannon sable, an albatross as in the arms. Badge — A portcullis chained, surmounted by a sun in splendour or.”

After retiring to Kent, Willson was a member of the Tunbridge Wells Corporation from 1932 to 1935.

== Personal life ==
In 1919, Willson married Ethel Winifred (1894 - 1961), a daughter of John James Morris (1858 - 1919) and Eliza Ann Boyes (1868 -1928), and they had two sons, Walter James Latimer (1921- 1994) and Cornelius William Latimer (1936 - 2020) and three daughters, Winifred Latimer (1920 -2007), Rachel Mary Latimer (1923- 2011), and Margaret Naomi Latimer (1925 - 2020). In 1942 their son, by then Major W. J. L. Willson of the Grenadier Guards, married Anne Mildred Curzon (born 1923), one of the daughters of Richard Curzon, 2nd Viscount Scarsdale, and they had two sons and a daughter. In 1943, their daughter Rachel Mary married Mervyn Christopher Thursby-Pelham, a young Welsh Guards officer who was later a brigadier. They had a son and a daughter.

Willson died on 16 April 1952 at a nursing home in Tonbridge, leaving an estate valued for probate at £140,035, equivalent to £3,508,115 in 2025.
