= Ellen Mary Paraman =

Governess to George Curzon

Ellen Mary Paraman (1826-1892) was the governess to George Curzon, the subsequent Viceroy of India, between 1866 and 1869. She has been described as having greater involvement in Curzon's upbringing than either of his parents, before his enrolment in school, affecting his future attitude toward women and his desire for control. According to Curzon's later writings, Paraman employed cruel disciplinary techniques. In addition to employing corporal punishment and locking him up, she shamed him in various ways, including forcing him to sew and wear a bright red petticoat to which were attached insults such as "liar", "sneak", or "coward".

== Family ==
Ellen Mary Paraman was the daughter of Robert Paraman, the governor of Norwich City Gaol. She had four sisters and one brother.
