= George Curzon, 1st Marquess Curzon of Kedleston =

Viceroy of India from 1899 to 1905

The Most Honourable The Marquess Curzon of Kedleston KG GCSI GCIE PC FRS FRGS FBA
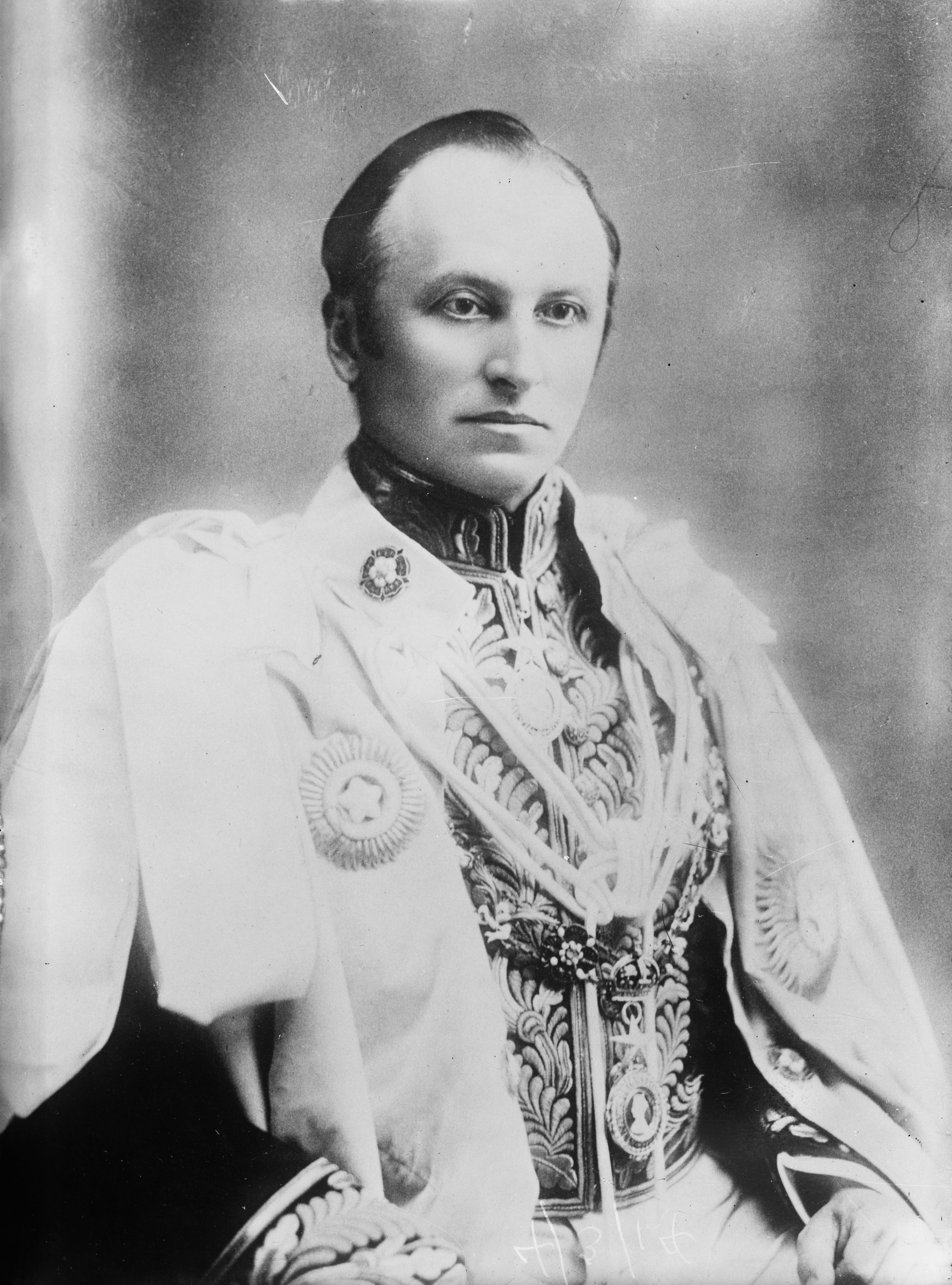
- Curzon, c. 1899-1905

Viceroy and Governor-General of India
- In office 6 January 1899 – 18 November 1905
- Monarchs: Victoria; Edward VII
- Deputy: Lord Ampthill
- Preceded by: The Earl of Elgin
- Succeeded by: The Earl of Minto

Leader of the House of Lords
- In office 3 November 1924 – 20 March 1925
- Monarch: George V
- Prime Minister: Stanley Baldwin
- Preceded by: The Viscount Haldane
- Succeeded by: The Marquess of Salisbury
- In office 10 December 1916 – 22 January 1924
- Monarch: George V
- Prime Minister: David Lloyd George; Bonar Law; Stanley Baldwin
- Preceded by: The Marquess of Crewe
- Succeeded by: The Viscount Haldane

Secretary of State for Foreign Affairs
- In office 23 October 1919 – 22 January 1924
- Monarch: George V
- Prime Minister: David Lloyd George; Bonar Law; Stanley Baldwin
- Preceded by: Arthur Balfour
- Succeeded by: Ramsay MacDonald

Lord President of the Council
- In office 3 November 1924 – 20 March 1925
- Monarch: George V
- Prime Minister: Stanley Baldwin
- Preceded by: Lord Parmoor
- Succeeded by: Arthur Balfour
- In office 10 December 1916 – 23 October 1919
- Monarch: George V
- Prime Minister: David Lloyd George
- Preceded by: The Marquess of Crewe
- Succeeded by: Arthur Balfour

President of the Air Board
- In office 15 May 1916 – 3 January 1917
- Monarch: George V
- Prime Minister: H. H. Asquith; David Lloyd George
- Preceded by: The Earl of Derby
- Succeeded by: The Viscount Cowdray

Parliamentary Under-Secretary of State for Foreign Affairs
- In office 20 June 1895 – 15 October 1898
- Monarch: Victoria
- Prime Minister: The Marquess of Salisbury
- Preceded by: Sir Edward Grey
- Succeeded by: St John Brodrick

Parliamentary Under-Secretary of State for India
- In office 9 November 1891 – 11 August 1892
- Monarch: Victoria
- Prime Minister: The Marquess of Salisbury
- Preceded by: Sir John Eldon Gorst
- Succeeded by: George W. E. Russell

Member of the House of Lords
- Lord Temporal
- as an Irish representative peer 21 January 1908 – 20 March 1925
- Preceded by: Lord Kilmaine
- Succeeded by: The Baroness Ravensdale (in barony); The Viscount Scarsdale (in viscountcy); No successor (as Irish representative peer)

Member of Parliament for Southport
- In office 27 July 1886 – 24 August 1898
- Preceded by: George Augustus Pilkington
- Succeeded by: Herbert Naylor-Leyland

Personal details
- Born: George Nathaniel Curzon; 11 January 1859 Kedleston, Derbyshire, England
- Died: 20 March 1925 (aged 66) London, England
- Party: Conservative
- Spouses: Mary Leiter (m. 1895; died 1906) Grace Duggan (m. 1917)
- Children: Irene Curzon, 2nd Baroness Ravensdale; Lady Cynthia Mosley; Lady Alexandra Metcalfe
- Parent(s): Alfred Curzon, 4th Baron Scarsdale; Blanche née Pocklington-Senhouse
- Education: Balliol College, Oxford

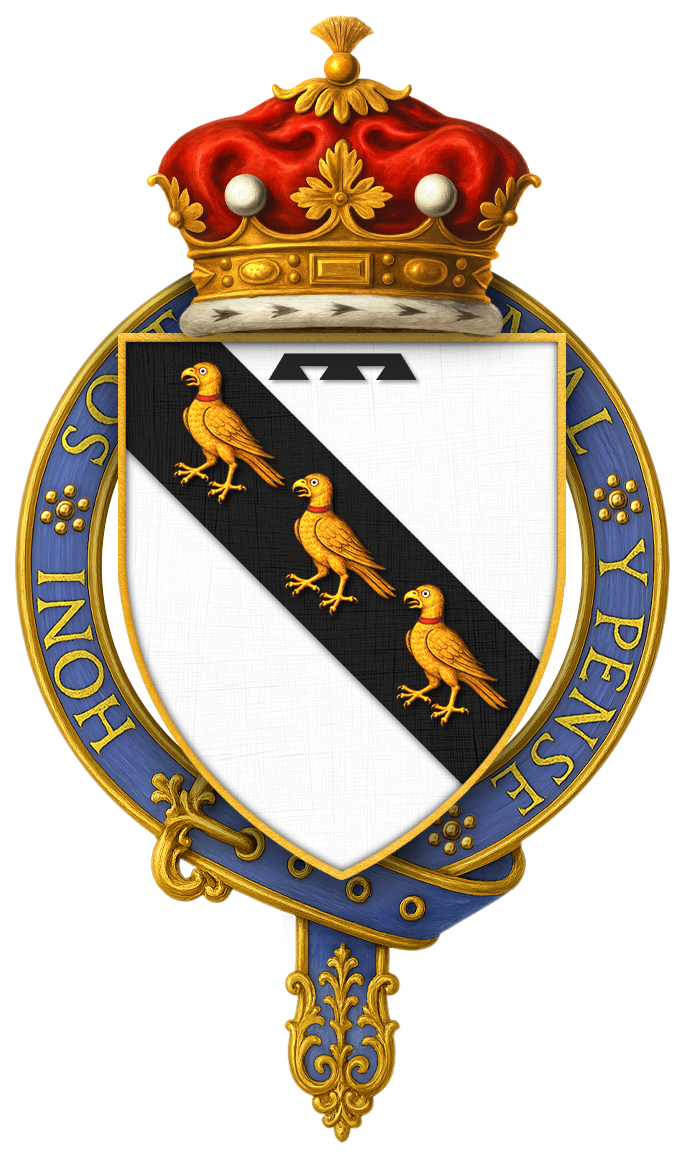
Garter-encircled arms of George Curzon, 1st Marquess Curzon of Kedleston, KG, GCSI, GCIE, PC, FBA

George Nathaniel Curzon, 1st Marquess Curzon of Kedleston (11 January 1859 – 20 March 1925), known as Lord Curzon (/ˈkɜːrzən/), was a British statesman, Conservative politician, explorer and writer who served as Viceroy of India from 1899 to 1905 and Foreign Secretary from 1919 to 1924.

Curzon was born in Derbyshire into an aristocratic family and educated at Eton College and Balliol College, Oxford, before entering Parliament in 1885. In the following years, he travelled extensively in Russia, Central Asia and the Far East, and published several books on the region in which he detailed his geopolitical outlook and underlined the perceived Russian threat to British control of India. In 1891, Curzon was named Under-Secretary of State for India, and in 1899 he was appointed Viceroy of India. During his tenure, he pursued a number of reforms of the British administration, attempted to address the British maltreatment of Indians, undertook the restoration of the Taj Mahal, and sent a British expedition to Tibet to counter Russian ambitions. In 1905, he presided over the partition of Bengal and came into conflict with Lord Kitchener over issues of military organisation. Unable to secure the backing of the government in London, he resigned later that year and returned to England.

In 1907, Curzon became Chancellor of Oxford University, and the following year he was elected to the House of Lords as an Irish representative peer. During the First World War, he served in H. H. Asquith's coalition cabinet as Lord Privy Seal, and from late 1916 he was Leader of the House of Lords and served in the war cabinet of Prime Minister David Lloyd George and the War Policy Committee. He was appointed Secretary of State for Foreign Affairs in October 1919 and lent his name to Britain's proposed Soviet-Polish boundary, the Curzon Line. He also oversaw the division of the British Mandate of Palestine and the creation of the Emirate of Transjordan, and was the chief Allied negotiator of the 1922 Treaty of Lausanne which defined the borders of modern Turkey. In 1921, he was created a marquess. On Bonar Law's retirement as prime minister in 1923, Curzon was a contender for the office but was passed over in favour of Stanley Baldwin. He remained as foreign secretary until 1924 when the Baldwin government fell, and died a year later at the age of 66.

== Early life ==
Curzon was the eldest son and the second of the eleven children of Alfred Curzon, 4th Baron Scarsdale (1831–1916), who was the rector of Kedleston in Derbyshire. George's mother was Blanche (1837–1875), the daughter of Joseph Pocklington-Senhouse of Netherhall in Cumberland. He was born at Kedleston Hall, built on the site where his family, who were clergymen and priests, had lived since the 12th century. His mother, exhausted by childbirth, died when George was 16; her husband survived her by 41 years. Neither parent exerted a major influence on Curzon's life. Scarsdale was an austere and unindulgent father who believed that landowners should stay on their land and not indefinitely tour the world for pleasure. He disapproved of the journeys across Asia between 1887 and 1895 which made his son one of the most travelled men to be a member of any British cabinet. An influential presence in Curzon's childhood was that of his brutal, sadistic governess, Ellen Mary Paraman, whose tyranny in the nursery stimulated his combative qualities and encouraged the obsessional side of his nature. Paraman used to beat him and periodically forced him to parade through the village wearing a conical hat bearing the words liar, sneak, and coward. Curzon later noted, "No children well born and well-placed ever cried so much and so justly."

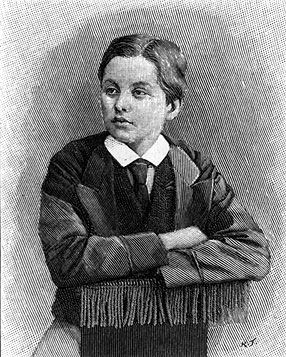
Curzon at Eton, 1870s

He was educated at Wixenford School, Eton College, where he became the captain of the Oppidans, and Balliol College, Oxford. His over-intimate relationship at Eton College with Oscar Browning led to the latter's dismissal. A spinal injury incurred while riding during his adolescence was a lifelong impediment to Curzon that required him to wear a metal corset for the remainder of his life.

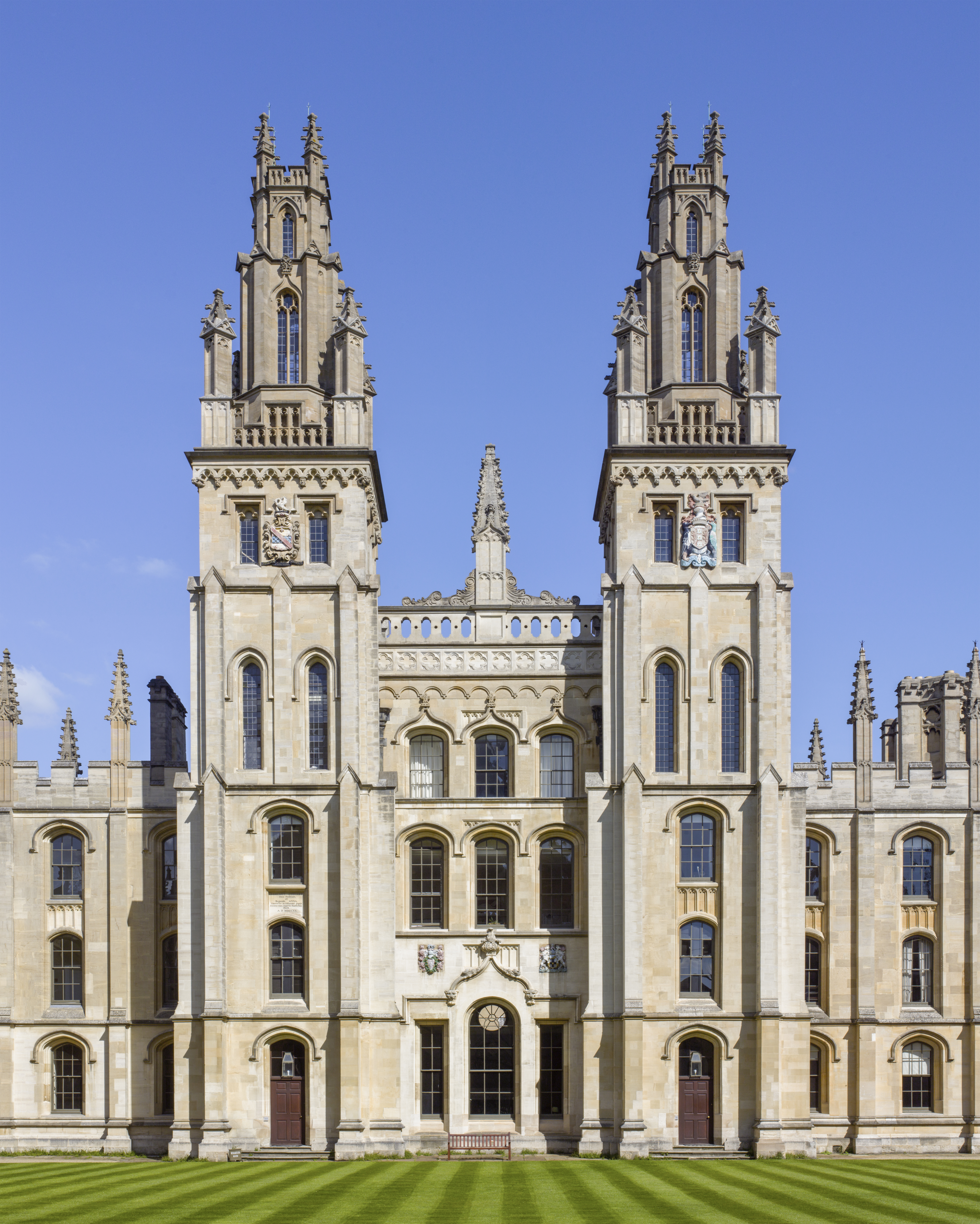
Curzon was educated at Balliol College, Oxford, and was later a Prize Fellow of All Souls College, Oxford

Curzon was President of the Union and Secretary of the Oxford Canning Club (a Tory political club named after George Canning), but as a consequence of the extent of his time-expenditure on political and social societies, he failed to achieve a first class degree in Greats, although he subsequently won both the Lothian Prize Essay and the Arnold Prize, the latter for an essay on Sir Thomas More, about whom he knew little. In 1883, Curzon received the most prestigious fellowship at the university, a Prize Fellowship at All Souls College. While at Eton and at Oxford, Curzon was a contemporary and close friend of Cecil Spring Rice and Edward Grey. Spring Rice contributed, alongside John William Mackail, to the composition of a famous sardonic doggerel about Curzon that was published as part of The Balliol Masque, about which Curzon wrote in later life "never has more harm been done to one single individual than that accursed doggerel has done to me." It read:

My name is George Nathaniel Curzon,
I am a most superior person.
My cheek is pink, my hair is sleek,
I dine at Blenheim once a week.

When Spring Rice was assigned to the British Embassy to the United States in 1894–1895, he was suspected by Curzon of trying to prevent Curzon's engagement to the American Mary Leiter, whom Curzon nevertheless married. Spring Rice assumed for a certainty, like many of Curzon's other friends, that Curzon would inevitably become Foreign Secretary: he wrote to Curzon in 1891, 'When you are Secretary of State for Foreign Affairs I hope you will restore the vanished glory of England, lead the European concert, decide the fate of nations, and give me three months' leave instead of two'.

Old texts state that he spent few months in a cottage in Dehradun, India. Though exact records are not available there is a road named after him there (probably near his erstwhile cottage).

== Early political career ==
In his youth, Curzon regularly attended debates at the House of Commons. Curzon became Assistant Private Secretary to the Marquess of Salisbury in 1885, and in 1886 entered Parliament as Member for Southport in south-west Lancashire. The press reaction to his maiden speech, was mainly favourable. The Times called it 'brilliant' while other newspapers described it as 'capital' and a 'decided success', and the St James' Gazette deemed it 'very successful' though 'unnecessarily flippant in tone'. Subsequent performances in the Commons, often dealing with Ireland or reform of the House of Lords (which he supported), received similar verdicts. He was Under-Secretary of State for India in 1891–1892 and Under-Secretary of State for Foreign Affairs in 1895–1898.

== Asian travels and writings ==
In the meantime Curzon had travelled around the world: Russia and Central Asia (1888–1889); Persia (September 1889 – January 1890); Siam, French Indochina, China, Korea and Japan (1892); and a daring foray into Afghanistan and the Pamirs (1894–1895). He published several books describing central and eastern Asia and related foreign policy issues. A bold and compulsive traveller, driven by orientalism, he was awarded the Patron's Medal of the Royal Geographical Society for his exploration of the source of the Amu Darya (Oxus). His journeys allowed him to study the problems of Asia and their implications for British India, while reinforcing his pride in his nation and her imperial mission.

Curzon believed Russia to be the most likely threat to British India, Britain's most valuable possession, from the 19th century through the early 20th century. In 1879 Russia had begun construction of the Transcaspian Railway along the Silk Road, officially solely to enforce local control. The line starts from the city of Kyzyl-Su, formerly Krasnovodsk (nowadays Turkmenbashi) (on the Caspian Sea), travels southeast along the Karakum Desert, through Ashgabat, continues along the Kopet Dagh Mountains until it reaches Tejen. Curzon dedicated an entire chapter in his book Russia in Central Asia to discussing the perceived threat to British control of India. This railway connected Russia with the most wealthy and influential cities in Central Asia at the time, including the Persian Khorasan Province, and would allow the rapid deployment of Russian supplies and troops into the area. Curzon also believed that the resulting greater economic interdependence between Russia and Central Asia would be damaging to British interests.

Persia and the Persian Question, written in 1892, has been considered Curzon's magnum opus and can be seen as a sequel to Russia in Central Asia. Curzon was commissioned by The Times to write several articles on the Persian political environment, but while there he decided to write a book on the country as whole. This two-volume work covers Persia's history and governmental structure, as well as graphics, maps and pictures (some taken by Curzon himself). Curzon was aided by General Albert Houtum-Schindler and the Royal Geographical Society (RGS), both of which helped him gain access to material to which as a foreigner he would not have been entitled to have access. General Schindler provided Curzon with information regarding Persia's geography and resources, as well as serving as an unofficial editor.

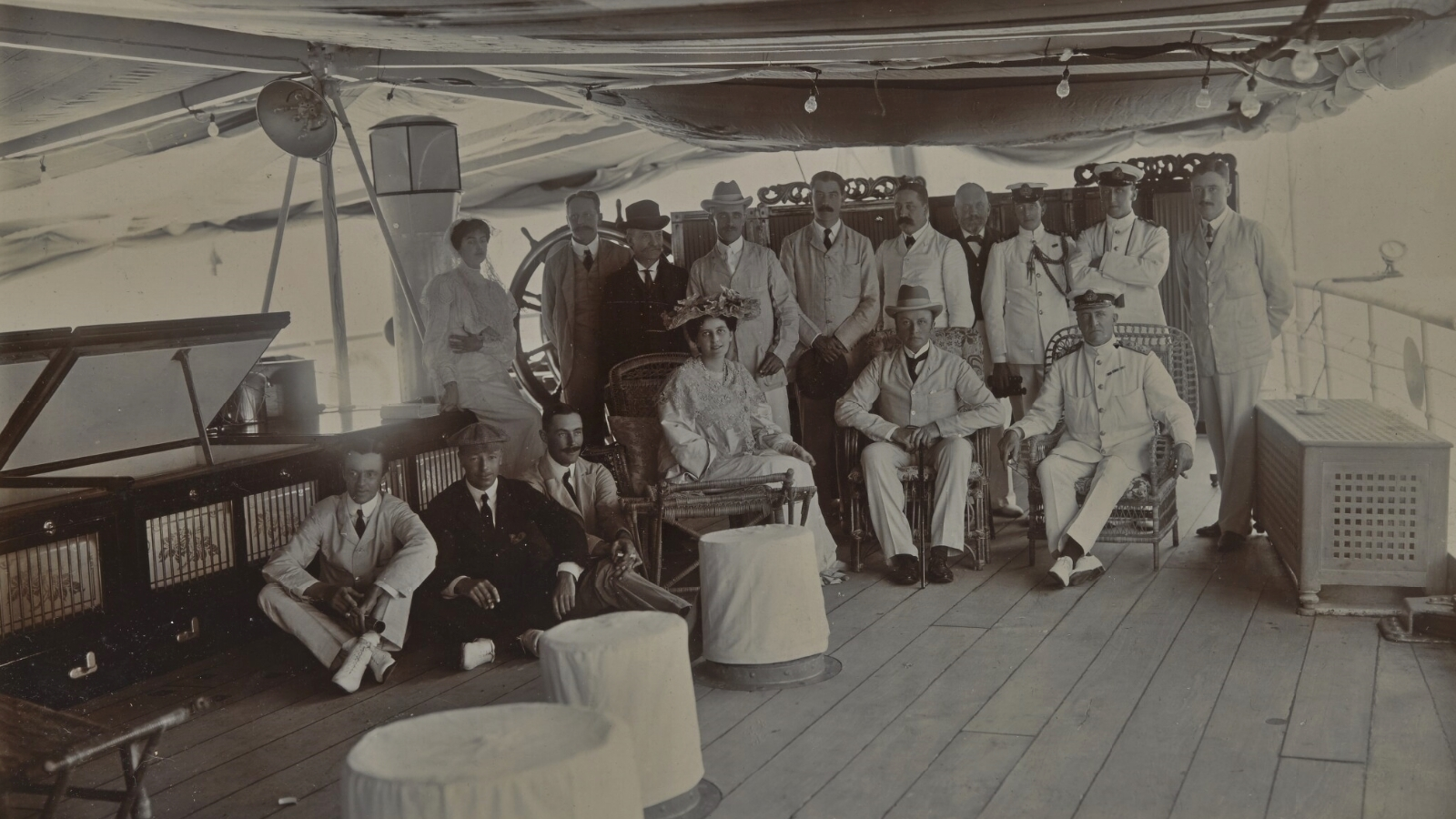
Curzon, his wife, and his staff on a tour of the Persian Gulf in 1903

Curzon was appalled by his government's apathy towards Persia as a valuable defensive buffer to India from Russian encroachment. Years later Curzon would lament that "Persia has alternatively advanced and receded in the estimation of British statesmen, occupying now a position of extravagant prominence, anon one of unmerited obscurity."

== First marriage (1895–1906) ==
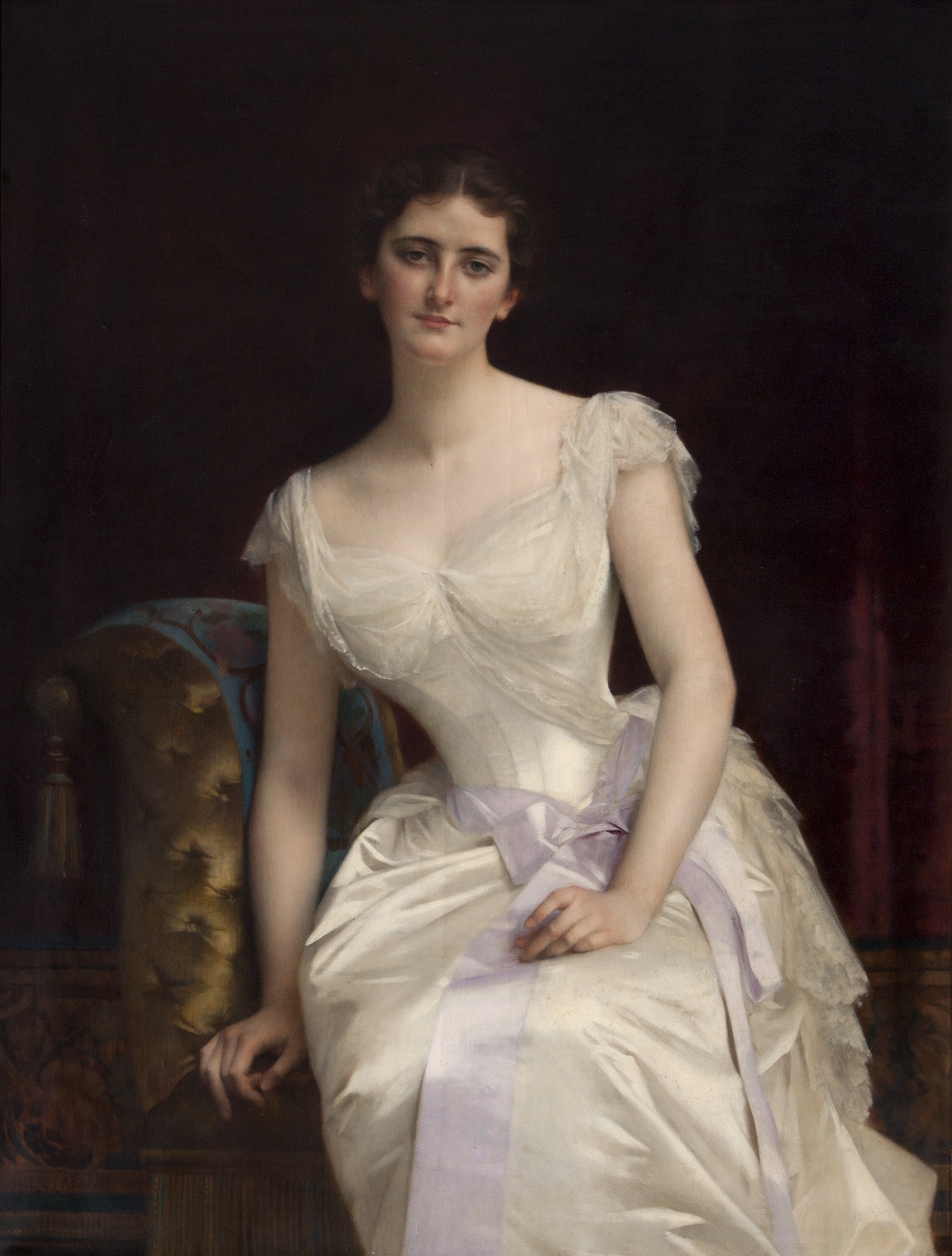
Mary Victoria Leiter by Alexandre Cabanel, 1887

On 22 April 1895, Curzon married Mary Victoria Leiter, the eldest daughter and co-heiress of Levi Leiter, an American millionaire of Jewish descent, who co-founded the Chicago department store Field & Leiter (later Marshall Field). Mary had a long and nearly fatal illness near the end of summer 1904, from which she never really recovered. Falling ill again in July 1906, she died on the 18th of that month in her husband's arms, at the age of 36. It was the greatest personal loss of his life.

She was buried in the church at Kedleston, where Curzon designed his memorial for her, a Gothic chapel added to the north side of the nave. Although he was neither a devout nor a conventional churchman, Curzon retained a simple religious faith; in later years he sometimes said that he was not afraid of death because it would enable him to join Mary in heaven.

They had three daughters during a firm and happy marriage: Mary Irene (known as Irene), who inherited her father's Barony of Ravensdale and was created a life peer in her own right; Cynthia Blanche, who became the first wife of the fascist politician Sir Oswald Mosley; and Alexandra Naldera ("Baba"), Curzon's youngest daughter; she married Edward "Fruity" Metcalfe, the best friend, best man and equerry of Edward VIII. Mosley exercised a strange fascination for the Curzon women: Irene had a brief romance with him before either were married; Baba became his mistress; and Curzon's second wife, Grace, had a long affair with him.

== Viceroy of India (1899–1905) ==
Curzon, in 1901, had famously said, "As long as we rule India we are the greatest power in the world. If we lose it, we shall drop straightaway to a third-rate power."

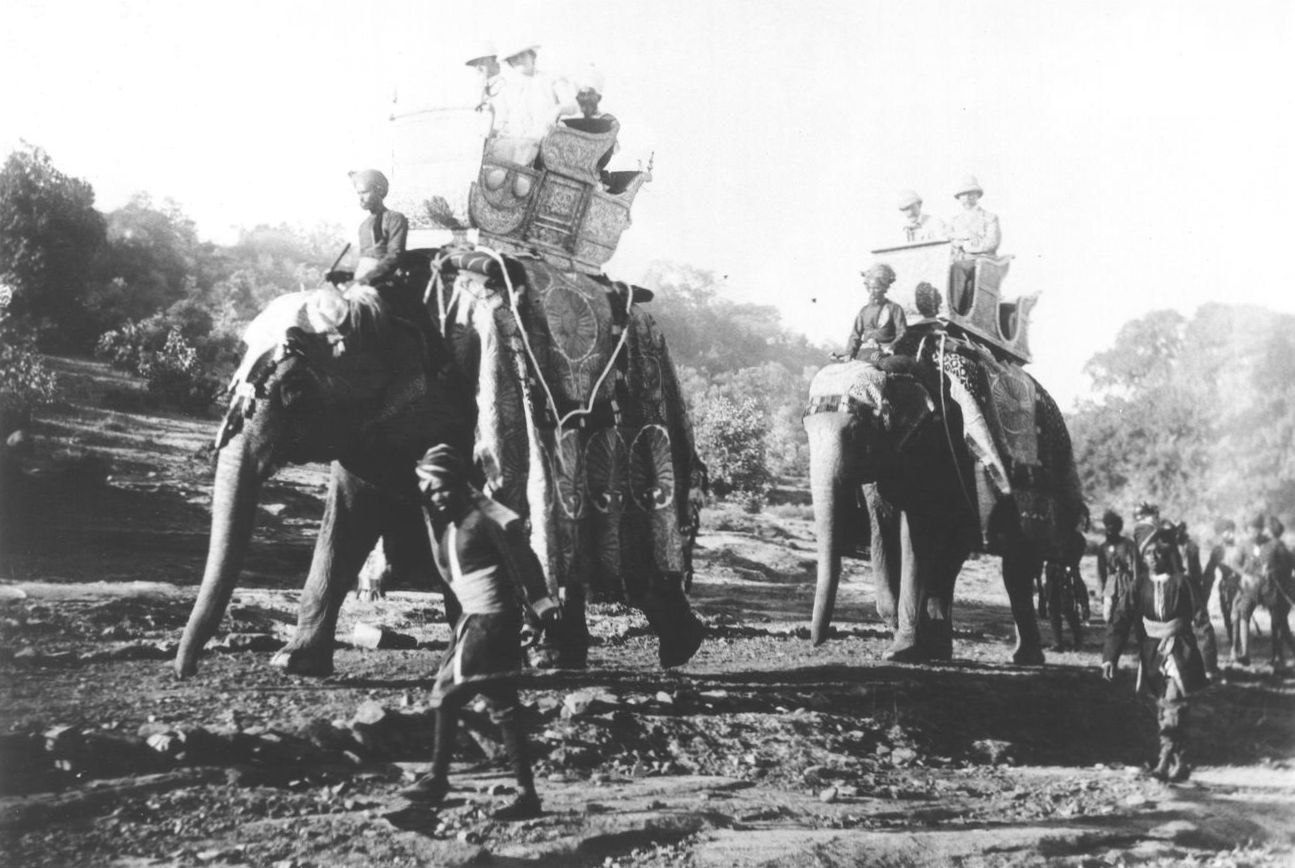
Curzon—procession to Sanchi Tope, 28 November 1899.

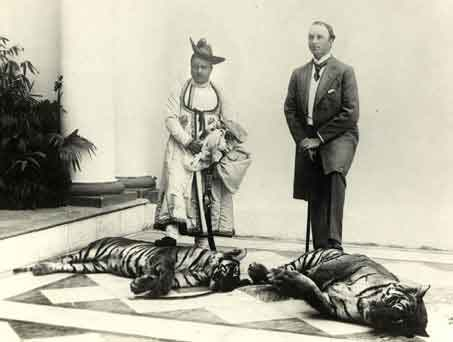
Curzon and Madho Rao Scindia, Maharaja of Gwalior, pose with hunted tigers, 1901.

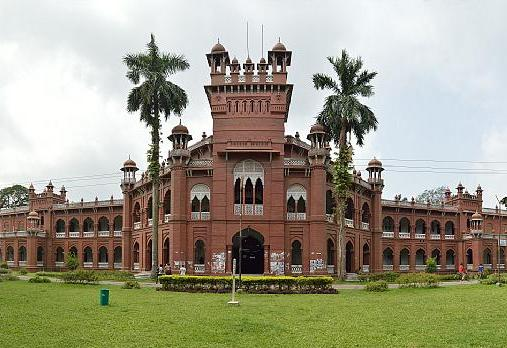
Curzon Hall of the University of Dhaka in Dhaka, Bangladesh

In January 1899 Curzon was appointed as Viceroy of India. He was created a baron in the peerage of Ireland as Baron Curzon of Kedleston, in the County of Derby, on his appointment. (The title was "Curzon of Kedleston" rather than simply "Curzon" because his kinsmen the Earls Howe were already Viscounts and Barons Curzon.) As Viceroy, he was ex officio Grand Master of the Order of the Indian Empire and Order of the Star of India. This peerage was created in the Peerage of Ireland (the last so created) so that he would be free, until his father's death, to re-enter the House of Commons on his return to Britain.

Reaching India shortly after the suppression of the frontier risings of 1897–98, he paid special attention to the independent tribes of the north-west frontier, inaugurated a new province called the North West Frontier Province, and pursued a policy of forceful control mingled with conciliation. In response to what he called "a number of murderous attacks upon Englishmen and Europeans", Curzon advocated at the Quetta Durbar extremely draconian punishments which he believed would stop what he viewed as such especially abominable crimes. In his own private correspondence, Curzon pondered "Is it possible, under the law, to flog these horrible scoundrels before we execute them? Supposing we remove them for execution to another and distant jail, could we flog them in the first jail before removal? I believe that if we could postpone the execution for a few weeks and give the criminal a few good public floggings – or even one, were more not possible – it would act as a real deterrent. But I have a suspicion that British law does not smile upon anything so eminently practical." The only major armed outbreak on this frontier during the period of his administration was the Mahsud-Waziri campaign of 1901.

In the context of the Great Game between the British and Russian Empires for control of Central Asia, he held deep mistrust of Russian intentions. This led him to encourage British trade in Persia, and he paid a visit to the Persian Gulf in 1903. Curzon argued for an exclusive British presence in the Gulf, a policy originally proposed by John Malcolm. The British government was already making agreements with local sheiks/tribal leaders along the Persian Gulf coast to this end. Curzon had convinced his government to establish Britain as the unofficial protector of Kuwait with the Anglo-Kuwaiti Agreement of 1899. The Lansdowne Declaration in 1903 stated that the British would counter any other European power's attempt to establish a military presence in the Gulf. Only four years later this position was abandoned and the Persian Gulf was declared a neutral zone in the Anglo-Russian Convention of 1907, prompted in part by the high economic cost of defending India from Russian advances.

=== Trucial States ===
That neutral status did not extend to the Trucial States, which were bound to Britain under a number of treaties signed since the General Maritime Treaty of 1820, including the Exclusive Agreement of 1892, which bound the Trucial Sheikhs 'not to enter into any agreement or correspondence with any Power other than the British Government'. On 21 November 1903, Curzon held a Darbar in Sharjah (today one of the United Arab Emirates) and addressed the Sheikhs of the Trucial Coast assembled on the Argonaut, moored some five miles offshore of Sharjah because of the shallow waters nearer land.

In his address to them, Curzon made it clear they should consider themselves blessed by the Pax Brittanica: they were to be appreciative of the peace the British had brought. The 'pacificated Arabs' were to consider that 'the influence of the British government must remain supreme' and abide by their treaty obligations by sea and on land. Three years later, in 1906, the Sheikhs were all presented with a bound collection of the treaties their predecessors had entered into with the British, as a reminder of the obligations they were considered to have inherited. Printed in both Arabic and English, the collection was introduced by a transcribed copy of Curzon's 1903 Durbar address.

=== Indian reform ===
At the end of 1903, Curzon sent a British expedition to Tibet under Francis Younghusband, ostensibly to forestall a Russian advance. After bloody conflicts with Tibet's poorly armed defenders, the mission penetrated to Lhasa, where the Treaty of Lhasa was signed in September 1904.

During his tenure, Curzon undertook the restoration of the Taj Mahal and expressed satisfaction that he had done so. Curzon was influenced by Hindu philosophy and quoted:

India has left a deeper mark upon the history the philosophy and the religion of mankind than any other terrestrial unit in the universe.

Within India, Curzon appointed a number of commissions to inquire into education, irrigation, police and other branches of administration, on whose reports legislation was based during his second term of office as viceroy. Reappointed Governor-General in August 1904, he presided over the 1905 partition of Bengal.

In 'Lion and the Tiger : The Rise and Fall of the British Raj, 1600–1947', Denis Judd wrote: "Curzon had hoped… to bind India permanently to the Raj. Ironically, his partition of Bengal, and the bitter controversy that followed, did much to revitalize Congress. Curzon, typically, had dismissed the Congress in 1900 as 'tottering to its fall'. But he left India with Congress more active and effective than at any time in its history."

Curzon was determined to address the British maltreatment of Indians. In particular, he incurred the displeasure of many in the European community in India by pressing for severe punishment for Europeans who had attacked Indians. On two occasions, he imposed collective punishment on British Army units which had attacked Indians: when soldiers of the West Kent Regiment raped a Burmese woman, he had the whole regiment exiled to Aden without leave. He later imposed similar punishment on the 9th Queen's Royal Lancers for the murder of an Indian cook.

Mahatma Gandhi lauded Curzon as the first viceroy to express sympathy for indentured Indian labourers and question why the system should continue. Curzon was especially concerned with the treatment of Indian emigrants to the Transvaal and Natal. After learning about the realities of labour conditions for indentured Indians, he deemed it impossible to defend the system in its current state, and committed to a stance of reform. In 1900, Curzon wrote an appeal to the Permanent Under-Secretary for India calling for indentured labourers to be treated better given their contribution to colonial defences, although this did not prompt immediate change. On 14 May 1903, he wrote a lengthy despatch to the India Office demanding full discretion to withdraw from the system of indentured labour if they would not concede to the proper treatment of Indian workers. He continued to champion this cause throughout his time as viceroy.

Curzon proposed the Partition of Bengal and put it into effect on 16 October 1905 creating the new province of Eastern Bengal and Assam. Behind this incident, his excuse was that the area of Bengal was too large and it was difficult for the British to administer efficiently but actually his intention was to divide Bengalis into religious and territorial grounds to weaken the growing nationalism in Bengal. He said, "Partition of Bengal is a settled fact and what is settled cannot be unsettled." Huge protest (Swadeshi movement) was seen from every corner of Bengal and on 1911 this so-called "settled fact" became "unsettled" by Lord Hardinge. It was done in response to the Swadeshi movement's riots in protest against the policy but the partition animated the Muslims to form their own national organization along communal lines.

=== Indian Army ===
Curzon took an active interest in military matters and in 1901 he founded the Imperial Cadet Corps, or ICC. The ICC was a corps d'elite, designed to give Indian princes and aristocrats military training, after which a few would be given officer commissions in the Indian Army but these commissions were "special commissions" which did not empower their holders to command any troops. Predictably, this was a major stumbling block to the ICC's success, as it caused much resentment among former cadets. Though the ICC closed in 1914, it was a crucial stage in the drive to Indianise the Indian Army's officer corps, which was haltingly begun in 1917.

Military organisation proved to be the final issue faced by Curzon in India. It often involved petty issues that had much to do with clashes of personality: Curzon once wrote on a document "I rise from the perusal of these papers filled with the sense of the ineptitude of my military advisers", and once wrote to the Commander-in-Chief, India, Herbert Kitchener, 1st Earl Kitchener, advising him that signing himself "Kitchener of Khartoum" took up too much time and space, which Kitchener thought petty (Curzon simply signed himself "Curzon" as if he were a hereditary peer, although he later took to signing himself "Curzon of Kedleston"). A difference of opinion with Kitchener regarding the status of the military member of the Viceroy's Executive Council (who controlled army supply and logistics, which Kitchener wanted under his own control), led to a controversy in which Curzon failed to obtain the support of the home government. He resigned in August 1905 and returned to England.

=== Indian famine ===
A major famine coincided with Curzon's time as viceroy in which 1 to 4.5 million people died. Curzon implemented a variety of measures, including opening up famine relief works that fed between 3 and 5 million, reducing taxes and spending vast amounts of money on irrigation works. In Late Victorian Holocausts, the historian Mike Davis criticised Curzon for cutting back rations and raising relief eligibility. At the time, Curzon stated that "any government which imperiled the financial position of India in the interests of prodigal philanthropy would be open to serious criticism; but any government which by indiscriminate alms-giving weakened the fibre and demoralized the self-reliance of the population, would be guilty of a public crime."

== Return to Britain ==
Arthur Balfour's refusal to recommend an earldom for Curzon in 1905 was repeated by Sir Henry Campbell-Bannerman, the Liberal prime minister, who formed his government the day after Curzon returned to England. In deference to the wishes of the King and the advice of his doctors, Curzon did not stand in the general election of 1906 and thus found himself excluded from public life for the first time in twenty years. It was at this time, the nadir of his career, that Mary died.

After the death of Lord Goschen in 1907, the post of Chancellor of Oxford University fell vacant. Curzon was elected as Chancellor of Oxford after by 1,001 votes to 440 against Lord Rosebery. He proved to be an active chancellor – "[he] threw himself so energetically into the cause of university reform that critics complained he was ruling Oxford like an Indian province."

== House of Lords ==
In 1908, Curzon was elected an Irish representative peer, and thus relinquished any idea of returning to the House of Commons. In 1909–1910 he took an active part in opposing the Liberal government's proposal to abolish the legislative veto of the House of Lords, and in 1911 was created Baron Ravensdale, of Ravensdale in the County of Derby, with remainder (in default of heirs male) to his daughters, Viscount Scarsdale, of Scarsdale in the County of Derby, with remainder (in default of heirs male) to the heirs male of his father, and Earl Curzon of Kedleston, in the County of Derby, with the normal remainder, all in the Peerage of the United Kingdom.

He became involved with saving Tattershall Castle, Lincolnshire, from destruction. This experience strengthened his resolve for heritage protection. He was one of the sponsors of the Ancient Monuments Consolidation and Amendment Act 1913. He served as President of the Committee commissioning the Survey of London which documented the capital's principal buildings and public art.

On 5 May 1914, he spoke out against a bill in the House of Lords that would have permitted women who already had the right to vote in local elections the right to vote for members of Parliament.

== First World War ==
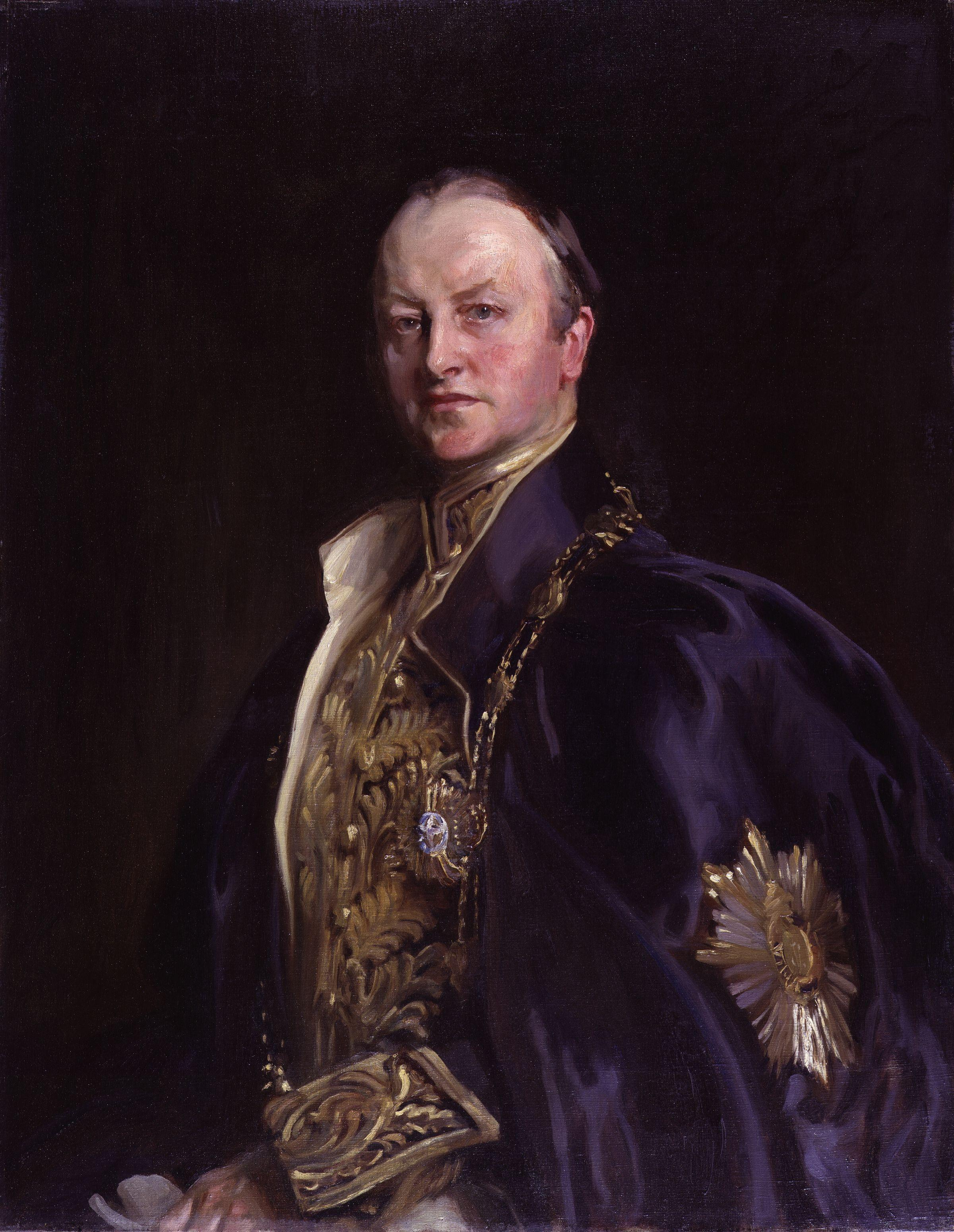
Lord Curzon of Kedleston by John Singer Sargent, 1914. Royal Geographical Society

Curzon joined the Cabinet, as Lord Privy Seal, when Asquith formed his coalition in May 1915. Like other politicians (e.g. Austen Chamberlain, Arthur Balfour) Curzon favoured British Empire efforts in Mesopotamia, believing that the increase in British prestige would discourage a German-inspired Muslim revolt in India. Curzon was a member of the Dardanelles Committee and told that body (October 1915) that the recent Salonika expedition was "quixotic chivalry". Early in 1916 Curzon visited Sir Douglas Haig (newly appointed Commander-in-Chief of British forces in France) at his headquarters in France. Haig was impressed by Curzon's brains and decisiveness, and considered that he had mellowed since his days as viceroy (Major-General Haig had been Inspector-General of Cavalry, India, at the time) and had lost "his old pompous ways". Curzon served in Lloyd George's small War cabinet as Leader of the House of Lords from December 1916, and he also served on the War Policy Committee. With Allied victory over Germany far from certain, Curzon wrote a paper (12 May 1917) for the War Cabinet urging that Britain seize Palestine and possibly Syria. Like other members of the War Cabinet, Curzon supported further Western Front offensives lest, with Russian commitment to the war wavering, France and Italy be tempted to make a separate peace.

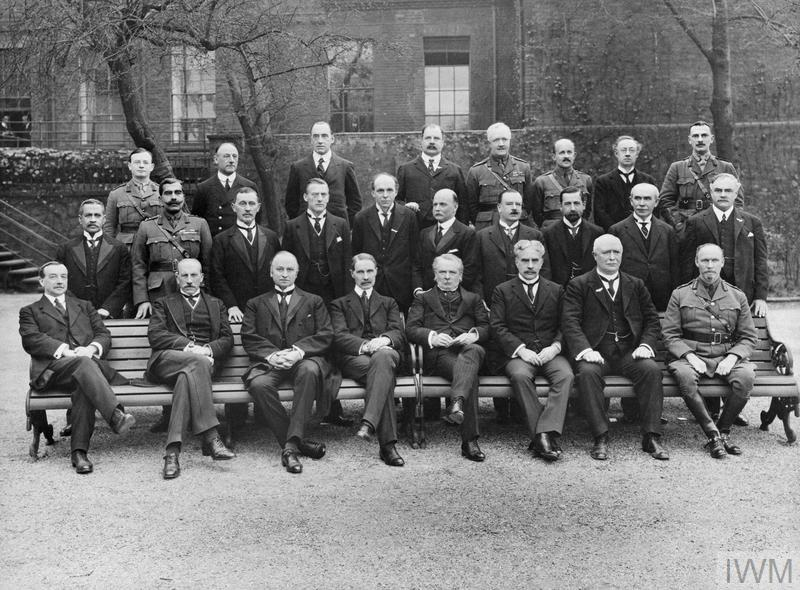
Imperial War Cabinet (1917) Lord Curzon seated, third from the left

At the War Policy Committee (3 October 1917) Curzon objected in vain to plans to redeploy two divisions to Palestine, with a view to advancing into Syria and knocking the Ottoman Empire out of the war altogether. Curzon's commitment wavered somewhat as the losses of the Third Battle of Ypres mounted. In the summer of 1917 the Chief of the Imperial General Staff (CIGS) General William Robertson sent Haig a biting description of the members of the War Cabinet, who he said were all frightened of Lloyd George; he described Curzon as "a gasbag". During the crisis of February 1918, Curzon was one of the few members of the government to support Robertson, threatening in vain to resign if he were removed. Despite his opposition to women's suffrage (he had been co-president of the National League for Opposing Woman Suffrage), the House of Lords voted conclusively in its favour.

== Second marriage (1917) ==
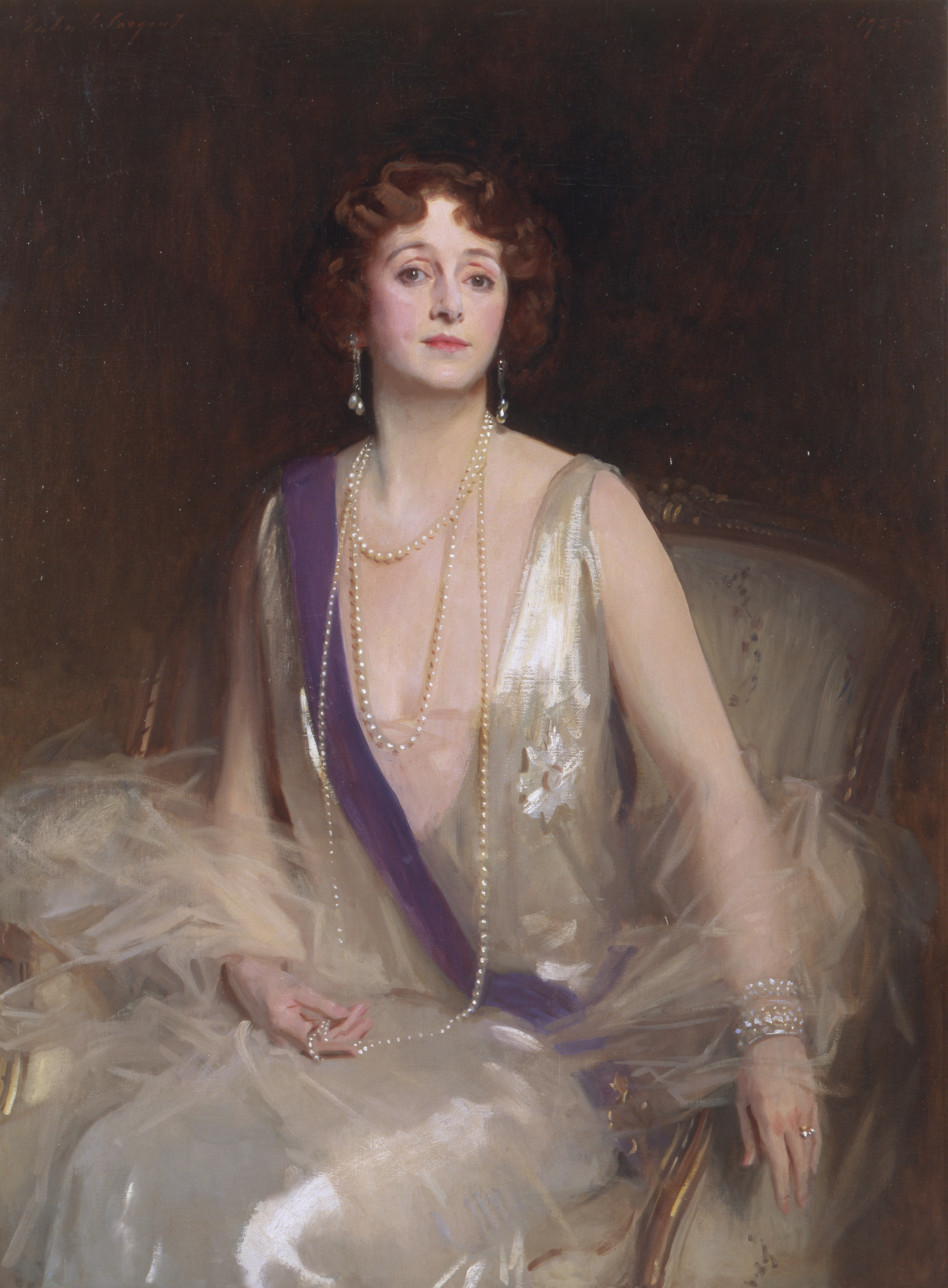
Grace Elvina, second wife

After a long affair with the romantic novelist Elinor Glyn, Curzon married the former Grace Elvina Hinds in January 1917. She was the wealthy Alabama-born widow of Alfredo Huberto Duggan (died 1915), a first-generation Irish Argentinian appointed to the Argentine Legation in London in 1905. Elinor Glyn was staying with Curzon at the time of the engagement and read about it in the morning newspapers.

Grace had three children from her first marriage, two sons, Alfred and Hubert, and a daughter, Grace Lucille. Alfred and Hubert, as Curzon's step-sons, grew up within his influential circle. Curzon had three daughters from his first marriage, but he and Grace (despite fertility-related operations and several miscarriages) did not have any children together, which put a strain on their marriage. Letters written between them in the early 1920s imply that they still lived together, and remained devoted to each other. In 1923, Curzon was passed over for the office of Prime Minister partly on the advice of Arthur Balfour, who joked that Curzon "has lost the hope of glory but he still possesses the means of Grace" (a humorous allusion to the well known "General Thanksgiving" prayer of the Church of England, which thanks God for "the means of grace, and for the hope of glory").

In 1917, Curzon bought Bodiam Castle in East Sussex, a 14th-century building that had been gutted during the English Civil War. He restored it extensively, and then bequeathed it to the National Trust. From 1915 he also rented Montacute House as a residence for himself and Elinor Glyn.

== Foreign Secretary (1919–1924) ==
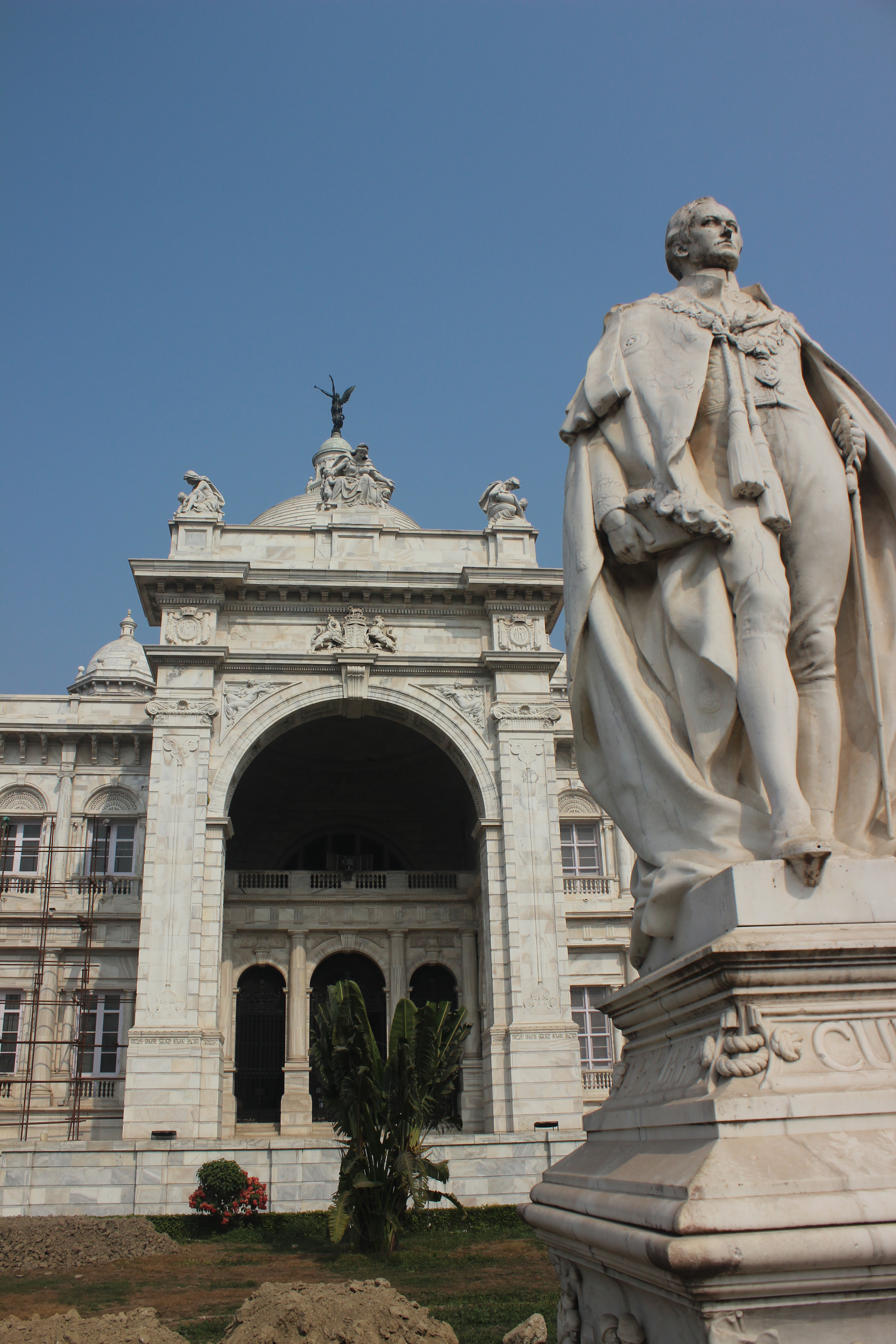
Statue of Curzon in front of the Victoria Memorial, Kolkata

=== Relations with Lloyd George ===
Curzon did not have David Lloyd George's support. Curzon and Lloyd George had disliked one another since the 1911 Parliament Crisis. The Prime Minister thought him overly pompous and self-important, and it was said that he used him as if he were using a Rolls-Royce to deliver a parcel to the station; Lloyd George said much later that Winston Churchill treated his ministers in a way that Lloyd George would never have treated his: "Now my War Cabinet was different. They were all big men. I was never able to treat any of my colleagues the way Churchill treats all of his. Oh yes, there was one I treated that way — Curzon." Multiple drafts of resignation letters written at this time were found upon Curzon's death. Despite their antagonism, the two were often in agreement on government policy. Lloyd George needed the wealth of knowledge Curzon possessed so was both his biggest critic and, simultaneously, his largest supporter. Likewise, Curzon was grateful for the leeway he was allowed by Lloyd George when it came to handling affairs in the Middle East.

Other cabinet ministers also respected his vast knowledge of Central Asia but disliked his arrogance and often blunt criticism. Believing that the Foreign Secretary should be non-partisan, he would objectively present all the information on a subject to the Cabinet, as if placing faith in his colleagues to reach the appropriate decision. Conversely, Curzon would take personally and respond aggressively to any criticism.

It has been suggested that Curzon's defensiveness reflected institutional insecurity by the Foreign Office as a whole. During the 1920s the Foreign Office was often a passive participant in decisions which were mainly reactive and dominated by the prime minister. The creation of the job of Colonial Secretary, the Cabinet Office and the League of Nations added to the Foreign Office's insecurity.

=== Policy under Lloyd George ===
The territorial changes of Poland. Light blue line: Curzon Line "B" as proposed by Lord Curzon in 1919. Dark blue line: Curzon Line "A" as proposed by the Soviet Union in 1940. Pink: Formerly German provinces annexed by Poland after World War II. Grey: Pre–World War II Polish territory east of the Curzon Line annexed by the Soviet Union after the war.

After nine months as acting Secretary while Balfour was at the Paris Peace Conference, Curzon was appointed Foreign Secretary in October 1919. He gave his name to the British government's proposed Soviet-Polish boundary, the Curzon Line of December 1919. Although during the subsequent Polish-Soviet War, Poland conquered territory in the east, after World War II, Poland was shifted westwards, leaving the border between Poland and its eastern neighbours today approximately at the Curzon Line.

Curzon was largely responsible for the Peace Day ceremonies on 19 July 1919. These included the plaster Cenotaph, designed by the noted architect Sir Edwin Lutyens, for the Allied Victory parade in London. It was so successful that it was reproduced in stone, and still stands.

In 1918, during World War I, as Britain occupied Mesopotamia, Curzon tried to convince the Indian government to reconsider his scheme for Persia to be a buffer against Russian advances. British and Indian troops were in Persia protecting the oilfields at Abadan and watching the Afghan frontier – Curzon believed that British economic and military aid, sent via India, could prop up the Persian government and make her a British client state. The Anglo-Persian Agreement of August 1919 was never ratified and the British government rejected the plan as Russia had the geographical advantage and the defensive benefits would not justify the high economic cost.

Small British forces had twice occupied Baku on the Caspian in 1918, while an entire British division had occupied Batum on the Black Sea, supervising German and Turkish withdrawal. Against Curzon's wishes, but on the advice of Sir George Milne, the commander on the spot, the CIGS Sir Henry Wilson, who wanted to concentrate troops in Britain, Ireland, India, and Egypt, and of Churchill (Secretary of State for War), the British withdrew from Baku (the small British naval presence was also withdrawn from the Caspian Sea), at the end of August 1919 leaving only three battalions at Batum.

In January 1920 Curzon insisted that British troops remain in Batum, against the wishes of Wilson and the prime minister. In February, while Curzon was on holiday, Wilson persuaded the Cabinet to allow withdrawal, but Curzon had the decision reversed on his return, although to Curzon's fury (he thought it "abuse of authority") Wilson gave Milne permission to withdraw if he deemed it necessary. At Cabinet on 5 May 1920 Curzon "by a long-winded jaw" (in Wilson's description) argued for a stay in Batum. After a British garrison at Enzeli (on the Persian Caspian coast) was taken prisoner by Bolshevik forces on 19 May 1920, Lloyd George finally insisted on a withdrawal from Batum early in June 1920. For the rest of 1920 Curzon, supported by Milner (Colonial Secretary), argued that Britain should retain control of Persia. When Wilson asked (15 July 1920) to pull troops out of Persia to put down the rebellions in Iraq and Ireland, Lloyd George blocked the move, saying that Curzon "would not stand it". In the end, financial retrenchment forced a British withdrawal from Persia in the spring of 1921.

Curzon worked on several Middle Eastern problems. He designed the Treaty of Sèvres (10 August 1920) between the victorious Allies and the Ottoman Empire. The treaty obliged the de facto end of Turkey's sovereign state status, but a new government in Turkey under Mustafa Kemal rejected the treaty. In response, the Greeks invaded Turkey. Curzon tried and failed to induce the Greeks to accept a compromise on the status of Smyrna and failed to force the Turks to renounce their nationalist program. Lloyd George tried to use force at Chanak but lost support and was forced to step down as prime minister. Curzon remained as foreign secretary and helped tie down loose ends in the Middle East at the peace conference at Lausanne.

Curzon helped to negotiate Egyptian independence (agreed in 1922) and the division of the British Mandate of Palestine, despite the strong disagreement he held with the policy of his predecessor Arthur Balfour, and helped create the Emirate of Transjordan for Faisal's brother, which may also have delayed the problems there. According to Sir David Gilmour, Curzon "was the only senior figure in the British government at the time who foresaw that its policy would lead to decades of Arab–Jewish hostility".

During the Irish War of Independence, but before the introduction of martial law in December 1920, Curzon suggested the "Indian" solution of blockading villages and imposing collective fines for attacks on the police and army.

In 1921 Curzon was granted the titles Earl of Kedleston, in the County of Derby, and Marquess Curzon of Kedleston.

In 1922, he was the chief negotiator for the Allies of the Treaty of Lausanne, which officially ended the war with the Ottoman Empire and defined the borders of Turkey.

Curzon defended the geopolitical talent of Eyre Crowe, who served as Permanent Under-Secretary at the Foreign Office from 1920 until his death in 1925.

=== Under Bonar Law ===
Unlike many leading Conservative members of Lloyd George's Coalition Cabinet, Curzon ceased to support Lloyd George over the Chanak Crisis and had just resigned when Conservative backbenchers voted at the Carlton Club meeting to end the Coalition in October 1922. Curzon was thus able to remain Foreign Secretary when Bonar Law formed a purely Conservative ministry.

In 1922–23 Curzon had to negotiate with France after French troops occupied the Ruhr to enforce the payment of German reparations; he described the French Prime Minister (and former president) Raymond Poincaré as a "horrid little man". Curzon had expansive ambitions and was not much happier with Bonar Law, whose foreign policy was based on "retrenchment and withdrawal", than he had been with Lloyd George. Curzon provided invaluable insight into the Middle East and was instrumental in shaping British foreign policy in that region.

== Passed over for the premiership, 1923 ==
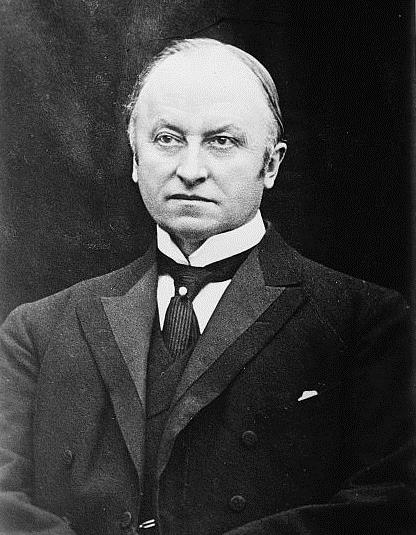
Curzon c. 1920–1925

On Bonar Law's retirement as prime minister in May 1923, Curzon was passed over in favour of Stanley Baldwin, despite his eagerness for the job.

This decision was taken on the private advice of leading members of the party including former Prime Minister Arthur Balfour. Balfour advised the monarch that in a democratic age it was inappropriate for the prime minister to be a member of the House of Lords, especially when the Labour Party, which had few peers, had become the main opposition party in the Commons. In private Balfour admitted that he was prejudiced against Curzon, whose character was objectionable to some. George V shared this prejudice. A letter purporting to detail the opinions of Bonar Law but actually written by Baldwin sympathisers was delivered to the King's Private Secretary Lord Stamfordham, though it is unclear how much impact this had in the outcome. Curzon felt he was cheated because J. C. C. Davidson—to whom Baldwin was loyal—and Sir Charles Waterhouse falsely claimed to Stamfordham that Law had recommended that George V appoint Stanley Baldwin, not Curzon, as his successor. Harry Bennett says Curzon's arrogance and unpopularity probably prevented him from becoming prime minister despite his brilliance, great capacity for work and accomplishments.

Winston Churchill, one of Curzon's main rivals, accurately contended that Curzon "sow[ed] gratitude and resentment along his path with equally lavish hands". Even contemporaries who envied Curzon, such as Baldwin, conceded that Curzon was, in the words of his biographer Leonard Mosley, "a devoted and indefatigable public servant, dedicated to the idea of Empire".

Curzon, summoned by Stamfordham, rushed to London assuming he was to be appointed. He burst into tears when told the truth. He later ridiculed Baldwin as "a man of the utmost insignificance", although he served under Baldwin and proposed him for the leadership of the Conservative Party. Curzon remained foreign secretary under Baldwin until the government fell in January 1924. When Baldwin formed a new government in November 1924 he appointed Curzon Lord President of the Council.

Curzon's rejection was a turning point in the nation's political history. Henceforth, by convention peers were deemed to be barred from being leaders of major political parties and from becoming prime minister. In an age of democracy, it was no longer acceptable for the prime minister to be based in an unelected and largely powerless chamber.

== Death ==
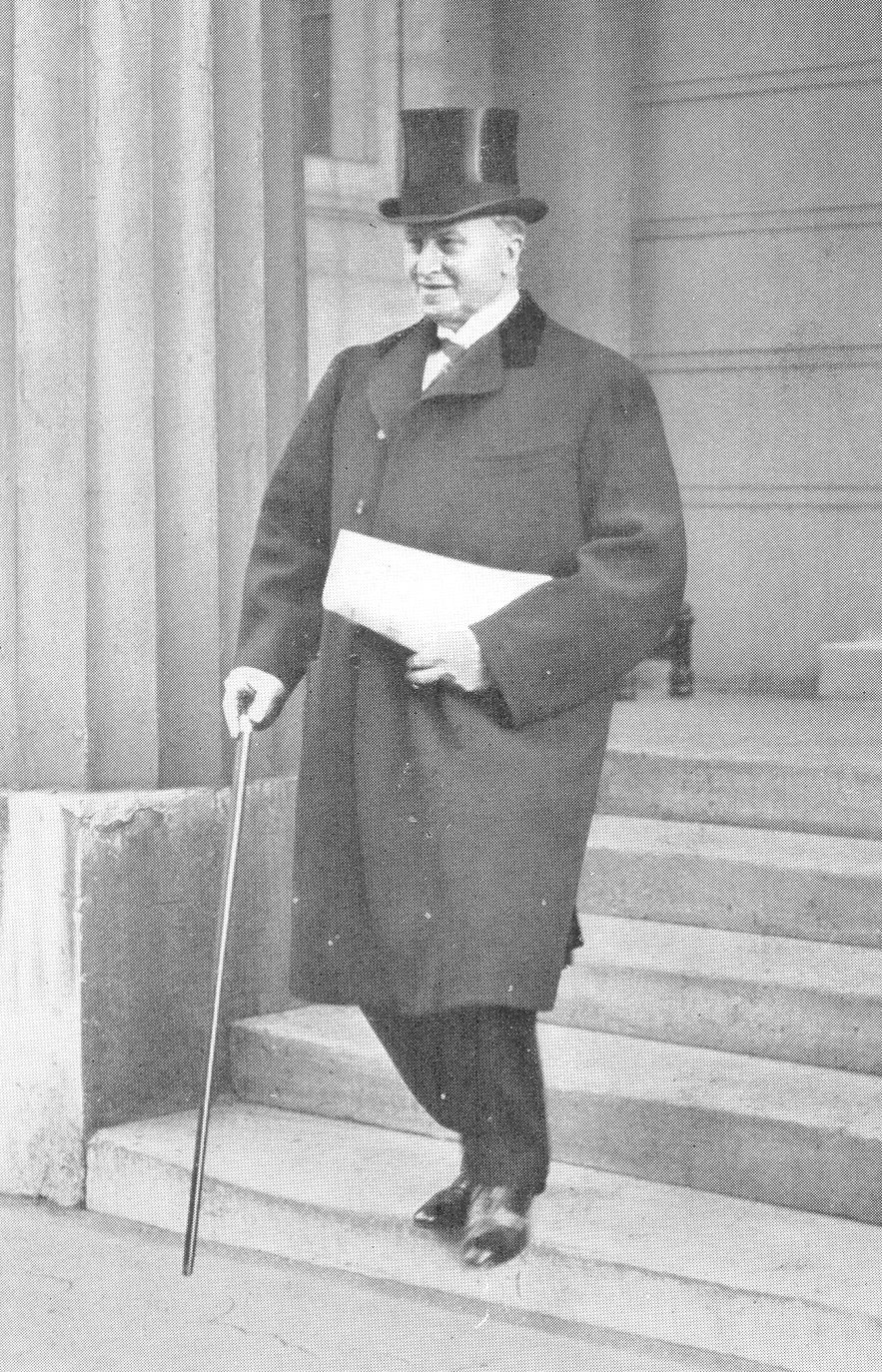
The last photograph taken of Curzon on his way to attend a cabinet meeting (1925)

In March 1925 Curzon suffered a severe haemorrhage of the bladder. Surgery was unsuccessful and he died in London on 20 March 1925 at the age of 66. His coffin, made from the same tree at Kedleston that had encased his first wife, Mary, was taken to Westminster Abbey and from there to his ancestral home in Derbyshire, where he was interred beside Mary in the family vault at All Saints Church on 26 March. In his will, proven on 22 July, Curzon bequeathed his estate to his wife and his brother Francis; his estate was valued for probate at £343,279 10s. 4d. (roughly equivalent to £18 million in 2025).

Upon his death the barony, earldom and marquessate of Curzon of Kedleston and the earldom of Kedleston became extinct, while the viscountcy and barony of Scarsdale were inherited by a nephew. The barony of Ravensdale was inherited by his eldest daughter Mary and is today held by his second daughter Cynthia's great-grandson, Daniel Mosley, 4th Baron Ravensdale.

There is a blue plaque on the house in London where Curzon lived and died, No. 1 Carlton House Terrace, Westminster.

== Titles ==
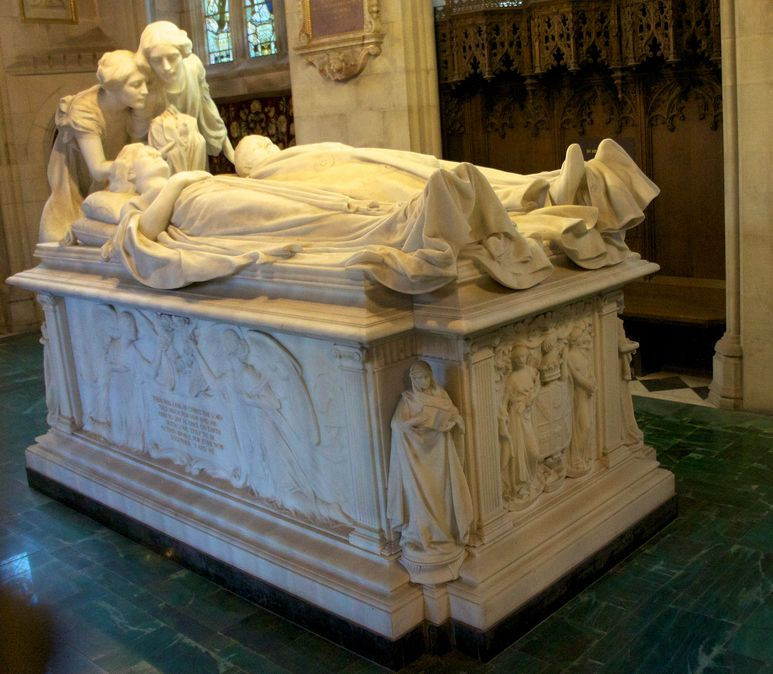
George and Mary Curzon's tomb in All Saints, Keddleston, sculpted in 1931 by Bertram Mackennal.

On his appointment as Viceroy of India in 1898, he was created Baron Curzon of Kedleston, in the County of Derby. This title was created in the Peerage of Ireland to enable him to potentially return to the House of Commons, as Irish peers did not have an automatic right to sit in the House of Lords. His was the last title to be created in the Peerage of Ireland. In 1908, he was elected a representative of the Irish peerage in the British House of Lords, from which it followed that he would be a member of the House of Lords until death; indeed, his Irish representative peerage would continue even if (as proved to be the case) he later received a United Kingdom peerage entitling him to a seat in the House of Lords in his own right.

In 1911 he was created Earl Curzon of Kedleston, Viscount Scarsdale, and Baron Ravensdale. All of these titles were in the Peerage of the United Kingdom.

Upon his father's death in 1916, he also became 5th Baron Scarsdale, in the Peerage of Great Britain. The title had been created in 1761.

In the 1921 Birthday Honours, he was created Marquess Curzon of Kedleston. The title became extinct upon his death in 1925, as he was survived by three daughters and no sons.

== Assessment ==
Few statesmen have experienced such changes in fortune in both their public and their personal lives. David Gilmour concludes:

Curzon's career was an almost unparalleled blend of triumph and disappointment. Although he was the last and in many ways the greatest of Victorian viceroys, his term of office ended in resignation, empty of recognition and barren of reward.... he was unable to assert himself fully as Foreign Secretary until the last weeks of Lloyd George's premiership. And finally, after he had restored his reputation at Lausanne, his last ambition was thwarted by George V.

Critics generally agreed that Curzon never reached the heights that his youthful talents had seemed destined to reach. This sense of opportunities missed was summed up by Winston Churchill in his book Great Contemporaries (1937):

The morning had been golden, the noontide was bronze, and the evening lead. But all were solid, and each was polished till it shone after its fashion.

Churchill also wrote there was certainly something lacking in Curzon:

it was certainly not information nor application, nor power of speech nor attractiveness of manner and appearance. Everything was in his equipment. You could unpack his knapsack and take an inventory item by item. Nothing on the list was missing, yet somehow or other the total was incomplete.

His Cabinet colleague David Lindsay, 27th Earl of Crawford provided a withering personal judgment in his diary; "I never knew a man less loved by his colleagues and more hated by his subordinates, never a man so bereft of conscience, of charity or of gratitude. On the other hand the combination of power, of industry, and of ambition with a mean personality is almost without parallel. I never attended a funeral ceremony at which the congregation was so dry-eyed!"

The first leader of independent India, Jawaharlal Nehru, paid Curzon a tribute, stating that as viceroy, Curzon exhibited real love of Indian culture. He ordered a restoration project for several historic monuments, including the Taj Mahal:

After every other Viceroy has been forgotten, Curzon will be remembered because he restored all that was beautiful in India.

== Legacy ==
By special remainders, although he had no son, two of Curzon's peerages survive to the present day. His barony of Ravensdale went first to his eldest daughter, Irene Curzon, 2nd Baroness Ravensdale, and then to his grandson Nicholas Mosley, both of whom sat in the House of Lords, while his Viscount Scarsdale title went to a nephew. His great-great-grandson Daniel Mosley, 4th Baron Ravensdale, is a current member of the House of Lords, having been elected as a representative hereditary peer.

Curzon Hall, the home of the faculty of science at the University of Dhaka, is named after him. Curzon had inaugurated the building in 1904.

Curzon Gate, a ceremonial gate, was erected by Maharaja Bijay Chand Mahatab in the heart of Burdwan town and was renamed to commemorate Lord Curzon's visit to the town in 1904, which was renamed as Bijay Toran after the independence of India in 1947.

Curzon Road, the road connecting India Gate, the memorial dedicated to the Indians fallen during the Great War of 1914–18, and Connaught Place, in New Delhi was named after him. It has since been renamed Kasturba Gandhi Marg. The apartment buildings on the same road are named after him.

== Bibliography ==
=== Curzon's writings ===
- Curzon, Russia in Central Asia in 1889 and the Anglo-Russian Question (1889) Frank Cass & Co. Ltd., London (reprinted Cass, 1967), Adamant Media Corporation; ISBN 978-1-4021-7543-5 (27 February 2001) Reprint (Paperback) Details
- Curzon, Persia and the Persian Question (1892) Longmans, Green, and Co., London and New York.; facsimile reprint:
  - Volume 1 (Paperback) by George Nathaniel Curzon, Adamant Media Corporation; ISBN 978-1-4021-6179-7 (22 October 2001) Abstract
  - Volume 2 (Paperback) by George Nathaniel Curzon, Adamant Media Corporation; ISBN 978-1-4021-6178-0 (22 October 2001) Abstract
- Curzon, On the Indian Frontier, Edited with an introduction by Dhara Anjaria; (Oxford U.P. 2011) 350 pages ISBN 978-0-19-906357-4
- Curzon, Problems of the Far East (1894; new ed., 1896) George Nathaniel Curzon Problems of the Far East. Japan -Korea – China, reprint; ISBN 1-4021-8480-8, ISBN 978-1-4021-8480-2 (25 December 2000) Adamant Media Corporation (Paperback)Abstract
- Curzon, The Pamirs and the Source of the Oxus, 1897, The Royal Geographical Society. Geographical Journal 8 (1896): 97–119, 239–63. A thorough study of the region's history and people and of the British–Russian conflict of interest in Turkestan based on Curzon's travels there in 1894. Reprint (paperback): Adamant Media Corporation, ISBN 978-1-4021-5983-1 (22 April 2002) Abstract. Unabridged reprint (2005): Elbiron Classics, Adamant Media Corporation; ISBN 1-4021-5983-8 (pbk); ISBN 1-4021-3090-2 (hardcover).
- Curzon, The Romanes Lecture 1907, FRONTIERS by the Right Hon Lord Curzon of Kedleston G.C.S.I., G.C.I.E., PC, D.C.L., LL.D., F.R.S., All Souls College, Chancellor of the university, Delivered in the Sheldonian Theatre, Oxford, 2 November 1907 full text.
- Curzon, Tales of Travel. First published by Hodder & Stoughton 1923 (Century Classic Ser.) London, Century. 1989, Facsimile Reprint; ISBN 0-7126-2245-4; reprint with foreword by Lady Alexandra Metcalfe, Introduction by Peter King. A selection of Curzon's travel writing including essays on Egypt, Afghanistan, Persia, Iran, India, Iraq Waterfalls, etc. (includes the future viceroy's escapade into Afghanistan to meet the "Iron Emir", Abdu Rahman Khan, in 1894)
- Curzon and H. Avray Tipping. Finished by Henry Avray Tipping after Curzon's death: Marquess George Nathaniel Curzon Curzon of Kedleston and Henry Avray Tipping Tattershall Castle, Lincolnshire: A Historical & Descriptive Survey by the Late Marquis Curzon of Kedleston, K.G. and H. Avray Tipping (1929) at Google Books
- Curzon, Travels with a Superior Person, London, Sidgwick & Jackson. 1985, Reprint; ISBN 978-0-283-99294-0, Hardcover, illustrated with 90 contemporary photographs most of them from Curzon's own collection (includes Greece in the Eighties, pp. 78–84; edited by Peter King; introduced by Elizabeth, Countess Longford)

=== Secondary sources ===
- Bennet, G. H. (1995). British Foreign Policy During the Curzon Period, 1919–1924. New York: St. Martin's Press. ISBN 0-312-12650-6.
- Carrington, Michael. Officers, Gentlemen, and Murderers: Lord Curzon's campaign against 'collisions' between Indians and Europeans, 1899–1905, Modern Asian Studies 47:03, May 2013, pp. 780–819.
- Carrington, Michael. A PhD thesis, Empire and authority: Curzon, collisions, character and the Raj, 1899–1905. Discusses a number of interesting issues raised during Curzon's Viceroyalty (available through British Library).
- This article incorporates text from a publication now in the public domain: Chisholm, Hugh, ed. (1911). "Curzon of Kedleston, George Nathaniel, 1st Baron". Encyclopædia Britannica. Vol. 7 (11th ed.). Cambridge University Press. p. 665.
- De Groot, Gerard Douglas Haig 1861–1928 (Larkfield, Maidstone: Unwin Hyman, 1988)
- Dilks, David; Curzon in India (2 volumes, Rupert Hart-Davis, 1969 & 1970) online edition Archived 7 March 2007 at the Wayback Machine
- Edwardes, Michael. "The Viceroyalty Of Lord Curzon" History Today (Dec 1962) 12#12, pp. 833–844.
- Edwardes, Michael. High Noon of Empire: India under Curzon (1965).
- Gilmour, David (1994). UK: Curzon. London: John Murray; US: Curzon: Imperial Statesman. New York: Farrar, Straus & Giroux. excerpt and text search
- Gilmour, David. "Curzon, George Nathaniel, Marquess Curzon of Kedleston (1859–1925)" Oxford Dictionary of National Biography 2004; online edn, Jan 2011 accessed 30 Sept 2014 doi:10.1093/ref:odnb/32680
- Goudie A. S. (1980). "George Nathaniel Curzon: Superior Geographer", The Geographical Journal, 146, 2 (1980): 203–209, doi:10.2307/632861 Abstract
- Goradia, Nayana. Lord Curzon The Last of the British Moghuls (1993) full text online free.
- Jeffery, Keith (2006). Field Marshal Sir Henry Wilson: A Political Soldier. Oxford University Press. ISBN 978-0-19-820358-2.
- Katouzian, Homa. "The Campaign Against the Anglo-Iranian Agreement of 1919." British Journal of Middle Eastern Studies 25 (1) (1998): 5–46.
- Loades, David, ed. Reader's Guide to British History (2003) 1:324-25; historiography
- Lindsay, David (1984). John Vincent (ed.). The Crawford Papers: The journals of David Lindsay, twenty-seventh Earl of Crawford and tenth Earl of Balcarres 1871–1940 during the years 1892 to 1940. Manchester: Manchester University Press. ISBN 978-0-71900-948-8.
- McLane, John R. "The Decision to Partition Bengal in 1905", Indian Economic and Social History Review, July 1965, 2#3, pp 221–237
- Mosley, Leonard Oswald. The glorious fault: The life of Lord Curzon (1960)online
- Nicolson, Harold George (1934). Curzon: The Last Phase, 1919–1925: A Study in Post-war Diplomacy. London: Constable. ISBN 9780571258925
- Reid, Walter. Architect of Victory: Douglas Haig (Birlinn Ltd, Edinburgh, 2006.) ISBN 1-84158-517-3
- Ronaldshay, Earl of (1927). The Life of Lord Curzon. (Two volumes; London)
- Rose, Kenneth. Superior Person: A Portrait of Curzon and His Circle in Late Victorian England, Weidenfeld & Nicolson, 1969 ISBN 1842122339
- Ross, Christopher N. B. "Lord Curzon and E. G. Browne Confront the 'Persian Question'", Historical Journal, 52, 2 (2009): 385–411, doi:10.1017/S0018246X09007511
- Woodward, David R., Field Marshal Sir William Robertson, Westport Connecticut & London: Praeger, 1998, ISBN 0-275-95422-6
- Wright, Denis. "Curzon and Persia". The Geographical Journal 153 (3) (1987): 343–350.

Parliament of the United Kingdom
Preceded by George Augustus Pilkington	Member of Parliament for Southport; 1886–1898	Succeeded by Sir Herbert Naylor-Leyland, Bt
Political offices
Preceded by Sir John Eldon Gorst	Under-Secretary of State for India; 1891–1892	Succeeded by George W. E. Russell
Preceded by Sir Edward Grey	Under-Secretary of State for Foreign Affairs; 1895–1898	Succeeded by St John Brodrick
Preceded by Edward Stanley, 17th Earl of Derby as Chairman of the Joint War Air Committee	President of the Air Board; 1916–1917	Succeeded by Weetman Pearson, 1st Viscount Cowdray
Preceded by Robert Crewe-Milnes, 1st Marquess of Crewe	Lord Privy Seal; 1915–1916	Succeeded by David Lindsay, 27th Earl of Crawford
Preceded by Robert Crewe-Milnes, 1st Marquess of Crewe	Leader of the House of Lords; 1916–1924	Succeeded by Richard Haldane, 1st Viscount Haldane
Preceded by Robert Crewe-Milnes, 1st Marquess of Crewe	Lord President of the Council; 1916–1919	Succeeded by Arthur Balfour
Preceded by Arthur Balfour	Foreign Secretary; 1919–1924	Succeeded by Ramsay MacDonald
Preceded by Charles Cripps, 1st Baron Parmoor	Lord President of the Council; 1924–1925	Succeeded by Arthur Balfour
Preceded by Richard Haldane, 1st Viscount Haldane	Leader of the House of Lords; 1924–1925	Succeeded by James Gascoyne-Cecil, 4th Marquess of Salisbury
Government offices
Preceded by Victor Bruce, 9th Earl of Elgin	Viceroy of India; 1899–1905	Succeeded by Gilbert Elliot-Murray-Kynynmound, 4th Earl of Minto
Party political offices
Preceded by Henry Petty-Fitzmaurice, 5th Marquess of Lansdowne	Leader of the Conservative Party in the House of Lords; 1916–1925	Succeeded by James Gascoyne-Cecil, 4th Marquess of Salisbury
Preceded by Bonar Law	Leader of the Conservative Party with Austen Chamberlain; 1921–1922	Succeeded by Bonar Law
Honorary titles
Preceded by Robert Gascoyne-Cecil, 3rd Marquess of Salisbury	Lord Warden of the Cinque Ports; 1904–1905	Succeeded by George, Prince of Wales
Academic offices
Preceded by George Goschen, 1st Viscount Goschen	Chancellor of the University of Oxford; 1907–1925	Succeeded by Viscount Cave
Preceded by H. H. Asquith	Rector of the University of Glasgow; 1908–1911	Succeeded by Augustine Birrell
Peerage of the United Kingdom
New creation	Marquess Curzon of Kedleston; 1921–1925	Extinct
New creation	Earl Curzon of Kedleston; 1911–1925	Extinct
New creation	Viscount Scarsdale; 1911–1925	Succeeded by Richard Curzon
New creation	Baron Ravensdale; 1911–1925	Succeeded by Irene Curzon
Peerage of Great Britain
Preceded by Alfred Curzon	Baron Scarsdale; 1916–1925	Succeeded by Richard Curzon
Peerage of Ireland
New creation	Baron Curzon of Kedleston; 1898–1925	Extinct
Preceded by Francis Browne, 4th Baron Kilmaine	Representative peer for Ireland; 1908–1925	Office lapsed
