= Pierre de La Chapelle =

Catholic bishop

- Bishop of Paris
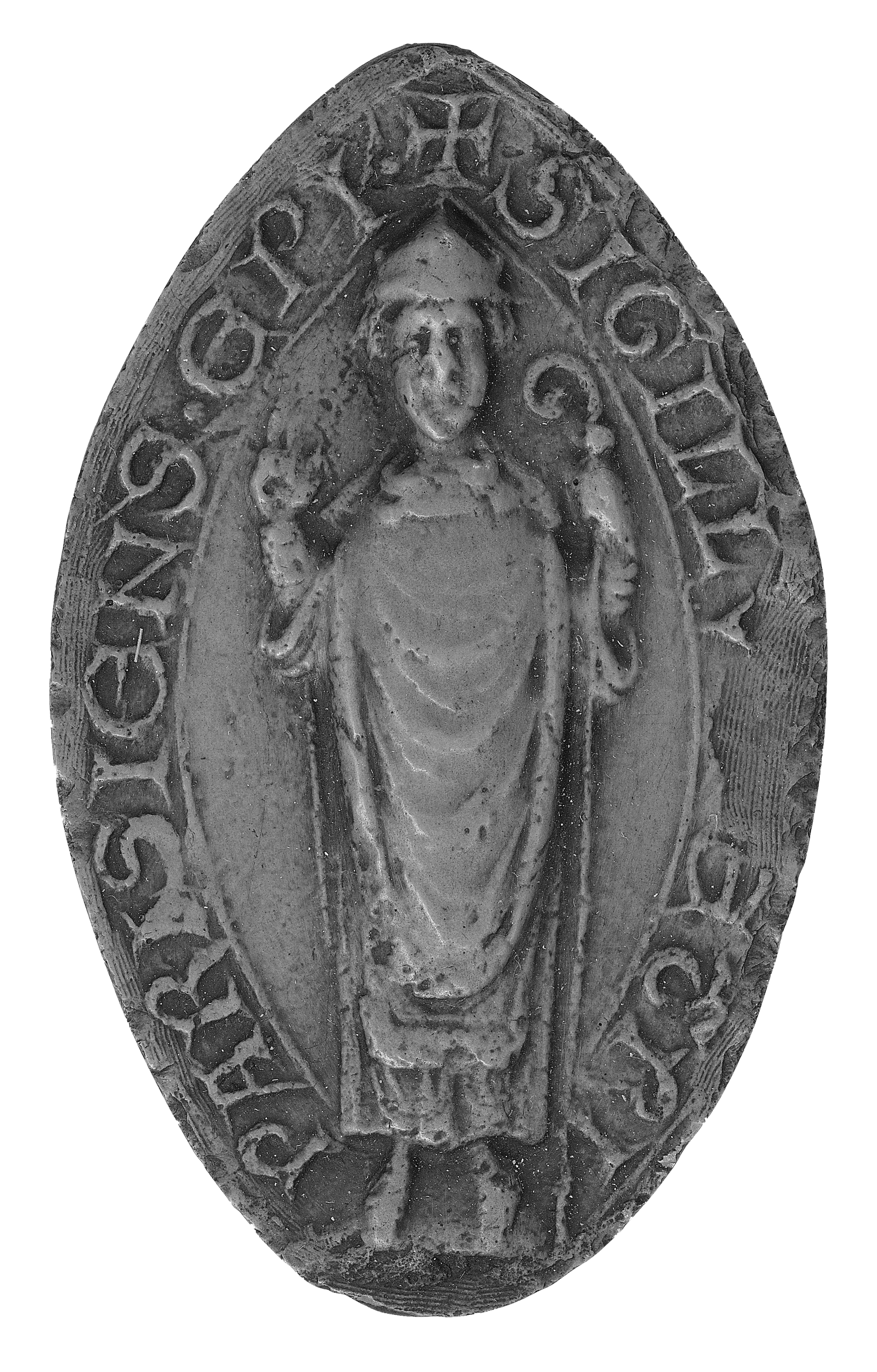
- Pierre's sigil
- In office: 1208 - 1219
- Predecessor: Eudes de Sully
- Successor: Guillaume de Seignelay
- Other post: Treasurer of the Basilica of Saint Martin

Personal details
- Died: 1219
- Parents: Gauthier de Villebéon; Aveline of Nemours

Pierre de La Chapelle (of Nemours) (died 1219) was Bishop of Paris from 1208 until his death.

== Life ==
He was the son of Gauthier de Villebéon, lord of Villebéon and La Chapelle, Grand Chamberlain of France, and Aveline of Nemours. He was the treasurer of the Basilica of Saint Martin, before being elected bishop of Paris in 1208.

De La Chapelle is notable for being one of the chief persecutors of the Amalricians, obtaining undercover information that shed light on the inner workings of the group and burning at the stake a number of members and David of Dinant's works. In 1211, he also took part in the Albigensian Crusade, even if only for a few months.

In 1212, he attended the council held by a papal legate, Robert de Courçon, where regulations were put in place concerning the chapter's office of chancellor. In 1217 he welcomed the Dominican Order in Paris.

In 1218, de La Chapelle went on the Fifth Crusade. He died the following year, during the siege of Damietta.

Catholic Church titles
| Preceded by Eudes de Sully | Bishop of Paris; 1208 - 1219 | Succeeded by Guillaume de Seignelay |
