= Amalrician =

Pantheist movement named after Amalric of Bena

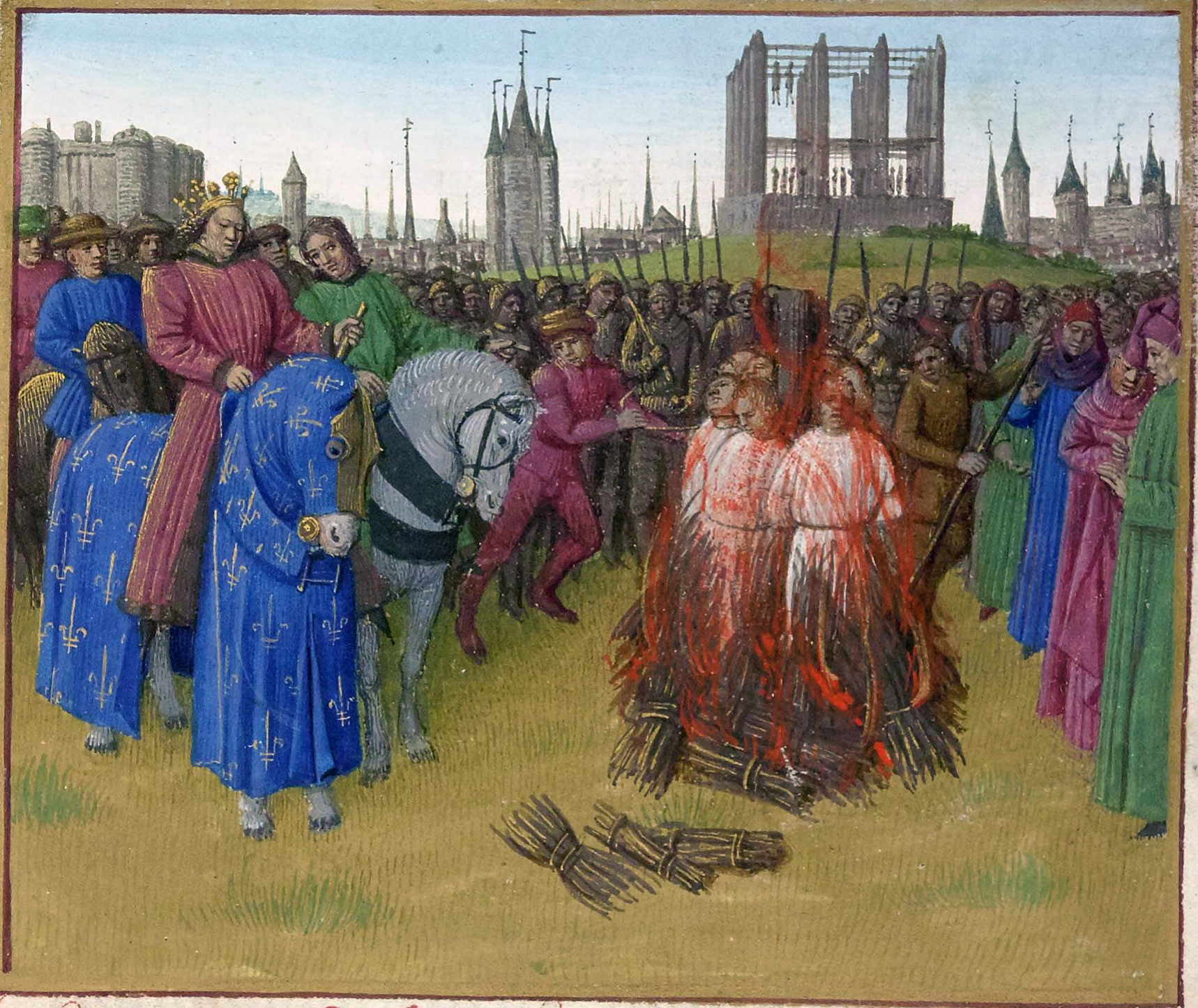
The burning of the Amalricians in 1210, in the presence of King Philip II of France. In the background is the Gibbet of Montfaucon and, anachronistically, the Grosse Tour of the Temple. Illumination from the Grandes Chroniques de France, c. 1255–1260.

The Amalricians were a pantheist movement named after Amalric of Bena. The beliefs are thought to have influenced the Brethren of the Free Spirit.

The beginnings of medieval pantheistic Christian theology lie in the early 13th century, with theologians at Paris, such as David of Dinant, Amalric of Bena, and Ortlieb of Strasbourg, and was later mixed with the millenarist theories of Gioacchino da Fiore.

Fourteen followers of Amalric began to preach that "all things are One, because whatever is, is God". They believed that after the age of the Father (the Patriarchal Age) and the age of the Son (Christianity), a new age of the Holy Spirit was at hand. The Amalricians, who included many priests and clerics, succeeded for some time in propagating their beliefs without being detected by the ecclesiastical authorities.

In 1210, Peter of Nemours, Bishop of Paris, and the Chevalier Guérin, an adviser to the French King Philip II Augustus, obtained secret information from an undercover agent called Master Ralph. The intelligence gathered laid bare the inner workings of the sect, enabling authorities to arrest its principals and proselytes. That same year, a council of bishops and doctors from the University of Paris assembled to take measures for the punishment of the offenders. The ignorant converts, including many women, were pardoned. Of the principals, four were condemned to imprisonment for life. Ten members were burned at the stake.

Almaric was posthumously subjected to the persecution. Besides his being included in the condemnation of his disciples, a special sentence of excommunication was pronounced against him in the council of 1210, and his bones were exhumed from their resting-place and cast into unconsecrated ground. The doctrine was condemned again by Pope Innocent III in the Fourth Lateran Council (1215) "as insanity rather than heresy", and in 1225 Pope Honorius III condemned the work of Johannes Scotus Eriugena, De Divisione Naturæ, from which Amalric was supposed to have derived the beginnings of his heresy.

The movement survived, however, and later followers went even further, arguably evolving into the Brethren of the Free Spirit as well as into its modern continuation, with adherents of so-called "Amalrician Christianity" still claiming to follow in the footsteps of Amalric himself.

== Historical context ==
=== Amalric of Bena ===
Amalric of Bena (c. 1140/1150–1204) (also known as Amalricus de Bena (Latin), Amaury de Bène (French), and Amalric of Chartres) was a French priest and scholar, credited as the founder and inspiration behind the religious group. Little is known about his early life, but it is believed he was born in the village of Bène in the Chartres region. He likely received his education in Chartres and later attended the University of Paris, where he became well-versed in the Seven Liberal Arts (Latin: septem artes liberales). In Paris, he obtained a Magister artium degree, allowing him to teach in the Faculty of Liberal Arts. It is assumed he also received minor holy orders prior to his degree, and that his later studies in theology earned him a master's degree from the University of Paris. It is unclear upon which date he was ordained as a priest.

Amalric was highly regarded as a teacher, especially in the field of logic. His reputation earned him the role of tutor to the eldest son and heir of King Philip II Augustus, who was born in 1187 and later became King Louis VIII. It is possible that Amalric also had a close relationship with the prince himself. However, the exact nature and duration of their connection remains unknown.

Amalric was a controversial figure known for his unconventional thinking and penchant for contradicting his colleagues. Unlike many of his peers, he did not teach in the theology faculty, but in the liberal arts faculty; however, he still engaged in theological discussions in his lessons. He was notorious for challenging traditional beliefs and advocating for bold, outsider perspectives, amassing a significant following of students.

The 13th-century historian Guillelmus Brito documented a dispute that arose during the lifetime of Amalric. The conflict stemmed from Amalric's controversial theological assertions. After a presentation by Guillelmus, Amalric faced opposition from fellow theologians regarding his theses. Despite this, Amalric stood firm in his beliefs, leading to the intervention of Pope Innocent III. Amalric traveled to Rome in an attempt to defend his teachings, but was ultimately met with disapproval from the Pope. Upon his return, Amalric was compelled by the university to recant his beliefs, although he appeared to comply only superficially.

It is said that this defeat greatly affected Amalric, ultimately resulting in his death. However, the credibility of this report is disputed among researchers. Some sources do not mention any involvement of the church magisterium before the death of Almalric, resulting in contradicting reports. An assessment of Ludwig Hödl states that the report by Guillelmus therefore cannot be considered reliable. Alternatively, other academics such as Johannes M. M. H. Thijssen and Paolo Lucentini hold a different perspective, deeming the tradition to be trustworthy and citing this as the earliest documented instance of teaching disputes at the University of Paris. If the event did indeed occur, it likely took place around 1204/1205, with the subsequent condemnation of the "heresy" occurring in 1205/1206, as Amalric died in either 1205 or 1206.

=== The emergence and spread of the Amalrician movement ===
It is unknown whether a cohesive group of individuals who adhered to Amalric's teachings during his lifetime existed. However, following his death, his ideas continued to influence a group of individuals known as the "Amalricians" (also referred to as Amauriani, Beguines, and Papelards) consisting of his students and followers. This group, while composed primarily of clergy and university masters, was not exclusive to educated individuals.

The Amalricians sought to broaden the reach of their ideas beyond the confines of the Latin-speaking world of academia where their teacher had resided. They achieved considerable success in this endeavor by using the French vernacular to convey their doctrine to a wider audience. Their efforts were primarily concentrated in the ecclesiastical province of Sens, which encompassed not only the Archdiocese of Sens, but also the dioceses of Auxerre, Chartres, Meaux, Nevers, Orléans, Paris, Troyes, as well as the dioceses of Amiens and Langres. The movement was propagated by theologians who had received their education in Paris. These theologians went on to become pastors in rural areas and travelling preachers.

Aware of the potential danger associated with their beliefs and practices, the Amalricians had to operate secretly and with caution. Despite this, their movement gained a significant following, particularly among the uneducated. The movement also attracted women to their cause, which was somewhat unusual for the time period. They were often compared to the Beguines and Beghards, another spiritual movement that was seen as a deviation from traditional religious practices.

The Amalricians had a reputation for their strong moral character (vitae gravitas) and leading a life of honor and integrity (honestas). This reputation contributed to the rapid spread of their teachings and ideas. While they did not have a formal hierarchy, there were individuals known as maiores who served as leaders and teachers within the group. These individuals would deliver sermons and spread the message of the Amalricians.

It is uncertain how closely their beliefs aligned with those of their founder. Amalric's teachings were recorded in manuals, such as the sum de doctrina Amalrici, which served as the movement's theoretical foundation. However, it is believed that the Amalricians did not rigidly adhere to these teachings and instead continued to develop and introduce new ideas following Amalric's death. According to Guillelmus Brito, the Amalricians underwent a significant change after the death of Amalric, resulting in the emergence of new and controversial beliefs that were deemed heretical. Brito writes that the heretics "devised new and unheard-of errors and diabolical inventions".

=== Exposure of the movement ===
Two contemporary accounts exist regarding the exposure of Amalrican activities by the church magisterium in the Middle Ages. The first was documented by Guillelmus Brito, while the second, more detailed account can be found in Caesarius von Heisterbach's Dialogus miraculorum (Dialogue about Miracles), written in 1223.

According to Guillelmus, news of the heresy was quietly brought to the attention of the Bishop of Paris, Peter of Nemours (also known as Pierre II de la Chapelle). It was also brought to the attention of Guérin (Garinus), the chancellor of France and an influential advisor to King Philip II. In order to gather further information, the two dignitaries send Radulf von Namur, a skilled master, to secretly infiltrate the Amalricans under the guise of a follower. Described by Guillelmus as a cunning and devout Catholic, Radulf successfully gained the trust of the group and was able to gather incriminating evidence through confidential conversations. Once he had gathered enough information, he reported back to the authorities and the Amalricans were ultimately arrested and brought to Paris.

Caesarius von Heisterbach offers a comparable but more detailed account of the situation. According to his writings, a man named William "the Goldsmith", a follower of the Amalrician movement, approached Rudolf (also known as Radulf) of Namur and falsely claimed to be a messenger from God. The title of 'Goldsmith' was most likely an epithet for William's work in alchemy and not an indication of his profession as a trained theologian. William propagated the belief that a new era of the Holy Spirit had arrived, in which the sacraments of the church were rendered obsolete. He further asserted that he was one of seven chosen men through whom the Holy Spirit would reveal himself. In addition, William attempted to gain the favor of King Philip II by prophesying that in this new age, all empires would come under the rule of the King of France.

Upon questioning, Radulf inquired if William had any fellow believers who shared his supposed beliefs. In response, William revealed that there were indeed many like-minded individuals, naming specific individuals. Upon recognising the potential threat this heresy posed to the church, Radulf reported his encounter with William to the Bishop of Paris and prominent theologians. They then authorised Radulf and another priest to deceive the Amalricians by feigning to be one of them and investigating their doctrine. In doing so, they were promised absolution for their sins.

According to Caesarius' account, Radulf and his fellow priest dutifully followed the instructions issued to them by the Bishop. Along with Amalrican itinerant preachers, they journeyed through the dioceses of Paris, Langres, Troyes and the Archdiocese of Sens, encountering many followers of the movement. In an effort to gain the trust of these individuals, Radulf would occasionally look upwards and feign a spiritual experience, later recounting his supposed visions to the group. The two spies eventually reported their findings to the Bishop of Paris, who then took action and arranged for the heretical teachers to be apprehended.

Fourteen leaders from the Amalrican movement were arrested at various locations. These leaders were known by name and were believed to be predominantly clerics. Of the fourteen, three were masters and seven had received theological training at the university. Upon their arrest, the leaders were immediately questioned about their beliefs and teachings, with notes being taken by Radulf. Rather than taking a violent approach, the church worked closely with theologians from the university to assess and understand the heresy being spread. It is believed that a commission was formed specifically for this purpose, in order to thoroughly and expertly evaluate the situation. The only individuals who were targeted were the maiores, i.e. the educated spokesmen of the Amalrican movement who also happened to be part of the clergy. Guillelmus Brito reports that the bishop of Paris refrained from prosecuting or punishing the women or common people who had been deceived by the maiores.

Evidently the ecclesiastical authorities first became aware of the emerging heresy in late 1209 or early 1210. Following this, the Amalricans were closely monitored for several months in order to gather evidence against them. Their eventual arrest likely occurred in May or June 1210. Due to their status as clerics, the distribution of powers between state and church required a degree of sensitivity in regards to taking action against them.

King Philip II of France issued a decree in May 1210, which is believed to be linked to the imprisonment of the Amalricans. This decree outlined the protocols that state authorities should follow in cases where crimes were committed by members of the clergy. It emphasised that those crimes fell under the jurisdiction of the Church and that the individuals should be handed over to its authority.

=== Condemnation and execution of members ===
The trial of the Amalricans is of particular historical significance in the development of canon law. It marked the first documented instance of implementing the new procedures introduced by Pope Innocent III for the inquisition process. Pope Innocent III had established guidelines for conducting trials for heresy in papal decretals, which were later included in the Church's legal code of 1210 in the "third collection" of canon law known as the Collectio tertia. Trials for heretics were conducted in church, granting the judges considerable authority in determining the facts of the case. This included the ability to conduct interrogations, question witnesses, and seek guidance from a panel of theologians as needed.

A preserved fragment of trial files offers insight into interrogation practices used during this period. The document contains confessions of four individuals who were questioned in court. The indictment, known as the cedula, listed the articles of accusation and was read to the accused individual in the presence of the bishop. The "errors" or heretical beliefs that the individual was accused of spreading were also stated. The accused was given a chance to confirm that they had understood the accusations and could either deny them or plead guilty. All four defendants admitted their mistake and guilt, with one claiming partial understanding of the accusation. It is noted that torture was not used in obtaining these confessions, as the defendants gave information willingly. According to sources, some members of the Amalrican group did not deny the crime but instead defended their heretical beliefs. For example, one defendant, named Bernhard, claimed that as a divine being (in quantum erat), he could neither be burned nor harmed by torture as he saw himself as God. With this, Bernhard was referring to the belief that divine authority can be found within humans, which makes up the essence of the person and remains unchanged by the vicissitudes of fate.

A verdict was reached following a thorough evidentiary process. As the defendants were clerics, the decision could not be made by the Paris bishop alone. According to canon law regulations, a provincial synod of the responsible ecclesiastical province had to approve the condemnation. In the case of a defendant who was a priest, the participation of at least six bishops was required. As a result, the matter was referred to a synod meeting in Paris under the direction of the Archbishop of Sens, Peter of Corbeil. During this time, the Diocese of Paris fell under the jurisdiction of the ecclesiastical province of Sens. It is possible that the synod was specifically convened for the purpose of condemning the Amalricans, and it likely took place in September or October 1210. Along with the archbishop, the assembly consisted of the bishops of Paris (Pierre II de la Chapelle), Orléans (Manassé de Seignelay), Troyes (Hervée de Troyes), Nevers (Guillaume I de Saint-Lazare), Meaux (Geoffroi de Tressy), Chartres (Renaud de Bar), and Auxerre (Guillaume de Seignelay). Representatives from the University of Paris, including masters of theology, were also in attendance. While all members of the assembly were present as advisors, only the archbishop held the role of judge. Due to the gathered confessions and the open profession of heretical beliefs by some Amalricans, the guilty verdict was inevitable – leaving no doubt that the crime committed was indeed heresy and required condemnation.
