= Ortlieb of Strasbourg =

Pantheist theologian

Ortlieb of Stasbourg
- Born: Second half of the 12th century
- Died: early 13th century
- Other names: Ordevus, Orclenus, Ortlevus, Ortlibus
- Occupations: Theologian, Philosopher, Teacher, Mystic
- Organization: Orlibarii pantheistic sect
- Opponents: Albertus Magnus; Pope Innocentius III.

Ortlieb of Strasbourg (also spelled Ordevus, Orclenus, Ortlevus and Ortlibus) was a theologian in the early 13th century who lived in Strasbourg. He was the founder of a pantheistic movement, whose followers called themselves the Ortlibarii (or Ortliebers, Ortliebiens, Ortliebians, Ortlibenses, Ortibenses, Ordibarii). His teachings were condemned by Pope Innocent III in c. 1216. His followers were mentioned in 1239 in an anti-heresy law of Frederick II, Holy Roman Emperor, and in 1254 in a papal bull.

The main resource for detail on Ortlieb is Albertus Magnus's Determinatio (1273). The only statement traditionally attributed to him is "A man ought to give up all externals and follow the leadings of the Spirit within himself." He taught a pantheistic union of man with God and the eternity of existence, contrary to the creationist dogma of the church. By ''giving up externals" he meant that the inner authority of the Spirit was much more important than church hierarchy, sacraments and so forth.

There are suggestions that similarities have been detected between the teaching and practices of Ortliebarii and the Waldensians, the Cathari and the Amalrcians. Rufus M. Jones suggests that Ortlieb was Amalrician and a disciple of Amalric of Bena.
