= John Linnell (cabinet maker) =

Cabinet maker (1729–1796)

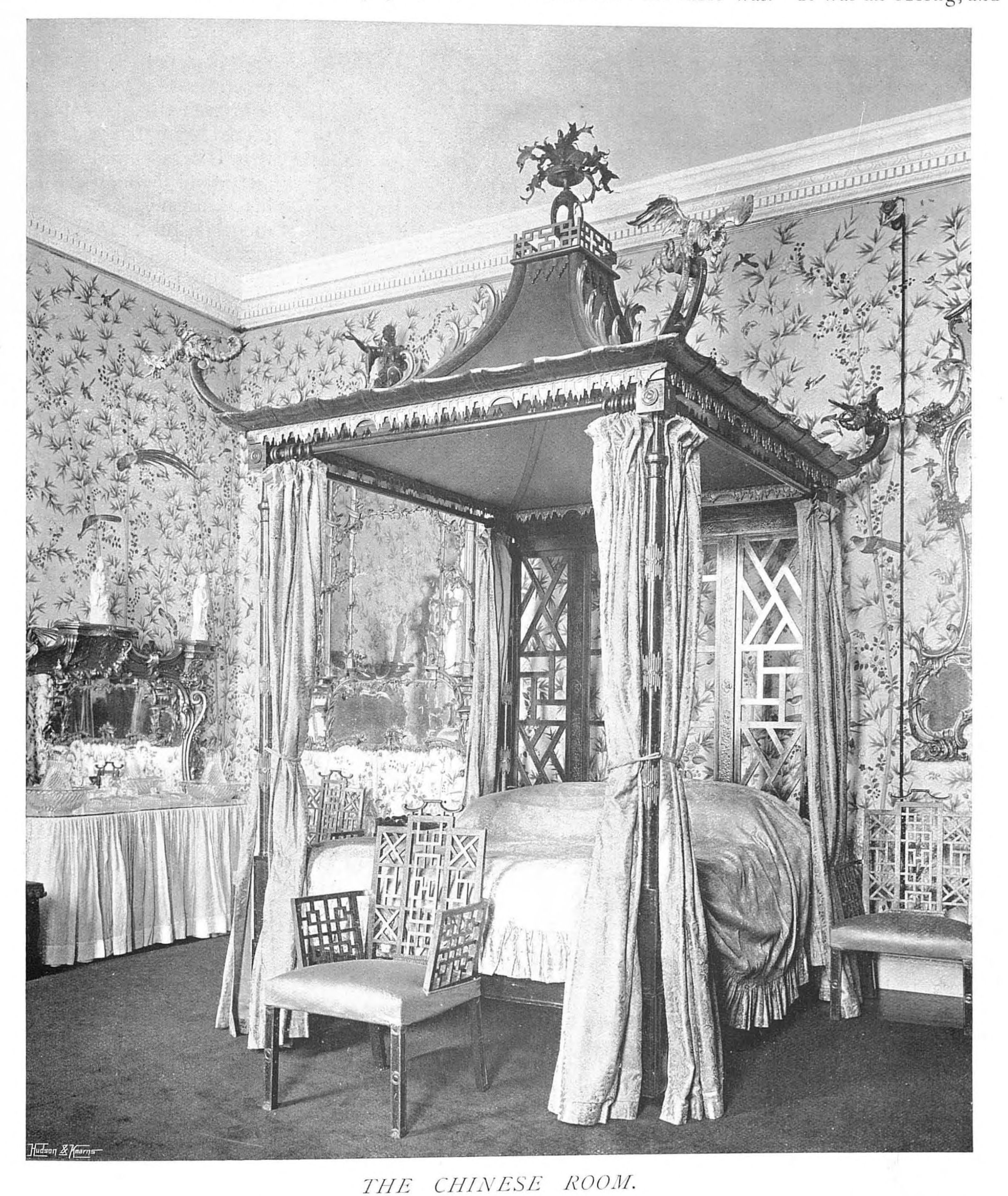
The Chinese Bedroom at Badminton House

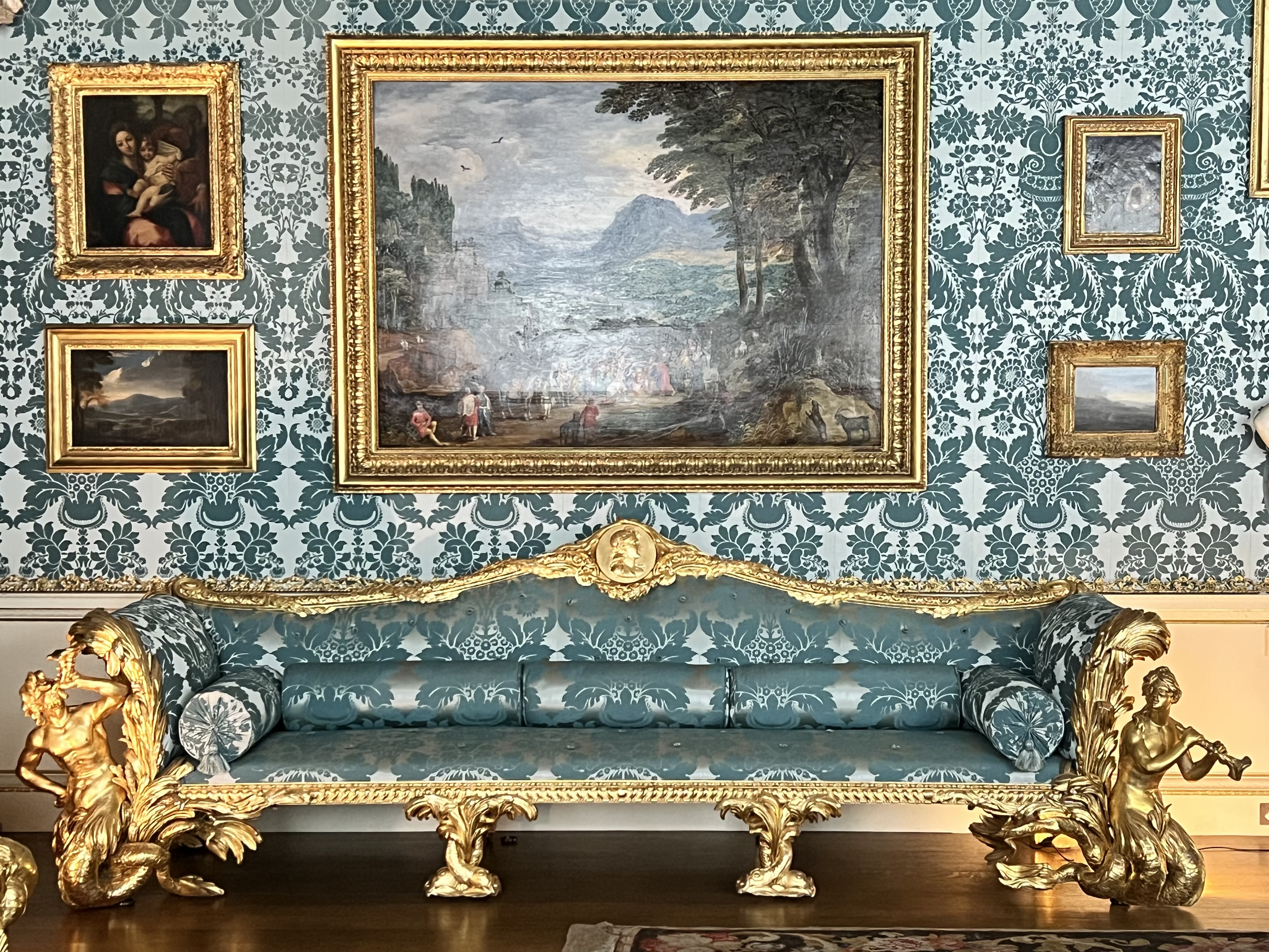
Settee at Kedleston Hall is dated from around 1765.

John Linnell (1729–1796) was a British 18th-century cabinet-maker and designer. He was in charge of one of the largest cabinet making-firms when he inherited The Linnell firm in 1763. Linnell designed works like the state coach for George III and was involved in making the Dury Lane theatre.

== Biography ==
Linnell was in charge of one of London's largest cabinet-makers firms of the 18th century with many important and prominent patrons. The Linnell firm was created in 1730 by William Linnell (c. 1703–63), and was inherited by his son John Linnell in 1763. The firm moved from 8 Long Acre in St. Martin's Lane, London to 28 Berkeley Square in 1750. From 1763 to his death, John Linnell continued to develop the business his father had established and his reputation grew. However, due to his unconventional lifestyle, he left no heir to his trade and the fate of the firm after his death is uncertain.

There is speculation that, in the last years of his life, John Linnell entered a partnership with his relative Thomas Tatham (1763–1817). However, the evidence is not conclusive. Thomas Tatham went on to be a partner at one of London's fashionable cabinetmaking and upholstery businesses with George Elward, Edward Bailey and Richard Saunders. They were principal cabinet-makers to George IV and this firm worked at Carlton House and Buckingham Palace.

Thomas Tatham and his brother Charles Heathcote Tatham were trained in drawing and design by John Linnell. Linnell introduced C. H. Tatham to Henry Holland who later funded his educational trip to Rome. In 1796, when C. H. Tatham learned of Linnell's death, he was in Rome and wrote to Henry Holland, who had his home in Sloane Ave, Knightsbridge – that he was deeply upset by John Linnell's death. Upon his return to London he compiled a selection of 355 of John Linnell's drawings and designs, which his brother Thomas Tatham had inherited. These drawings now survive at the V&A.

=== Patrons ===
One of John Linnell's first jobs as a designer in his father's firm was for a suite of furniture for Charles Somerset, 4th Duke of Beaufort's Chinese Bedroom at Badminton House.

John Linnell was also commissioned by Nathaniel Curzon, 1st Baron Scarsdale at Kedleston Hall, Derbyshire. Linnell delivered furniture from c. 1760.

Another important patron was the banker Robert Child. Osterley Park House, Middlesex remains very much as it did in the eighteenth century, when John Linnell supplied furniture for the Childs. Robert Adam was the architect there.

Hugh Percy, 1st Duke of Northumberland and his wife Elizabeth Percy, Duchess of Northumberland were also among Linnell's patrons, and several armchairs attributed to Linnell can be seen at Alnwick Castle, one of their residences in the eighteenth century.

=== Design for the State Coach of George III ===
John Linnell submitted designs for the State Coach of George III. Several designs were submitted for this important commission. It is thought that the architect Robert Adam also submitted designs. It was the King's architect William Chambers, who produced the final design.

=== Drury Lane Theatre ===
John Linnell was also involved in the design of the Drury Lane theatre. He produced the designs for the boxes – these survive at the V&A.
