= Michael Spang =

Michael Spang may refer to:

- Michael Grundt Spang (1931–2003), Norwegian journalist, crime reporter and crime fiction writer
- Michael Henry Spang (died 1762), Danish artist and sculptor
