= Kedleston =

Village in Derbyshire, England

Coordinates: 52°58′00″N 01°32′50″W

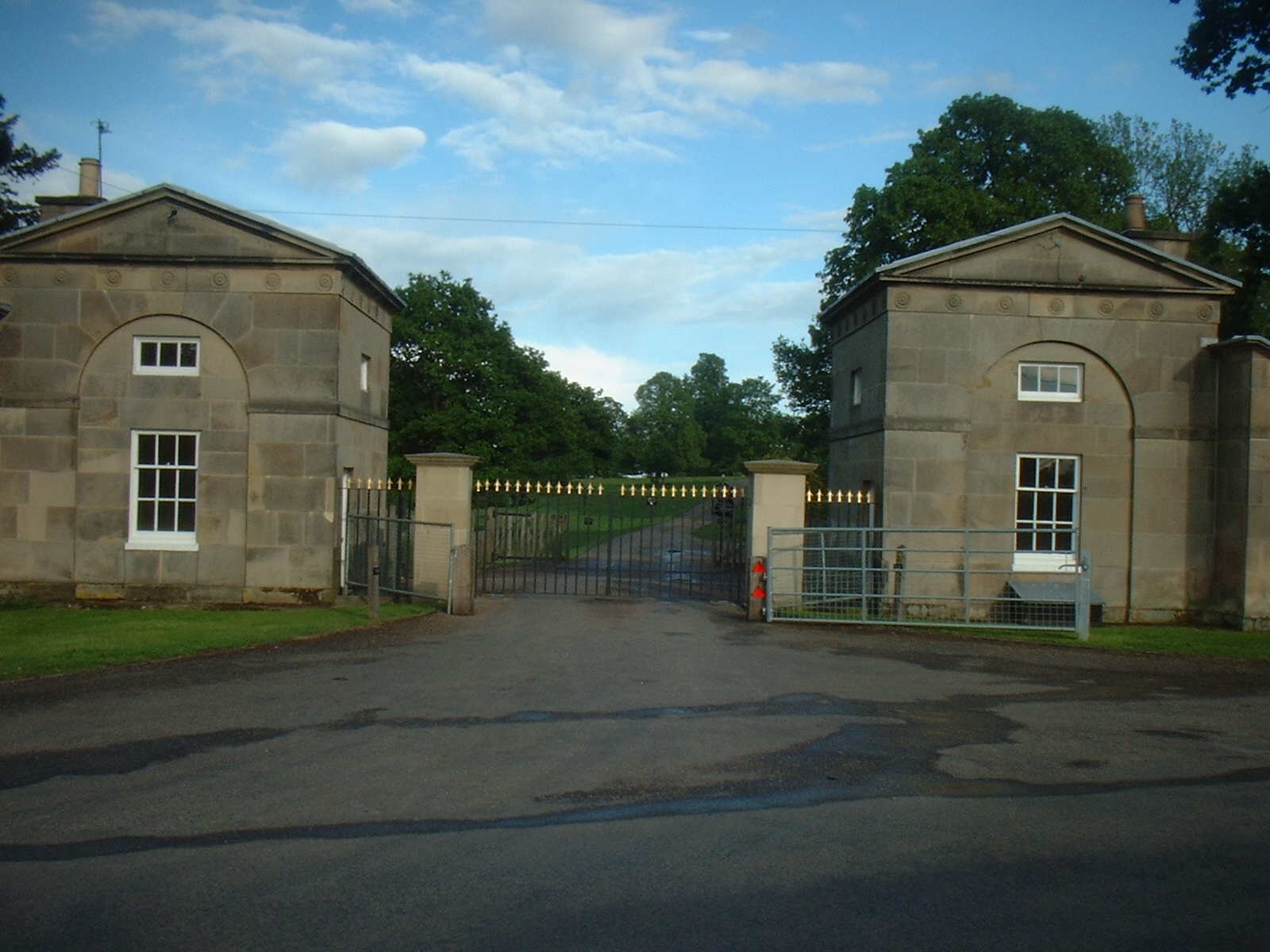
- Kedleston Hall

- Location within Derbyshire
- OS grid reference: SK311403
- District: Amber Valley
- Shire county: Derbyshire
- Region: East Midlands
- Country: England
- Sovereign state: United Kingdom
- Post town: DERBY
- Postcode district: DE22
- Police: Derbyshire
- Fire: Derbyshire
- Ambulance: East Midlands
- UK Parliament: Mid Derbyshire

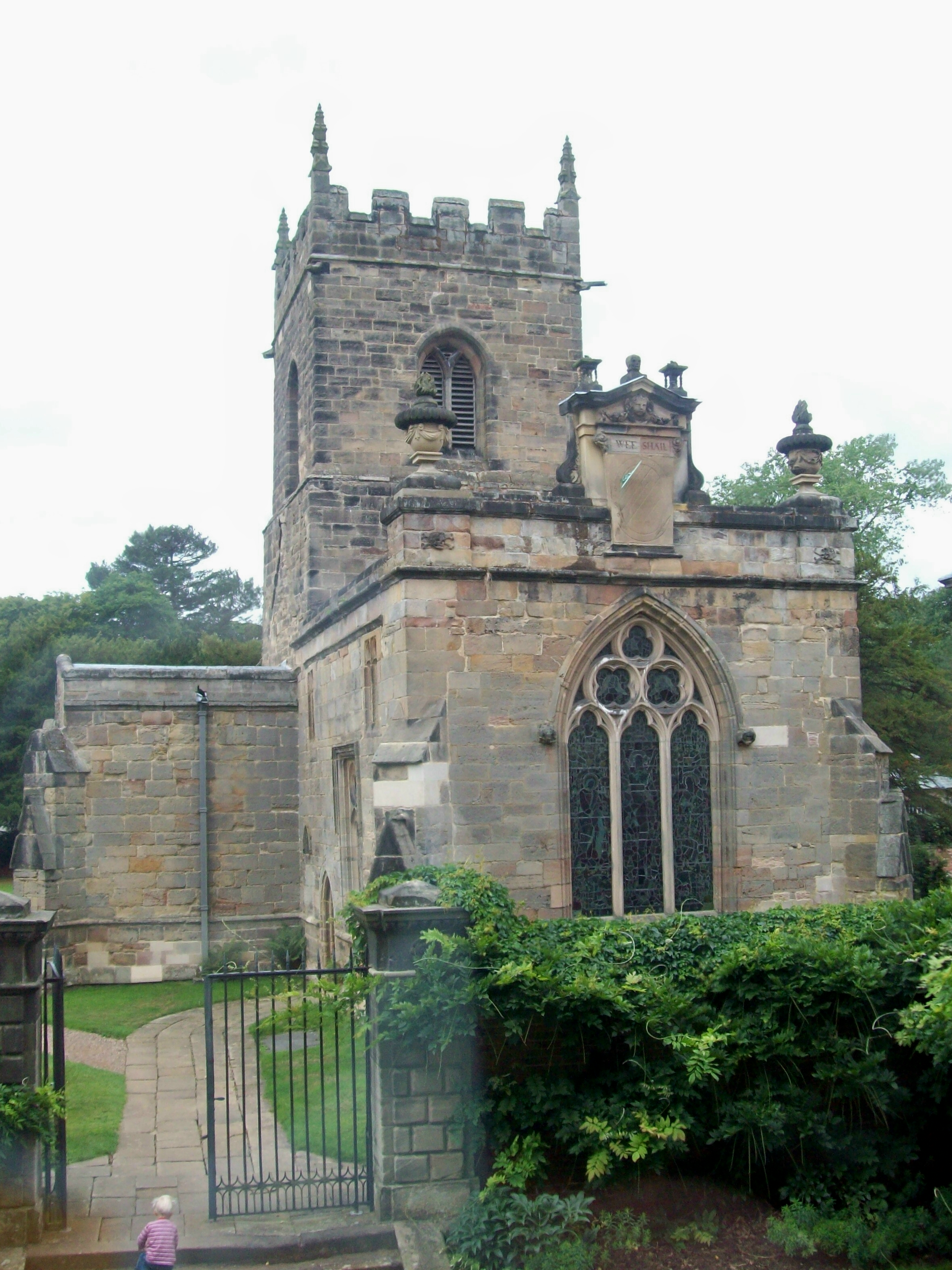
All Saints' Church is the only surviving building from the original village.

Pronounced
(listen)

Kedleston is a village and civil parish in the Amber Valley district of Derbyshire, approximately 4 miles (6.4 km) north-west of Derby. Nearby places include Quarndon, Weston Underwood, Mugginton and Kirk Langley. The population at the 2011 Census was less than 100. Details are included in the civil parish of Mackworth, Amber Valley.

== History ==
Kedleston was mentioned in the Domesday Book as belonging to Henry de Ferrers and having a mill. It was valued at 20 shillings.

The name of the village derives from Ketel’s tūn, the homestead belonging to Ketel, from the Old Norse Ketill

The medieval village was demolished by the Curzons to build Kedleston Hall, the historic residence of the Curzon family now run by the National Trust. The parish Church adjacent to the hall All Saints is all that remains of the original village and is in the care of the Churches Conservation Trust.

== Notable residents ==
- Robert of Courçon (1160/1170 – 1219), English cardinal.
- Sir John Curzon, 1st Baronet (1598–1686), of Kedleston Hall, politician, MP and landowner
- Thomas Middleton (1769–1822), a noted Anglican bishop, Bishop of Calcutta.
- Samuel Renn (1786–1845), organ builder who ran a business in Stockport, his father was employed at Kedleston Hall.
- George Curzon, 1st Marquess Curzon of Kedleston (1859–1925), Viceroy of India and Foreign Secretary.
- Lady Cynthia Mosley (1898–1933), of Kedleston Hall, aristocrat, politician, MP and the first wife of Sir Oswald Mosley.

== See also ==
- Listed buildings in Kedleston
