= Davidist =

The term Davidist may refer to:

- Followers of David of Dinant, a pantheistic philosopher
- Followers of David Joris, an Anabaptist leader
- Followers of Ferenc Dávid, also known as Francis David, a Transylvanian Nontrinitarian
