= All Saints Church, Kedleston =

Coordinates: 52.9592°N 1.5367°W

All Saints' Church, Kedleston
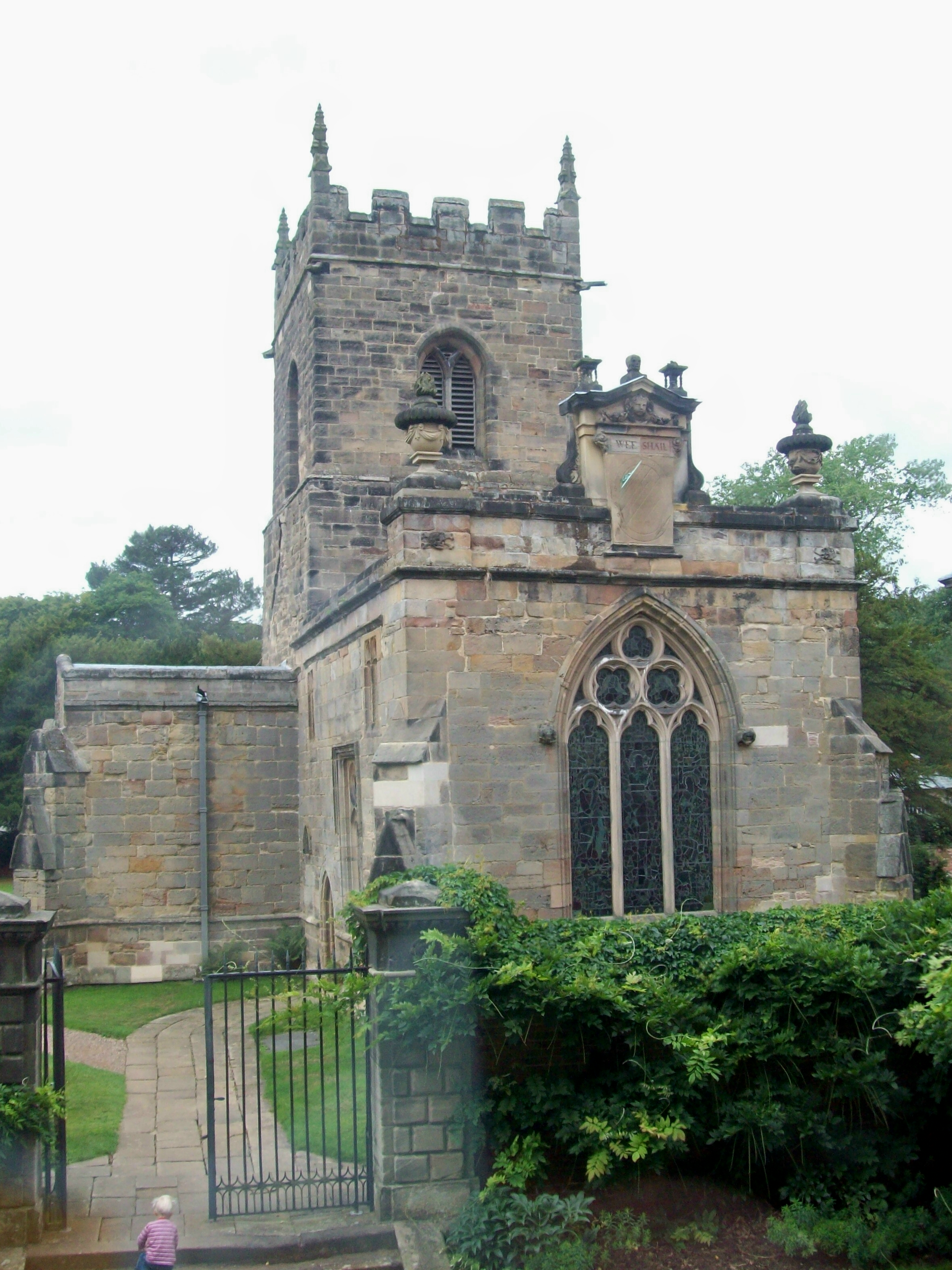
- All Saints' Church, Kedleston, from the east

- Location in Derbyshire
- OS grid reference: SK 312 403
- Location: Adjacent to Kedleston Hall, Derbyshire
- Country: England
- Denomination: Anglican
- Website: Churches Conservation Trust

History
- Dedication: All Saints

Architecture
- Functional status: Redundant
- Heritage designation: Grade I
- Designated: 13 February 1967
- Architectural type: Church
- Style: Norman, Gothic
- Groundbreaking: 12th century
- Completed: 1908

Specifications
- Materials: Sandstone, Welsh slate roofs

All Saints' Church, Kedleston, is a redundant Anglican Church located 4 miles north-west of Derby in Derbyshire, England. It is all that remains of the medieval village of Kedleston, which was demolished in 1759 by Nathaniel Curzon to make way for the adjacent Kedleston Hall, a country house in Derbyshire, England. It is recorded in the National Heritage List for England as a designated Grade I listed building. Kedleston Hall is owned by the National Trust, and the church is under the care of the Churches Conservation Trust. Kedleston Hall has been occupied by the Curzon family for over 700 years.

== History ==
The settlement of Kedleston was recorded in the Domesday Book, and the first mention of a church here was in 1198–99. The only remaining part of that church is the Norman south doorway and the adjoining wall. The greater part of the present church dates from rebuilding in the 13th century. At some time between 1480 and 1510, the top of the tower was rebuilt in Perpendicular style. Between 1700 and 1720, decorative features, including vases and a sundial, were added to the east face.

In 1759 building of the present hall started. The area occupied by the village of Kedleston was replaced by parkland. In 1884–85 John Oldrid Scott carried out a major restoration. This included raising the level of the roof line, installing a new timber ceiling, adding a new west window in Decorated style, laying a new floor, and removing the box pews from the nave. In 1908, Lord George Curzon added the Kedleston Chapel to the north of the nave over a burial vault. This was a memorial to his wife, Mary, and was designed by G. F. Bodley.

In 1910–12 the stained glass in the windows was replaced and additions were made to it. The church was declared redundant on 1 April 1983, and was vested in the Churches Conservation Trust on 18 April 1989. There are currently two custodians at this site who are in charge of caring and protecting the church during its opening hours.

== Architecture ==
=== Exterior ===
The church is constructed in sandstone with Welsh slate roofs. Its plan is cruciform, with a central tower over a crossing, a nave with a north chapel (the Kedleston Chapel), north and south transepts, a chancel with a clerestory, and a north vestry. The south doorway is Norman in style, having a round-headed arch decorated with a zigzag pattern, enclosing a tympanum with weathered carvings of beasts. To the right of the doorway are two two-light windows with flat arches. Each transept is buttressed and has a window consisting of three stepped lancets.

In the south wall of the chancel is a priest's door, with a lancet window on the left, and a two-light window under a flat arch to the right. In the clerestory are two-light windows in both the south and the north walls. The east wall has diagonal buttresses and a three-light window. Along the top is a parapet, in the centre of which is a sundial. This is inscribed with the words "We shall", and skulls and crossbones; on its summit are hourglasses. At the ends of the parapet are urn finials. In the north wall of the chancel is a two-light window, and the north wall of the vestry has two paired lancet windows. The Kedleston Chapel has three bays separated by buttresses. In each bay is a three-light window under which are three trefoils acting as ventilators.

Along the parapet is the inscription "QUIA MULTUM AMAVIT". The west wall has diagonal buttresses and a three-light window. Above this is a lancet window in the gable. The tower is in two stages. In the lower stage are two lancet windows, and in the upper stage are two-light bell openings on each side. The summit has a battlemented parapet, with crocketted pinnacles at the corners.

=== Interior ===
Between the nave and the Kedleston Chapel to its north is a three-bay arcade. There is an aumbry recess and a piscina in the chancel, and another piscina in the south transept. The north transept contains the organ. The font dates from the 18th century and consists of a circular bowl on a polygonal shaft; it has a wooden cover. The wooden pulpit is from the 19th century, and the brass lectern in the shape of an eagle dates from 1886. In the chancel are box pews. The altar is Jacobean in style. In the arcade is a wrought iron screen with gates. The church contains light fittings and a corona lucis, also in wrought iron, and five hatchments.

The stained glass in one of the windows in the chancel dates from the 17th century, and was moved into the church in 1910. The other stained glass dates from the late 19th and early 20th century. The two-manual organ was built in 1899 by W. Hill and Son of London, and rebuilt and enlarged by the same firm in 1910.

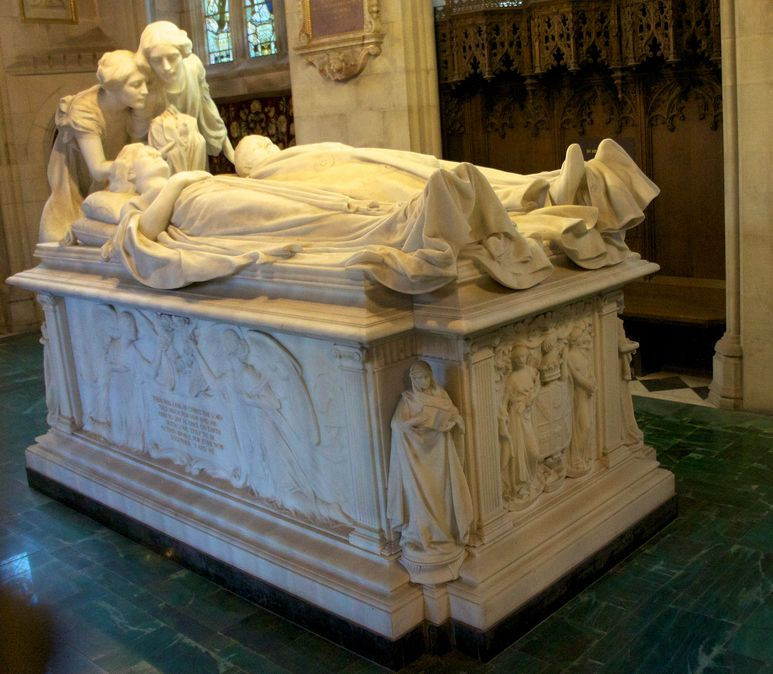
Tomb of the Marquess Curzon of Kedleston and his wife Mary in the Kedleston Chapel

In the church are 35 monuments to the Curzon family; these include free-standing tombs, wall monuments and floor tablets. They date from the 13th to the 20th centuries. The largest is a free-standing tomb in the Kedleston Chapel. It bears the effigies of the 1st Marquess Curzon of Kedleston, who died in 1925, and his first wife Mary, for whom the chapel was built and who died in 1906 at the age of 36. It is a table tomb in white marble; two angels holding the crown of life lean over the effigies. The memorial was designed by Sir Bertram Mackennal.

In the south transept there is a tomb chest with the effigies of Sir John Curzon and his wife, dating from 1456. Sir John is dressed in armour, at the feet of the effigies are dogs, and on the sides of the tomb are the figures of their 17 children. Also in the transept is a plain slab decorated with a cross and foliage to the memory of Thomas de Curzon, who died in 1245. There are wall memorials to Sir John Curzon, 1st Baronet, who died in 1686, and his wife, Patience, who died in 1642 and to Sir John Curzon, 3rd Baronet who died unmarried in 1727.

There are more memorials in the north transept. One is designed by Peter Scheemakers to the memory of Sir Nathaniel Curzon, 2nd Baronet, who died in 1719, and his wife Sarah. A further memorial is to Sir Nathaniel Curzon, 4th Baronet and his family dated 1758, made by Michael Rysbrack to a design by Robert Adam.

== External features ==
The churchyard contains the war graves of a Derbyshire Yeomanry officer (a member of the Curzon family), and a Pioneer Corps soldier of World War II.

== See also ==
- Grade I listed churches in Derbyshire
- Grade I listed buildings in Derbyshire
- Listed buildings in Kedleston
- List of churches preserved by the Churches Conservation Trust in the English Midlands
