= Guillaume de Seignelay =

Roman Catholic bishop (died 1223)

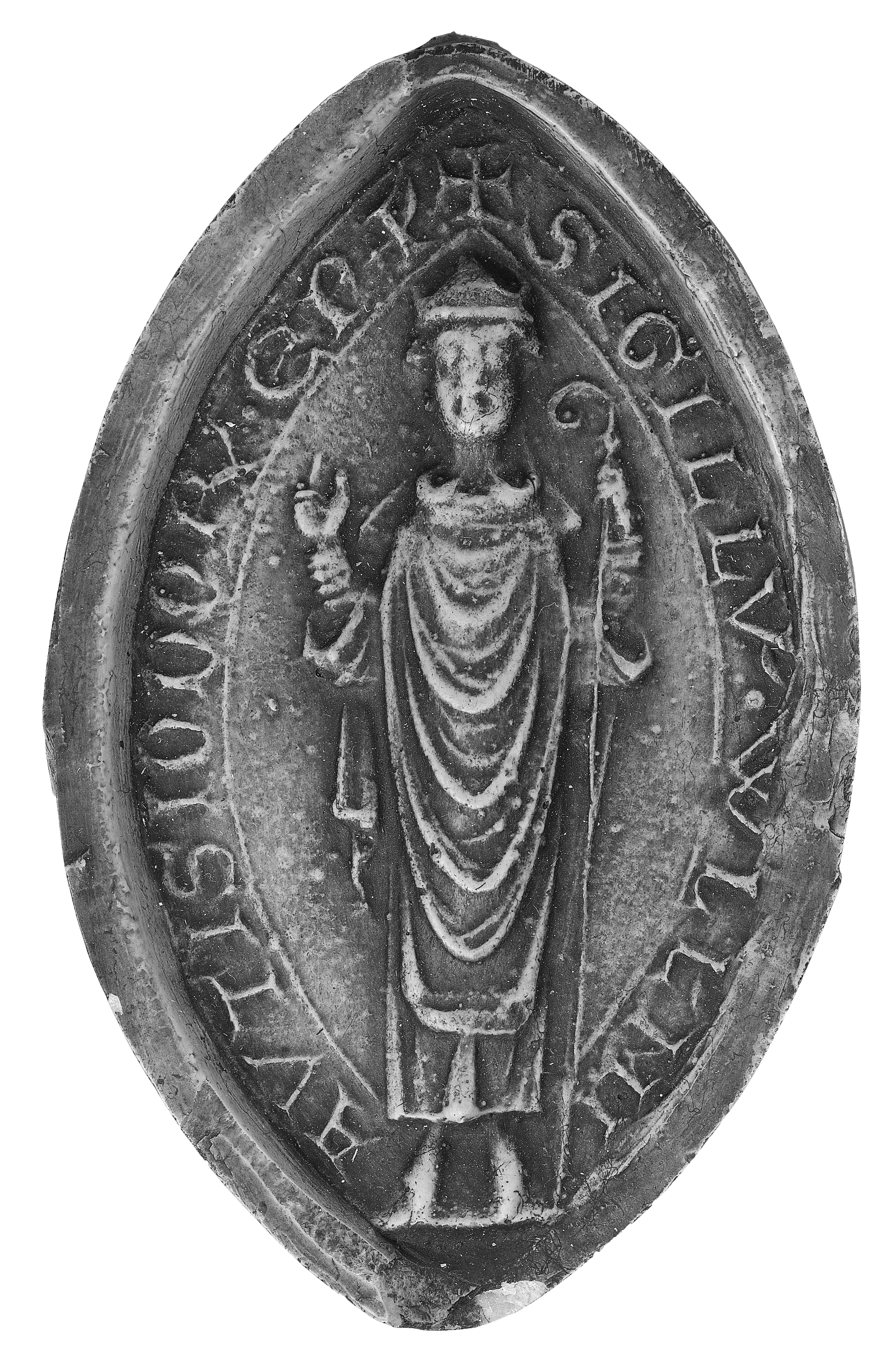
- Guillaume's sigil

Personal details
- Died: 1223
- Parents: Bouchard de Seignelay; Aanor de Montbard

Bishop of Auxerre
- In office 1207–1220
- Preceded by: Hugues de Noyers
- Succeeded by: Henri de Villeneuve

Bishop of Paris
- In office 1220–1223
- Preceded by: Pierre de La Chapelle
- Succeeded by: Barthélmy

Guillaume de Seignelay (died 1223) was Bishop of Auxerre from 1207 to 1220 and then Bishop of Paris from 1220 until his death.

== Life ==
He was the son of Bouchard de Seignelay, a family of lords of Seignelay, and Aanor de Montbard, a relative of Bernard of Clairvaux. His brother was Manassas de Seignelay, Bishop of Orleans. Guillaume was elected as bishop of Auxerre in 1207.

During his tenure he came into conflict with Philip II. This happened because in 1210 Philip asked the french bishops to follow him in his campaign into Brittany. Guillaume and his brother marched to Mantes but not finding the king, retreated. In response, Philip confiscated their holdings, while the two bishops placed those territories under interdict. After the arbitration of Innocent III, in 1212 the properties were restored to the bishops and they were exonerated from military duties.

Guillaume also participated in the Albigensian Crusade with his brother, leading their troops to Carcassonne with Simon de Montfort.

In 1220 he was elected bishop of Paris by Honorius III. Actually, at first, Aldobrandino Cajetan was elected, but he refused, preferring to be bishop of Sabina. Later, Gauthier Cornu was proposed, but didn't receive papal approvation. This led to Guillaume's election to the post, despite his own protests.

In this new post, Guillaume came again into conflict with Philip. This was caused by his affirmation of the temporal rights of the bishops of Paris over the city. This turned out favourably for Guillaume, who managed to receive an annual income from the king. Beside the king, he also entered into conflict with the University of Paris, having to imprison and execommunicate both students and professors due to their supposed opposition to the bishop, the chancellor and the king. Pope Honorius, however, decreed in 1222 to free the imprisoned and asked the bishop not to molest those who had a license to teach.

Guillaume was present at the funeral of Philip II in 1223, before dying himself the same year, on the 23th of November.

Catholic Church titles
Preceded by Hugues de Noyers	Bishop of Auxerre; 1207 - 1220	Succeeded by Henri de Villeneuve
Preceded by Pierre de La Chapelle	Bishop of Paris; 1220 - 1223	Succeeded by Barthélmy
