= Listed buildings in Kedleston =

Kedleston is a civil parish in the Amber Valley district of Derbyshire, England. The parish contains 19 listed buildings that are recorded in the National Heritage List for England. Of these, four are listed at Grade I, the highest of the three grades, eight are at Grade II*, the middle grade, and the others are at Grade II, the lowest grade. The parish contains the village of Kedleston and the surrounding area. The major building in the parish is Kedleston Hall, which is listed together with associated structures, including a church, and buildings in the gardens and surrounding park. The listed buildings outside the park are a rectory, a smithy converted into a private house, and a milepost.

== Key ==
Grade	Criteria
I	Buildings of exceptional interest, sometimes considered to be internationally important
II*	Particularly important buildings of more than special interest
II	Buildings of national importance and special interest

== Buildings ==
Name and location	Photograph	Date	Notes	Grade
All Saints Church; 52.95926°N 1.53664°W		12th century	The church has been altered and extended during the centuries, most of it dating from the late 13th century, it was restored in 1884–85 by John Oldrid Scott, and the north aisle, designed by G. F. Bodley, was added between 1907 and 1913. The church is built in sandstone with Welsh slate roofs, and has a cruciform plan, consisting of a nave, a north aisle, north and south transepts, a chancel with a clerestory and a north vestry, and a tower over the crossing. The tower has a chamfered string course, two-light bell openings with Y-tracery and an embattled parapet with corner crocketed pinnacles. The south doorway dates from the 12th century, and has a round arch with a zigzag, and traces of carved beasts in the tympanum. At the east end is a parapet containing a pedimented sundial with a cherub's head, an inscription, and vase finials. At the ends of the parapet are piers, each with a skull and crossbones, and surmounted by an urn.	I
Kedleston Hall; 52.95918°N 1.53588°W		1758–65	A large country house designed by Matthew Brettingham, James Paine, and Robert Adam in Georgian style. It is built in red brick faced in stone and render, and has hipped Welsh slate roofs. The house consists of a main rectangular block, linked by quadrant colonnades to rectangular pavilions. The basement, piano nobile and the attic storeys are rusticated. The north front of the main block has eleven bays and a central portico with six giant Corinthian columns over a basement of five arches, and on the pediment are three statues. On the front is a double staircase, and the windows are sashes, those in the ground floor with pediments. The colonnades have five bays, and each pavilion has five bays, and a pediment on four Ionic columns. The south front has nine bays, the middle three bays projecting with four Corinthian columns, and is approached by curving double stairways. In the ground floor are niches with statues, and above is a frieze of swags and medallions. Above is an entablature with statues, and a shallow lead dome. On the east and west fronts are Venetian windows.	I
The North Lodge; 52.96743°N 1.52254°W		1760–61	The lodge at the entrance to the drive to Kedleston Hall was designed by Robert Adam. It is in red brick, faced in stone, and has a Welsh slate roof, and has a north face with three bays, consisting of a tall carriage arch flanked by pavilions. The lodge is in Roman Doric style, with fluted columns, a triglyph frieze and a pediment containing a coat of arms. The arch has a moulded and fluted impost band continuing as a cornice over the pavilions. In the pavilions are sash windows, and the elaborate gates are in wrought iron.	I
The Hermitage; 52.96096°N 1.54508°W		1761	The Hermitage is in the form of a rustic temple, and is in red brick, sandstone, and a crystalline white stone, and has a thatched roof. The building is about 10 feet (3.0 m) high and has a circular plan about 7 feet (2.1 m) in diameter. It contains a round-arched doorway and two square window openings.	II
The Sulphur Bath; 52.96123°N 1.52784°W		c. 1761	The bath house is in rendered red brick, with a moulded cornice, and a Welsh slate roof. There is a single storey and a symmetrical front of three bays. The central bay is open and has paired columns, the capitals with foliage and egg and dart decoration, and it contains iron railings. The outer bays form pedimented pavilions, each containing a blind round arch and an entablature. In the sides and in the outer bays at the rear are blind arches with a Diocletian window at the top, and at the rear the central bay contains an apse.	II*
The Lion's Mouth; 52.96138°N 1.53691°W		c. 1763	A well head in the grounds of Kedleston Hall, it is in sandstone, and consists of a low structure set in a hollow. It has a square plan, and on one side is a vermiculated round arch enclosing a lion's mouth spouting water into a semicircular pool. The structure has a low gabled roof with dentil, egg and dart, and icicle motifs.	II
The Stables; 52.95942°N 1.53785°W		1767–69	The stables associated with Kedleston Hall were designed by Samuel Wyatt. They are in red brick with sandstone dressings on a stone plinth, with a moulded eaves cornice and a roof of Welsh slate and tile. There are two storeys, the main range has an L-shaped plan, and with a further range it encloses a courtyard. The north front has 13 bays, the middle seven bays recessed, each bay containing a round arch with an impost band and a Diocletian window above. The outer three bays project as pavilions under pediments, with doorways in the ground floor, and a large Diocletian window and impost band above flanked by circular windows in moulded square surrounds. At the east end is an archway linked to a single-storey pavilion. The east front has six bays and similar windows, and the further range contains six coach houses.	II*
The Boathouse; 52.96365°N 1.53836°W		c. 1770	The boathouse with a fishing room above is in the grounds of Kedleston Hall, and was designed by Robert Adam. It is in stone, and has a Welsh slate roof with coped gables. On the side facing the lake, the central part has two storeys and is flanked by single-storey boathouses with shallow pediments. The basement is rusticated, and each part has a semicircular arch with a keystone, the outer arches are open, and the middle arch contains a sash window. The parts are joined by a recessed link containing a window and a panel with swags. Above all the arches is a fluted frieze with medallions and a cornice]. In the centre part is a Venetian window with a sill balustrade, and a moulded impost band, and at the top is an open pediment. In the centre of the front facing the park is a niche with a half-dome containing a doorway with a moulded architrave, and a moulded arch on Tuscan Doric pilasters. This is flanked by sash windows and pilasters, and above is a fluted frieze and a dentilled and moulded cornice, two roundels, and a pediment containing a roundel, a crest and swags.	I
The Old Rectory and stable block 52.96605°N 1.54763°W	—	1771	The rectory, which was designed by Samuel Wyatt, is in red brick with stone dressings, on a plinth, with a moulded eaves cornice, and a hipped Welsh slate roof. There are two storeys and a basement, and a front of three bays under a pediment containing a bull's eye window. In the middle bay is a blind recessed arch with an impost band continuing as a sill band. The windows are sashes, in the ground floor with architraves, the middle window also with consoles and a balustrade, and the upper floor windows with incised lintels. The east front has three bays and contains a Venetian-style doorway with fluted pilasters and a triangular pediment on consoles. The lower stable range to the west has a tile roof, and contains a round-arched doorway flanked by lunette windows.	II*
The Summer House; 52.95828°N 1.53794°W		1772	The summer house in the garden of Kedleston Hall was designed by James Wyatt. It is in sandstone with a moulded sill band, and a domed lead roof with an urn finial. There is a hexagonal plan, and at the angles are pilasters with leaf capitals, and an entablature with flower roundels and urns with swags. Four semicircular steps lead up to double doors with a moulded surround, in four of the other sides are sash windows with moulded surrounds, and the rear wall is blank.	II*
The South Lodges; 52.96710°N 1.54673°W		c. 1775 (probable)	The lodges form a pair of mirror-image pavilions linked by railings and gate piers. Each pavilion has a recessed round arch with an impost band containing a sash window and a small window above, over which is a rosette frieze and a pedimented gable. On the outside is a lean-to bay with a blind window, an impost band, and a moulded cornice. Between the pavilions are square gate piers with moulded caps, and iron railings and gates.	II*
Lion statue 52.95860°N 1.53741°W		1770s	The statue in the grounds of Kedleston Hall is based on the statues of the Medici lions. It is in stone, the pedestal designed by Samuel Wyatt and the lion is by Joseph Wilton. The pedestal has a moulded plinth, sunk panels with circular garlands on the long sides, and a dentilled cornice. The lion is standing with a forepaw raised and placed on a ball.	II*
Monument to Michael Drayton; 52.95857°N 1.53761°W		1770s	The monument is to the memory of Michael Drayton, and is in stone. It is elaborately carved and consists of a vase on an pedestal. The pedestal has curved sides and swags, and on it is a large urn with a fluted underside and a foliage frieze.	II*
Gift shop 52.95953°N 1.53701°W		Late 18th century	The former game larder in the grounds of Kedleston Hall, later used as a gift shop, is in stone on a plinth, with a sill band, a moulded eaves cornice, and a Welsh slate roof with a hexagonal ventilator lantern. There is a single storey and a hexagonal plan. On the south front is a doorway, and the other fronts contain broad square windows.	II
The Smithy; 52.96932°N 1.54593°W		Late 18th century	The smithy, later a private house, is in colourwashed brick with a hipped and gabled Welsh slate roof. There are two storeys and an L-shaped plan, consisting of a north range of four bays, and two bays on the east front. All the openings have pointed arched heads and the windows have Y-tracery, those in the ground floor set in round-arched recesses with impost bands. In the east front is a doorway with a Gothic fanlight, flanked by side windows.	II
The Orangery; 52.95881°N 1.53956°W		1800–01	The orangery in the grounds of Kedleston Hall was designed by George Richardson. It is in sandstone and has a moulded and dentilled cornice and a blocking course, and on the corners are urn finials with swags. There is a single tall storey and five bays, the bays separated by fluted pilasters. Each bay contains a tall sash window, and steps lead up to the central bay. The doorway in the south front has a moulded architrave, and there is a blind doorway in the north front.	II*
Milepost; 52.96998°N 1.54806°W	—	Early 19th century	The milepost on the southwest side of Kedleston Road is in cast iron. It has a triangular plan and a sloping gabled back plate. The milepost is inscribed with the name of the parish, and the distances to London, Weston Underwood and Derby.	II
Iron screen 52.95981°N 1.53576°W		c. 1914	Enclosing a large semicircular area to the north of Kedleston Hall is a wrought iron screen. It contains four pairs of openwork iron gate piers with fencing between.	II
Arcade and ice house 52.95908°N 1.53768°W		Undated	The covered arcade in the grounds of Kedleston Hall is in red brick with sandstone dressings and a hipped Welsh slate roof. There is a single storey and eight bays, one with a doorway, and the others with an impost band. Attached to the south are two 20th-century pergolas, with Tuscan Doric columns. At the east end is an ice house, entered by a full height doorway with a segmental head. Inside, a passage leads to a circular ice house with a brick dome.	II
