= David of Dinant =

Pantheistic philosopher

David of Dinant (c. 1160 – c. 1217) was a pantheistic philosopher. He may have been a member of, or at least been influenced by, a pantheistic sect known as the Amalricians. David was condemned by the Catholic Church in 1210 for his writing of the "Quaternuli" (Little Notebooks), which forced him to flee Paris. When and where he died is unknown; all that can be ascertained is that he died after the year 1215, as he was condemned again in the council of 1215.

Since David's works were banned, most of what is known of him is from the writings of his contemporaries and opponents, chiefly Albert the Great and St. Thomas Aquinas. David's philosophy was that everything could be divided among bodies, minds, and eternal substances. The indivisible substrate or constituent of bodies is matter (hyle); of minds or souls, intellect (nous); and of eternal substances, God (Deus). These three, matter, intellect, and God, are actually one and the same. Consequently, all things, material, intellectual, and spiritual, have one and the same essence—God.

== Life and work ==
Little is known about the details of his life. It is not certain whether he was born at Dinant in Wallonia, or at Dinan in Brittany. He is believed to have lived for some time at the Roman Court under Pope Innocent III. He was a magister, or teacher, most likely at the University of Paris, and he studied the classical works of Aristotle which had been reintroduced to Europe after the Crusades. It seems likely he was especially influenced by Aristotle's Physics and Metaphysics. It was in Paris that his work, entitled Quaternuli (Little Notebooks), was condemned by a provincial council in 1210. The Council was headed by Peter of Corbeil, the Bishop of Sens, and ordered the body of Amalric of Chartres to be disinterred and burned, David's writings to be burned, and forbade reading Aristotle's works on natural philosophy. Anyone in the possession of David's writings after Christmas was declared a heretic. This condemnation of both David and Aristotle was repeated in 1215 by a letter of Cardinal Robert Courçon, papal legate. From a work ascribed to Albert the Great, "Compilatio de Novo Spiritu", in the Munich Library, we learn further that in consequence of the condemnation, David fled from France, and so escaped punishment. Besides the "Quaternuli", another work entitled "De Tomis, seu Divisionibus" is mentioned. It is not improbable, however, that this was merely another title for the "Quaternuli". The effect of the order issued by the council was to cause all the writing of David to disappear. Thus, his doctrines are derived from the assertions of his contemporaries and opponents, notably Albert the Great and St. Thomas as mentioned above.

== Theology ==
From these sources we learn that David was a Pantheist. He identified God with the material substratum of all things, materia prima (prime matter). He reduced all reality to three categories, namely bodies, minds, and eternal substances. The indivisible substrate or constituent of bodies is matter (hyle); of minds, or souls, intellect (nous); and of eternal substances, God (Deus). These three, matter, intellect, and God, are one and the same. Consequently, all things, material, intellectual, and spiritual, have one and the same essence—God. The phraseology, which must be David's own, as well as the title above mentioned, "De Tomis", suggests the influence of Johannes Scotus Eriugena. Eriugena's work must have been widely known and read in the first decades of the thirteenth century, as is evident from many undeniable facts. Whether David was influenced also by Amalric of Chartres is a matter of debate. Albert, who was a contemporary of David, says that David merely renewed the heresy of someone known as Alexander, "who taught that God and intellect and matter are one substance". It is impossible to determine whom Albert means by Alexander, "a disciple of Xenophanes"; probably the reference is to some Arabian work that went under the name of a Greek philosopher. There were several works of that kind current in the early part of the thirteenth century. Some critics, however, put forward the surmise that David's immediate source was Avicebron's "Fons Vitæ", or the work "De Unitate", written by Archdeacon Gundisalvi of Segovia, who was well versed in Arabian philosophical literature. Whatever the source, the doctrines were pantheistic, as all authorities concur in describing them.

The 1913 Catholic Encyclopedia takes a rather dim view of David's philosophy, and considers the harsh response understandable. It says:

((This pantheism)) of itself would justify the drastic measures to which the Council of Paris had recourse. There were, moreover, circumstances which rendered summary condemnation necessary. On the one hand the University of Paris was being made the scene of an organized attempt to foist the Arabian pantheistic interpretation of Greek philosophy on the schools of Latin Christendom. Texts, translations, and commentaries were introduced every day from Spain, in which doctrines incompatible with Christian dogma were openly taught. On the other hand, there was the popular movement in the South of France which found its principal expression in the Albigensian heresy, while in learned and ascetic communities in the North, the anti-hierarchical mysticism of the Calabrian Joachim of Floris was being combined with the more speculative pantheistic mysticism of Johannes Scotus Eriugena. In view of these conditions the condemnation of the errors of David of Dinant, the complete extirpation of the sect of Amalricians to which he apparently belonged, and the unwonted harshness of St. Thomas's reference to him cannot be judged untimely or intemperate.

Historians have thought that the reason St. Albert and St. Thomas responded to David at all was not so much out of fear of David's pantheism, but rather to defend Aristotle. David strongly drew on Aristotle's thoughts on prime matter and form, and Albert and Thomas – both of whom respected Aristotle – wanted to show that Aristotle's writings need not imply pantheism. To do this, they had to dispute David, lest the banning of Aristotle's writings spread outside Paris.

== See also ==
- Two attributes in Spinozism: Thought and Extension
- Christian materialism
