= Sir John Curzon, 1st Baronet =

English politician and landowner

Sir John Curzon, 1st Baronet PC, JP
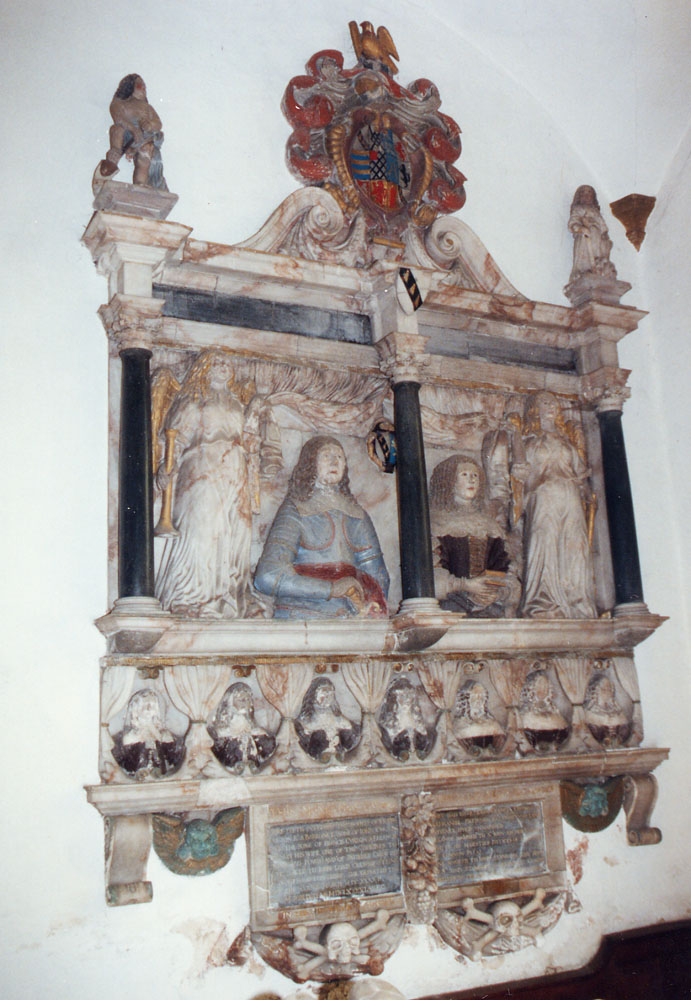
- Monument to Sir John Curzon, All Saints Church, Kedleston

Member of Parliament for Derbyshire
- In office 1640 – 1648 (excluded by Pride's Purge)

High Sheriff of Derbyshire
- In office 1637–1638

Member of Parliament for Brackley
- In office 1628–1629

Personal details
- Born: 13 November 1598 Kedleston Hall
- Died: 13 December 1686 (aged 88) Kedleston Hall
- Resting place: All Saints Church, Kedleston
- Party: Parliamentarian
- Spouse: Patience Crewe (1623–1642)
- Children: Nathaniel
- Education: Magdalen College, Oxford
- Occupation: Landowner and politician

Sir John Curzon, 1st Baronet (13 November 1598 – 13 December 1686), of Kedleston Hall in Derbyshire, was an English politician and landowner who served as a Member of Parliament from 1628 to 1629, then 1640 to 1648. A devout Presbyterian, he supported the Parliamentarian cause during the First English Civil War, but was excluded by Pride's Purge in 1648.

== Personal details ==
John Curzon was born 13 November 1598, eldest son of John Curzon (1552–1632) of Kedleston Hall, who was High Sheriff of Derbyshire in 1609, and Millicent Sacheveral (1571–1618), daughter of Sir Ralph Sacheverel of Staunton, and widow of Thomas Gell (1552–1594) of Hopton, Derbyshire.

In 1623 he married Patience Crewe (1600–1642), daughter of Sir Thomas Crewe of Stene, Northamptonshire; they had four sons and three daughters.

== Career ==
Curzon graduated from Magdalen College, Oxford, in 1618, aged 18, then attended the Inner Temple in 1620. In 1628 he was elected Member of Parliament for Brackley and sat until 1629 when King Charles decided to rule without parliament for eleven years. He inherited the Kedleston estate on his father's death in 1632.

Curzon was created a Baronet, of Kedleston in the County of Derby, in both the Baronetage of Nova Scotia on 18 June 1636 and the Baronetage of England on 11 August 1641. He served as High Sheriff of Derbyshire in 1637. In April 1640, he was elected as MP for Derbyshire in the Short Parliament and in November 1640 re-elected MP for Derbyshire for the Long Parliament, sitting until he was excluded under Pride's Purge in 1648.

Curzon died in 1686 and was buried at All Saints Church, Kedleston. He was succeeded in the baronetcy by his eldest surviving son Nathaniel (1636–1719).

== Sources ==
- Moseley, Virginia; Sgroi, Rosemary (2010). CURZON, John (1598–1686), of Kedleston, Derbys. in The History of Parliament: the House of Commons 1604-1629. Boydell & Brewer.
- findagrave.com burial record

Parliament of England
| Preceded by John Crew; Sir John Hobart | Member of Parliament for Brackley; 1628–1629; With: Sir Thomas Wenman | Parliament suspended until 1640 |
| Vacant Parliament suspended since 1629 | Member of Parliament for Derbyshire; 1640–1648; With: John Manners 1640; Sir John Coke 1640–1648 | Succeeded by Sir John Coke |
Baronetage of Nova Scotia
| New creation | Baronet of Kedleston; 1636–1686 | Succeeded by Nathaniel Curzon |
Baronetage of England
| New creation | Baronet of Kedleston; 1641–1686 | Succeeded by Nathaniel Curzon |
