= Kedleston Hall =

Seat of the Curzon family, located in Derbyshire, England

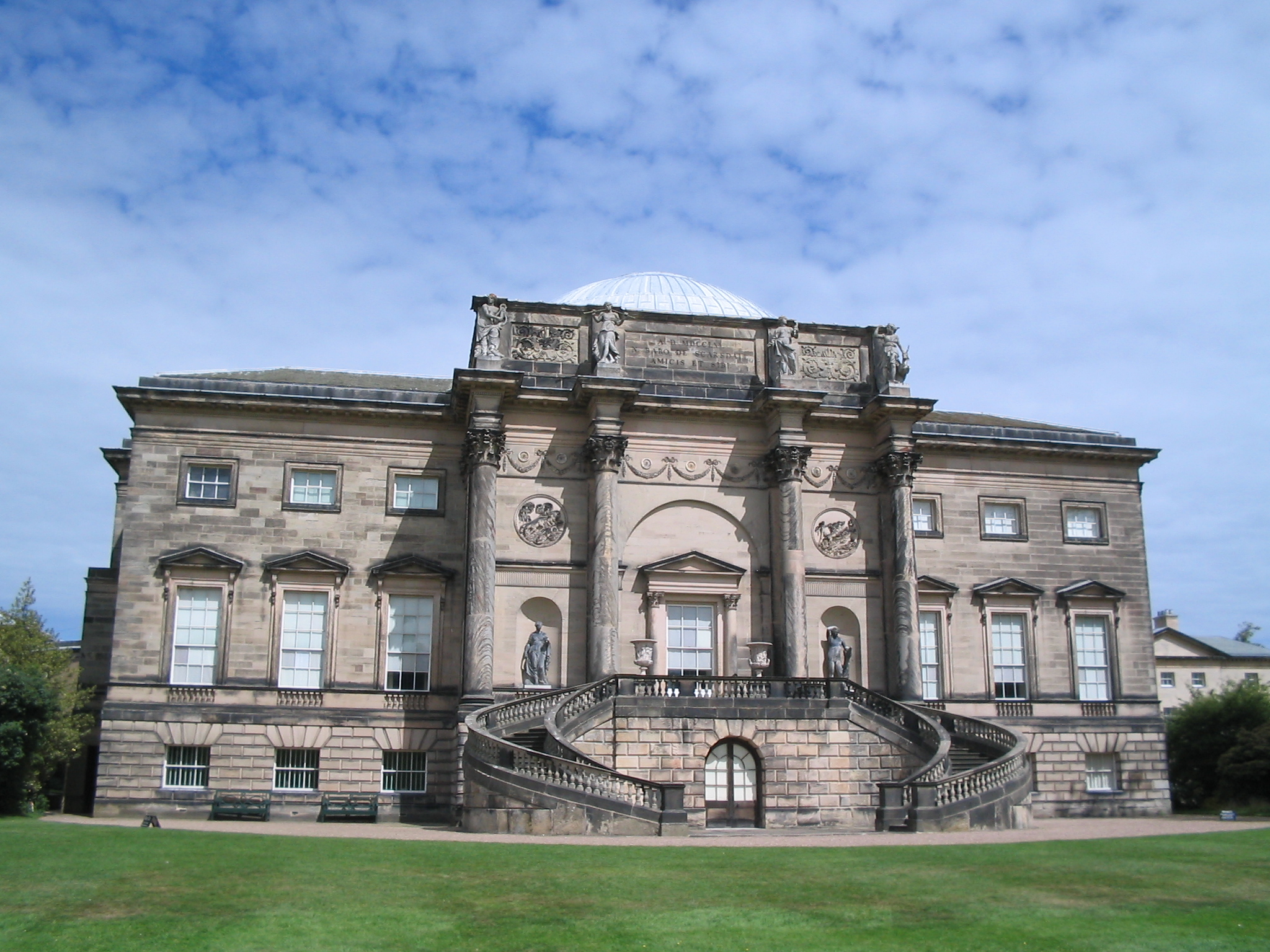
- Kedleston Hall, the south front

- Location within Derbyshire

General information
- Type: House
- Architectural style: Palladian
- Location: near Kedleston, Derbyshire, England
- Coordinates: 52°57′33″N 01°32′09″W
- Elevation: 95 m (312 ft)
- Construction started: 1759
- Completed: 1765
- Owner: National Trust

Design and construction
- Architects: Matthew Brettingham; Robert Adam; James Paine

Website
- www.nationaltrust.org.uk/kedleston-hall

Listed Building – Grade I
- Official name: Kedleston Hall
- Designated: 25 September 1951
- Reference no.: 1311507

Kedleston Hall is a large English country house with a Palladian exterior and Neo-classical interiors, now owned by the National Trust, built in the 1760s as the seat of the Curzon family, near Kedleston in Derbyshire, England, approximately 4 miles (6 km) north-west of Derby. The medieval village of Kedleston was moved in 1759 by Nathaniel Curzon to make way for the manor. All that remains of the original village is the 12th-century All Saints Church.

== Background ==
The current house was commissioned in 1759 by Nathaniel Curzon and designed by Robert Adam.

The Curzon family, whose name originates in Notre-Dame-de-Courson in Normandy, have been in Kedleston since at least 1297, have lived in a succession of manor houses near to or on the site of the present Kedleston Hall. The present house was commissioned by Sir Nathaniel Curzon (later 1st Baron Scarsdale) in 1759. Work began under the Palladian architects James Paine and Matthew Brettingham, loosely based on an original plan by Andrea Palladio for the never-built Villa Mocenigo.

Subsequently Robert Adam, a relatively unknown architect at that time designed some garden temples to enhance the landscape of the park; Curzon was so impressed with his designs that Adam was quickly put in charge of the construction of the new mansion.

On the death of Richard Curzon, 2nd Viscount Scarsdale in 1977, expenses compelled the heir, his cousin (Francis Curzon), to transfer the property to the care of the National Trust.

== Exterior ==
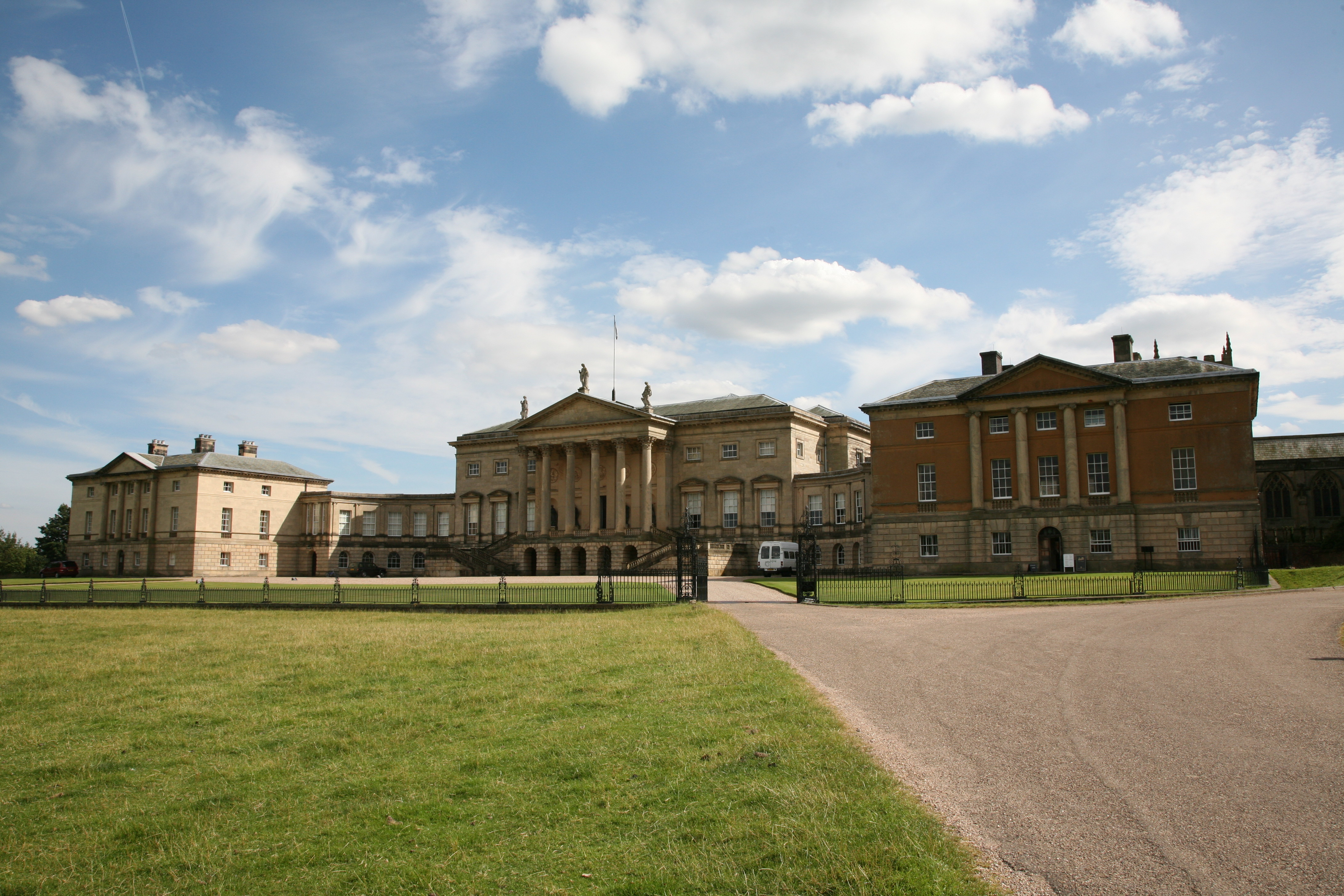
Kedleston Hall was Brettingham's opportunity to prove himself capable of designing a house to rival Holkham Hall. The opportunity was taken from him by Robert Adam who completed the North front (above) much as Brettingham designed it, but with a more dramatic portico.

The design of the three storey house is of three blocks linked by two segmentally curved corridors. The ground floor is rusticated, while the upper floors are of smooth-dressed stone. The central, corps de logis, the largest block, contains the state rooms and was intended only for formal entertaining. The east block was a self-contained country house in its own right, containing all the rooms for the family's private use, and the identical West block contained the kitchens and all other domestic rooms and staff accommodation.

Plans for two more pavilions (as the two smaller blocks are known), of identical size and similar appearance, were never executed. These further wings were intended to contain, in the south-east a music room, and in the south-west a conservatory and chapel. Externally these latter pavilions would have differed from their northern counterparts by large glazed Serlian windows on the piano nobile of their southern facades. Here the blocks were to appear as of two floors only; a mezzanine was to have been disguised in the north of the music room block. The linking galleries here were also to contain larger windows than on the north, and niches containing classical statuary.

The north front, approximately 107 metres (351 ft) in length, is Palladian in character, dominated by a massive, six-columned Corinthian portico; however, the south front (illustrated right) is pure neoclassical Robert Adam. This garden facade is divided into three distinct sets of bays; the central section is a four-columned, blind triumphal arch (based on the Arch of Constantine in Rome) containing one large, pedimented glass door reached from the rusticated ground floor by an external, curved double staircase. Above the door, at second-floor height, are stone garlands and medallions in relief.

The four Corinthian columns are topped by classical statues. This whole centre section of the facade is crowned by a low dome visible only from a distance. Flanking the central section are two identical wings on three floors, each three windows wide, the windows of the first-floor piano nobile being the tallest. Adam's design for this facade contains huge "movement" and has a delicate almost fragile quality.

== Interior ==
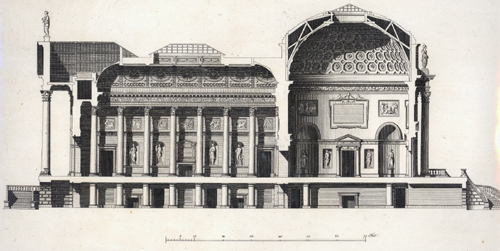
A cross section through the hall and saloon

The neoclassical interior of the house was designed by Adam to be no less impressive than the exterior.

=== Hall ===
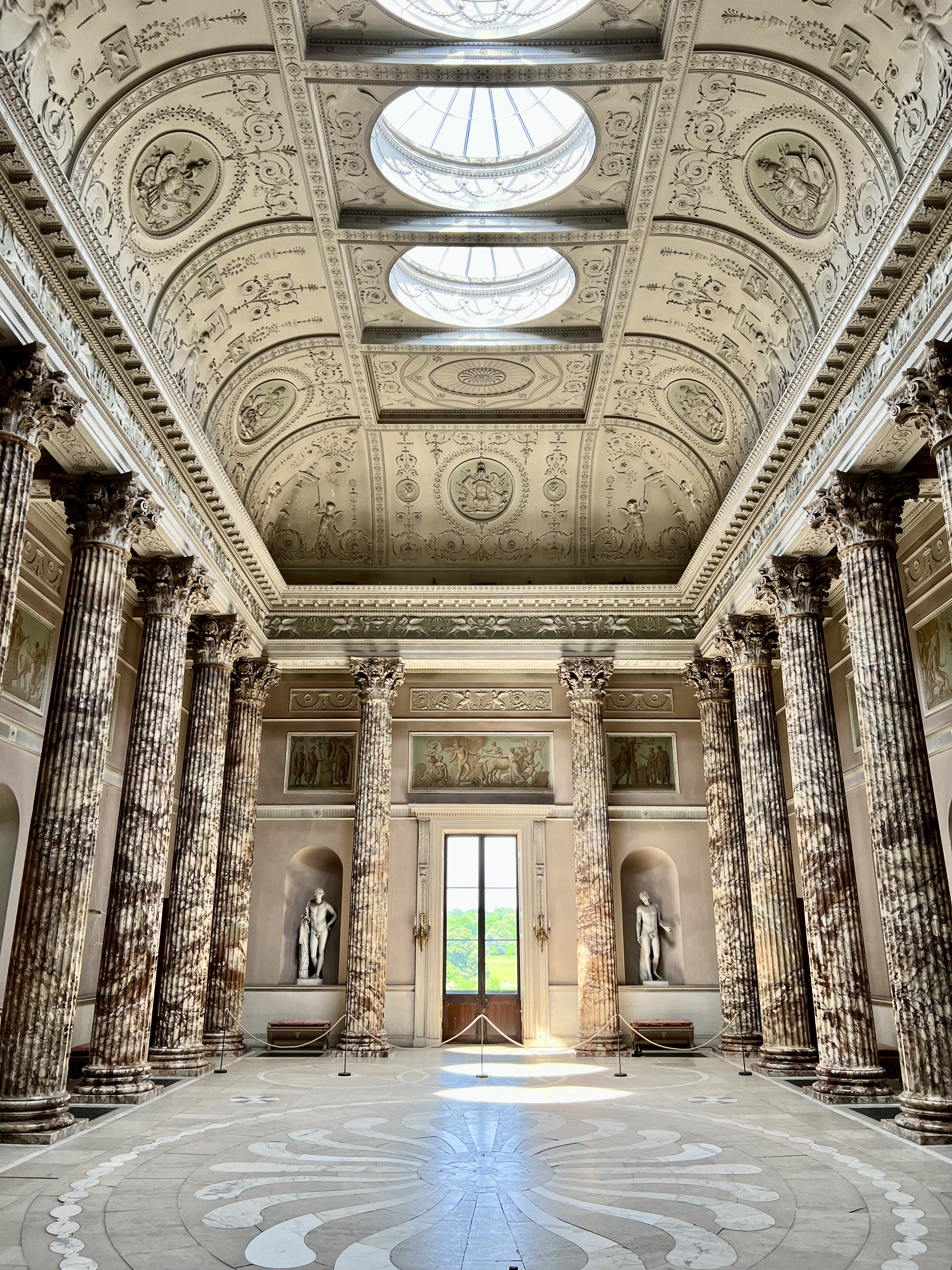
Marble Hall 1763, decoration completed in 1776–77

Entering the house through the great north portico on the piano nobile, one is confronted by the marble hall. Nikolaus Pevsner describes this as one of the most magnificent apartments of the 18th century in England. It measures 67 feet (20 m) by 37 feet (11 m) in plan and is 40 feet (12 m) high.

Twenty fluted pink Nottingham alabaster columns with Corinthian capitals support the heavily decorated, high-coved cornice. Niches in the walls contain casts of classical statuary by Matthew Brettingham the Younger and others; above the niches are grisaille panels of Homeric subjects inspired by Palladio's illustration of the Temple of Mars. The stucco in the ceiling was created by Joseph Rose in the 1770s.

The floor is of inlaid Italian marble. Matthew Paine's original designs for this room intended for it to be lit by conventional windows at the northern end, but Adam, warming to the Roman theme, did away with the distracting windows and lit the whole from the roof through an innovative glass skylight.

The overmantels to the fireplaces are by Rose with firebaskets by Adam.

At Kedleston, the hall symbolises the atrium of the Roman villa and the adjoining saloon the vestibulum.

=== Saloon ===
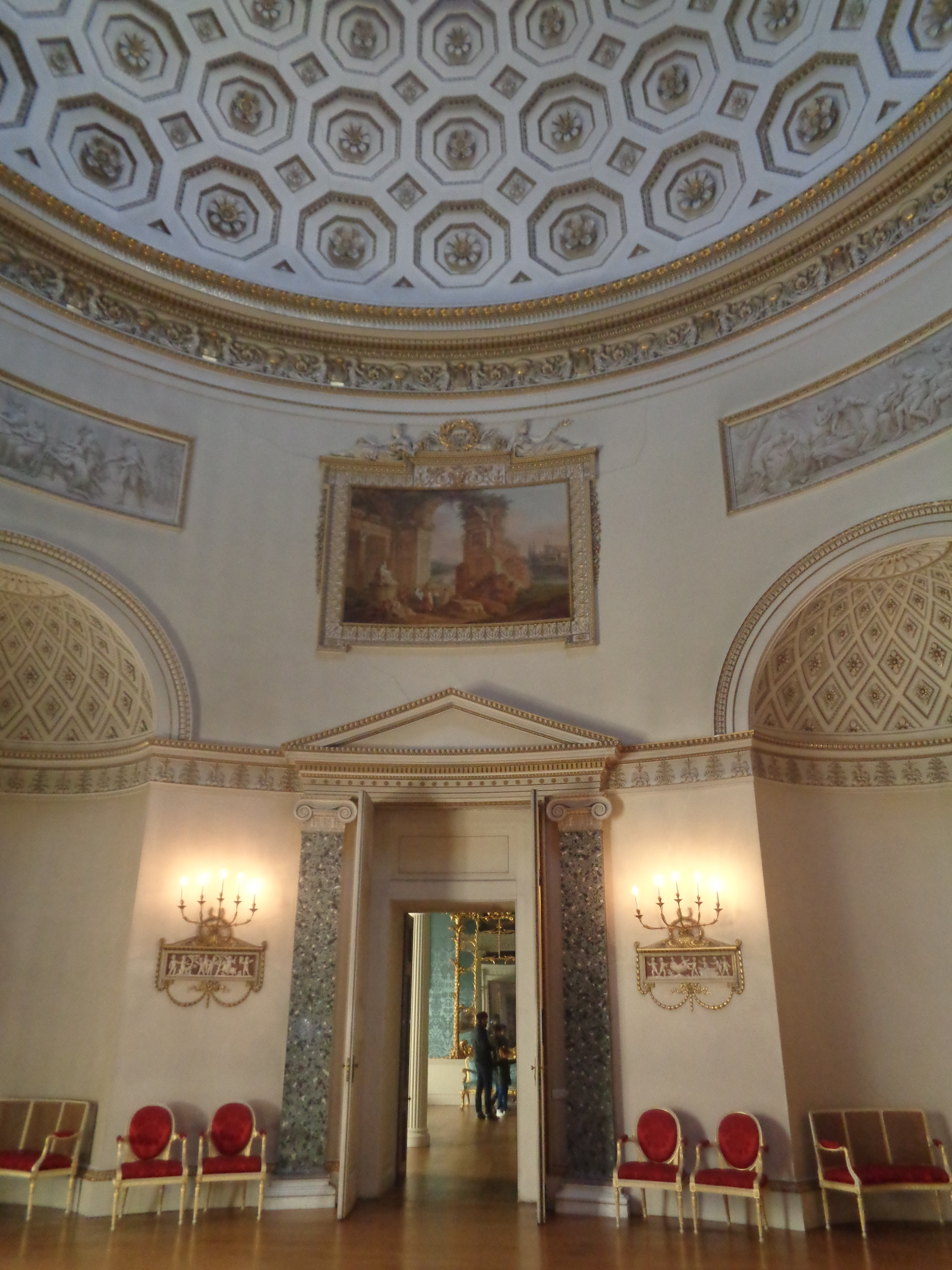
The saloon

The saloon, contained behind the triumphal arch of the south front, like the marble hall rises the full height of the house, 62 feet (19 m) to the top of the dome, where it too is sky-lit through a glass oculus. Designed as a sculpture gallery, this circular room 42 feet (13 m) in width was completed in 1763.

The decorative theme is based on the temples of the Roman Forum with more modern inventions: in the four massive, apse-like recesses are stoves disguised as pedestals for classical urns. The paintings of ruins are by Gavin Hamilton and the grisaille panels have scenes of British worthies painted by John Biagio Rebecca.

The four sets of double doors giving entry to the room have heavy pediments supported by scagliola columns, and at second-floor height, grisaille panels depict classical themes.

From the saloon, the atmosphere of the 18th-century Grand Tour is continued throughout the remainder of the principal reception rooms of the piano nobile, though on a slightly more modest scale.

=== State bedroom ===
The "principal apartment", or state bedroom suite, contains fine furniture and paintings.

The state bed was constructed by James Gravenor of Derby. The state bed posts are carved to represent palm tree trunks which soar up and break into flamboyant foliage at the top, sweeping in palm-fronds behind.

=== Drawing room ===
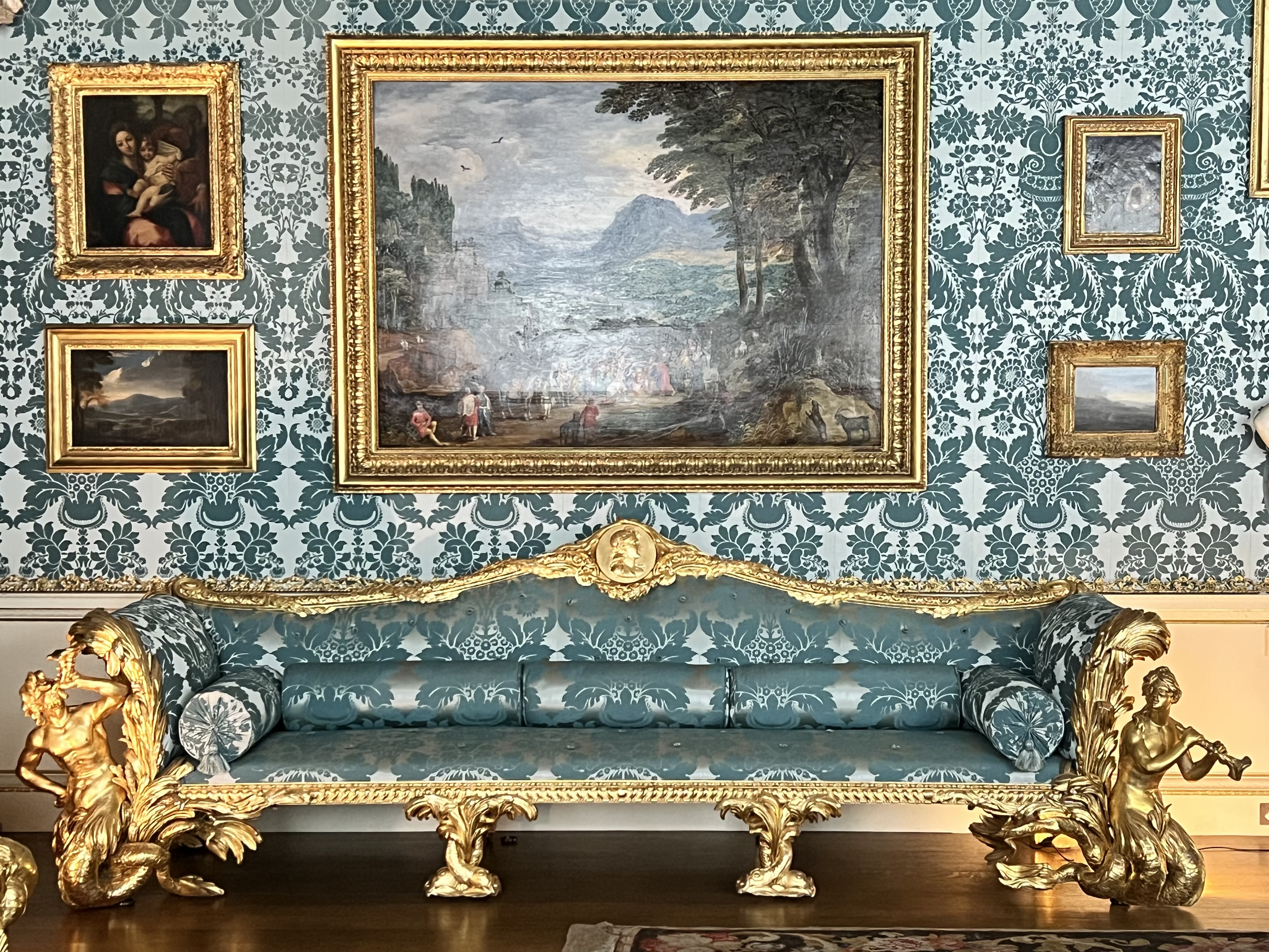
Settee by John Linnell in the Drawing Room dated from around 1765.

The drawing room with a huge alabaster Venetian window is 44 feet (13 m) by 28 feet (8.5 m) by 28 feet (8.5 m). The doorcase is also alabaster. The fireplace with a scene of virtue rewarded by honour and riches is flanked by large female figures sculpted by Michael Henry Spang. The gilt sofas by John Linnell date from around 1765. They were commissioned by the 1st Baron Scarsdale and supplied, together with a second pair of sofas, to Kedleston in 1765.

=== Dining room ===
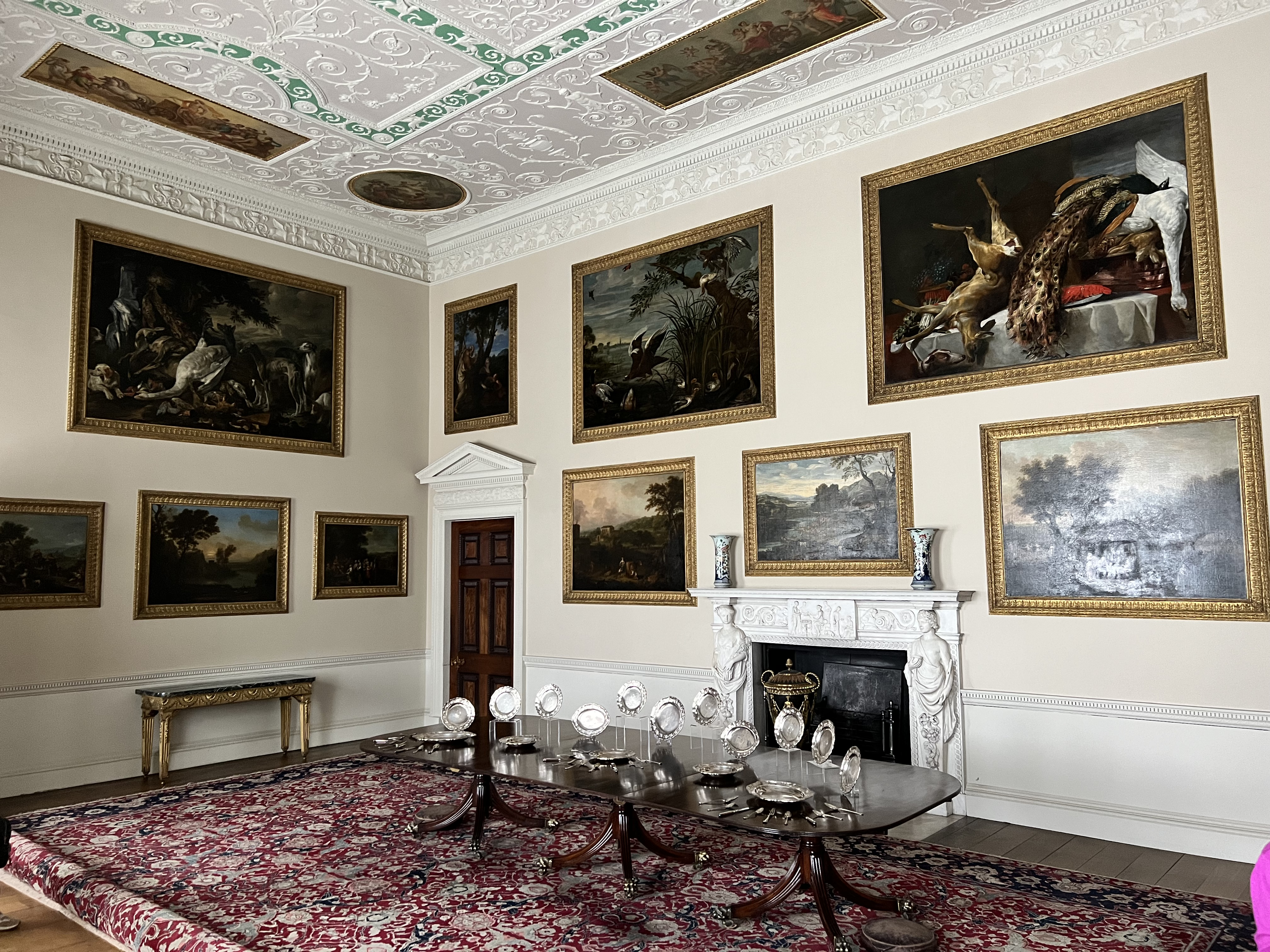
The dining room

The dining room, with its gigantic apse, has a ceiling that Adam based on the Domus Augustana in the Farnese Gardens. The apse contains curved tables designed by Adam in 1762 and a giant wine cooler. The ceiling contains panel paintings of the continents by Antonio Zucchi, the seasons by Gavin Hamilton and the centre is by George Morland. The original wall panels are by Francesco Zuccarelli, Frans Snyders, Claude and Giovanni Francesco Romanelli.

=== Music Room ===
The Music Room has Ionic doorcases and delicate plaster ceiling designed by Adam. The marble chimneypiece is inlaid with Blue John. The pipe organ was second hand by John Snetzler with the case designed by Robert Adam and built by Robert Gravenor. A second manual with Hautboy was added in 1824 by Alexander Buckingham. The organ was restored in 1993 by Dominic Gwynn.

=== Library ===
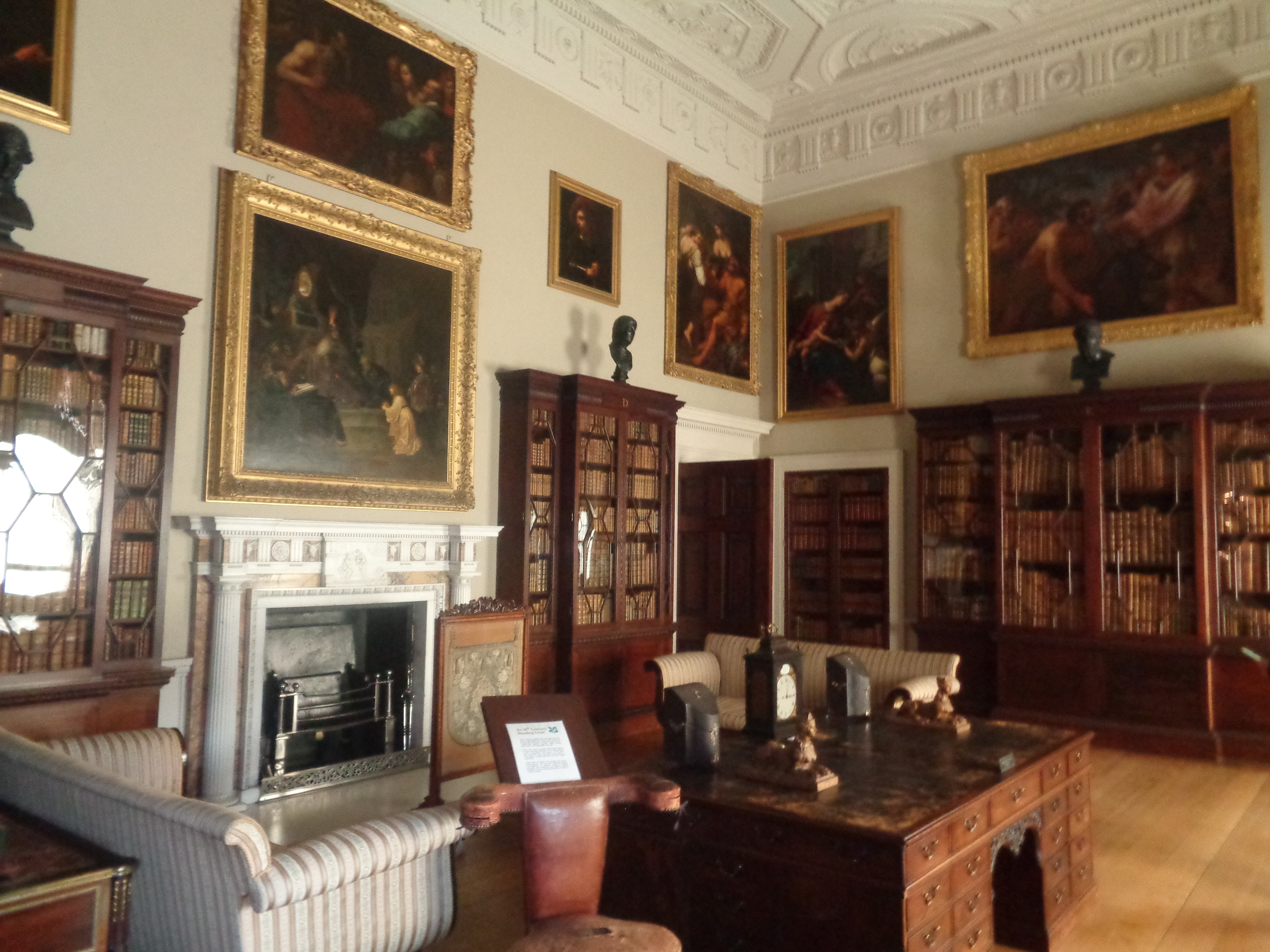
The Library

The library contains a Roman doric doorcase leading to the Saloon. The bookcases were designed by Adam and built by James Gravenor of Derby. The plaster ceiling is divided into octagonal patterns. The library desk was built in 1764 by James Gravenor.

=== Other rooms ===
The theme carries on through the music room, down the grand staircase (not completed until 1922) onto the ground floor and into the so-called "Caesar's hall". On the departure of guests, it must sometimes have been a relief to vacate this temple of culture and retreat to the relatively simple comforts of the family pavilion.

Below the rotunda is the Tetrastyle Hall, which was converted into a museum in 1927 in collaboration with the Victoria and Albert Museum in London. The kitchen is an oblong shape with a balustraded gallery at one end. This links the room to other household offices on each side.

Also displayed in the house are many curiosities pertaining to George, Lord Curzon of Kedleston, who succeeded to the house in 1916 and who had earlier served as Viceroy of India from 1899 to 1905. Lord Curzon had amassed a large collection of subcontinental and Far Eastern artefacts. Also shown is Lady Curzon's Delhi Durbar Coronation dress of 1903. Designed by Worth of Paris, it was known as the peacock dress for the many precious and semi-precious stones sewn into its fabric. These have now been replaced by imitation stones; however, the effect is no less dazzling.

In addition to that described above, the house contains collections of art, furniture and statuary, hence Kedleston Hall's alternative name, The Temple of the Arts.

== Gardens and grounds ==
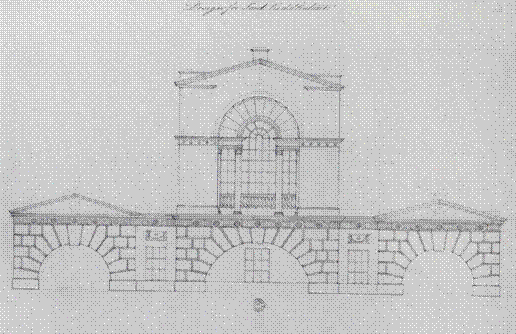
A sketch by Robert Adam for the Fishing Room and Boat House at Kedleston. Circa 1769

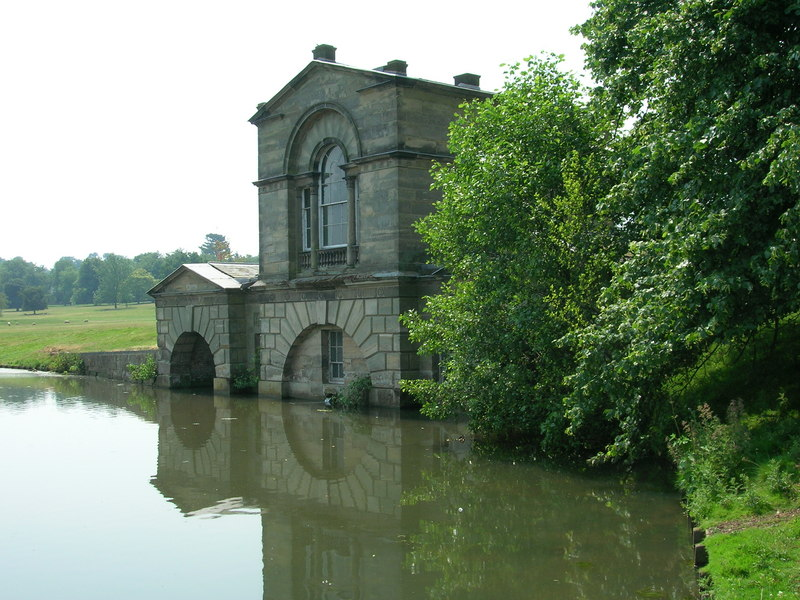
Fishing Room and Boat House built 1770–72

The gardens and grounds, as they appear today, are largely the concept of Adam. He was asked by Nathaniel Curzon in 1758 to "take in hand the deer park and pleasure grounds". The landscape gardener William Emes had begun work at Kedleston in 1756, and he continued in Curzon's employ until 1760; however, it was Adam who was the guiding influence. It was during this period that the former gardens designed by Charles Bridgeman were swept away in favour of a more natural-looking landscape. Bridgeman's canals and geometric ponds were metamorphosed into serpentine lakes.

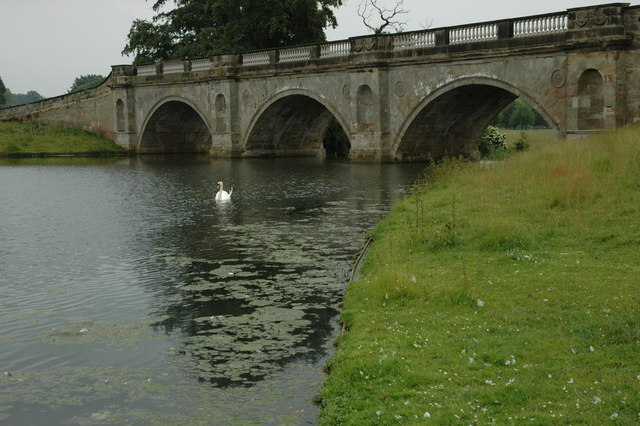
The Bridge by Robert Adam built 1770–71

Adam designed numerous temples and follies, many of which were never built. Those that were include the North lodge (which takes the form of a triumphal arch), the entrance lodges in the village, a bridge, cascade and the Fishing Room. The Fishing Room is one of the most noticeable of the park's buildings. In the neoclassical style it is sited on the edge of the upper lake and contains a plunge pool and boat house below. Some of Adam's unexecuted design for follies in the park rivalled in grandeur the house itself.

A "View Tower" designed in 1760 – 84 feet (26 m) tall and 50 feet (15 m) wide on five floors, surmounted by a saucer dome flanked by the smaller domes of flanking towers — would have been a small neoclassical palace itself. Adam planned to transform even mundane utilitarian buildings into architectural wonders. A design for a pheasant house (a platform to provide a vantage point for the game shooting) became a domed temple, the roofs of its classical porticos providing the necessary platforms; this plan too was never completed. Among the statuary in the grounds is a Medici lion sculpture carved by Joseph Wilton on a pedestal designed by Samuel Wyatt, from around 1760–1770.

In the 1770s, George Richardson designed the hexagonal summerhouse, and in 1800 the orangery. The Long Walk was laid out in 1760 and planted with flowering shrubs and ornamental trees. In 1763, it was reported that Lord Scarsdale had given his gardener a seed from the rare and scarce Italian shrub, the "Rodo Dendrone" (sic).

The gardens and grounds today, over two hundred years later, remain mostly unaltered. Parts of the park are designated as a Site of Special Scientific Interest, primarily because of the "rich and diverse deadwood invertebrate fauna" inhabiting its ancient trees.

== Later history ==
=== Second World War ===
In 1939, Kedleston Hall was offered by Richard Curzon, 2nd Viscount Scarsdale, for use by the War Office. The hall was used in various ways during the war, including as a mustering point and army training camp.

It also formed one of the Y-stations used to gather signals intelligence by collecting radio transmissions which, if encrypted, were subsequently passed to Bletchley Park for decryption.

=== Post-war ===
In 1957, Viscount Scarsdale launched a programme of restoration on the exterior of the building which was estimated to cost £30,000 (equivalent to £630,000 in 2025). Lord Scarsdale contributed £10,000 and the state provided the rest.

In 1973–74, the central block roof was re-slated and exterior stonework was cleaned by Stone and Marble Maintenance Ltd of Willington Road, Etwall. This revealed the pinkish tinge in the sandy coloured stone.

=== National Trust ===
By the 1970s, Kedleston Hall had become too expensive for the Curzon family to maintain. When Richard Curzon, 2nd Viscount Scarsdale, died, his cousin Francis Curzon, 3rd Viscount Scarsdale, offered the house, park and gardens to the nation in lieu of death duties. A deal was agreed with the National Trust that it should take over Kedleston, along with an endowment, while still allowing the family to live rent-free in the 23-room Family Wing, which contained an adjoining garden and two rent-free flats for servants or other family members. Richard Curzon and his family currently reside there.

The National Trust engaged Edward Wood and Sons in 1987–88 for a £1,000,000 (equivalent to £2,892,600 in 2025) programme of restoration. The West Pavilion was given a new roof and a new central heating system was installed. The grand staircase was strengthened with reinforcing bars to stop the cantilevered stairs from sagging.

== See also ==
- Grade I listed buildings in Derbyshire
- Listed buildings in Kedleston
- All Saints Church, Kedleston, traditional burial place of the Curzon family of Kedleston Hall
- Raj Bhavan in Calcutta, which as 'Government House' served as the official residence of the Governor-General of India from its completion in 1803 until the capital of British India was shifted to New Delhi in the early 20th century. Government House was built on the lines of Kedleston Hall. By coincidence a prominent member of the House of Curzon, George, Lord Curzon of Kedleston, became Viceroy of India in 1899 and was consequently resident of both houses.

The travel writer E. V. Lucas later commented that "It is easier in Calcutta to be suddenly transported to England than in any other Indian city that I visited. There are, it is true, more statues of Lord Curzon than we are accustomed to [in England]; but many of the homes are quite English, save for the multitude of servants; Government House, serene and spacious and patrician, is a replica of Kedlestone Hall in Derbyshire."
