= Robert of Courson =

English cardinal (1160/1170–1219)

- Cardinal of S. Stefano al Monte Celio
- Other post: Canon of the cathedral chapter of Paris
- Previous post: Canon of the cathedral chapter of Noyon

Orders
- Created cardinal: 18 February 1212 by Pope Innocent III
- Rank: Cardinal priest

Personal details
- Born: circa 1160/1170 England
- Died: 6 February 1219 (aged c. 49–59) Damietta, Egypt
- Buried: Damietta, Egypt
- Denomination: Roman Catholic

Robert of Courson or Courçon (also written de Curson, or Curzon; c. 1160/1170 – 1219) was a scholar at the University of Paris and later a cardinal and papal legate.

== Life ==
Robert of Courson was born in England some time between 1160 and 1170. Little is known about his family or early life. He may have been a member of an Anglo-Norman family originating from the village of Notre-Dame-de-Courson in Normandy. Robert was a student of the Parisian theologian Peter the Chanter - a reference to Peter's death in 1197 in Robert's Summa indicates that he must have studied with the Chanter near the end of his career in the 1190s.

According to Caesarius of Heisterbach, Robert taught theology at the University of Paris, probably starting sometime before 1200 and ending when he became a cardinal priest of Saint Stephen of Mount Celius in 1212. Prior to that time he had served as a judge delegate in Paris. In 1213, when Innocent III proclaimed the Fourth Lateran Council to take place in 1215, Robert was made a papal legate to France to help prepare. In this capacity, Robert convened a number of local councils and preached a new crusade in the Holy Land. Robert also ordered new rules for his former university in August 1215, banning certain treatments of Aristotle and the pointed pigache shoes then in fashion. He further attempted to mediate between King John of England and Philip Augustus of France in order to dissuade John from attempting to reconquer lost English possessions in France, eventually leading to a peace in 1215. Robert may also have participated briefly in the Albigensian Crusade in 1214. Robert was not popular as a legate in France and in 1215 the French clergy refused to attend a council he had summoned in Bourges, after which Robert attempted to have them excommunicated.

Robert's term as legate ended with the Fourth Lateran Council in 1215, after which he was sent to Rome. Many of his decisions as papal legate were negated by Innocent or his successor Pope Honorius III. In 1218, Robert was made a papal preacher on the Fifth Crusade to Egypt, where he died during the Siege of Damietta on 6 February 1219.

== Works ==
He is the author of several works, including a Summa devoted to questions of canon law and ethics and dealing at length with the question of usury.

His interference in the affairs of the University of Paris, in the midst of the confusion arising from the introduction of the Arabian translations of Aristotle, resulted in the proscription (1215) of the metaphysical as well as the physical treatises of the Stagyrita, together with the summaries thereof (Summæ de eiusdem). At the same time, his rescript (Denifle, "Chartul. Univ. Paris", I, 78) renews the condemnation of the Pantheists David of Dinant and Amaury of Bene, but permits the use, as texts, of Aristotle's Ethics and the logical treatises. The rescript also contains several enactments relating to academic discipline.
