= Michael Henry Spang =

Danish sculptor (died 1762)

Michael Henry Spang (died 1762) was a Danish artist and sculptor who worked mainly in England.

== Life ==
Spang came to England around 1756. He produced designs for the rebuilding of Kedleston Hall in 1759. His sculpture also decorated the Whitehall entrance to the Admiralty in London, and Earl Spencer's house London.

In 1760 he was an exhibitor at the Society of Artists of Great Britain. Around that time his memorial to James Thomson was set up in Westminster Abbey.

Spang was buried on 5 December 1762 in St Mary's Church, Lambeth, London.

== Works ==
- Decoration on the pediment of Spencer House Green Park, London
- Decoration on the screen Admiralty House, London
- Dining Room Fireplace, Kedleston Hall, Derbyshire
- Drawing Room Fireplace, Kedleston Hall, Derbyshire
- Music Room Fireplace, Kedleston Hall, Derbyshire
- Monument in memory of James Thompson (author of the Seasons) in Westminster Abbey, 1762

== Family ==
Spang married Mary Jackson on 26 October 1751 at St Swithin, London Stone. Their children were:

- William Henry (b. 31 July 1752)
- James (b. 5 October 1753)
- Joseph (b. 2 February 1756)
