= Peter of Corbeil =

Roman Catholic archbishop

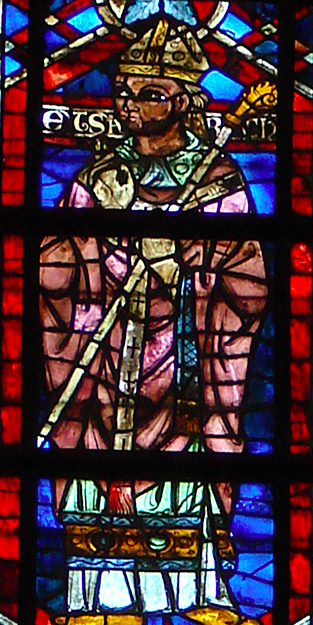

Peter of Corbeil (died 3 June 1222), born at Corbeil, was a preacher and canon of Notre Dame de Paris, a scholastic philosopher and master of theology at the University of Paris, ca 1189. He is remembered largely because his aristocratic student Lotario de' Conti became pope as Innocent III. In 1198 Innocent appointed him to the sinecures of prebendary and archdeacon of York. The following year Innocent raised his former master to the see of Cambrai, an immensely important diocese with a jurisdiction that covered Flanders. Peter became Archbishop of Sens in 1200. His interest in the intellectual life of Paris was undiminished: in 1210 he convoked a council at Paris that forbade the teaching, whether in public or privately, of the recently rediscovered Natural Philosophy (the Physics and very likely the Metaphysics) of Aristotle and the recently translated commentaries on Aristotle of Averroës (nec libri Aristotelis de naturali philosophia nec commenta legantur Parisius publice vel secreto), texts which were beginning to revolutionize the medieval approach to logical thinking, At the same time the council consigned to the public flames a work of David of Dinant that had been circulated since the end of the century, De Tomis, id est de Divisionibus (called the "Quaternuli"), which proposed that God is the matter which constitutes the inmost core of things (de Wulf 1909), a form of pantheism that was condemned by Albert the Great and Thomas Aquinas.

A manuscript of his commentary on Psalms is at the Bodleian Library, Oxford.
