= Fons Vitae =

Fons Vitae may refer to:

- a Latin expression meaning "Fountain of Life" or "Source of Life", referring to the Abrahamic imagery of the Rivers of Paradise
- Solomon Ibn Gabirol’s medieval philosophical dialogue, Yanbūʿ al-Ḥayāt
- Fons Vitae Publishing, an American academic publishing house
- One of the sections of the Godescalc Evangelistary
