= Amalric of Bena =

French theologian (died c. 1204–1207)

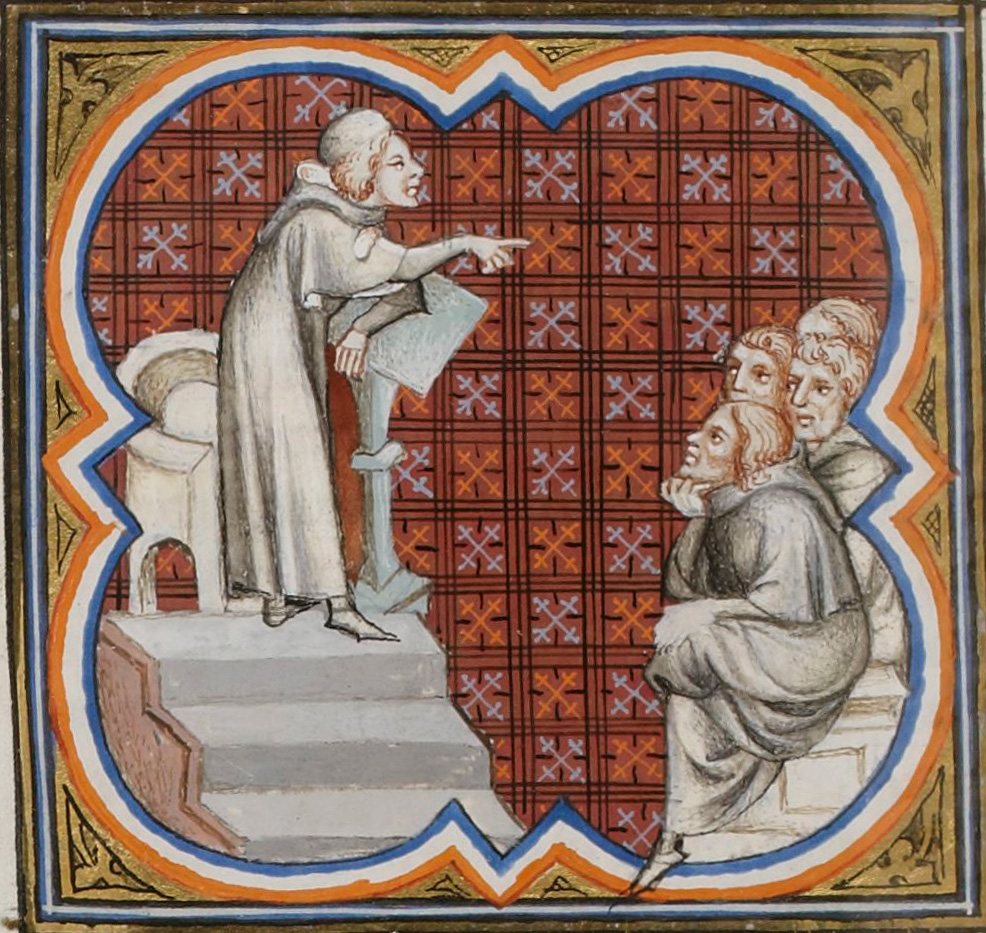
- A 14th-century depiction of Amalric of Bena teaching a group of people
- Born: 12th century Bennes, Kingdom of France
- Died: c. 1204–1207; Paris, Kingdom of France
- Other names: Amaury De Bène (French), Amalricus (Latin)
- Education: University of Paris
- Occupation: Theologian
- Known for: Founding Amalricianism

Amalric of Bena (French: Amaury de Bène, Amaury de Chartres; Latin: Almaricus, Amalricus, Amauricus; died c. 1204–1207) was a French theologian. His followers were known as the Amalricians.

== Biography ==
Amalric was born in the latter part of the 12th century at Bennes, a village between Ollé and Chauffours in the diocese of Chartres.

Amalric taught philosophy and theology at the University of Paris and enjoyed a great reputation as a subtle dialectician; his lectures developing the philosophy of Aristotle attracted a large audience. In 1204 his doctrines were condemned by the university and, on a personal appeal to Pope Innocent III, the sentence was ratified, Amalric being ordered to return to Paris and recant his errors.

His death was caused, it is said, by grief at the humiliation to which he had been subjected. In 1209, ten of his followers were burnt before the gates of Paris and Amalric's own body was exhumed and burnt and the ashes given to the winds. The doctrines of his followers, known as the Amalricians, were formally condemned by the fourth Lateran Council in 1215.

== Propositions ==
Amalric appears to have derived his philosophical system from Eriugena, whose principles he developed in a one-sided and strongly pantheistic form.

Only three propositions can be attributed to him with certainty:

1. that God is all (omnia sunt deus) and thus all things are one because whatever is, is God (omnia unum, quia quidquid est, est Deus);
2. that every Christian is bound to believe that he is a member of the body of Christ, and that this belief is necessary for salvation;
3. that he who remains in love of God can commit no sin.

Because of the first proposition, God himself is thought to be invisible and only recognizable in his creation.

According to Hosea Ballou, then Pierre Batiffol and George T. Knight (1914) Amalric believed that all people would eventually be saved and this was one of the counts upon which he was declared a heretic by Pope Innocent III.

== See also ==
- Brethren of the Free Spirit

== Sources ==
- Christoph Ulrich Hahn: Geschichte der Ketzer im Mittelalter, Vol. 3 (Stuttgart, 1850)
- Arno Borst: Religiöse und geistige Bewegungen im Hochmittelalter, Propyläen Weltgeschichte, Ullstein 1963, Vol. 5, p. 537
- Friedrich Heer Medieval World Europe 1100-1350
- Capelle, G. C., Amaury de Bène, étude sur son panthéisme formel (Paris, 1932).
- Russell, J. B., The Influence of Amalric of Bene in Thirteenth Century Pantheism (Berkeley, 1957).
