= St Bartholomew's Church, Tong =

Anglican church in Shropshire, England

- St Bartholomew's Church, Tong
- Collegiate Church of St Bartholomew, Tong; The Westminster Abbey of The Midlands
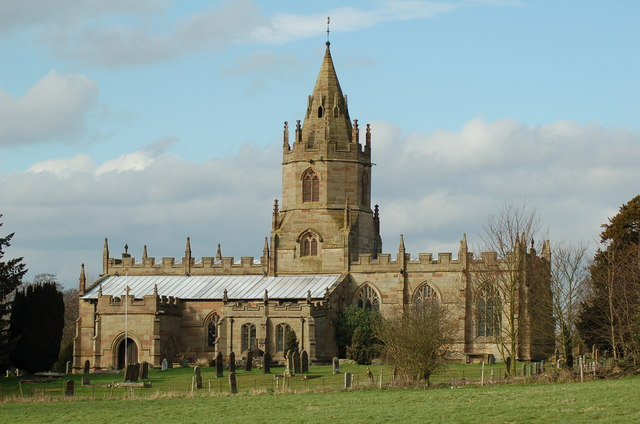
- St Bartholomew's church seen from the south

- Position within Shropshire
- OS grid reference: SJ 79567 07386
- Location: Shropshire
- Country: England
- Denomination: Church of England
- Website: St Bartholomew's, Tong, Shropshire

History
- Status: parish church
- Founder: Isabel Lingen
- Dedication: St Bartholomew

Architecture
- Functional status: Active
- Heritage designation: Grade I Listed
- Designated: 26 May 1955
- Architect: Ewan Christian (restoration)
- Style: Gothic
- Years built: 1409–1430

Specifications
- Length: 103 feet 10 inches (31.65 m)
- Height: 25 feet 9 inches (7.85 m)
- Materials: New Red Sandstone, Sherwood Sandstone Group

Administration
- Province: Canterbury
- Diocese: Lichfield
- Archdeaconry: Salop
- Deanery: Edgmond and Shifnal
- Parish: Tong

Listed Building – Grade I
- Designated: 26 May 1955
- Reference no.: 1053606

The Collegiate Church of St Bartholomew, Tong (also known as St Bartholomew's Church) is a 15th-century church in the village of Tong, Shropshire, England, notable for its architecture and fittings, including its fan vaulting in a side chapel, rare in Shropshire, and its numerous tombs. It was built on the site of a former parish church and was constructed as a collegiate church and chantry on the initiative of Isabel Lingen, who acquired the advowson from Shrewsbury Abbey and additional endowments through royal support. Patronage remained with the lords of the manor of Tong, who resided at nearby Tong Castle, a short distance to the south-west, and the tombs and memorials mostly represent these families, particularly the Vernons of Haddon Hall, who held the lordship for more than a century. Later patrons, mostly of landed gentry origin, added further memorials, including the Stanley Monument which is inscribed with epitaphs said to be specially written by William Shakespeare.

The church was the site of a minor skirmish during the English Civil War and also hosts the grave of Little Nell from Charles Dickens' The Old Curiosity Shop, despite the character being entirely fictitious. The building is grade I listed and had its lead roof replenished with steel during 2017 to deter thieves. Due to its many monuments inside the church and ornate architecture, it is sometimes labelled as The Westminster Abbey of The Midlands, often featuring as one of the best churches in The Midlands and in England.

== Earlier churches at Tong ==
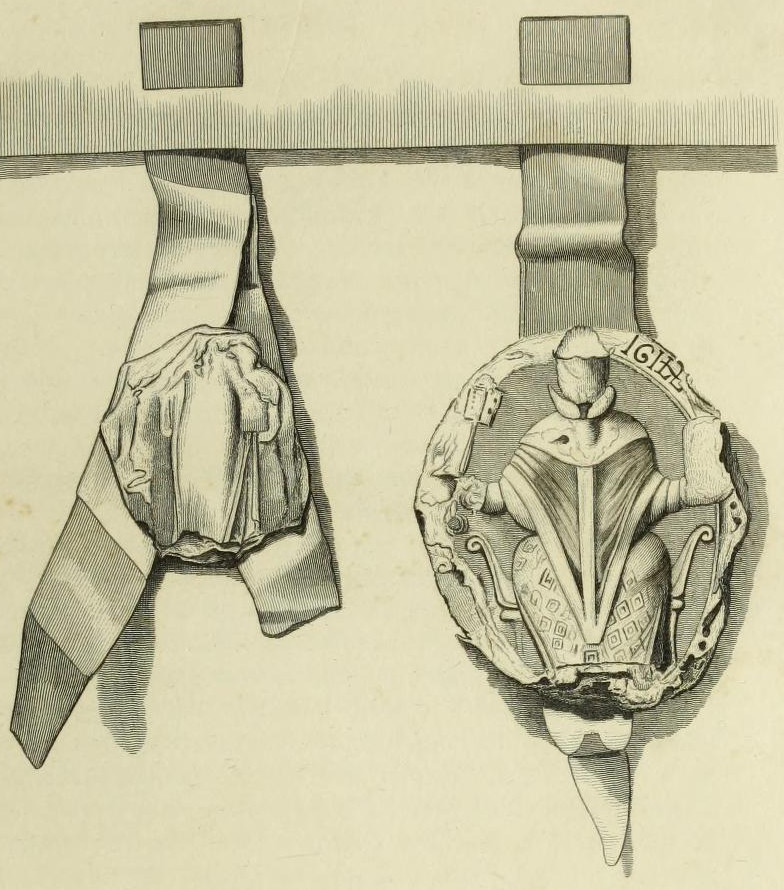
Seal of the Abbey of St Peter, Shrewsbury and a fragment of the abbot's seal, c. 1200.

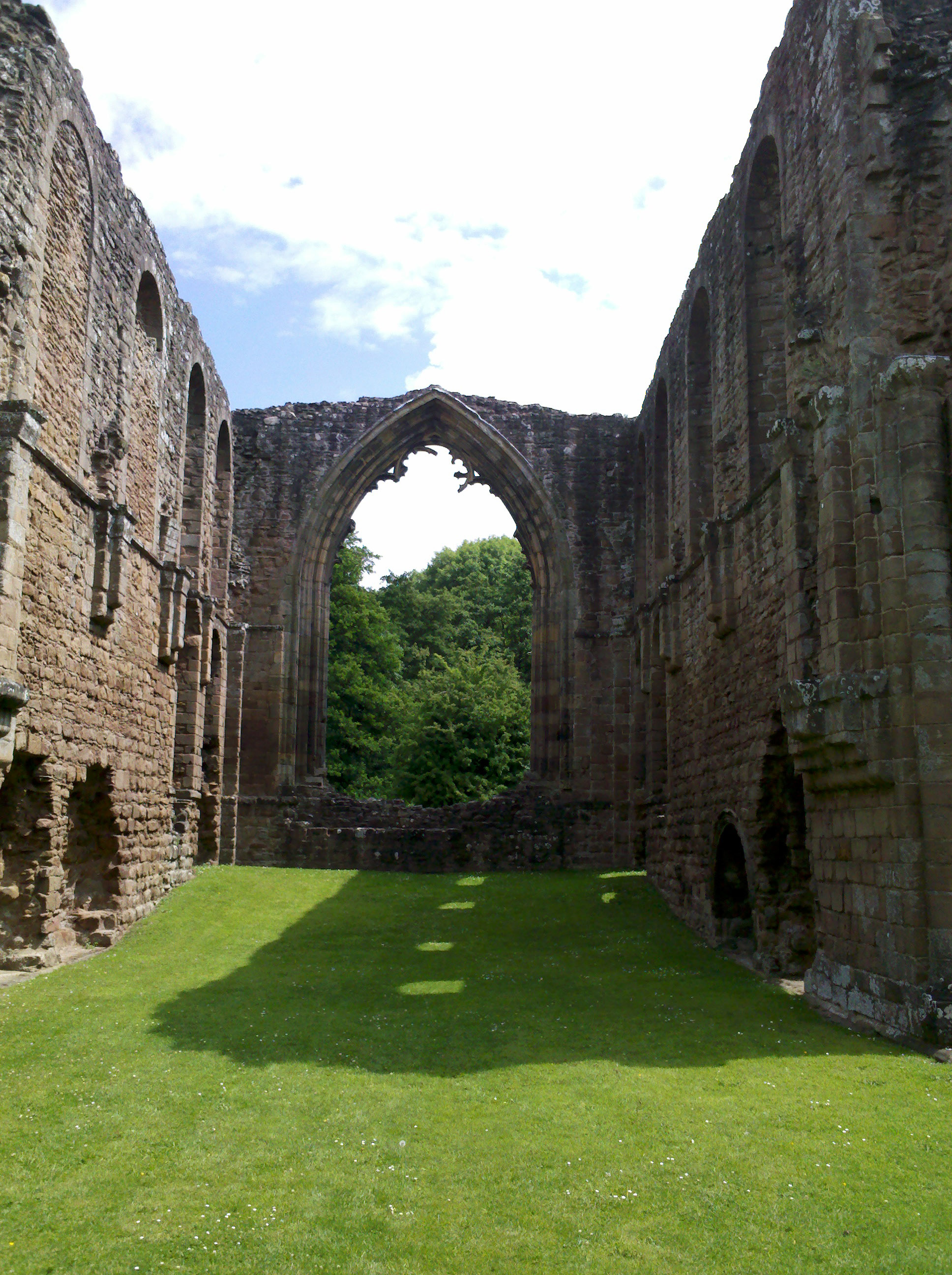
The ruined chancel of Lilleshall Abbey, close to Tong.

No church at Tong is mentioned in Domesday Book. At that point Roger de Montgomery, Earl of Shrewsbury, held the manor both as tenant-in-chief and as manorial lord. The cartulary of Shrewsbury Abbey shows that Earl Roger granted it the advowson of the church at Tong and a pension of half a mark from its income, so the church must have been built between Domesday in 1087 and his death in 1094. After Robert of Bellême, 3rd Earl of Shrewsbury forfeited his family's lands through revolt, Tong and nearby Donington were granted by Henry I to Richard de Belmeis I, his viceroy in Shropshire and the Welsh Marches, who also became Bishop of London, and who held the churches on both estates from Shrewsbury Abbey until his death in 1127. He ensured the two churches were restored to Shrewsbury Abbey on his death but his secular holdings went to his nephew Philip de Belmeis, one of the founders of Lilleshall Abbey.

After about four decades the male line of Belmeis at Tong became extinct and Alan la Zouche acquired the manor through marriage to Alicia de Belmeis. The Zouche family maintained the Belmeis link with the Augustinian abbey at Lilleshall, where they sometimes claimed advowson, rather than Benedictine Shrewsbury.

The implicit tension between secular and ecclesiastical authority came into the open under Alan's grandson, William la Zouche. William drove out Ernulf, a parish priest who had been duly presented by Shrewsbury Abbey and installed by Hugh Nonant, the Bishop of Coventry, some time between 1188 and 1194. The row appears to have blown over and Ernulf died in 1220 in full possession of Tong church. However, Ernulf's death brought to the surface a further issue. The Abbey had already sold the pension from the church and the reversion of the parsonage to Robert de Shireford. Roger la Zouche, William's brother and heir, was outraged and initiated an assize of darrein presentment against the abbot at Westminster in November 1220, aiming to prove his own right to nominate Ernulf's successor. Although the procedure was intended to simplify disputes over advowson or patronage, the legal wrangle took over a year to settle. The key issue, raised at the outset of all such cases, was who had presented the previous priest. There was no evidence that Ernulf had ever been presented by the lord of the manor and Roger had no answer to the abbot's systematic documentation of Shrewsbury Abbey's grants: the case inevitably ended in victory for the abbey.

A new church building seems to have been erected in 1260. By this time the male line of the la Zouche family at Tong had petered out and the manor was being passed through the descendants of Roger's daughter, Alice. Her daughter Orabil married Henry de Penbrigg and in 1271 the couple were granted a charter by Henry III at Winchester, allowing them to hold a weekly market at Tong on Thursdays, as well as an annual fair stretching from the eve to the morrow of St Bartholomew the Apostle (23–25 August). Henry's father, also Henry, had recently died, after losing the family's patrimony of Pembridge in Herefordshire as a result of his participation in the Second Barons' War. Hence, his main manor was now Tong and his successors were generally described as Pembrugge or Pembridge of Tong Castle. The last of these was Sir Fulk Pembridge, a very substantial landowner who was a member of the Parliament of England for Shropshire just once, in 1397. The History of Parliament avers that "Pembridge's status as a wealthy landowner is not reflected in his public service." He died in 1409 sine prole (without issue), despite two marriages. Sir Fulk had greatly expanded his lands and wealth through his first marriage to Margaret Trussell, only 14 years old when her father died in 1363 but already a widow. Margaret died in 1399. Sir Fulk's second wife, Isabel Lingen, who had been married twice before, was to survive him by 37 years. She was from the Herefordshire landed gentry, the daughter of Sir Ralph Lingen, of Wigmore, according to the History of Parliament. The inquisition for the feudal aid levied by Edward III in 1346 found a Radulphus de Lingayn holding the manors of Aymestrey and Lower Lye, close to both Lingen and Wigmore in Herefordshire: both estates belonged to the honour of Radnor and were within the large tracts of the Welsh Marches dominated by the Mortimer family of Wigmore Castle. Isabel had Tong and a large portfolio of Trussell estates settled on her for life, which was to lead to prolonged and bitter conflict between the Trussell family and Sir Fulk's heir, Richard Vernon of Haddon Hall.

== Foundation of the college ==
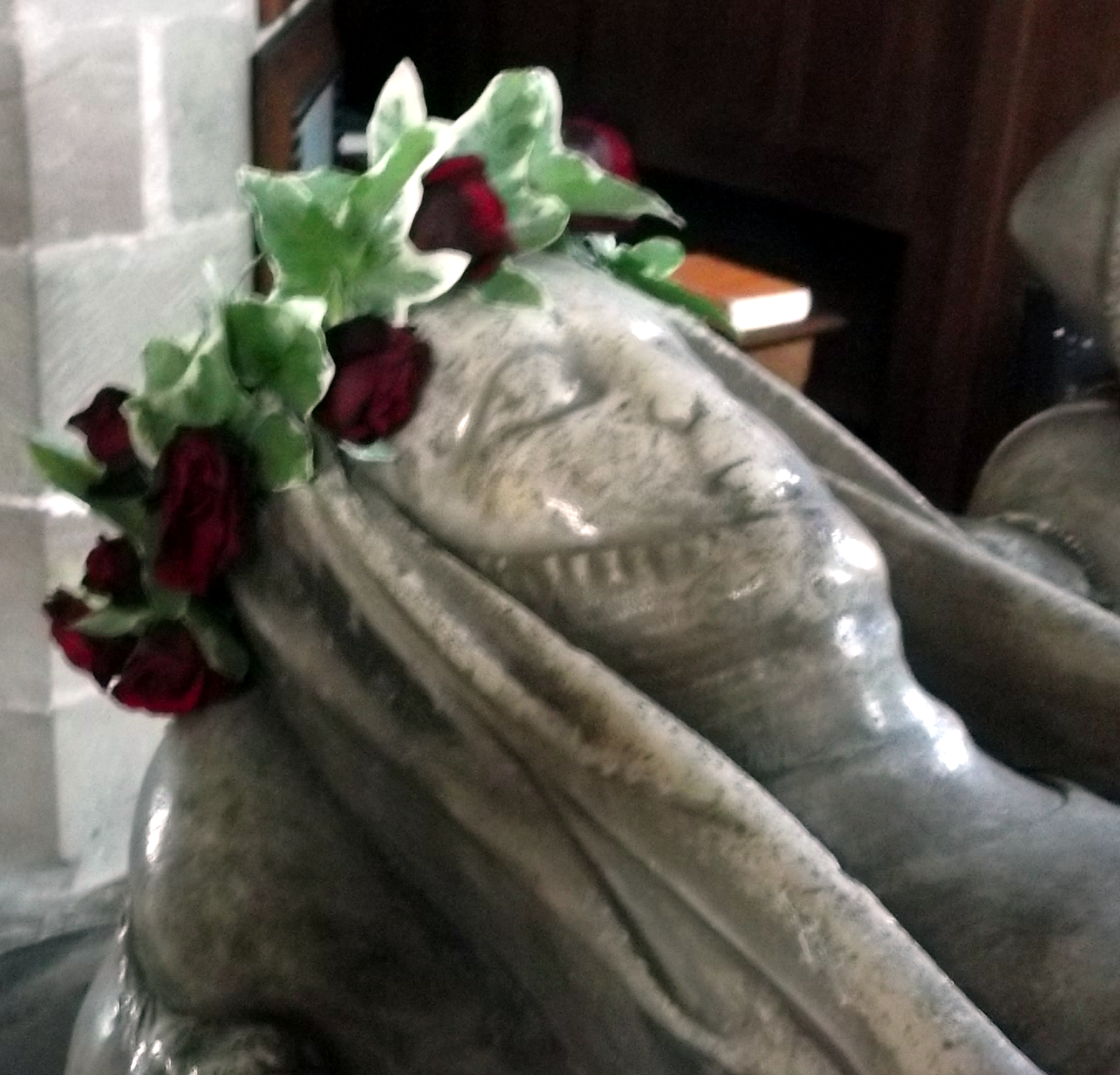
Effigy of Isabel of Lingen, adorned with a chaplet of roses and ivy, 28 June 2018

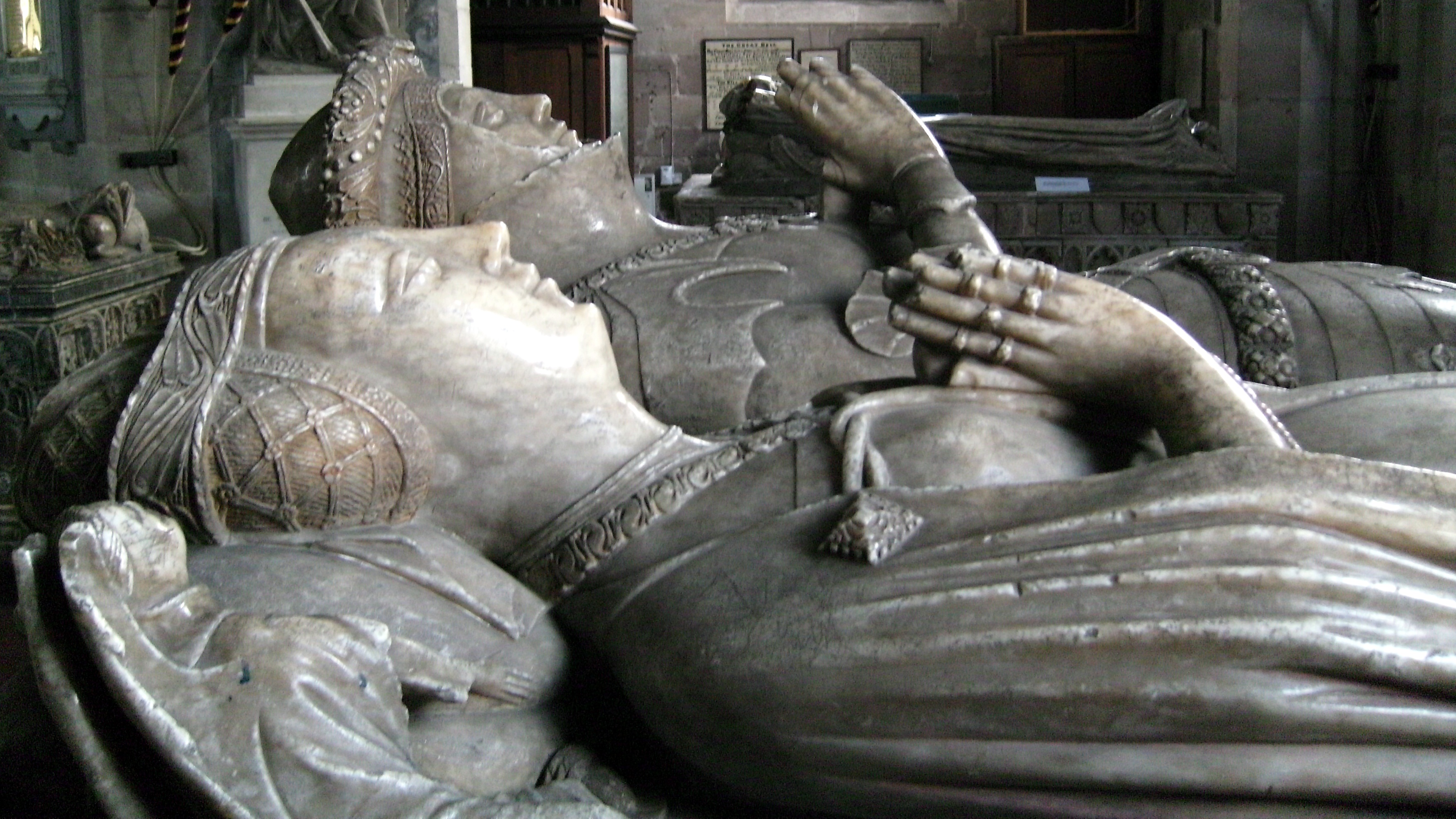
Effigies of Benedicta de Ludlow (foreground) and Sir Richard Vernon.

The present church was founded by the widowed Isabel Lingen as a chantry and collegiate church. In order to secure the new foundation, Isabel took the precaution of acquiring the advowson of the church from Shrewsbury Abbey and securing a financial basis for the foundation. This was an expensive process, with the royal licence alone, granted by Henry IV at Leicester on 25 November 1410, costing £40 (equivalent to £31,951 in 2025). Even after parting with the right to nominate the priests, the Abbey retained its token annual pension of 6s. 8d. or half a mark. Isabel applied for the licence jointly with two clerics, Walter Swan and William Mosse, who were both feoffees for Sir Fulk Pembridge. The three together donated in frankalmoin a messuage, or property with dwelling, in Tong itself, together with the advowson of St Batholomew's. Mosse gave the advowson of St Mary's Church at Orlingbury in Northamptonshire. Mosse and Swan together donated lands at Sharnford in Leicestershire: two messuages, two virgates of land and four acres of meadow. In addition the two priests gave the reversion of the manor of Gilmorton, also in Leicestershire, (Note: Given by Victoria County History as Guilden Morden in Cambridgeshire, which seems to be incorrect. Gilmorton was one of the estates inherited by Fulk Pembridge from the Trussells. See L. S. Woodger (1993). "PEMBRIDGE, Sir Fulk (d.1409), of Tong castle, Salop.". In Roskell, J. S.; Clark, C.; Rawcliffe, L. (eds.). History of the Parliament, 1386–1421: Members. London: History of Parliament Online.) which was at the time occupied by Sir William Newport and his wife Margaret: it seems that Newport himself was dead by 1417.

The new foundation was intended from the outset to be housed in a new and permanent building, as the king recognised that Isabel, Walter and William "proposed to erect, make and found the Church of Tong, mentioned above, into a certain permanent college" (prædictam ecclesiam de Tonge ... erigere, facere et fundare proponant in quoddam collegium perpetuo duraturum). The number of priests who would constitute the college was left helpfully vague: "five chaplains, more or less, of whom one is to be appointed by this Isabel, Walter and Wiliam, their heirs or assignees as warden of the same college" (quinque capellanis seu pluribus paucioribus quorum unus per ipsos Isabellam Walterum et Willielmum hæredes vel assignatos suos deputandus sit custos eiusdem collegii.) The name was specified as "the College of St Bartholomew the Apostle of Tong."

The principal purpose of Isabel's foundation was to intercede by regular masses for the souls of her three husbands: in reverse chronological order, Sir Fulke de Pembrugge or Pembridge, (Note: The spelling "Pembrugge" is one of many used in an age when orthography had not been codified: "Pembruge" and "Penbrugge" are among the variants. Elizabeth and Isabel were used interchangeably, the latter a Spanish version of the former that spread via the French and English royal families: cf. Hanks, Patrick; Hodges, Flavia; Mills, A. D.; et al., eds. (2002). The Oxford Names Companion (1 ed.). Oxford: Oxford University Press. p. 786. ISBN 0-19-860561-7.. A knight's wife was usually styled Dame, the French version of the Latin Domina – "Mistress": Lady crept in later and was sometimes applied retrospectively. Isabel was simply so-called in most contemporary documents. In Latin she is generally introduced as Isabella quæ fuit uxor Fulconis de Penbrugge militis – "Isabel who was the wife of Sir Fulk Pembridge," to distinguish her from others of the same name. She is never Lady Pembrugge, as neither the title nor the surname usage was current at the time. Her husband's name can be rendered in numerous ways, e.g. Fulco, Fulk, Fulke or Faulk. It was actually a shortened form of a range of compound names containing an element meaning "people" or "tribe": folk in modern English. Cf. Hanks et al. p. 763.) who had died only a year earlier, Sir Thomas Peytevin and Sir John Ludlow who all predeceased her. However, the list of beneficiaries is not so simple. The king had himself placed first, followed by his half-brother, Thomas Beaufort, who was at that time his Chancellor. Sir Fulk and his first wife, Margaret Trussell followed, and then Isabel's former husbands, her parents and ancestors, and finally "all the faithful departed"

The king's licence gave permission for Isabel, Walter Swan and William Mosse to grant the advowson of the college, once it was securely founded, to Richard Vernon – called in this instance Richard de Penbrugge, presumably to emphasise his kinship to Sir Fulk. In fact he was the grandson of Sir Fulk's sister, Juliana. Named alongside him was Benedicta de Ludlow, his wife, who was the daughter of Isabel of Lingen. The advowson was to pass to their heirs or, if the Vernon line failed, to a branch of the Ludlow family. However, the Vernons were to hold the advowson, along with Tong manor and castle until well into the next century. They were in this period the wealthiest of the Derbyshire gentry families, closer in income and lifestyle to the nobility than to the rest of the gentry. By the end of the century their estates across eight counties were bringing in well over £600 per year.

In addition to the college of priests, the income of the foundation was for the support of thirteen disabled poor men (tresdecem pauperum debilium). At the same time, Dame Isabel had almshouses built at the western end of the church that would house 13 people. The almshouses (also known variously as the hospital) were abandoned and rebuilt off-site in Tong village in the late 18th century. The derelict almshouses were destroyed in the 19th century by the then owner of the Tong estate, Mr George Durant. Only one of the outside walls is left standing today which is grade II listed.

== Collegiate life ==
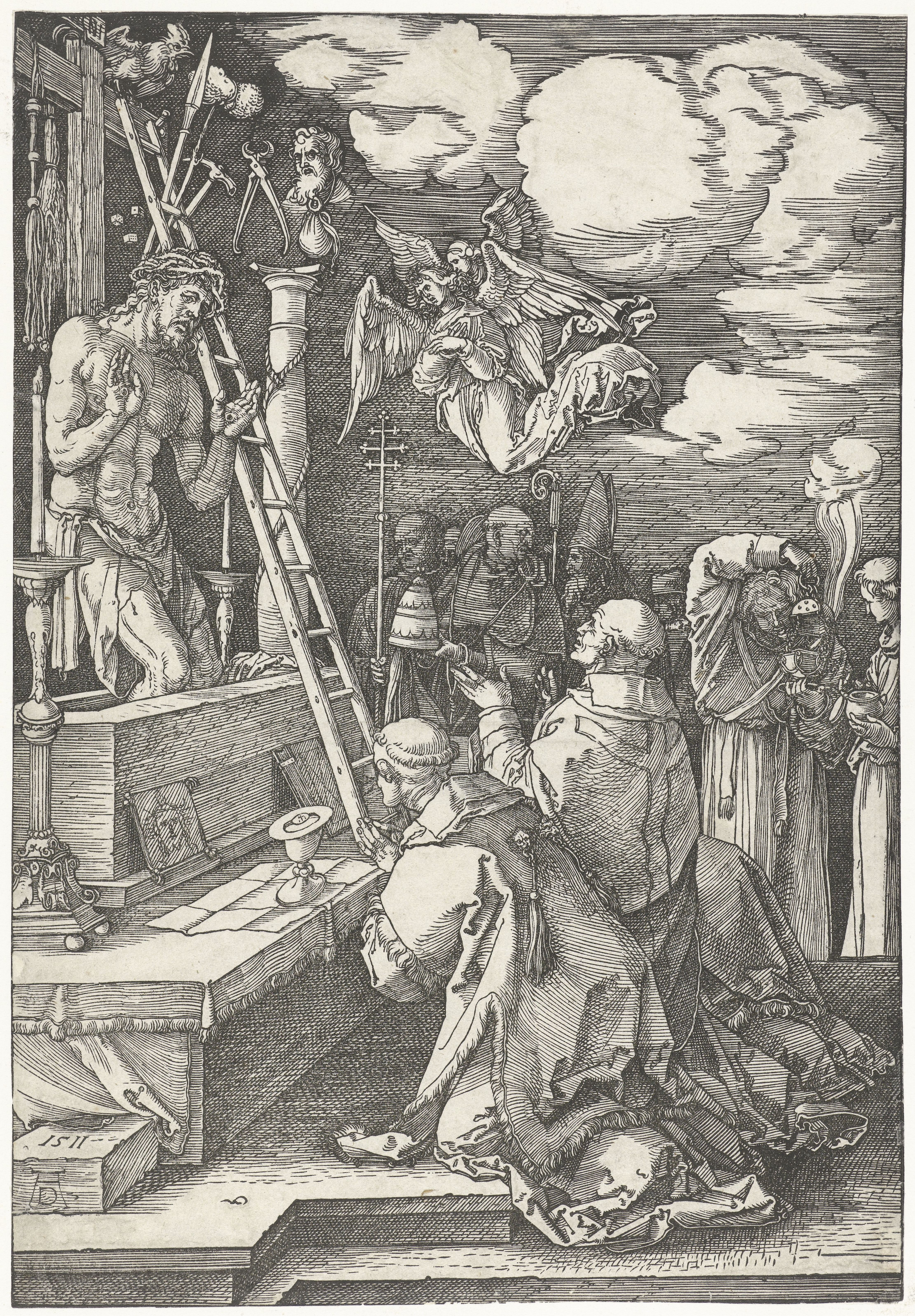
Mass of Saint Gregory by Albrecht Dürer, 1511. The Catholic understanding of the Sacrifice of the Mass and the linked doctrine of transubstantiation expressed through the legend of Pope Gregory I's vision.

The establishment of the college was rapid, with the first warden installed in March 1411. The statutes or rule for the running of the institution were approved by John Burghill, the Bishop of Coventry and Lichfield in the chapel of his manor house at Haywood on 27 March. They give a detailed picture of how the college was expected to be run.

=== Theological basis ===
The statutes insisted from the outset on the centrality of the collegiate church's rôle as a chantry, stressing the Sacrifice of the Mass as the rationale for the foundation:

Latin	English
Cum inter cætera reparationis humanæ remedia missarum officia, in quibus pro salute vivorum et requie defunctorum Patri Filius immolatur, iram Redemptoris nostri potissime mitigent et misericordiam impetrent Salvatoris, favente nobis Salvatoris clemencia, quoddam collegium perpetuum de ecclesia parochiali de Tonge, Coventr. et Lich. Diœc.	Because among other remedies for man's restoration, the offices of the Mass, in which for the salvation of the living and the rest of the dead, the Son is sacrificed to the Father, most powerfully mitigate the anger of our Redeemer, and obtain the mercy of the Saviour, the kindness of the Saviour favouring us, we have decided that a certain College shall be founded in perpetuity in the parochial Church of Tong in the Diocese of Coventry and Lichfield...

The bargain implicit in the foundation was explicitly admitted as being "to barter an earthly treasure for a heavenly." In traditional theology, a chantry mass was distinguished as exemplifying the "special fruit" made available through Christ's sacrifice and applicable at the will and intention of the priest. This made possible remission of temporal punishment, or time spent in Purgatory. Nevertheless, as at Tong, foundation deeds almost always added that the mass should also be for all the faithful departed.

This view of the mass was no longer uncontested, and John Wycliffe had taught that special applications of masses were futile. According to The Testimony of William Thorpe, the Lollard preacher had taken the pulpit at St Chad's Church, Shrewsbury on 17 April 1407 and questioned the value of all external rituals, including masses:

"As I stood there in the pulpit, busying me to teach the commandment of God, there knelled a sacring bell; and therefore many people turned away hastily, and with noise ran from me. And I, seeng this, said to them thus: 'Good men ye were better to stand here still and to hear God's word; For certes the virtue and the value of the most holy sacrament of the altar standeth much more in the belief thereof that ye ought to have in your soul, than it doth in the outward sight thereof. And therefore ye were better to stand still, quietly to hear God's word, because through the hearing thereof men come to true belief."

The document claims that Thorpe was arrested and interviewed by Thomas Prestbury, the abbot of Shrewsbury Abbey, and later by Thomas Arundel, the Archbishop of Canterbury. Thorpe's account of his preaching at St Chad's is given as his response to questions from Arundel that sought to entrap him in a denial of transubstantiation, the specific mode of Real Presence closely associated with the sacrifice of the mass, but Thorpe was not to be drawn on that subject.

The college statutes reiterate the orthodox faith of the Western Catholic Church in the face of incipient revolt: the mass is a sacrifice in which the priest offers up the Son to the Father, a re-enactment of the Crucifixion, and it contributes to both the well-being of the living and the freeing of the dead. The three husbands of Isabel Lingen, with all their ancestor and descendants, were to be the chief beneficiaries of the special fruits of masses at Tong, listed immediately after the king and his heirs: no mention is made at the beginning of the statutes of Beaufort or even of Isabel's own family. Pious works on behalf of the college also attract reward: all the faithful departed are included as beneficiaries of the masses, but with the proviso that this applies especially to "those who shall have given any assistance or regard to the support of the said college."

=== Membership and management of the college ===
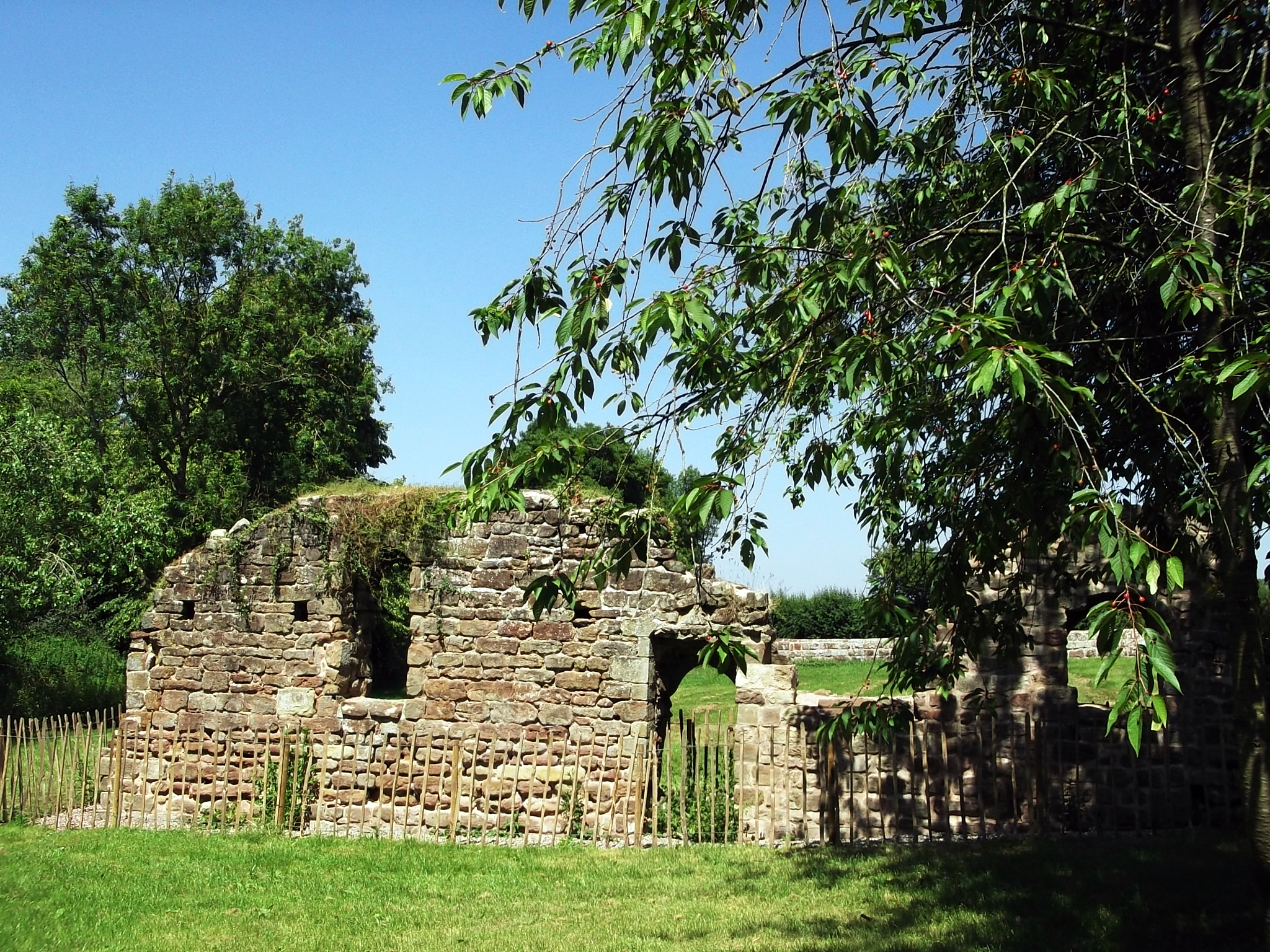
Remains of former almshouses from the south. St Bartholomew's Church, Tong, Shropshire.

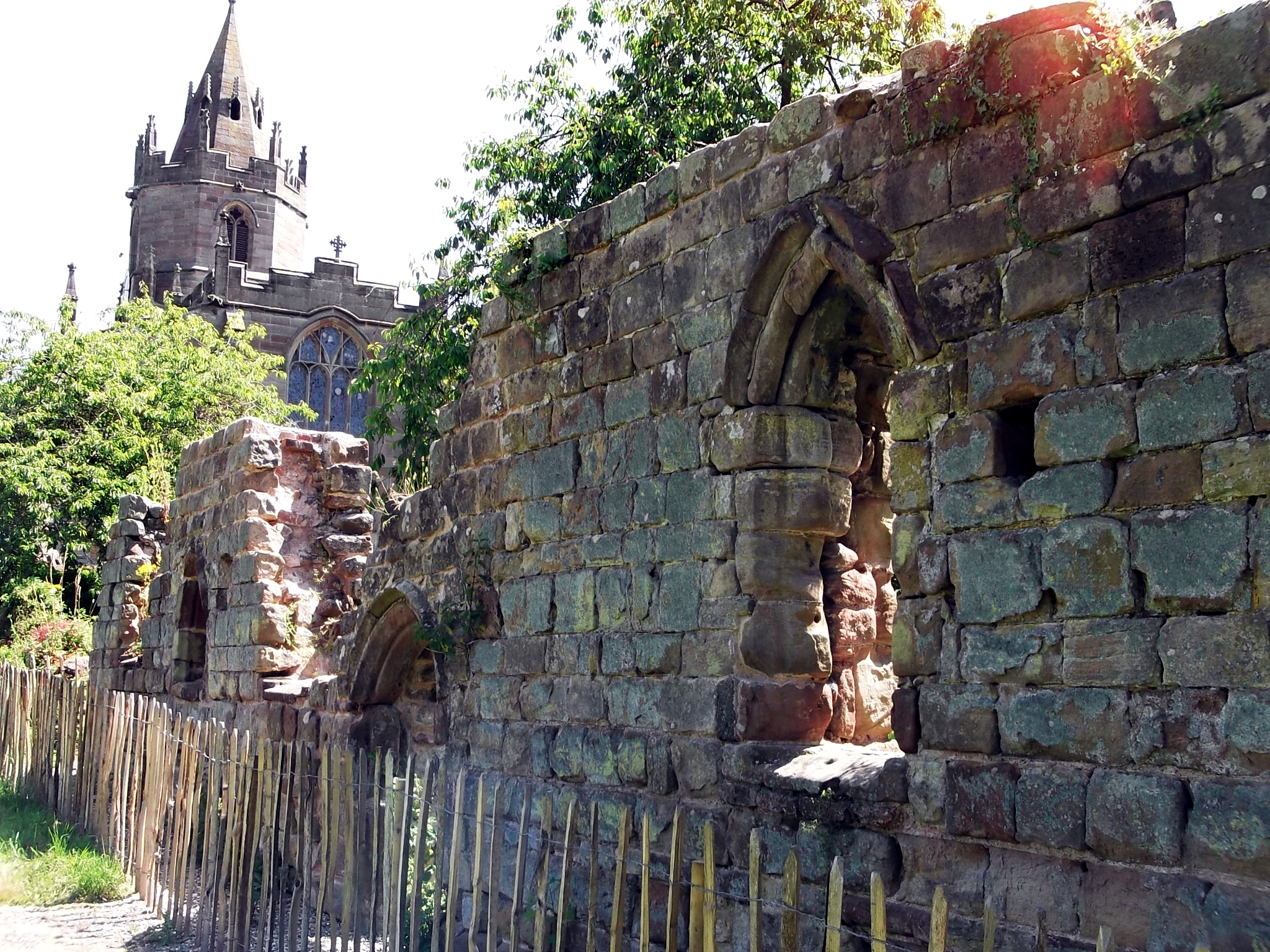
Remains of former almshouses from the north west corner.

The statutes list the constituents of the college. The five priests were to be secular clergy and, with the exception of the warden, they must not hold any other benefice. The warden was to preside over the college and to receive obedience from the other chaplains, as well as having cure of souls of both the college and the parishioners. There was also to be a sub-warden, a deputy elected by consensus who could be removed at will – unlike the warden, whose tenure of office was perpetual. There were to be two assistant clerics, serving at the behest of the warden, who might be in minor orders, as it was stipulated only that they be in prima saltem tonsura constituti – "at least instituted in their first tonsure." At the dissolution of the college in 1546 they were described as "laye men named deacons," which reflects a changed perception of minor orders. Finally there were to be 13 poor men, of whom seven must be seriously ill or severely disabled: "so weak and worn in strength that they can scarcely or never help themselves without the assistance of another." Once admitted and settled, they were not to be removed without good cause, which must be proved to the satisfaction of at least a majority of the five chaplains.

The warden was to be the nominee of Isabel while she lived. After her death he was to elected unanimously from among the chaplains, without canvassing, at a meeting convened for that purpose in the chapter house. The letter informing the bishop of the election was to be passed via the patron, Richard Vernon in the event if Isabel's death, and he was to levy no payment. However, the patron could nominate a warden if the chapter did not make a unanimous decision within fifteen days of a vacancy. Almost all eventualities were covered: in the event that the patron made no nomination within four months, the bishop would have the choice or, failing him, the archbishop or, as a last resort, the chapter of Canterbury Cathedral. An equally prolix regression applied to the bishop who should induct the warden. Similarly if there should be no warden or a negligent warden, there were provisions for making up he number of chaplains in case of a vacancy.

The newly elected warden had to swear an oath before the chapter, with his hand on a book of the gospels, to administer faithfully and to maintain the statutes. Similarly, the warden was to take an oath of obedience from chaplains when they had completed their first year in the college, which was probationary. The oath covered not just liturgical duties, but all reasonable instructions from the warden, and contained a confidentiality clause. The chaplains swore never to do any harm to the college. The warden was to ensure that the rules were collated and recorded, to take up difficult issues with the advice of the brothers but also "to build up and encourage charity and peace" not only in the chapter but also among the servants. Above all he was "to behave and conduct himself that he may give an upright and fearless account concerning his way of life before God and man." He was also to account fully for the financial position of the college. He was expected to take an inventory not just of goods, but also debts and credits. This was to read to the chaplains so that they understood the situation. It was to written up in the form of an indenture, with one half to be kept by himself and the other by another chaplain for future reference. This was so that an evaluation could be made of his financial performance in office and it was expected that he would leave the college in a better state than when he took over. In the same way, he was expected to take responsibility for the annual accounts and to present them to the chapter.

Benefit of clergy meant that the chaplains were answerable to the warden for all offences: not merely breaches of the statutes but also serious crimes. Homicide was deemed too serious for the perpetrator to continue in office, even after penance, and he would be expelled. Adultery, incest, perjury, false witness, sacrilege, theft and robbery would not merit expulsion, so long as due confession and penance were undertaken, and an oath sworn never to offend again. Lesser crimes included fornication, disobedience, rebellion, brawling, insolence, gluttony and drunkenness. These would result in expulsion only if repeated three times or if the penance were to be ignored. The thirteen poor men were under similar discipline to the college. The warden himself could be denounced to the bishop by the other chaplains if, after a complaint and reprimand from his chaplains, he offended a second time.

=== Spiritual and liturgical life ===
Confession was an essential part of Penance and Reconciliation, which was itself part of the preparation for Eucharist, a central part of the daily routine in a chantry. The warden was expected to hear the chaplains' confessions whenever they invited him to do so – in any event, at least once a year. This was a reciprocal arrangement: the warden was to choose a confessor from among the chaplains. Moreover, the chaplains were to hear each other's confessions "in the way that they know is most helpful for the salvation of their souls." This was to be done in a specific place of confession. In Latin this is given as in confessionis foro, a forum implying a very public place, not in any way like the modern confessional. Auden translates it as "hall of confession." It was confidently expected that the bishop would grant the warden full powers to impose penance on the chaplains, but the warden was to be equally subject to his own confessor. Possibly it is for this reason that the statutes now tell us that the warden was allowed to take one of the other chaplains with him if he had business outside the college: he was allowed to keep two horses so that the other chaplain could ride alongside him.

It was the sub-warden who had responsibility for maintaining the liturgical life of the college. For this reason he was in charge of and accountable for all the books and ornaments. He was responsible for the timetable and rota of liturgical duties. He was to make a note of absentees and present it at the next chapter. He was responsible for the provision of all the requisites for Eucharist: bread, wine, wax, oil, cruets, towels, etc. The statutes recognised that this double rôle of precentor and sacrist was too much for one man and he was to have an assistant from among the two clerics who were additional to the chapter. This assistant or sub-sacrist was to ring the bell for worship, both for the canonical hours and the masses. He also kept one half of the sub-warden's inventory indenture, so that there was independent check on his stock-keeping.

In principle, all the chaplains were to attend every act of worship in the collegiate church. The aim was not just to ensure that the services were celebrated honourably. The constant round of activity was a form of pastoral care, as it helped to drive away "the worst of vices, despondency." This was accidia or acedia – neglect, lack of concern, absence of appetite for life – classified as one of the Seven deadly sins. It was recognised that business might sometimes take the warden out of the church and there were dispensations for sickness. Each chaplain was also allowed a month's holiday a year but could not take it in one block. There was to be no absence from the major festivals, which were celebrated according to the Use of Sarum. Absences were punishable by a fine on each occasion unless taken by permission of the warden or sub-warden. The chaplains were to lose one penny for each absence from Matins, mass or Vespers and half a penny for other canonical hours. The clerks were to be fined only half as much as the chaplains.

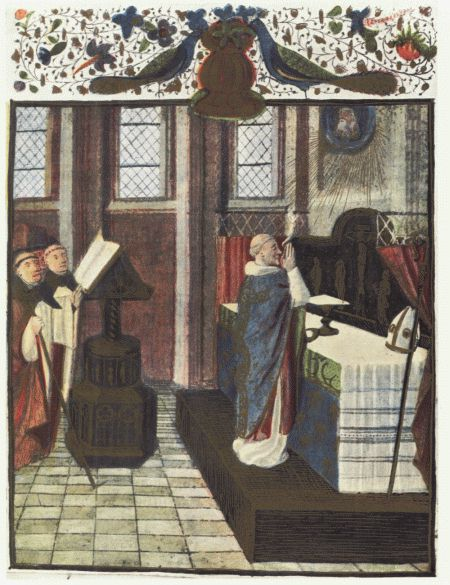
15th century high mass, in which the celebrant was assisted by a deacon and sub-deacon.

All of the canonical hours were to be celebrated according to the Sarum rite, from the heart and with a clear voice – corde et voco distincte. The bell for Matins (Note: The Matins for the dead, as recited in chantries, was generally known as Dirige) was rung at or before daybreak. Like all the hours, Matins might be said or sung, as directed by the warden, although music was obligatory on Sundays and other festivals so long as there were enough assistants. Immediately afterwards a mass according to the Little Office of the Blessed Virgin Mary was to begin on the north side of the church. This was recited by the chaplain named for the week on the sub-warden's rota. All the others chaplains, except the warden, were expected to attend, unless they had another mass to read elsewhere in the church. There might be a number of these additional masses, and they would always include one for the founders and benefactors of the church. At this point in the statutes Isabel, William and Walter for the first time insert their own names among those deserving such masses. A founder's mass was to include a special collect which began: Deus, cui proprium est misereri semper, et parcere, propitiare (Note: There is a misprint in the text reproduced in Auden's documents which has been corrected from Dugdale's Monasticon. The phrase is part of the Catholic Litany of the Saints and is quoted in the Anglican Prayer of Humble Access.) – "God, whose nature and property is ever to have mercy and to forgive and be gracious." Later the priest nominated for that week would celebrate High Mass. This was to include the Collects as laid down by the Sarum Rite. On Sundays there would be an address to the parishioners in English. A further themed mass was prescribed for each day of the week: a Corpus Christi mass on Thursday, for example, and a Requiem on Saturday.

The paupers of the almshouses were not compelled to attend all the complex calendar of services. However, they were normally expected to hear one or two masses each day, alongside the college. In addition they were to say the Lord's Prayer and the Angelical salutation fifteen times and the Apostles' Creed three times each day. On Sunday, Wednesday and Friday there was to be a mass in the chapel at the poor house if there were any inmates unable to attend the church.

In the evening the Vespers bell would ring and the chaplains would say the office for the dead, a combination known as a Dirige. Compline would follow Vespers and after it there would be a Marian Antiphon: Salve Regina is suggested, although a wider range of Marian hymns might be used at festivals.

Special anniversaries were to be celebrated for Isabel's husbands and parents. For Sir Fulk Pembridge and his first wife, Margaret Trussell, this was the day after the feast of St Augustine of Canterbury, 27 May. For Sir John Ludlow it was on the feast of St Margaret the Virgin, 20 July. Sir Thomas Peytevin was commemorated on 15 November, the feast of St Machutus or Malo, one of the founding saints of Brittany. For Isabel's parents, Ralph Lingen and Margery, it was St Andrew's Day, 30 November. Isabel herself, together with William Mosse and Walter Swan, were each to be commemorated after death by a Dirige or Vespers of the Dead on the anniversary and a mass the following day.

The correct vestments for the chaplains were carefully prescribed. These had to be bought by the chaplains themselves, although there was provision for an advance to be made of the first year's stipend in case of need. This had to be repaid if the chaplain did not complete his probationary year. Not appearing in the correct vestments was counted as an absence and attracted the same fine.

=== Life in community ===
The warden and chaplains were expected to have a life in common and without undue distraction. They lived in a single building and it was laid down that their rooms were to be large, although they might vary according to rank. The keys to the dormitory building were to be guarded by the warden or sub-warden at night. Meals too were to be taken at a common table, in the shared college building and nowhere else, unless by express permission of the warden. At the beginning of meals the food would be blessed by the warden or the priest who conducted that day's high mass. Dinner should be accompanied by a reading from Scripture. Meals ended with a prayer of thanks and prayers for the souls of the founders and benefactors. It was envisaged that the college's income would rise and that a chaplain would be appointed as steward to manage the quantity and quality of the meals, keeping a weekly account. However, the actual purchasing was to done centrally and seasonally. Outsiders were allowed to take part in the meals only in strictly limited numbers and women were allowed only if of unimpeachable reputation and for the best of reasons: the key point was to minimise distraction from the purpose of the college. All such guests had to be paid for by the chaplain who had invited them, although the cost would be shared if the guest had been invited for the whole college. There was a high table and a low, possibly referring to the quality of provision rather than a distinct piece of furniture, and the cost of dining differed accordingly. All meal charges were to be returned to the food budget. Chaplains might entertain holidaying visitors for a day or two, with the warden's permission, but they were to be accommodated away from the college. The chaplains were particularly warned against the distractions of hunting and hawking. They were not allowed to keep dogs without the unanimous permission of the college and offenders were liable to peremptory expulsion. (Note: The possibility of religious communities creating disturbance by hunting was not far-fetched. Alice Harley, prioress of White Ladies Priory, a few miles from Tong, was reprimanded for precisely that in the previous century. Cf. Angold et al. Priory of St Leonard, Brewood, note anchor 24.) The chaplains were exhorted to wear decent dress even when off the premises and it was recommended that they adopt uniform clothing, to be supplied annually, when meeting outsiders.

Tomb of Thomas Forster, 16th century Prior of Wombridge (mentioned 1510), Warden of Tong College (resigned 1515) and Vicar of Shifnal. St Andrew's Church, Shifnal.

=== Other activities ===
The warden had the cure of souls not only of the college, but of the whole parish. It was recognised that this might be more than he could manage alone, so he was to select another member of the chapter as parochial chaplain to assist in the work, especially the administration of the sacraments. Another of the chaplains or one of the clerics was to become a teacher under the direction of the warden and chapter. He needed to be capable in reading, singing and grammar. His responsibilities were wide-ranging, as he was expected to teach the clerks, the employees of the college, the poor children of the village and even children from neighbouring villages.

=== Pay and conditions ===
The warden was assigned an annual stipend of ten marks while the chaplains received only four marks. This was, however, in addition to their boarding costs, which were borne by the college as a whole. They were also able to receive additional payments for masses after deaths of parishioners and others, including trentals (30-day masses) and obits (anniversary masses), as well as bequests. All of these were added to the stipend and paid in two annual installments: on the Feast of the Annunciation (25 March) and Michaelmas (29 September). The sub-warden, the parochial curate and the steward were each assigned an extra half mark, so long as they performed their duties conscientiously. The salaries of the other clerics and any choristers were not fixed in advance but subject to negotiation with the warden. The thirteen poor people were allowed one mark in money or in kind, in addition to their accommodation, although it was hoped this could be increased as the college income rose. They were paid in four installments annually.

In addition to these payments, the warden was made responsible for maintaining an oil lamp, to be kept lit during services and at night, before the High Altar, as well as all necessary wax candles. He was accountable to the bishop for meeting all these expenses. Certain dealings and payments were categorically forbidden and would make the warden liable to dismissal. These included pensions and corrodies (a form of annuity guaranteeing living costs): these were the undoing of the great neighbouring abbey of Lilleshall, which had great numbers of royal servants added to its payroll. However the chaplains themselves were to be fed and clothed even in old age and infirmity, unless they had at least six marks from outside rents of their own to live on.

Any chaplain could resign from the college but he had to give six months notice. If he failed to complete this stay, he would lose his final half year's pay.

== Endowments and resources ==
Relief map of Staffordshire, showing locations of estates in the county held by Lapley Priory.

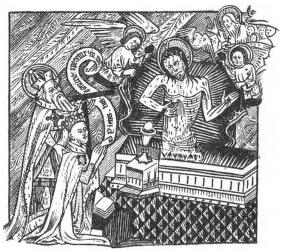
Henry V of England shown kneeling before an image of the Man of Sorrows. He is thus assimilated to the legend of the Mass of Saint Gregory.

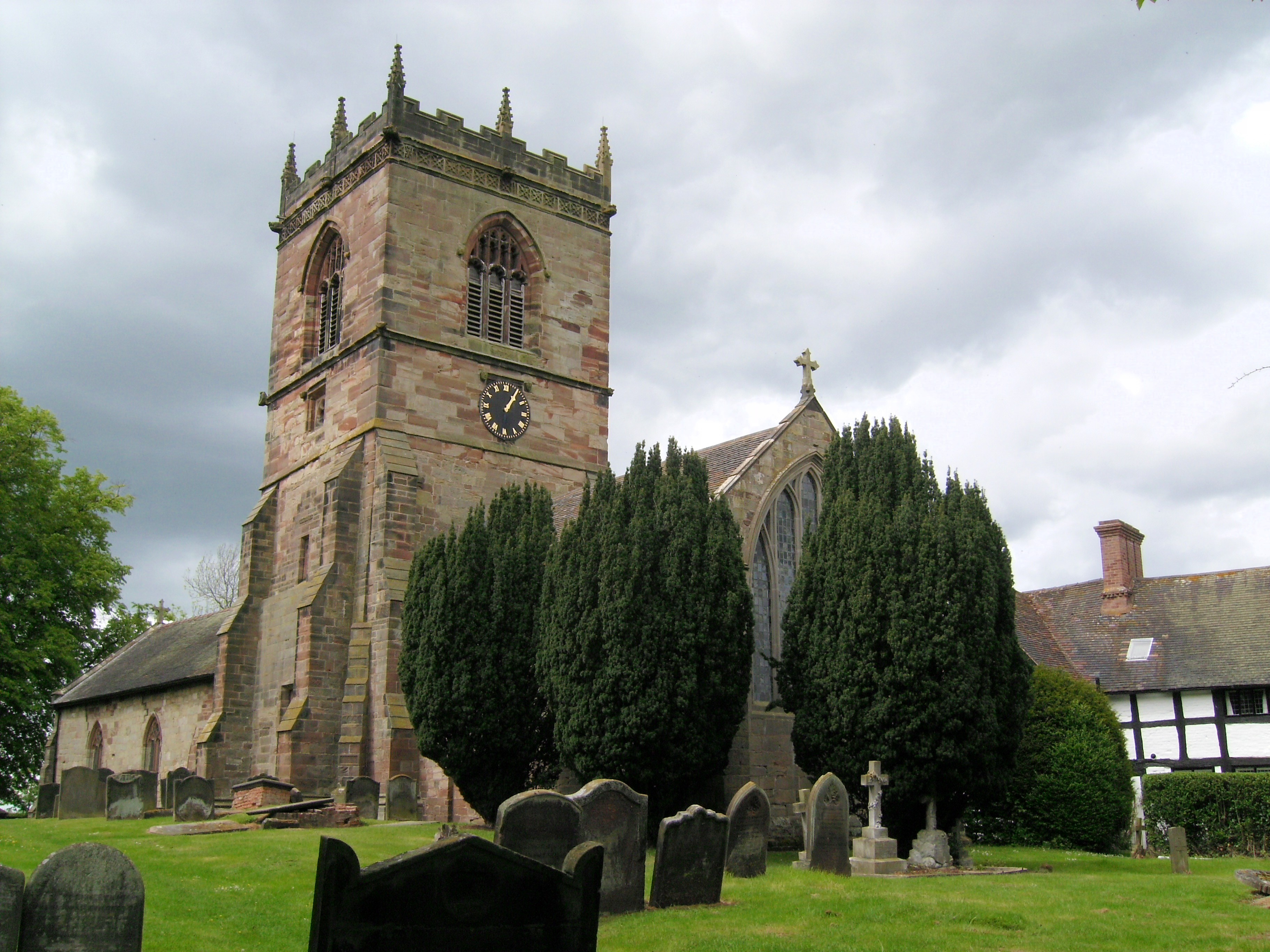
All Saints Church, Lapley. Much of the building goes back to the 12th century, around the time the priory was established. The priory stood on the site of the timber-framed manor house, behind the church.

Tong College's statutes envisaged it having to work within the financial bounds of its original endowments: at Tong itself, Orlingbury, Sharnford and Gilmorton. These were not large and the wait to profit from potentially the most lucrative of them, the manor of Gilmorton, was unpredictable.

=== Lapley grant ===
The situation was greatly improved by Henry V's grant to the college of Lapley Priory in 1415, which allowed for an optimistic revision of the statutes in 1423. Lapley was an alien priory, a monastery subject to a mother house abroad – in its case the Abbey of Saint-Remi at Reims. As Reims Abbey came under the rule of the King of France, and was a location of great ideological and historical importance to the monarchy of France, Lapley Priory had been regularly confiscated and exploited by kings of England during their French wars ever since the reign of King John. The Fire and Faggot Parliament, held at Leicester in 1414, petitioned the king to take over definitively all the alien priories that were not self-governing and he reassured the parliament that this would be so. His grant of Lapley to Tong College, dated 19 June 1415 and made in response to a request from Isabel Lingen, reiterates that it was in accordance with an ordinance of the Leicester parliament and mentions that he had since let the priory to the former prior, John Bally, and two others. The king points out the great damage done to the national economy by constant remittances to foreign monasteries. A considerable part of the rents and dues was already committed. Lapley had been made to contribute 12 marks annually towards the huge dowry granted by Henry IV to Joan of Navarre, Queen of England, which was still partly outstanding: Henry V was not inclined to reduce his mother's income. A further £20 was being paid to a John Vale, an esquire, and this too was to continue. The king added a number of other names to the list of those whose souls were to benefit from the masses said at Tong. Firstly he added himself; then Henry Beaufort, Bishop of Winchester, another of his uncles, alongside Thomas Beaufort, now Earl of Dorset; finally, John Prophet, the Dean of York, an important figure in his own administration and in his father's.

Despite the king's piety and the pious intentions of the college and chantry, the letters patent signifying the grant cost Isabel £100, deposited in the hanaper. Although there were additional outgoings and responsibilities, the grant was substantial. Lapley had desmesne lands around the priory and village of Lapley, not far from Tong on the western edge of Staffordshire, as well as further estates at Hamstall Ridware, Meaford, and Marston in Church Eaton, all in Staffordshire, and at Silvington in Shropshire. At Lapley itself, Tong acquired not just the priory building and its surrounding lands, but the advowson and tithes of the parish church, although there was a need to find money for the vicar and for the poor of Lapley. About 25 years after Henry V's grant, the Lapley estates were contributing about half the total income of the college.

This upturn in the fortunes of the college brought about a revision of the statutes in 1423. The new statutes raised the warden's stipend from ten marks to £10 and that of the chaplains from four marks to £5. The higher stipends, however, were not paid and the old rate for chaplains, given as 53. 4d., was still in force at the Valor Ecclesiasticus of 1535 and at the inquiry preceding dissolution in 1546. Aged chaplains were allowed to remain at the college even if they had means of their own. The lord of the manor and the head of the Fraternity of All Saints, a religious guild, took over responsibility for the almshouses. The college warden was to hand over £20 a year to the guild wardens towards the support of the inmates, an amount still recorded in 1535.

=== Demesne agriculture ===
Tong College was founded in a period when demesne cultivation had been in decline for more than a century and it continued to decline further. Even monasteries and religious houses generally sought to replace agriculture with less labour-intensive stock rearing and to lease out uneconomic parts of their demesnes. Most of Tong College's estates were leased and brought in annual rent but it seems that there were demesne lands around Lapley and Wheaton Aston that were always kept in the hands of the college and provided it with at least a subsistence. Around 1440 the demesne required five employees and produced enough grain, meat and dairy products to feed the college. In 1438 the college had 92 sheep and was able to sell wool, although this was the only commodity produced for the market. There were 11 oxen, presumably the main draft animal, and six horses but few cattle. The inquisition on the eve of dissolution found adequate stocks of agricultural produce in the barns. As well as wheat and rye valued at £3 10s. in the main barns (probably at Lapley), there was a further 20s. worth of wheat at Wheaton Aston. There were also quantities of barley and oats and mixed grains, dredge (oats and barley) and muncorn (a general term for rye mixtures, but usually with wheat). Along with the hay supply, this suggests crops were stored for animal feed as well as for bread. However, the number of animals had declined considerably, with just two oxen, two cows and 36 sheep. There were, however, eleven pigs and a few poultry, almost certainly intended for consumption by the college and residents of the almshouses.

=== Further gains ===
In 1448 the college, together with Sir Richard Vernon, still lord of the manor, acquired by royal charter a range of privileges giving a wide measure of legal autonomy. This included waif and stray (the right to unclaimed goods and cattle), treasure trove, the goods of fugitives, convicts and suicides. The college was to execute royal writs and mandates, to the exclusion of the sheriff, escheator, coroner and other royal officials. This extended even to justices of the peace: the college and manorial lord were to appoint their own, who were to have the same powers as the justices mandated by the king for the county, although they would require a licence from the king before determining a felony.

There were to be no further large acquisitions. However, by the time of the Valor Ecclesiasticus of 1535, two small estates had been added: the college held a fifth of the nearby manor of Weston-under-Lizard, which brought in £2 a year, and some land at Wellington, Shropshire, worth 6s. 8d. However, the total income from the college's temporalities at that time was £33 16s. 6d., of which £22 15s. 10d., two thirds, came from the manor of Lapley.

=== Wills and gifts ===
The college and its chaplains made irregular additional income from bequests. In 1451, for example, William FitzHerbert, who had already resided in the college for some years, made Richard Eyton, the warden, and Agnes Hereward his executors, with responsibility for disposing for any of his goods remaining after his bequests had been carried out. He instructed that eight pounds of wax candles be burnt at his funeral. As well as gifts of 3s. 4. and 6s. 8. to the clerics of the college, he left the substantial sum of 100s. or £5 for a priest to celebrate mass for his soul for one year and 8d. A year for four years for the parish chaplain to mention his name in prayer from the pulpit. In 1454 Fulk Eyton, godson of Sir Fulk Pembridge and brother of the warden, asked to be buried in the lady chapel and left 4d for each of 5000 commemoration, to consist of a Placebo, a Dirige and a mass. He left a silver basin and a feather bed to the college, on condition that further prayers, masses and Diriges be sung in return. The will of John Mytton of Weston, 21 December 1499, left money specifically for the building of the church.

=== Lands and rights ===
Lands and churches known to have been held by Tong College are listed below.

List of Tong College's assets
Location	Donor or original owner	Acquisition date	Nature of property	Approximate coordinates
Tong	Isabel Lingen, Walter Swan, William Mosse	1410	Advowson of Tong church and a single messuage with its belongings.	52°39′50″N 2°18′13″W
Orlingbury	William Mosse	1410	Advowson of St Mary's Church.	52°20′33″N 0°44′23″W
Sharnford	Walter Swan, William Mosse	1410	Two messuages, two yardlands, four acres of meadow.	52°31′23″N 1°17′16″W
Gilmorton	Walter Swan, William Mosse	1410	Reversion of the manor.	52°29′09″N 1°09′33″W
Lapley	Given to Abbey of Saint-Remi at Reims by Burchard, the son of Ælfgar, Earl of Mercia, before the Norman conquest of England. Recorded as held by the Abbey in Domesday Book. Granted to Tong College by Henry V with Lapley Priory.	1415	Advowson and tithes of the church. Priory building and land incorporated into Tong's demesne.	52°42′51″N 2°11′25″W
Marston	A gift of Burchard to Lapley Priory. Held by Godwin before 1066 but by two men with St Remi as tenant-in-chief in Domesday.	1415	Small agricultural estate	52°43′20″N 2°14′43″W
Hamstall Ridware	A gift of Burchard. One of the Lapley estates held as tenant-in-chief by St. Remi in Domesday.	1415	Small agricultural estate.	52°46′14″N 1°50′42″W
Meaford	A gift of Burchard. One of the Lapley estates held as tenant-in-chief by St. Remi in Domesday.	1415	Small agricultural estate.	52°55′01″N 2°10′20″W
Silvington	A gift of Burchard. One of the Lapley estates managed directly by St. Remi in Domesday.	1415	Small agricultural estate.	52°24′55″N 2°33′30″W
Wheaton Aston	A village in Lapley parish with a dependent chapel, appropriated by Lapley with approval from Bishop Walter Langton in 1319.	1415	Advowson and tithes of St Mary's Church. Land which probably became part of Tong's demesne.	52°42′38″N 2°13′15″W
Weston-under-Lizard	Unknown, but manorial lords were the Mytton family.	By 1535	One fifth of the manor.	52°41′44″N 2°17′17″W
Wellington	Unknown	By 1535	Very small agricultural estate.	52°42′08″N 2°31′01″W

== Vernon's chantry ==
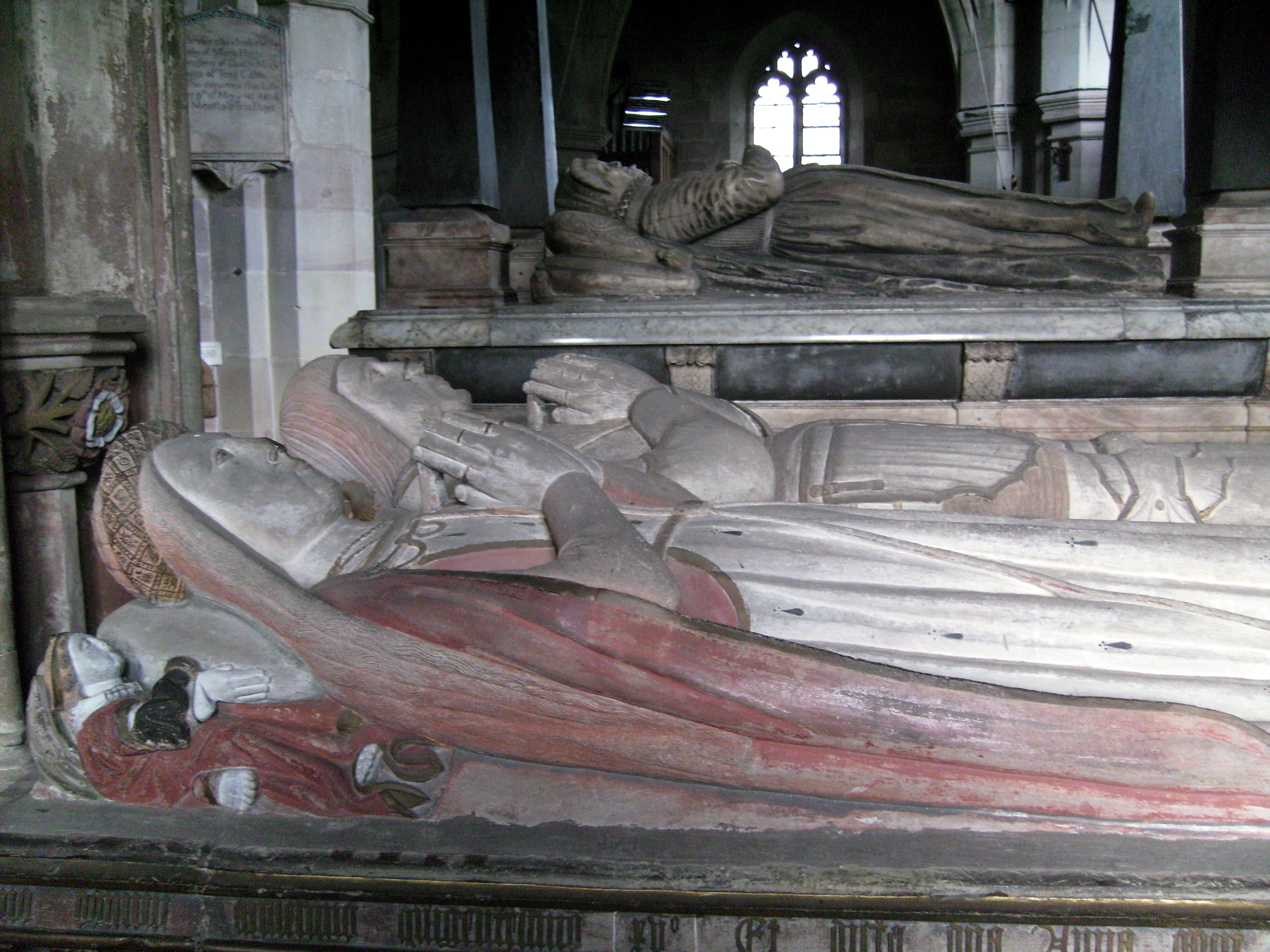
Effigies of Anne Talbot and Sir Henry Vernon (foreground) on their tomb at Tong.

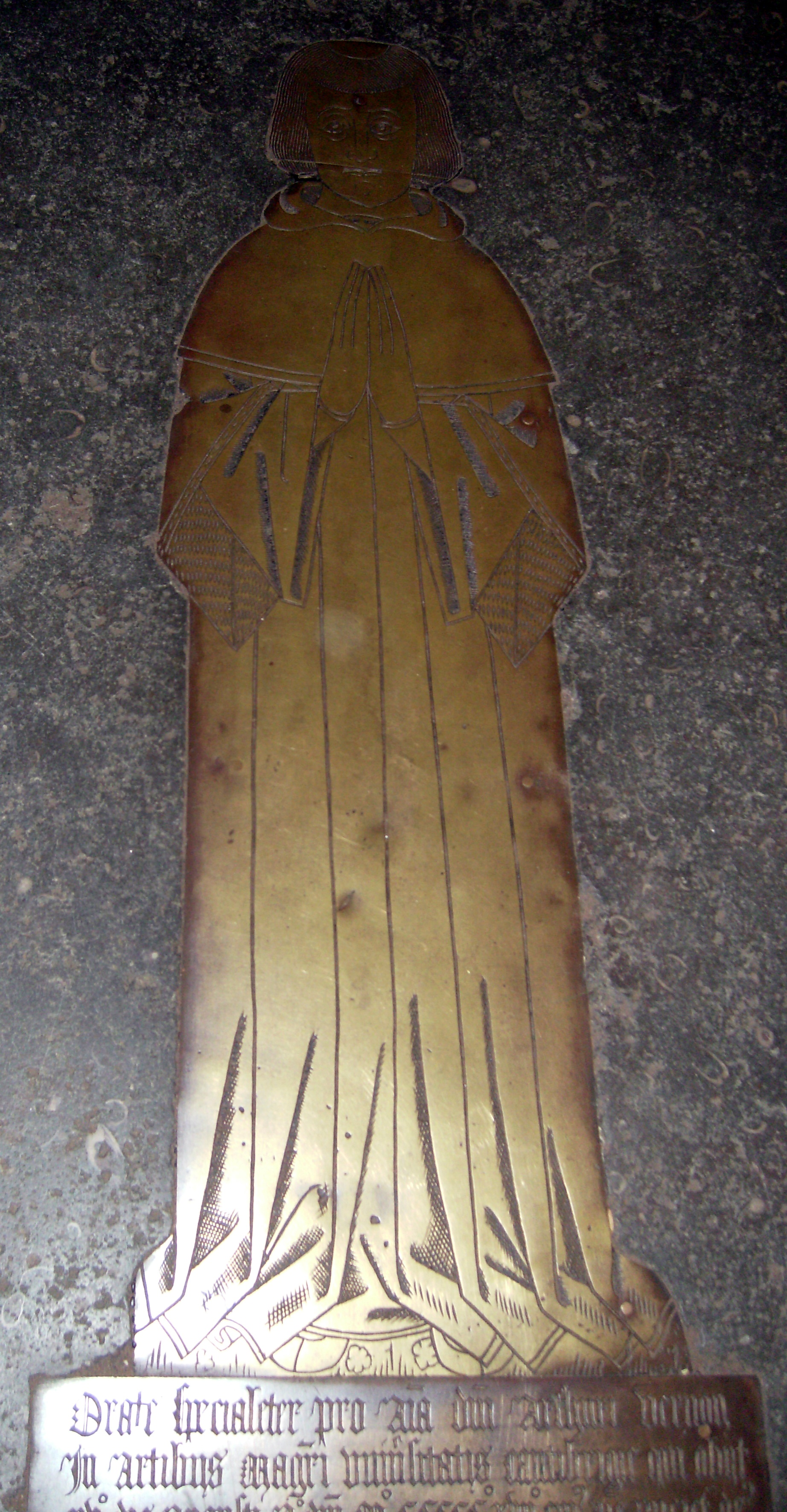
Arthur Vernon as portrayed in a monumental brass in the floor of the Vernon chapel.

Although there were bequests to procure masses, the only permanent chantry established at Tong after the foundation was that of Sir Henry Vernon. He made his will on 18 January 1515 and it was proved by his executors on 5 May that year. They were his sons, Richard and Arthur, a priest, as well as Thomas Rawson, a chaplain of the college.

Sir Henry Vernon instructed that he be buried in a previously designated place at Tong and that the remains of his wife, Anne Talbot, daughter of John Talbot, 2nd Earl of Shrewsbury, be disinterred and buried next to him. The tomb and associated chapel were to be completed within two years of his death and were to be commensurate with his wife's noble origins. He requested the usual trentals of masses but also left 300 marks or £200 to invest for the support of a chantry priest to serve in the chapel. He also left a small estate at Rushall to fund his masses within the church. The men and women of the almshouse were to receive 12d. each to pray for his soul at his funeral and 1d. on his anniversaries. To equip the chantry chapel he left to it his best mass book and a chalice of traditional design.

Sir Henry Vernon directed that his chantry priest should be responsible for all the services in the chapel he had founded but also that he should help at high mass in the choir of the church. Like the priest, the chantry was never fully absorbed into Tong College and its finances were separate. It was named "the Chapel of the Salutation of Our Lady" and at the dissolution received a separate certificate. Its assets were also listed separately from those of the college when sold by the Crown in 1547. They included lands in West Bromwich, Dudley, Tipton and Sedgley in Staffordshire, as well as some close to Tong, and were worth £6 9s. 2d. annually – close to the income of 10 marks envisaged by Vernon.

== Dissolution ==
=== Seizure of the property ===
The commission to dissolve Tong College, issued on 17 September 1546, referred to legislation of the previous year that permitted the king's commissioners to seize on his behalf the property of "chantries, hospitals, colleges, free chapels, fraternities or guilds." It was stamped by William Clerk, a clerk to the Privy Seal under Henry VIII, in the presence of Sir Anthony Denny and Sir John Gates. The commission was addressed to four of the Midlands upper landed gentry, all men with either powerful connections or great wealth, or both: Sir George Blount of Kinlet, brother of the king's former mistress, Elizabeth Blount, a religious conservative but a distinguished soldier who was close to the powerful and Protestant John Dudley, Viscount Lisle; George Vernon, lord of Haddon, apparently not much in favour at Court, whose father Richard had died in 1517, only two years after acting as executor for Sir Henry Vernon; Thomas Giffard, son of Sir John Giffard of Chillington, a former courtier who had played a major part in preparing Henry VIII's reception of Anne of Cleves, and a Catholic who had, nevertheless, acquired Black Ladies Priory after its dissolution through the favour of Thomas Cromwell; and Francis Cave of Baggrave, a property he had acquired on the dissolution of Leicester Abbey, a noted City lawyer and a Protestant. Tong College was one of only a few colleges selected for dissolution under the 1545 act. For the purposes of the seizure, it was grouped together with Vernon's Chantry, housed in the chapel on the south side of the church but institutionally separate, and the "Chantry of the Blessed Mary," a similar Vernon foundation in All Saints' Church, Bakewell.

Three of the commissioners, Vernon, Giffard and Cave, entered and seized Tong College on 27 September and went on to take over a close or small pasture belonging to Vernon's Chantry, as a symbolic seizure of the entire property. Two days later they took over Katherine Wynterbotham's home in Bakewell to represent the seizure of all the chantry property there. Once these token seizures had taken place, proper inventories were drawn up, supervised by Blount, Giffard and Cave. It seems that the sale of the properties to Sir Richard Manners, George Vernon's stepfather, was a foregone conclusion. To make sure he was aware of important outgoings, the inventory began with a detailed list of foods required by the almshouses at Tong, including coarse grain for bread, malt for brewing, fat cattle and pigs, and Lenten items, like pulses and herring. Eggs were specified for the period between Easter and Whitsuntide. Manners was also reminded of the need to provide firewood and to employ a servant girl for the almshouses. The arrears of pay owed to servants from Lady Day to Michaelmas were also listed, along with small loans and wages for casual labourers. The goods of the college and almshouses were appraised by and recorded by a team of surveyors: William Skeffington, a Wolverhampton businessman; Nicholas Agard of Foston, Derbyshire; and Robert Forster, a Tong College tenant. The list included quantities of vestments and textiles, beds and bedding. The cooking equipment was listed, with both the college and the almshouses owning substantial brewing vessels, including brass pans and wort leads. By far the most important assets were the livestock, valued at more than £10 in total, including two oxen, two cattle, and 36 sheep. By contrast, Vernon's Chantry had nothing but vestments, valued at just 11 shillings, although a chalice worth more than £3 made the Bakewell chantry much more valuable. The shared equipment of the almshouses consisted only of old pots and pans.

=== Disposal of estates ===
William Clerk stamped the letters patent granting the Tong and Bakewell estates to Richard Manners in January 1547. The annual value of Tong College was given as £53 13s. 5¼d., Vernon's Chantry at £6 9s. 2d. and Bakewell at £7 5s. 1d. Manners had agreed to pay £486 4s. 2d. for the three properties. However, Henry VIII was dying and the sale went no further until 25 July 1547, when Edward VI was king and his regency council, acting as his father's executors, were in control. It was accepted that Manners had paid the agreed sum at the Court of Augmentations on 12 May to the satisfaction of Henry VIII, who had actually died more than 3 months earlier. The grant specified the lands that were to be transferred to Manners and that he would hold them as one fortieth of a knight's fee, which was translated into a cash rent of £5 4s. 0½d. for the college, 12s. 11d. for Vernon's Chantry and 14s. 6½d. for the Bakewell chantry, to be paid at Augmentations each Michaelmas.

Manners was quick to profit by selling off some of the property. Less than a month later, 15 August 1547, he obtained for 60s. a licence to sell the Tong College building and site, the rectory or tithes of the church and the advowson, Vernon's Chantry and its meadow, together with other small properties to James and Alice Wolryche or Woolrich. On 30 May 1548 he paid £7 18s. 9d. for a licence to sell a Lapley manor and large number of properties previously belonging to the priory to Robert Broke, an eminent lawyer in the service of the City of London but from Claverley in Shropshire. It is clear that Robert Forster, who had helped in the surveying of the college, acquired the lands which he had been leasing from Manners in Wellington and Horsebrook (in Brewood), as well as several estates belonging to Vernon's Chantry, as in 1557 he bought a licence to grant them to his son.

== College after dissolution ==
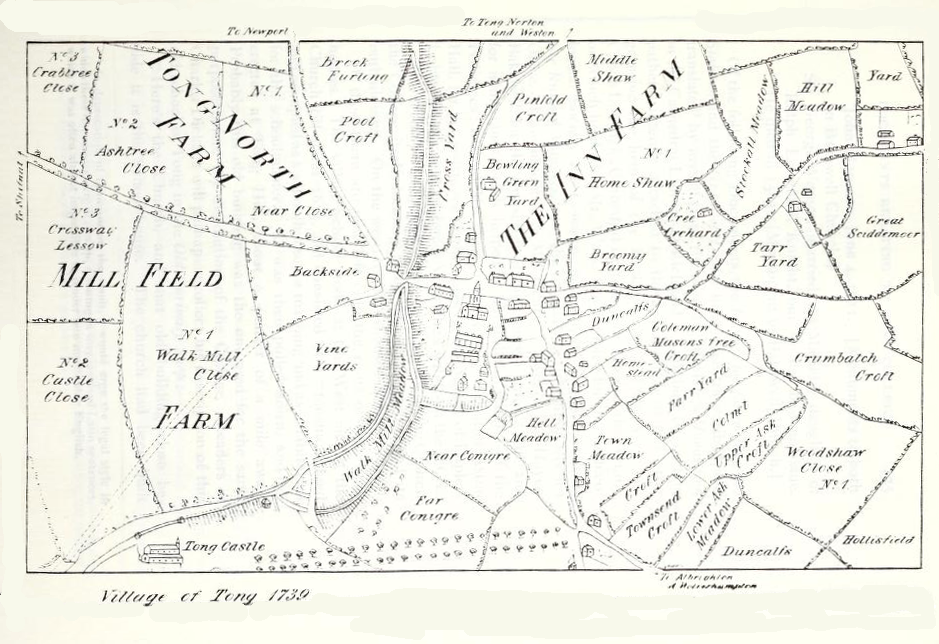
Map of Tong, Shropshire, in 1739, from J.E. Auden (1908), Documents relating to Tong College.

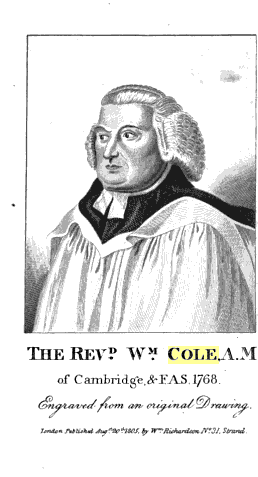
William Cole

The college buildings, constructed in the 15th century, remained with the Woolrich family until after the death of James Woolrich in 1648, when they were sold by his heirs to William Pierrepont, who had acquired the lordship of Tong through marriage. As the advowson, patronage and tithes of the church had all belonged to the college, when William Pierrepont died in 1678 he was able to leave to his youngest son, Gervase "the College, Rectory, Glebe lands and Tithes in the parish of Tong, in the County of Salop." In 1697 Gervase assigned an annuity of £12 to provide for the six widows occupying the almshouses near the west end of the church.

A map of 1739 shows that the college buildings still covered a large area just south of the churchyard. It seems that a rapid deterioration occurred around mid-century. As late as 1757, William Cole, a noted antiquary, observed that the college buildings, now thatched, were still in good repair, forming a complete square, and the almshouses too were in good order: features that led him to comment that "the inhabitants of Tong have more to boast of than most country places." However, in 1763 a description in The Gentleman's Magazine contains the information that "The ancient college where the clergy lived is mostly demolished, and what remains is partly inhabited by some poor people, and partly converted into a stable." The almshouses still stood and those to the west of the church held "six poor widows, who have 40s. a shift and gown, per annum." Early in the 19th century, the owner of the Tong estate, George Durant, had the remaining college structures demolished, leaving just a short section of wall to mark the position of the original almshouses.

== Church and castle ==
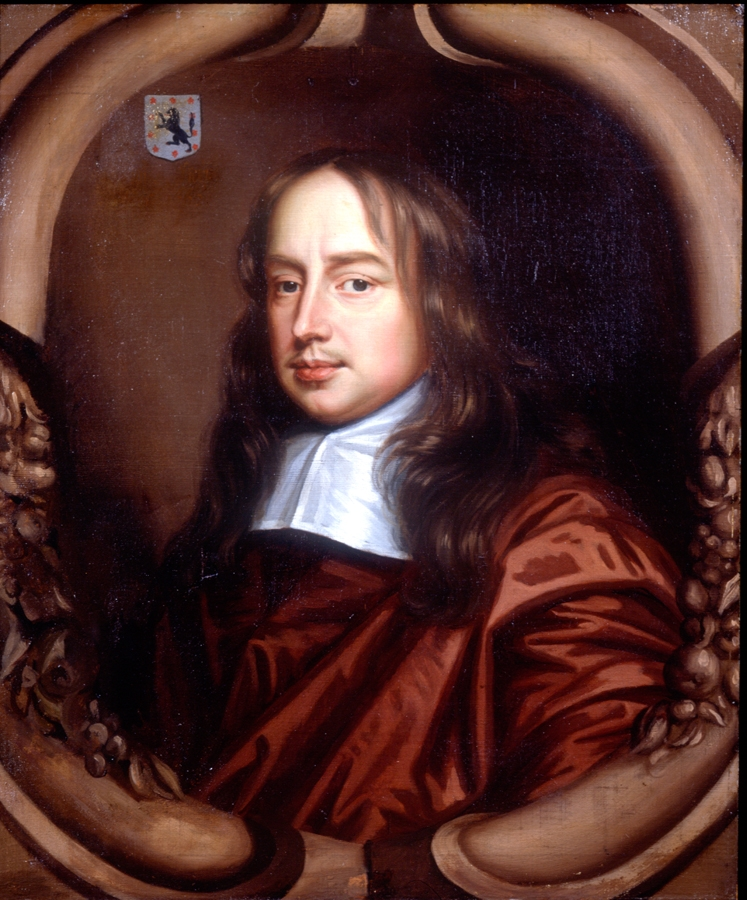
William Pierrepont, Puritan lord of the manor from 1628 and patron of the church from 1648.

After the dissolution of the college, the church continued as the focal point of the small village of Tong, as it always had. For about a century, the advowson of the church belonged to the Wolryche family and it seems that they took the opportunity to install at least one family member: a John Wolryche is recorded as curate in 1561. For more than four decades of the Wolryche period the curacy was held by George Meeson, who appears in diocesan records as early as 1597. Meeson was buried at Tong on 25 March 1642, although his successor, William Southall, had been completing the parish register under the title of rector for a year by then.

Sir Thomas Harries, whose family were lords of Cruckton, had bought the manor from Sir Edward Stanley. He died at Tong on 18 February 1628. William Pierrepont's marriage to Elizabeth Harries, the heiress of Thomas, now gave him the manor. Several Pierrepont children were baptised at Tong: Francis (a daughter) in 1630, Ellinor in 1631, Margaret in 1632, Robert in 1634, Henry in 1637 A son, William, was buried there in 1640. So Pierrepont was committed to Tong, although he was a wealthy and powerful landowner in Nottinghamshire as well as a Lincoln's Inn lawyer and had several other homes. As MP for the Shropshire constituency of Much Wenlock at the outbreak of the English Civil War, Pierrepont was one of the emissaries sent by Parliament to attempt to rally the county against Charles I. However, the attempt failed in the face of a coup carried out by Francis Ottley and the Parliamentarian gentry and clergy were forced to flee the county when the king led his main field army from Nottingham to Shrewsbury. The Shropshire Parliamentary committee did not secure a foothold in the county until autumn of 1643, when it became established at Wem, with support from the Cheshire Parliamentarians, and was not able to retake Shrewsbury itself until February 1645. However, Tong Castle changed hand several times, as it lay close to major routes. It was taken by Parliamentarians from Eccleshall in Staffordshire on 28 December 1643 but was fought over through the following years. William Southall, the incumbent, seems to have remained in post at Tong church until some time in the summer of 1643 but then disappears from view. Richard Symonds, a royalist soldier and diarist recorded in a list of Shropshire garrisons:

Tong Castle. First the King had it; then the rebells gott it; then Prince Rupert tooke it and putt in a garrison, who afterward burnt it when he drew them out to the battaile of York.

Symonds actually witnessed the damage at Tong on 17 May 1645, on the campaign that culminated in the decisive defeat of the royalists at the Battle of Naseby, noting that the church had suffered a large amount of broken glass.

While his home was ransacked, besieged and burnt, William Pierrepont was a lay member of the Westminster Assembly and seems to have been Presbyterian in his sympathies, although he was a friend of Oliver Cromwell and on good terms with the Independents. Parliament's dominance in the Midlands evidently allowed him to become active again in Shropshire and to use Tong Castle. In the 1646 proposed Presbyterian reorganisation of Shropshire Tong was assigned to the third classis, centred on Bridgnorth, and Pierrepont headed the list of lay presbyters. However, the new polity was only patchily established and only the fourth classis, based on Wem and Whitchurch, is known to have functioned fully. During this period considerable sums were assigned to the repair of Tong church. Pierrepont's purchase of the college property from the Wolryche family in 1648 reunited the advowson of the church with the manorial lordship. The parish register shows that baptisms, marriages and burials had continued as normal in the absence of an incumbent, although the officiant is not named. In 1650 Robert Hilton was appointed to be minister of the church.

An entry for 4 March 1660, just before the Restoration, shows that Hilton baptised Elizabeth Nichols in the font, although it is not clear whether this represented a change in practice at that point: Auden contrasts it with the practice at Wem, where baptisms took place in a water basin by the pulpit, in accordance with the Directory for Public Worship. After the Restoration, Pierrepont continued to work for the Presbyterian cause in the Convention Parliament (1660) but also spoke against forcing Catholic recusants to take the Oath of Supremacy. He was criticised for his tolerance and flexibility from all sides. The parliament decreed that living ministers who had been ejected from their cures during the Commonwealth of England might return. Hilton retired in December 1660, although he was not compelled to do so, as Southall was dead. His successor, Joseph Bradley, who had no university degree and was presumably ordained by a Presbyterian classis, underwent episcopal ordination successively as a deacon and priest during 1662, avoiding the Great Ejection.

Gervase Pierrepont, William's son and heir, was an assiduous supporter of the established church and took steps to provide well for his own curate. By a deed dated 23 October 1697 he ensured that the curate should receive all the lesser tithes: hay, wool, lamb, hemp, flax, apples, pears, etc. Only the tithes of corn and grain were excepted. He also granted an annuity to ensure that the curate's income should not fall below £30 per annum. He assigned a further annuity of £14 to feed the minister and a third to provide £6 for a horse, although these were not to be paid if the minister or his horse were provisioned at the castle. A room and stabling, as well as free summer grazing, were expressly made available for this purpose. There was no vicarage building until 1725, so the perpetual curate sometimes lived in the castle and served as a private chaplain to the manorial lord and his family when they were in residence, although most had several other houses. Gervase was politically very different from his father. Tory and anti-war, he was unable to secure a parliamentary seat in what he regarded as his home county of Shropshire. He was forced to rely on the influence of his nephew, Thomas Tufton, 6th Earl of Thanet, and on large scale bribery to take a seat at Appleby in the House of Commons of England from 1698 to 1705. In 1703 he became Baron Pierrepont of Ardglass, an Irish title that did not conflict with participation in the English Commons: in 1714, a few months before his death, he finally acquired the English barony of Pierrepont of Hanslape, commencing a brief period in which Tong was held by peers of the realm. His generosity to the clergy was emulated by his successors and the 1763 description noted that "Tong is now a perpetual curacy and the Duke of Kingston allows the minister 80l. (equivalent to £13,722 in 2025) per annum." The church continued to serve as a place of worship for the families who occupied Tong Castle, as they were its patrons and it was in the castle's demesne.

Tong Castle was demolished in 1954 by the Army after it had fallen into disrepair. Before the building of the A41 bypass in 1963, the distance from Tong Castle to the church was 1,640 feet (500 m) alongside the body of water known as Church Pool as the traditional road ran around the church and through the village. (Note: At some point the name of the pool was changed from North Pool (as it was located on the north side of Tong Castle) to Church Pool. It is listed as North Pool on the tithe map of 1855, but the Ordnance Survey map of 1951 lists it as Church Pool. This was 12 years before the pool was bisected by the A41 bypass.)

The land that the church is built on is not level and slopes downhill from east to west. Jeffery suggests that it could be the bedrock underneath, but it was also thought that this was a deliberate and practical act to allow the floor to be washed as water poured in from the east would flow straight out of the west door.

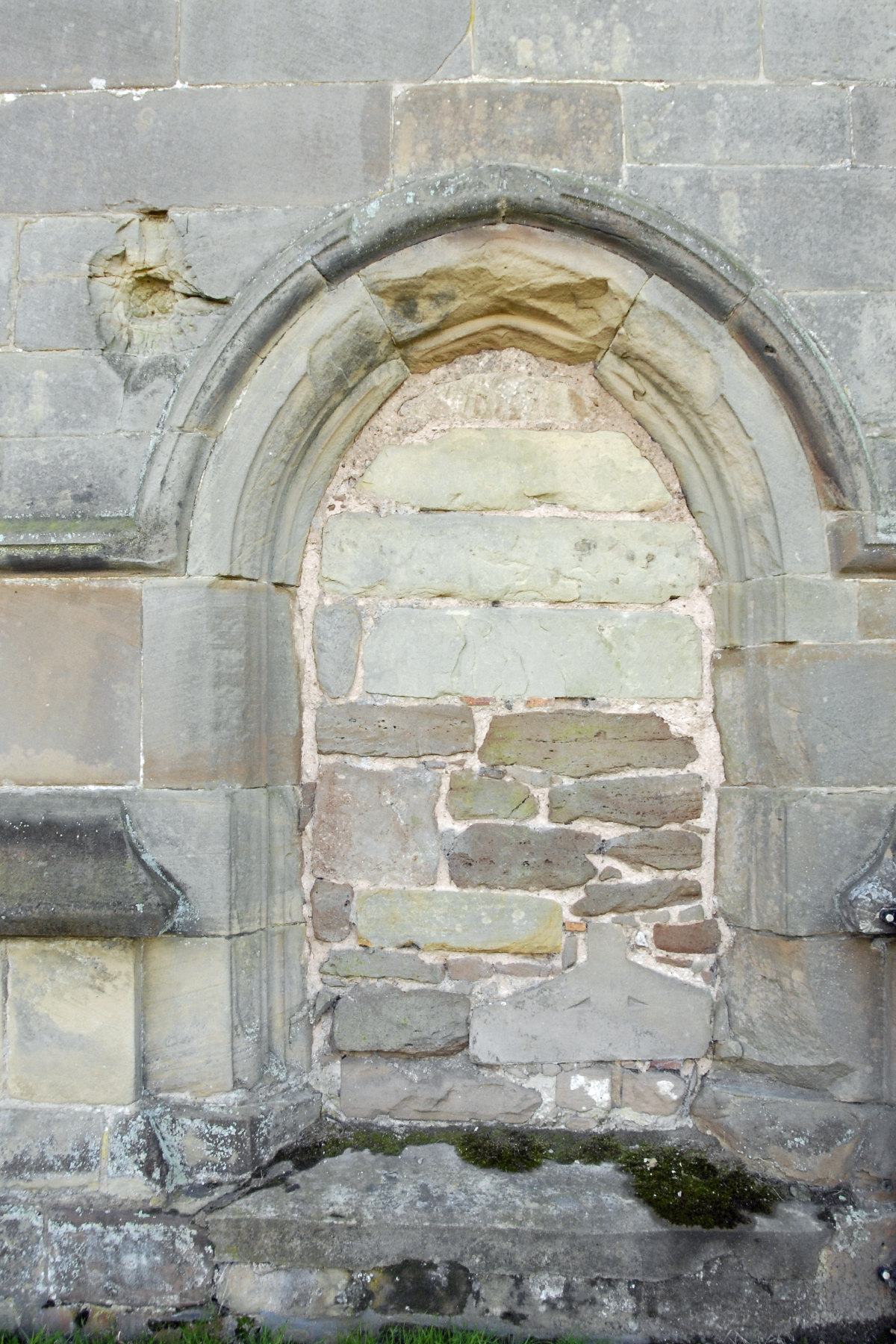
Blocked north doorway

The church's north door served as the "Door of Excommunication", though it is not clear when this was last used or when it was sealed. A stoneworked version of the Royal Arms of George III, is located above the north door which is made of Coade stone. The monument cost £60 in 1814 and was a present from George Jellicoe to celebrate the Peace of Paris and Napoleon's exile to Elba. The whole church was restored late in the 19th century under the direction of Ewan Christian that was completed in 1892.

The church owns a ciborium known as The Tong Cup. Nikolaus Pevsner dates the cup to between 1540 and 1550, which Robert Jeffery says is far too early and recent research suggests it was made almost a century later. The cup is 11 inches (280 mm) tall and is described in the parish records as being "a communion cup of goulde and christall" though it is silver gilt and does have a central barrel made of crystal. After JE Auden tried to sell the cup to raise money, and at least one nobleman borrowing it for 30 years, the cup has been removed to the treasury of Lichfield Cathedral, but it remains the property of the parish.

Like many churches, St Bartholomew's has been targeted by lead thieves who have stripped the roof and the church was targeted six times between 2010 and 2015. In 2017, after a private and public funding was supplied, terne-coated stainless steel has been used to deter the metal thieves.

The church is often cited as one worthy of a visit due to its heritage and history. R. W. Eyton, who spent some of his youth in Tong, wrote in 1855 that "if there be any place in Shropshire calculated to impress the moralist, instruct the antiquary and interest the historian, that place is Tong. It was for centuries the abode or heritage of men, great either for their wisdom or their virtues, eminent either from their station or their misfortunes." Simon Jenkins profiled the church in his book, England's Thousand Best Churches, where Tong church is one of three in Shropshire that he awarded three stars, surpassed only by St Laurence's Church, Ludlow. St Bartholomew's is also frequently labelled as "The Westminster Abbey of the West Midlands", a title it has acquired because of its history and decorations (though Helen Moorwood notes that this title could be applied to a number of churches in the region). The first person recorded to have described St Bartholomew's as a "little Westminster" was Elihu Burritt, an American consul based in Birmingham, who was in awe of its "beautiful and costly monuments".

== Bells ==
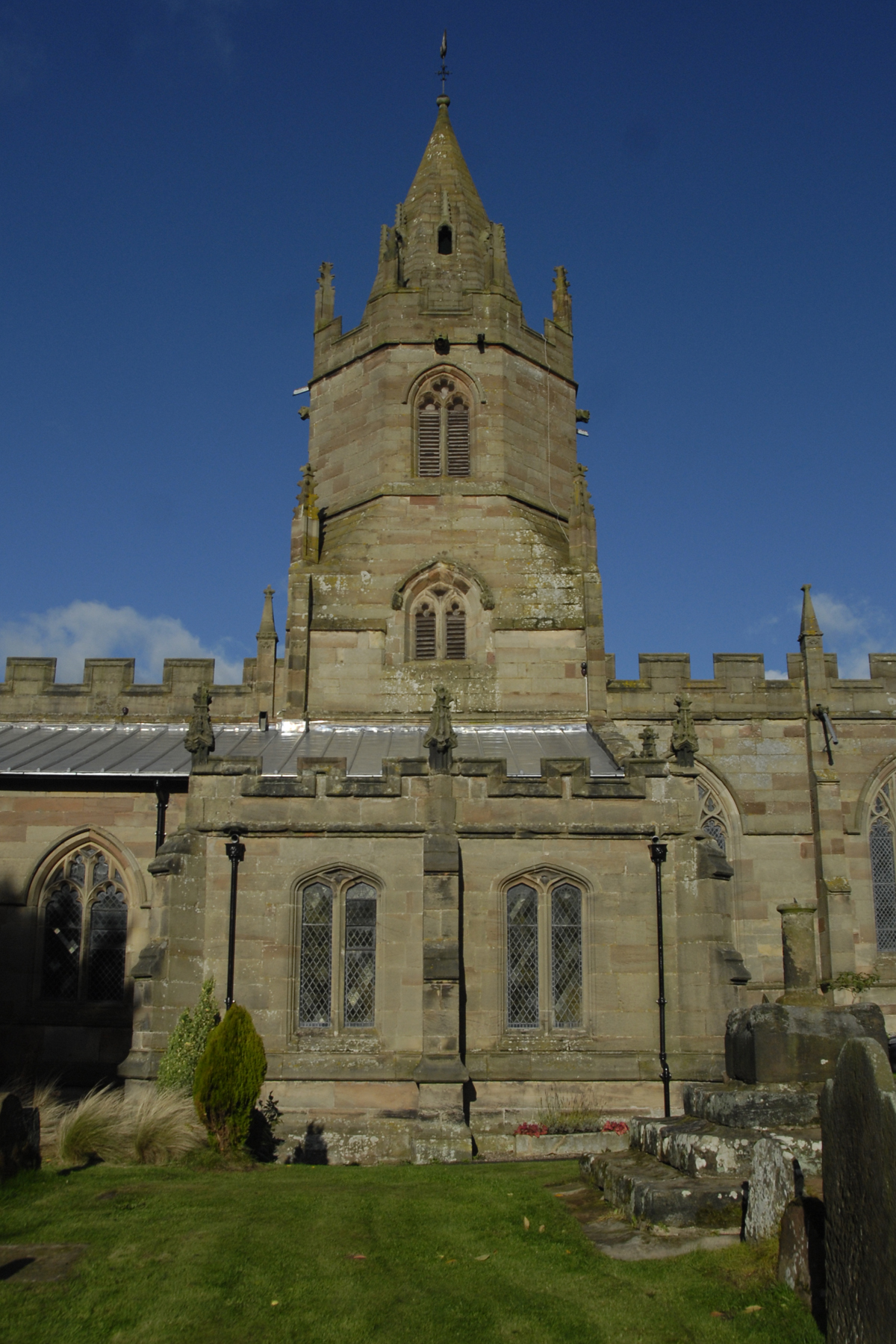
Spire, crossing tower and Vernon Chapel, seen from the south

The crossing tower has a ring of six bells. Robert I Newcombe of Leicester cast the third bell in 1593. Henry II Oldfield of Nottingham cast the fourth bell in 1605. William Clibury of Wellington, Shropshire cast the fifth bell in 1623 and the second bell in 1636. Abraham II Rudhall of Gloucester cast the treble bell in 1719. Thomas II Mears of the Whitechapel Bell Foundry, who had also a foundry at Gloucester, recast the tenor bell in 1810.

The church has also a service or Sanctus bell that was cast by a member of the Newcombe family about 1600.

St Bartholomew's is noted for its bourdon bell, which weighs 2 long tons 6 cwt 1 qr (5,180 lb or 2.35 t) and was re-cast in the same year that Christian's restoration of the church was completed. The bourdon is called the Great Bell of Tong, and 1892 is the second time that it has been re-cast. The money for a bell was bequeathed by Sir Henry Vernon in 1518. It was cracked in the Civil War and not re-cast until 1720. It was cracked again in 1848 during an Ascension Day service and not re-cast until 1892. and is claimed to be the loudest and biggest bell in Shropshire, and as such, on its third recasting, it was feared that the supporting tower structure would not support continued tolling. The bell is now rung only on certain days and on certain occasions (Note: Occasions for the ringing of the Great Bell of Tong are: When a member of the Royal Family or the head of the Vernon family visit Tong, On the birth of an heir to the Earldom of Bradford, Christmas Day, Good Friday, Easter Sunday, Whitsunday, and St Bartholomew's Day, The death of either a monarch, the Bishop of Lichfield, the vicar of Tong or the Earl of Bradford.) which gives the vicar of the church an equal status with the local noble families and the sitting monarch of the United Kingdom.

In "White-ladies," one of the "Boscobel Tracts" that describe the events of the escape of Charles II from England after the Battle of Worcester (3 September 1651), there is a statement that Charles, while sheltering at Boscobel House about two miles away, "had the pleasure of a prospect from Tong to Breewood (sic), which satisfied the eyes, and of the famous bells at Tong, which entertained the ear." The bells he heard were the bells of St. Bartholomew's.

== Exterior and grounds ==
The church is built of New Red Sandstone, which is abundant locally. Pevsner describes it as "local sandstone ashlar of a sombre brown hue which has worn wonderfully well". The church can be seen from the A41 and is described as being so beautiful as it makes the traveller wish to stop and explore further. Its low pitched roof is decorated with battlements, pinnacles and gargoyles.

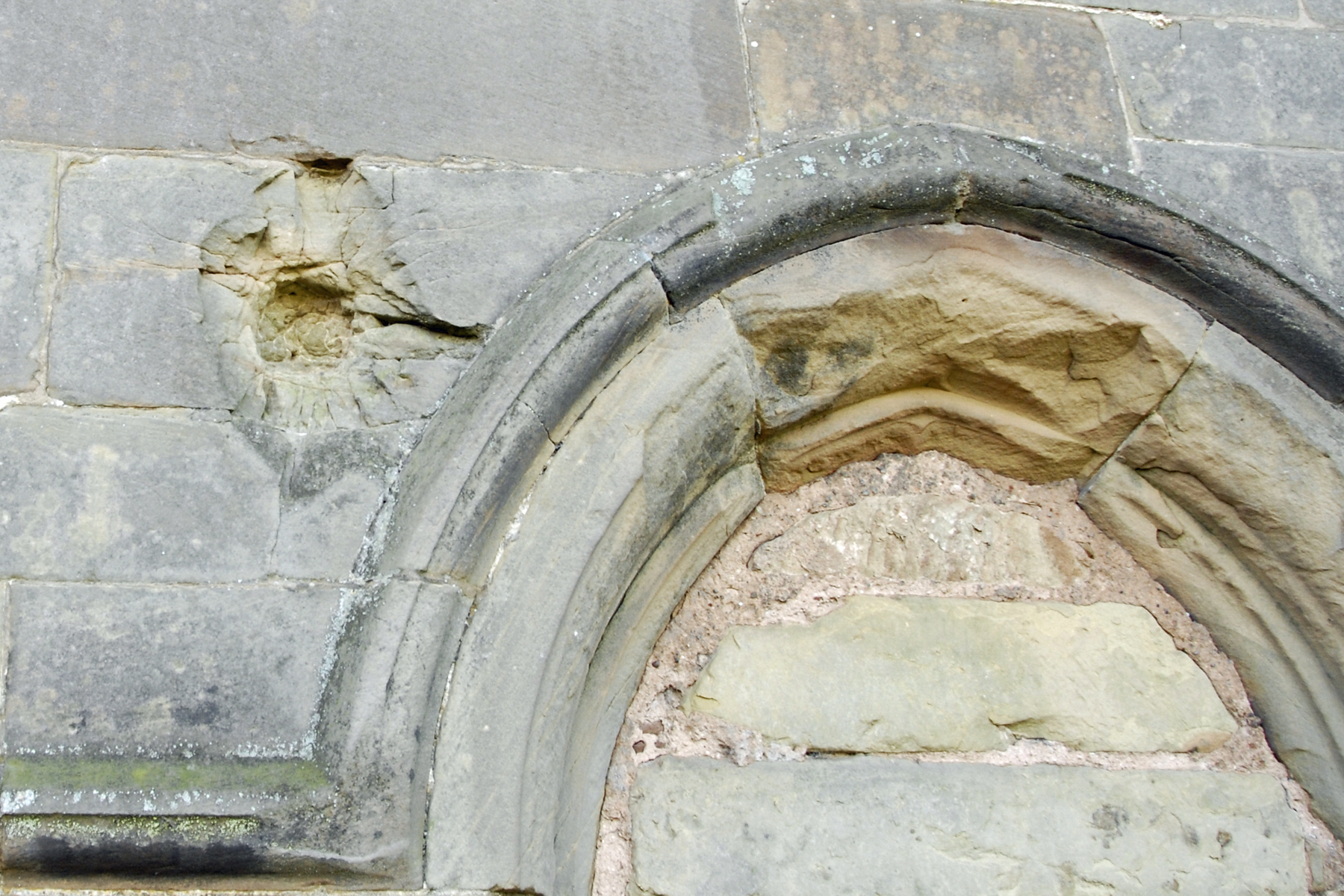
Cannonball damage next to the blocked north doorway

The north side of the church has many musket ball holes and at least one cannon-shot hole in its outer walls. These were made during the English Civil War when minor skirmishes between the two warring factions were trying to wrest control of Tong Castle from each other. Because the church was on the road between Newport and Wolverhampton, it regularly featured in the fighting. After the fighting, one of the soldiers, identified as Richard Symonds, described Tong church as "[a] faire church [but] the windows much broken".

The musket ball holes have also been alluded to possibly be from when enemy soldiers were executed (usually on the north wall of a church). This has been discounted with the church at Tong as it was felt that the extreme dip between the road and the church wall would make it impractical. One of the smaller bells was taken from the church to be melted down for use in artillery and lead from the church roof was also stripped to provide ammunition for firearms.

A carved statue of St Bartholomew is situated on the east wall and sits in a niche. The statue was made by Pat Austin, the wife of the rose breeder, David Austin, whose rose growing business is located in nearby Albrighton. 16 feet (5 m) south of the South Chapel in the church is the base of a 15th-century cross. The base is made of sandstone and used to have a headcross upon it, but this has since been lost and replaced in 1776 with a sundial. The base is grade II* listed.

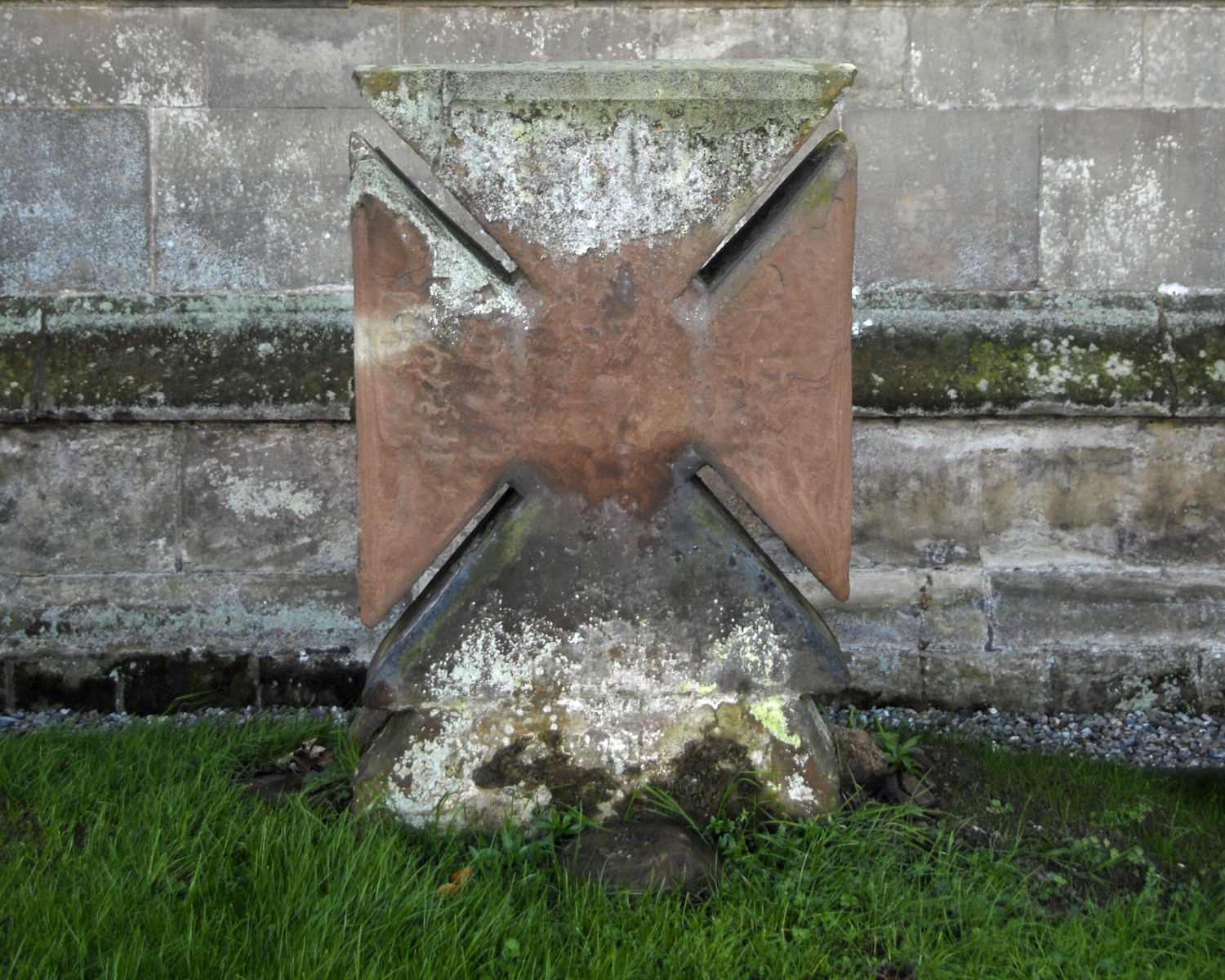
Chrysom Graveyard outside St Bartholomew's Church, Tong, Shropshire

For some time, at least until the 18th century, school buildings were located in the churchyard.The licence for the college was granted by Henry IV in 1410 and the college buildings were located on the south side of the church. The buildings were largely destroyed in 1644 during the English Civil War when Colonel Tiller drove the Parliamentarians from Tong Castle, church and college. Subsequent archaeological investigations determined that the buildings had been burnt around that time period. The college buildings survived until the middle of the 18th century when they were taken apart. George Durant destroyed the rest in the 19th century and their site is directly under the A41 bypass.

Between the north side of the nave and the vestry there is a gap which has a small Maltese Cross sunk into the ground. This area is known as "Chrysom's Graveyard" and was where unbaptised babies were buried. (Note: A Chrysom was a cloth used in baptismal services on infants. The OED describe it as a cloth symbolising innocence which was also often used as a shroud if the child were to die. The white cloth was applied to the infants head during the service, and would be left in place for a week. In an emergency baptism, the cloth would still be in place when the child was buried. Quite often, the infants were known as Chrysom Child[ren]. This graveyard became a place where all unbaptised or stillborn children would be buried.) The cross has lines from Lord Byron, Walter Scott and Sir Thomas More cut into it (though they are mostly worn away now by weathering), and, like many other parts of the church area, is a Grade II listed structure.

=== Little Nell's grave ===
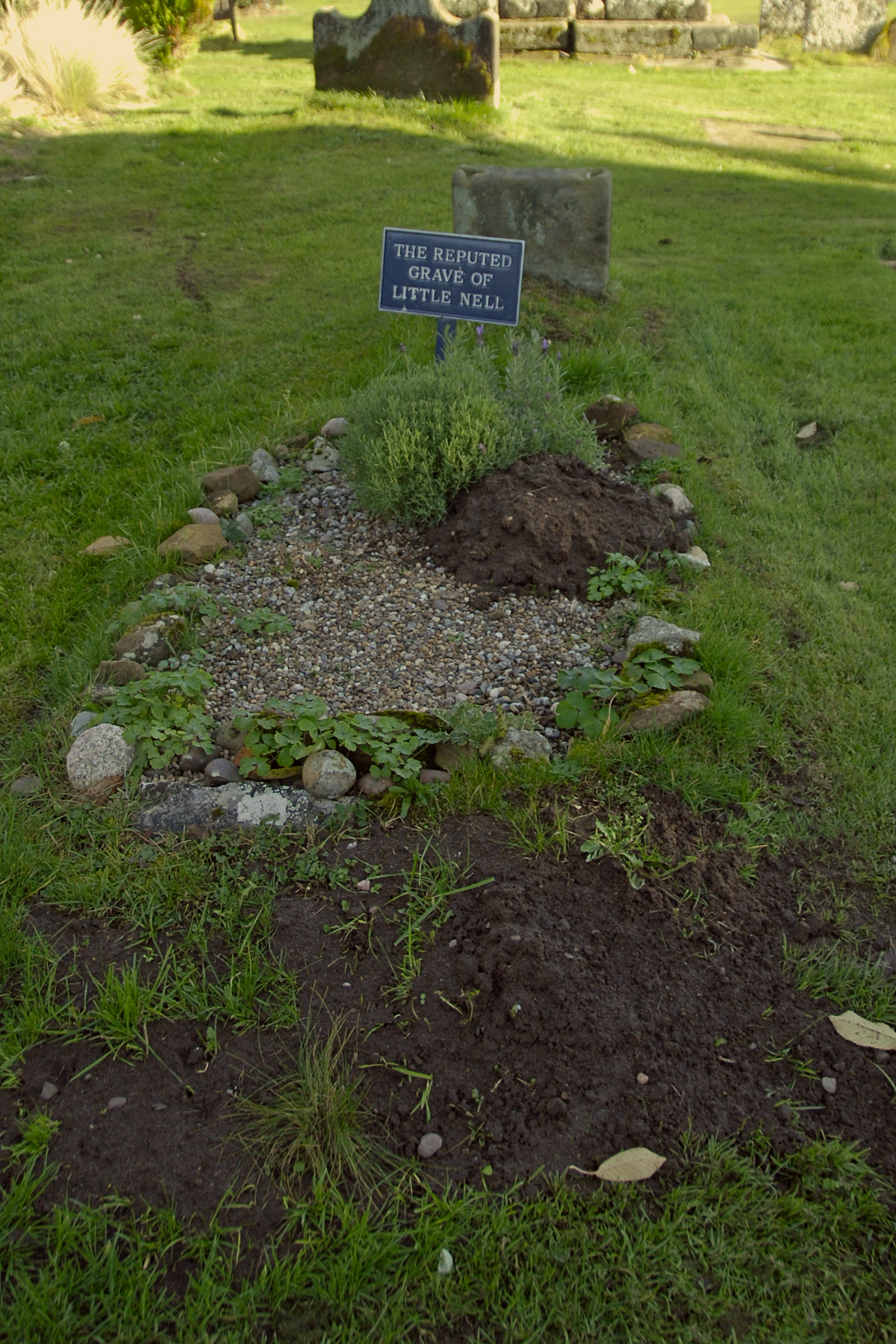
Reputed grave of Little Nell in St Bartholomew's churchyard

The churchyard has a grave in it that has a little metal plate attached to it which reads "The reputed grave of Little Nell". This stems from the character of Little Nell in Charles Dickens' novel, The Old Curiosity Shop. In the novel, both Little Nell and her grandfather are made destitute, and move to an unidentified West Midlands village to become beggars. At the end of the book, Nell dies and her grandfather sits by her grave waiting for her return (he is afflicted with a mental illness and so refuses to admit that she is, in fact, dead).

Around 1910, the verger at the time, George Bowden, a village postmaster, created a false entry in the parish register to state that a Nell Gwyn was buried in the churchyard. The giveaway was that he used Post Office ink rather than the normal ink used in the register. He also created a grave which has moved around in the last 100 years as real people were interred in the church grounds. Despite being a fake and also that Nell is a fictitious character, the grave has attracted many visitors including some from as far afield as America.

Tong has been identified as the setting for Nell's death because Dickens' grandmother was the housekeeper at Tong Castle and whilst he was staying at nearby Albrighton to visit her, he is said to have penned the closing lines in the novel. Dickens himself confirmed this to the clergy in the church of Tong after publication of The Old Curiosity Shop, with Dickens also describing the church as "..a very aged, ghostly place".

== Interior ==
The interior of the church has been described as being a "splendid Perpendicular Gothic interior [that] attracts thousands of heritage visitors each year". The history, monuments and relics inside of and including the church itself, are a Grade I listed building. The four supporting pillars that are aligned along the south side of the nave are from the original church and have been dated to the late 13th century. The main body of the church is early 15th century and the only major addition after that, is the Vernon Chantry (or Golden Chapel) which was added in the early 16th century. Unlike contemporary churches, St Bartholomew's does not have a clerestory.

St Bartholomew's Tong schematic This is a representational diagram and as such is not to scale

The tower is noted for its rectangular base that supports an octagonal structure, which in turn, is topped off with a short spire. The base of the tower has the belfry and access to it and the rood loft is found through a door in the north east pillar from which the pulpit used to hang. The pulpit itself is a Jacobean style 17th century gift, and now stands just west of the pillar. The pulpit is hexagonal, dated to 1622 and inscribed with Ex dono Dne Harries Ano Dni 1622 (the gift of Lady Harries).

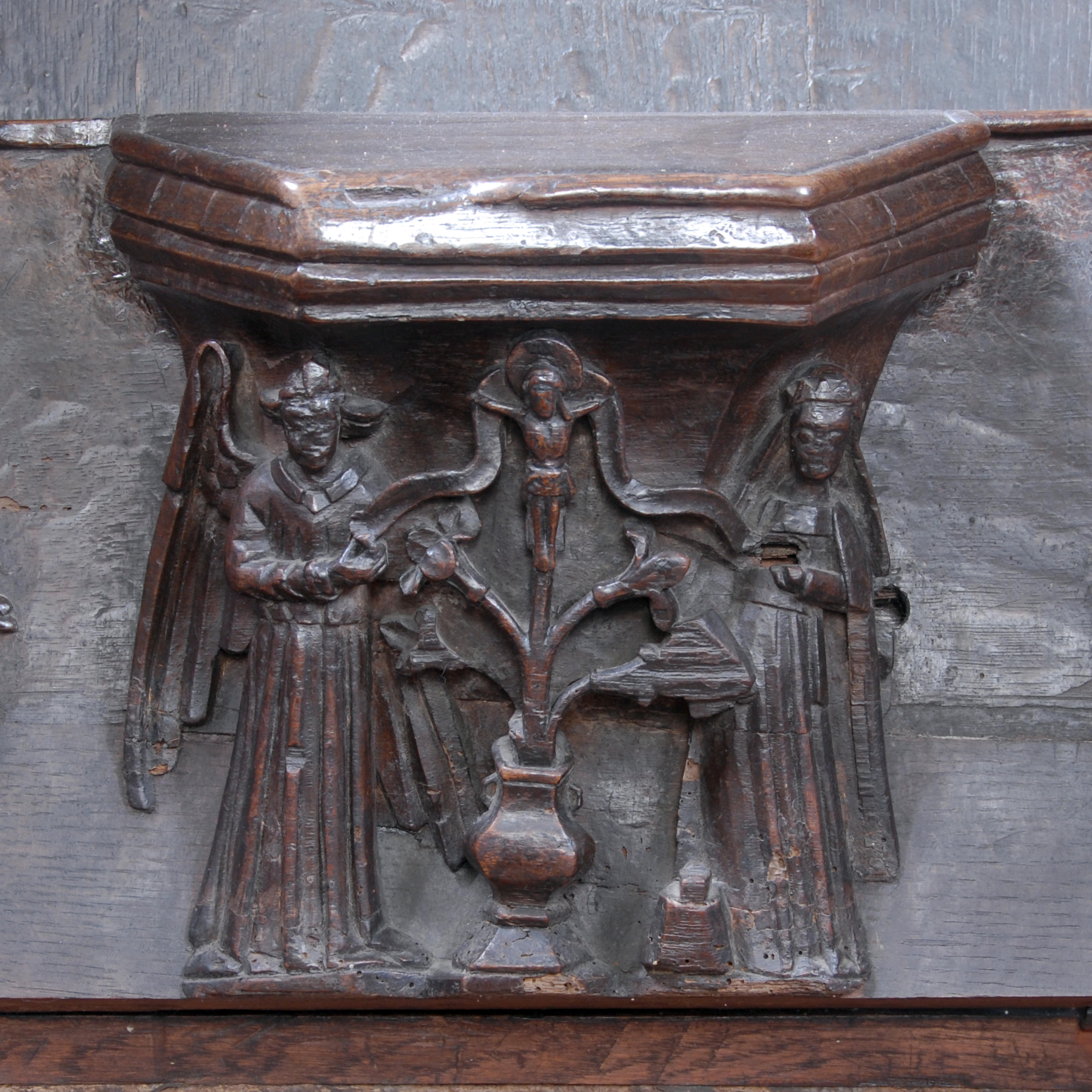
Lily crucifix misericord in Tong church, Shropshire

The choir is lined with stalls that are adorned with misericords dated to about 1480. One particular example, where the warden of the church would have sat, includes an example of a Lily crucifix carved into it, of which there are only a dozen examples left in England, with St Bartholomew's misericord being the only one in England displayed in wood. (Note: Lily Crucifixes depict Christ being crucified on a lily (or a lily in the background). This stems from an old belief that the day of the Annunciation and the day of the crucifixion are one and the same – 25 March. Most examples were removed after the Reformation, so they are now quite rare.) Given that the rest of the misericords do not denote any other biblical subjects, it has been suggested that the carver was unaware of the symbolism and that its carving was just down to chance. The panelling is 19th century and from Oberammergau.

The east window was designed and installed by Charles Kempe at the same time as the church's restoration. The east window is noted for its detail and is five windows (or lights) divided by a transom. Kempe rescued what 15th century glass that he could and installed it in the west window, above the west door, which was unblocked during this time also.

=== Tombs ===
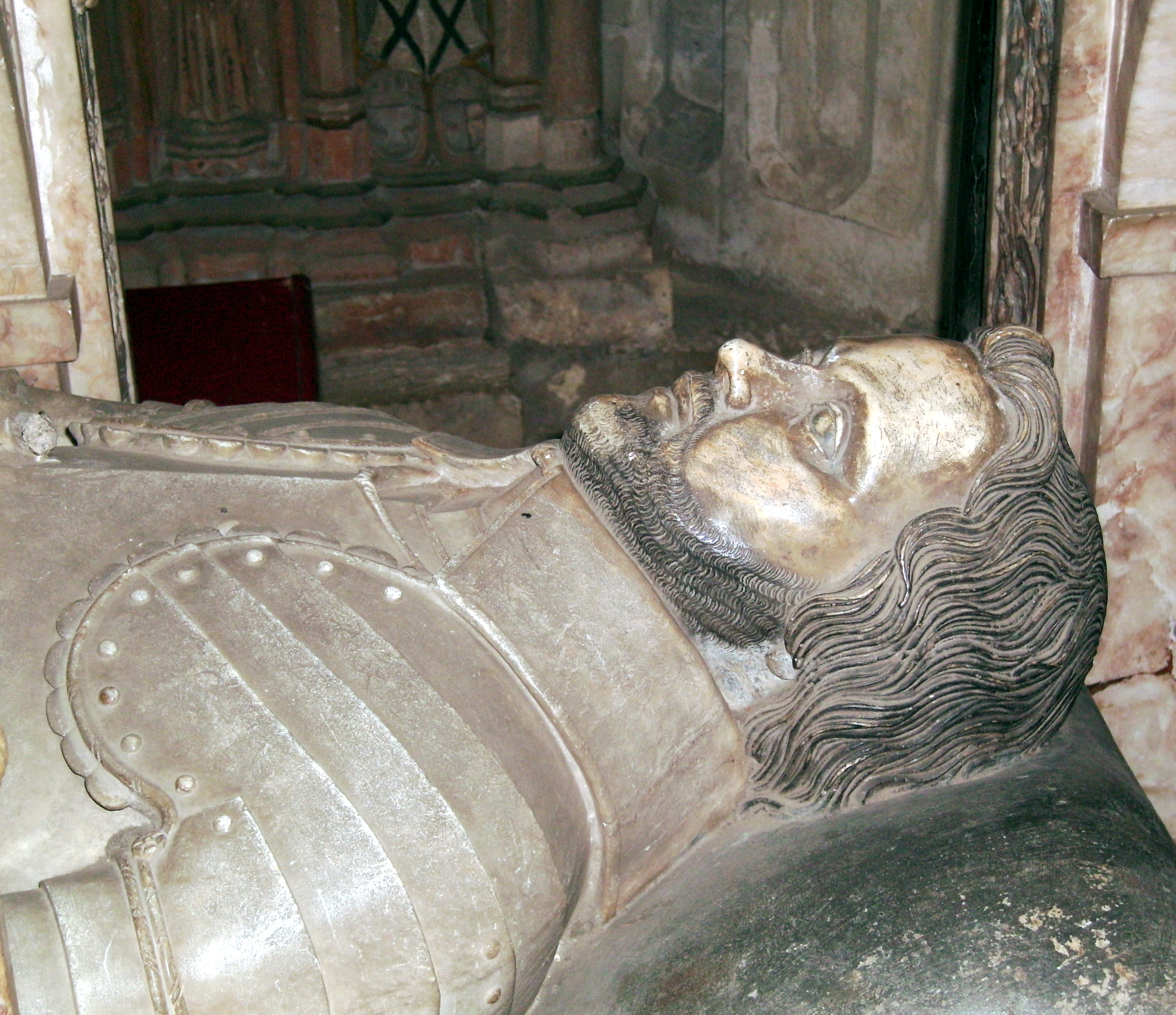
Edward Stanley (died 1632). Lower tier of a double family tomb.

In the nave and aisles are many monuments, tombs and effigies celebrating the lives of many of its worshippers, gentry and former owners. The most famous is the Stanley monument which used to be on the north side of the altar in the church, but was moved to the south transept in the 18th century by George Durant II to make way for a monument to his father, George Durant I. There are two epitaphs inscribed on the Stanley monument, written by Shakespeare at the behest of Sir Edward Stanley for his parents, when the two met (surmised to be in London by Moorwood). This gives Tong Church the distinction of being the only setting where two of Shakespeare's epitaphs are carved into stone in one place. The only other epitaph written by Shakespeare that is carved in stone is that on Shakespeare's own grave in Stratford-upon-Avon. Shakespeare's connection to the Stanley family lies in the fact that they were (alongside other families) his patrons when he was in Lancashire. The two epitaphs are said to be very close in literature to sonnets 55 and 81 by Shakespeare. The tomb itself is on two levels with the upper level displaying the effigies of Sir Thomas Stanley and his wife, Margaret Vernon. The lower level has an effigy of their son, Edward, who is not memorialised with his wife as her tomb is in St Mary's Church in Walthamstow. The decorative figures that used to adorn the tomb (and are now much damaged) have been placed on the upper part of the Burgundian arch. Sir Thomas and his wife have their hands clasped in prayer, whereas Edward has his right hand on his chest. According to Watney, writing in the Church Monuments Society journal, this placement of Edward's hand signifies that the tomb was completed in his lifetime.

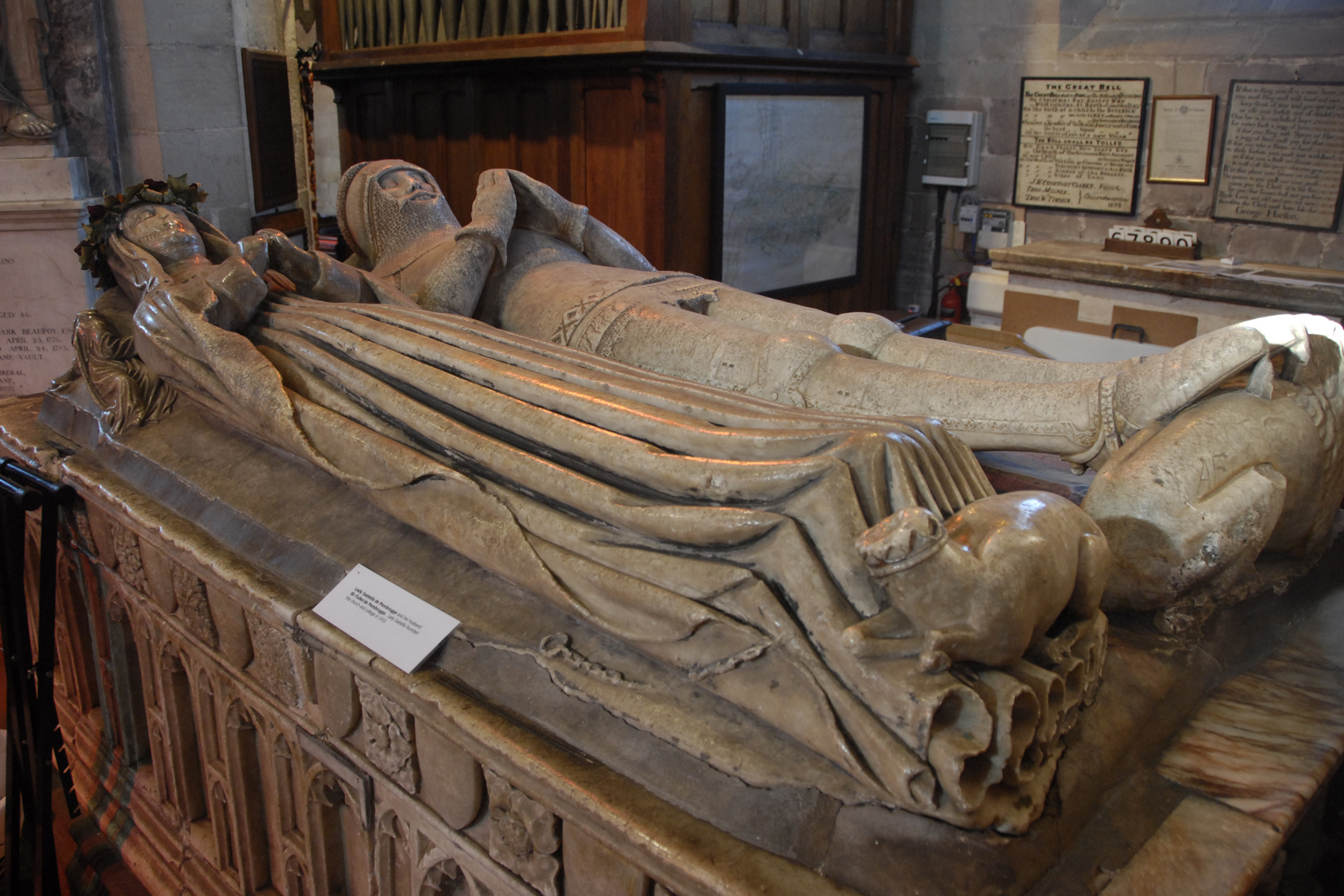
Early 15th-century effigies of Sir Fulk and Lady Isabel de Pembrugge

Effigies of Sir Fulke and Dame Isabel de Pembrugge lie together on a tomb located at the north side of the tower. The tomb is made from Nottingham Alabaster (Note: This is a term for the people who carved the alabaster, it was mined or quarried in South Derbyshire.) and has sustained some damage, although some of the original black paint in Isabel de Pembrugge's widow dress is still visible today. Dame Isabel died in 1446 and every Midsummer's Day, a chaplet of roses is placed around her head. RW Eyton, the great Shropshire antiquarian, reported in 1855 that this tradition had at that time died out, although he quoted an anonymous correspondent of The Gentleman's Magazine for 1800 to show that it had been alive, if not understood, in the late 18th century.

The effigies lie on an altar-tomb, and had the remains of a garland of flowers (then nearly reduced to dust) round the neck and breast. The sexton told me, that on every Midsummer day a new garland was put on, and remained so until the following, when it was annually renewed. As this is a singular custom, I could not forbear noticing it, and wish to be informed what was the origin of it.

Eyton explained that the custom was rooted in a deed sufficiently unusual to be recorded by the herald William Dugdale, by which a lord of Tong, Roger la Zouche, some time between 1237 and 1247, had granted land and rights to a neighbouring landowner.

This Roger, being Lord of the Mannor of Tonge, in Com. Salop. … did, by a fair Deed grant to Henry de Hugefort, and his Heirs, three Yard-Land, three Messuages, and certain Woods lying in Norton, and Shawe, (in the Parish of Tonge) with Paunage for a great number of Hogs, in the Woods belonging to that Mannor: As also liberty of Fishing in all his Waters there, excepting the great Pool of Tonge; with divers other Privileges, viz. of getting Nuts in those Woods for several days, &c. Rendring yearly to him the said Roger, and his Heirs, a Chaplet of Roses, upon the Feastday of the Nativity of St. Iohn Baptist, in case he or they should be then at Tonge; if not, then to be put upon the Image of the Blessed Virgin, in the Church of Tonge.

Subsequent authors have asserted out that since the Reformation when the statue was removed, the churchgoers have placed the flowers into the hands of the churches' "other lady". However, the original terms indicated that the chaplet was owed by the Hugford family to Roger la Zouche and his heirs, so the logic seems to be that it is now paid or commemorated on "the earliest Monument of the Manorial Lords which the Church happened to contain."

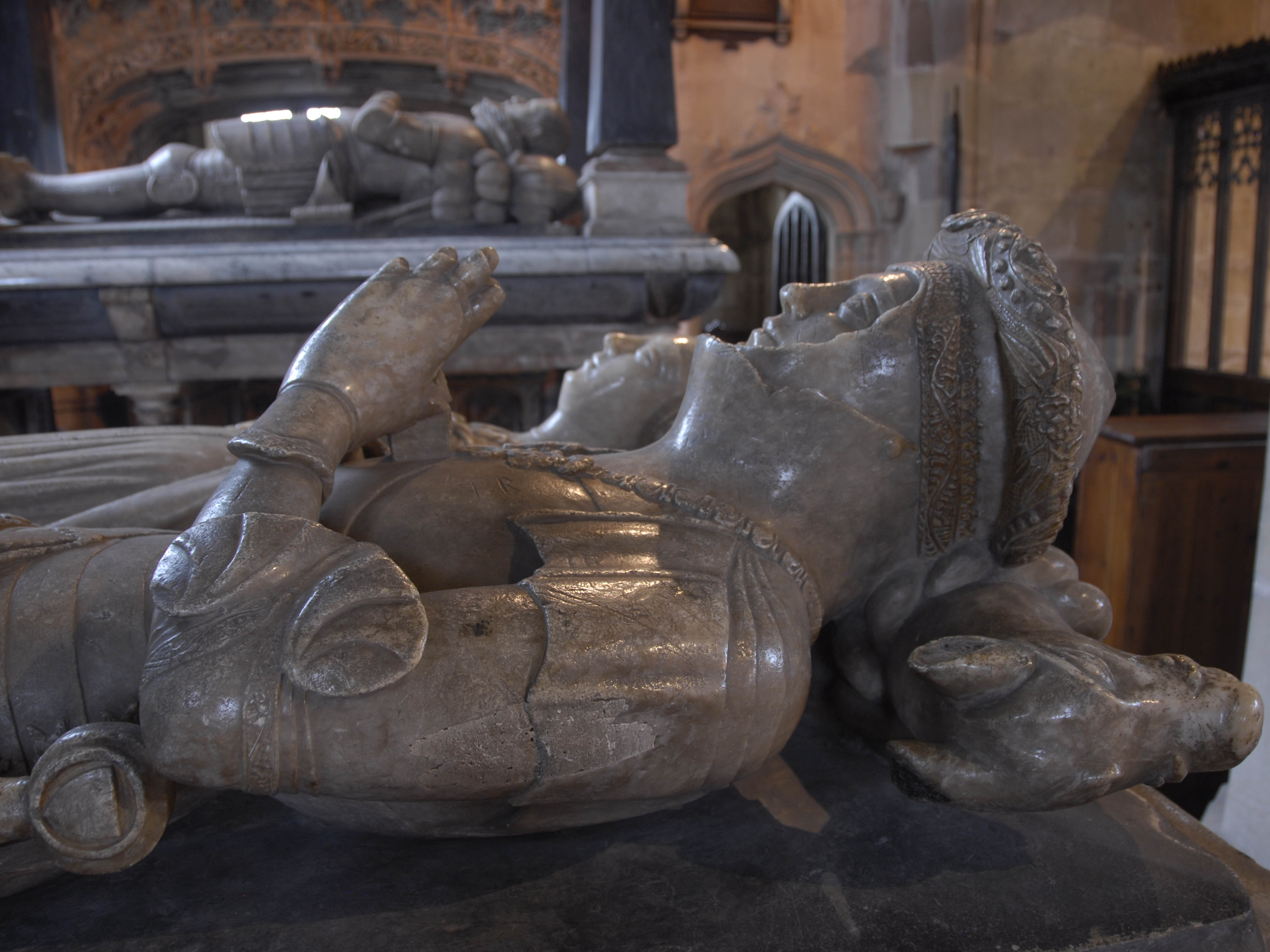
Part of the tomb of Sir Richard Vernon (died 1451)

On the opposite side of the de Pembrugge's tomb is the tomb of Sir Richard Vernon and Benedicta de Ludlow. Again, it is carved from alabaster and Pevsner suggests this came from Chellaston in Derbyshire because the angels carved into it are of the type supplied by Thomas Prentys and Robert Sutton who worked in alabaster. The Vernons lived at Haddon Hall in Derbyshire, but when they married into the Tong lordship, (Note: Sir Richard Vernon married Benedicta de Ludlow who was the daughter of Isabel de Pembrugge and Sir John Ludlow.) they chose to be buried at St Bartholomew's.

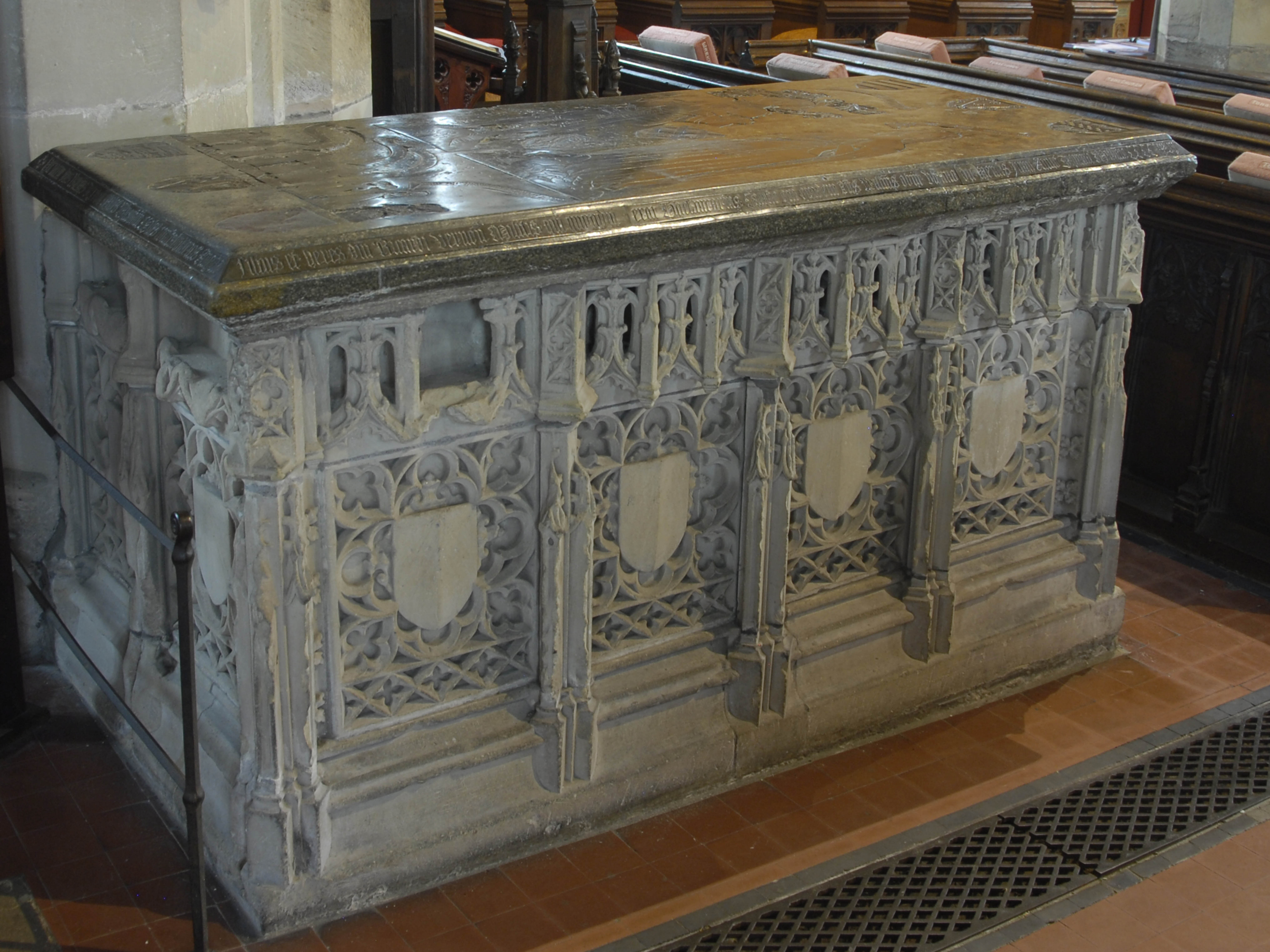
15th-century tomb of Sir William Vernon and his wife, Margaret Swynfen

West of the first Vernon monument and adjacent to one of the original 13th century pillars, is the tomb of Sir William Vernon and his wife, Margaret Swynfen. This is constructed of Purbeck marble which is inlaid with a brass representation of Sir William and his wife. Other members of the Vernon family have tombs next to the pulpit (Richard Vernon and Margaret Dymoke) and also Henry Vernon and his wife Anne (Talbot) Vernon, who are memorialised underneath a Burgundian archway that separates the Vernon Chapel from the south side of the nave.

The Vernon Chapel, divided from the south aisle by an ogee-headed door, was completed circa 1519–1520 and holds many monuments including one to Sir Henry Vernon (carved from Nottingham Alabaster) who built it.

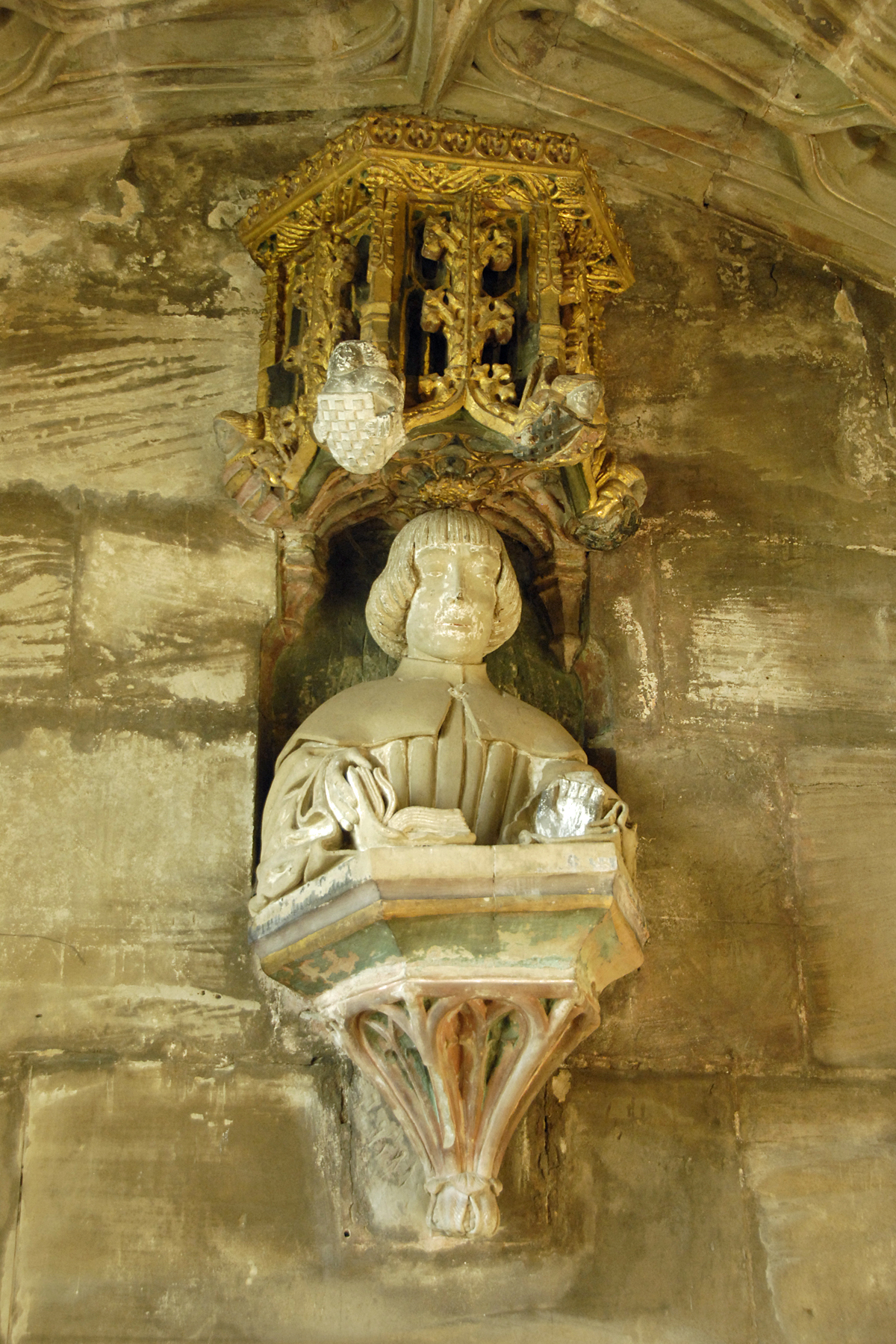
Bust of Arthur Vernon, MA (died 1517)

In the chapel is a bust of Arthur Vernon, son of Sir Henry and Dame Anne Vernon, who died in 1517. The bust is on a corbel and shows Vernon holding a book in his right hand. The left hand is damaged. The miniature fan vaulting above his head replicates the fan vaulting in the chapel itself which is said to be similar to Henry VII's Chapel in Westminster Abbey and a rare example of fan vaulting in Shropshire. (Note: Heather Gilderdale Scott writing in the journal of the British Archaeological Association suggests that the builders of the fan vault in Tong church had access to the original designs of those for Westminster Abbey.) Arthur Vernon is also commemorated in a brasswork set into the floor of the chapel.

=== War memorials ===
There are three 20th-century war memorials in the church. On the chancel arch are separate tablets for parish dead of the First (or 'Great') and Second World Wars. The former's is a brass plaque in a marble surround with crossed swords above a shield at the top, dedicated in glorious and undying memory of those from this parish who gave their lives in the great struggle of right against might. There is also an individual memorial plaque to Humphrey Herbert Orlando Bridgeman who during the first war went missing in action at Roeux in France on 11 May 1917, inscribed with the text from Ephesians: This is a great mystery. (Note: Ephesians chapter 5 verse 32 (Authorised Bible). Partial quote, the full verse reads: This is a great mystery: but I speak concerning Christ and the church.)

== Clergy ==
James Marshall, who was vicar between 1845 and 1857, was noted for only having one arm, (the other was amputated after a shooting accident), and for later converting to Catholicism. He described the parishioners at Tong in negative terms. Upon his transfer to another church he is recorded as saying that "I leave the heathen of Tong as I found them; unconverted and unconvertible".

The Reverend John E Auden was incumbent between 1896 and 1913. He had attempted to sell the Tong Cup to raise funds for the benefice, but found objection to this idea within the community. He authored numerous books including notes on Tong and Tong church and was the uncle of poet W. H. Auden.

The Very Reverend Robert Martin Colquhoun Jeffery (1935–2016) was the priest-in-charge at St Bartholomew's between 1978 and 1987. In his tenure he was made Archdeacon of Salop, which he accepted on condition that he could remain at Tong and oversee the 80 parishes under his control. He was later Dean of Worcester Cathedral and is buried in the churchyard. Jeffery latter penned a book about the church, Discovering Tong: its history, myths & curiosities.

The current incumbent is the Reverend Prebendary Pippa Thorneycroft. Thorneycroft was one of the first women priests to be ordained in 1994 after the General Synod voted to allow women to become full clergy. Thorneycroft was previously a chaplain to Queen Elizabeth II.

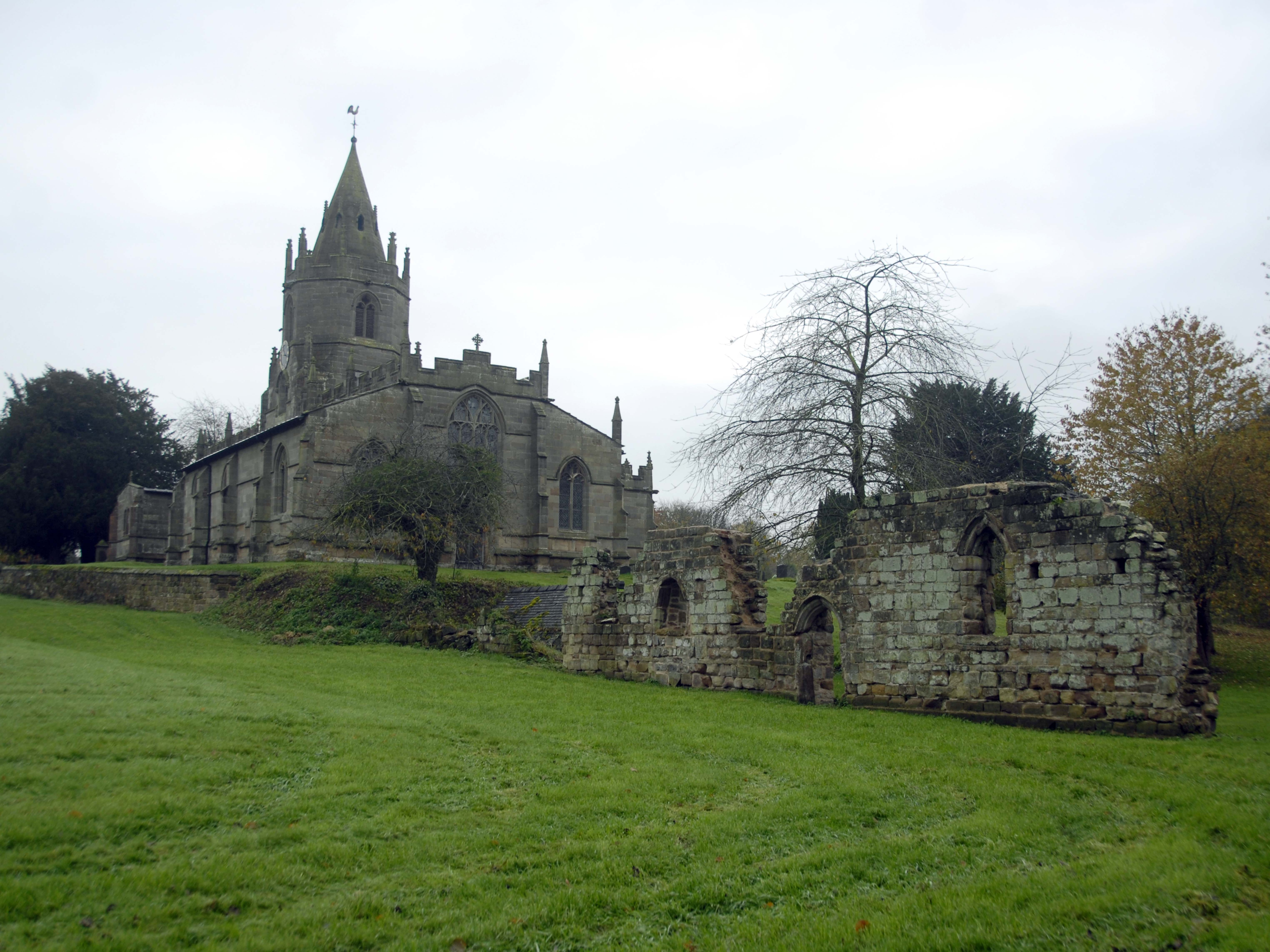
Ruin of the almshouses, with St Bartholomew's church in the background

== See also ==
- Grade I listed buildings in Shropshire
- Listed buildings in Tong, Shropshire
