= Woodbank, Cheshire =

Village in Cheshire, England

Coordinates: 53.249°N 2.967°W

Woodbank
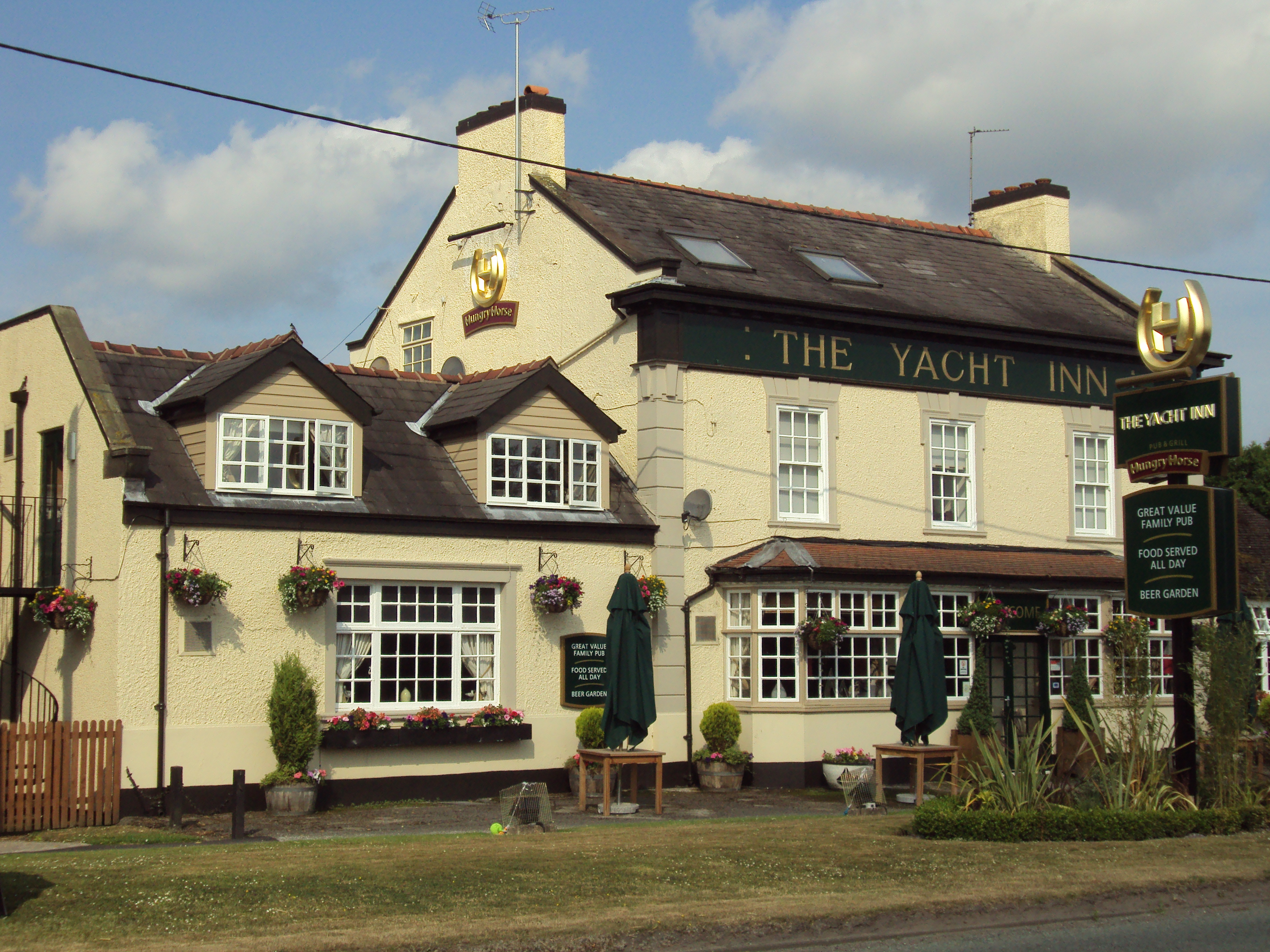
- The Yacht Inn on the A540 Parkgate Road at Woodbank

- Location within Cheshire
- Population: 109 (2011)
- OS grid reference: SJ355729
- Civil parish: Puddington
- Unitary authority: Cheshire West and Chester
- Ceremonial county: Cheshire
- Region: North West
- Country: England
- Sovereign state: United Kingdom
- Post town: CHESTER
- Postcode district: CH1
- Dialling code: 0151, 01244
- Police: Cheshire
- Fire: Cheshire
- Ambulance: North West
- UK Parliament: City of Chester

Woodbank is a village and former civil parish, now in the parish of Puddington, in the unitary authority of Cheshire West and Chester and the ceremonial county of Cheshire in northwest England. It is located on the Wirral Peninsula, about 6 miles northwest of the city of Chester and near the larger village of Saughall. In 2001 the parish had a population of 62.

== History ==
Woodbank was a township in Shotwick parish of the Wirral Hundred and included part of the nearby hamlet of Two Mills, in 1866 Woodbank became a civil parish, The population was 48 in 1801, 64 in 1851, 72 in 1901 and 77 in 1951. The civil parish was abolished on 1 April 2015 and merged into Puddington.

== Community ==
Woodbank is within the parliamentary constituency of the City of Chester, represented by the Labour MP Samantha Dixon. It is also part of the Puddington and District Parish Council.

It can be accessed via the A550, the A5117 and the A540 (a former toll road). There are two minor roads running through the area - Woodbank Lane and Shotwick Lane.

Woodbank consists of a Hall and a few houses as well as The Yacht Inn, which was built as a pub in about 1720, and is on the corner of Shotwick Lane, which leads to the former port of Shotwick on the River Dee.

The nearest railway station can be found in Capenhurst, about 1.5 miles away. There is also a bus service which passes through the area hourly, running between West Kirby and Chester.

== Gallery ==
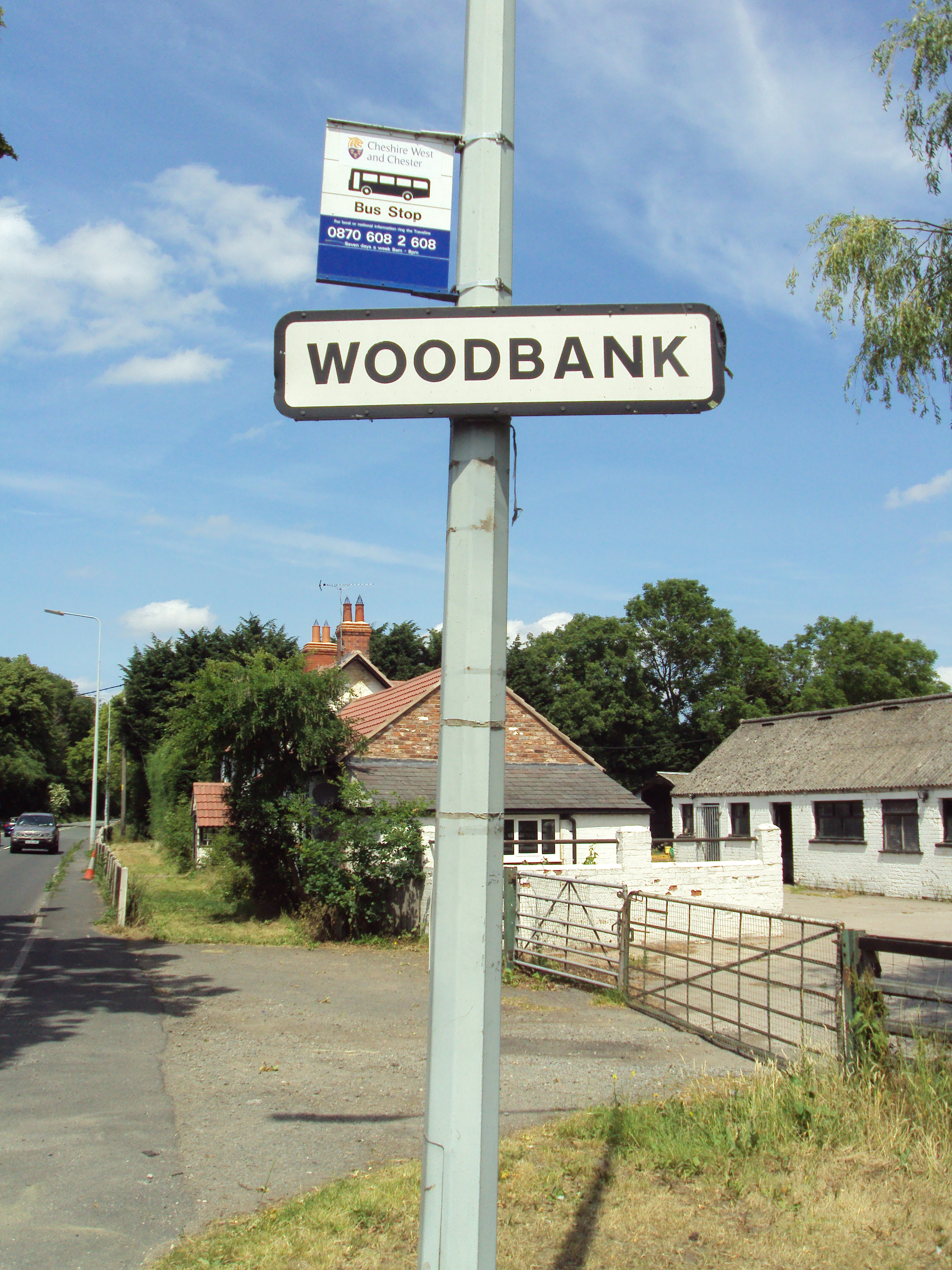
Woodbank sign and bus stop, A540

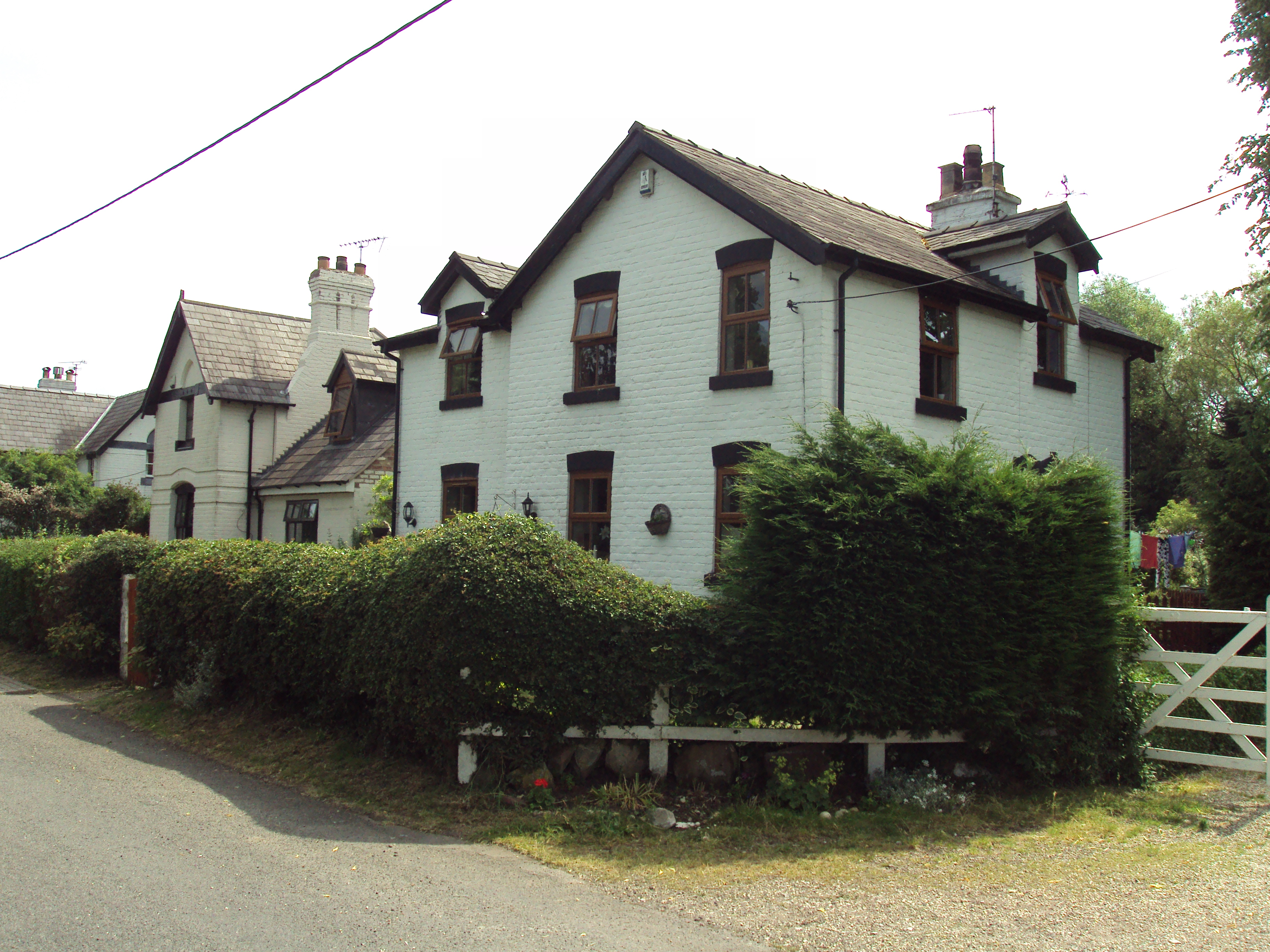
The three Woodbank Hall cottages on Shotwick Lane

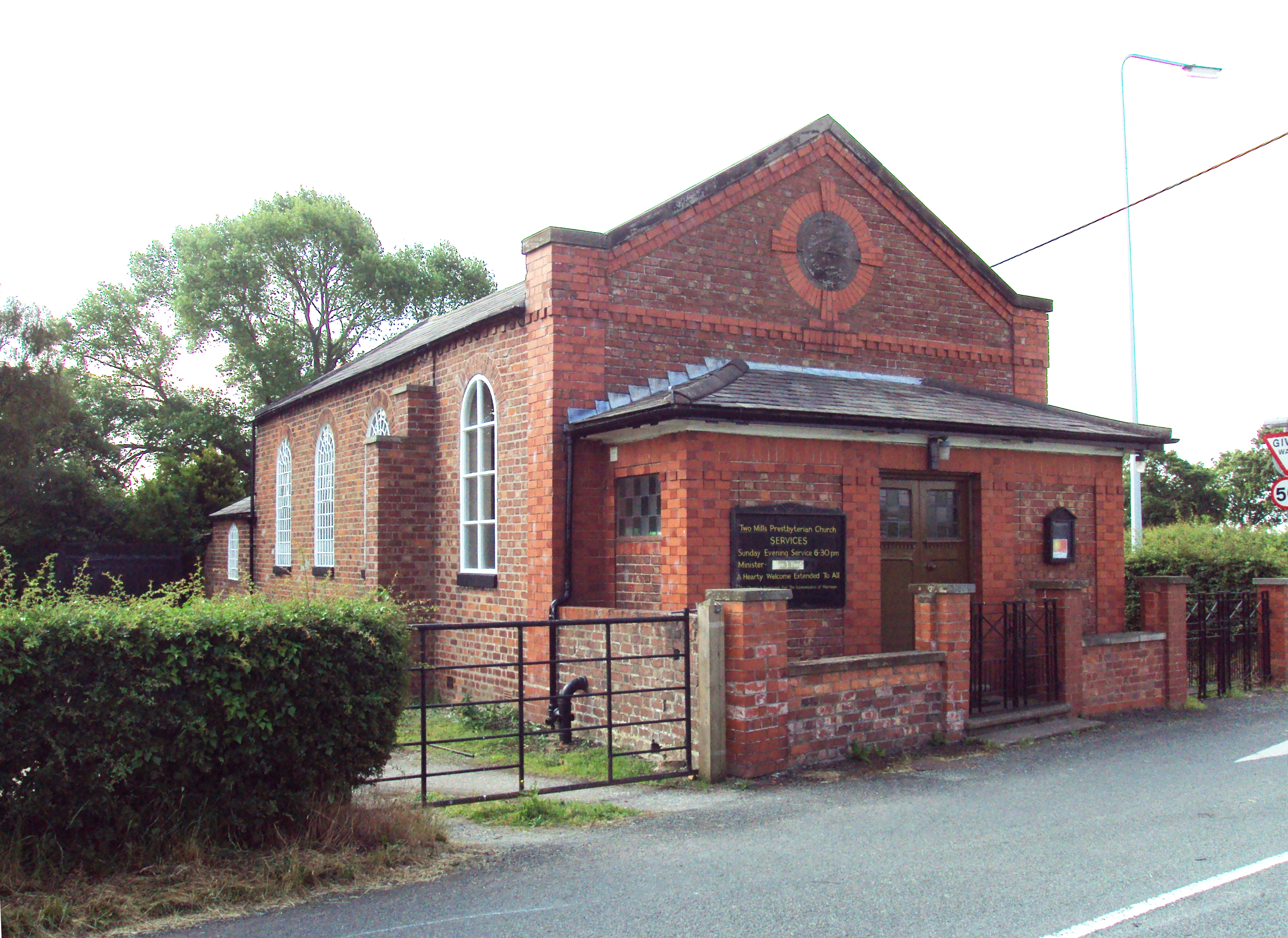
Two Mills Presbyterian Church, Chapel Lane
