= Shotwick Park =

Former civil parish in Cheshire, England

Coordinates: 53.233°N 2.966°W

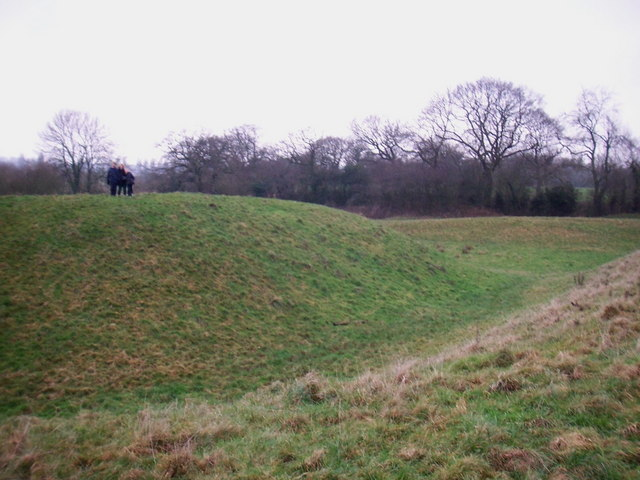
- Shotwick Castle earthworks

- Location within Cheshire
- Population: 56 (2001 census)
- OS grid reference: SJ354711
- Civil parish: Saughall and Shotwick Park/Puddington
- Unitary authority: Cheshire West and Chester
- Ceremonial county: Cheshire
- Region: North West
- Country: England
- Sovereign state: United Kingdom
- Post town: CHESTER
- Postcode district: CH1
- Dialling code: 01244
- Police: Cheshire
- Fire: Cheshire
- Ambulance: North West
- UK Parliament: Chester North and Neston

Shotwick Park is a former civil parish, now in the parishes of Saughall and Shotwick Park and Puddington, in the unitary authority area of Cheshire West and Chester and the ceremonial county of Cheshire, England. Located between the villages of Shotwick and Saughall, it is approximately 8 km (5.0 mi) north west of Chester and close to the Welsh border. Shotwick Park was formerly an extra-parochial area, in 1858 Shotwick Park became a civil parish, on 1 April 2015 the parish was abolished to form "Saughall and Shotwick Park", part also incorporated into the parish of Puddington.

The area is the location of the remnants of Shotwick Castle (grid reference SJ349704), built about 1093 by Hugh Lupus, 1st Earl of Chester. This Norman motte and bailey fortification was constructed as part of the Welsh border defences in the area. The land surrounding the castle became enclosed as a park in 1327. By the 1620s, the castle was in a ruinous condition.

According to the 1831 edition of A Topographical Dictionary of England, Shotwick Park was "an extra-parochial liberty" within the Wirral Hundred. The liberty comprised "970 acres, the soil of which is clay." It became a civil parish in 1858. The population was recorded at 25 in 1801, 13 in 1851, 8 in 1901, 78 in 1951 and 56 in 2001.

Shotwick Park is a rural residential area with communal amenities provided in the nearby village of Saughall. A small industrial estate development also exists at Shotwick Park.

== See also ==
- Listed buildings in Shotwick Park
