= All Saints Church, Great Saughall =

Coordinates: 53.2272°N 2.9552°W

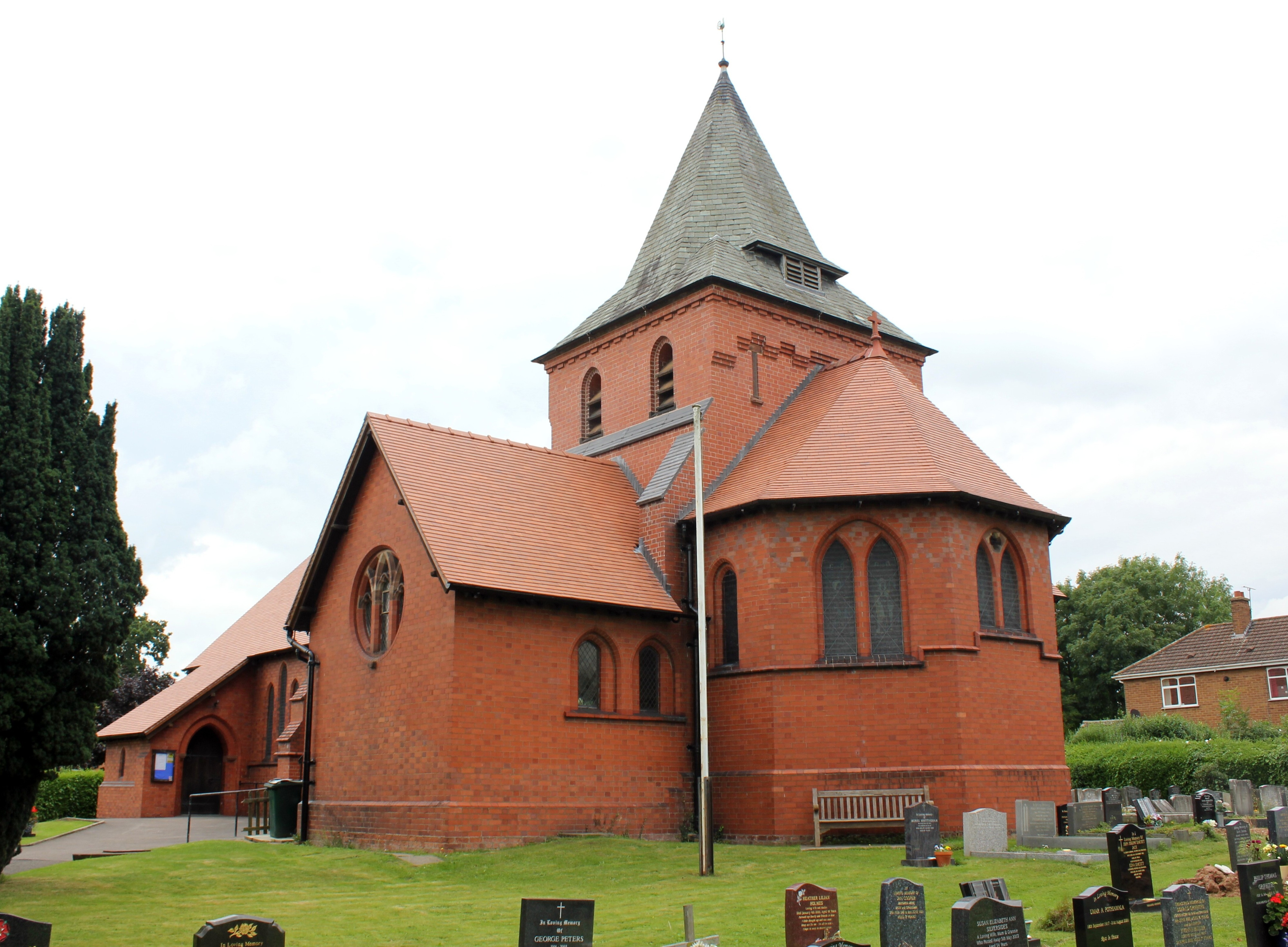
- All Saints Church, Great Saughall, from the southeast

- Location in Cheshire
- OS grid reference: SJ 363 704
- Location: Church Road, Saughall, Cheshire
- Country: England
- Denomination: Anglican
- Website: All Saints, Saughall

History
- Status: Parish church
- Consecrated: 23 October 1901

Architecture
- Functional status: Active
- Heritage designation: Grade II
- Designated: 10 October 1985
- Architect(s): J. Medland Taylor; Isaac Taylor
- Architectural type: Church
- Style: Gothic Revival
- Groundbreaking: 1895
- Completed: 1910

Specifications
- Materials: Brick, tiled roofs Slate roof to the spire

Administration
- Province: York
- Diocese: Chester
- Archdeaconry: Chester
- Deanery: Wirral, South
- Parish: All Saints, Great Saughall

Clergy
- Vicar: Dave Nugent

All Saints Church, Great Saughall, is located in Church Road in the civil parish of Saughall and Shotwick Park, formerly Saughall and before that Great Saughall, in the county of Cheshire, England. It is an active Anglican parish church in the deanery of Wirral South, the archdeaconry of Chester, and the diocese of Chester. The church is recorded in the National Heritage List for England as a designated Grade II listed building.

== History ==
All Saints was built as a chapel of ease to St Michael's Church, Shotwick. The foundation stone was laid on 31 July 1895 by the Honorable Mrs Trelawny of Shotwick House. It was designed by the Manchester architect J. Medland Taylor, and built at an estimated cost of £1,288 (equivalent to £150,000 in 2025). It opened for worship in 1896, and was consecrated by Francis Jayne, Bishop of Chester, on 23 October 1901. The church was expanded in 1909–10, the architect being Isaac Taylor. The expansion consisted of a north aisle, a spire on the tower and, at the east end, a chancel, sanctuary, organ chamber, and vestry. The parishioners paid for the new aisle, and the rest was donated by the Vernon family, then living at Shotwick House. The expanded church was consecrated by the bishop of Chester on 4 January 1911. All Saints became a separate parish in its own right in 1921. During the last years of the 20th century the aisle was partitioned off to provide a meeting room with modern facilities.

== Architecture ==
The church is constructed in red Ruabon brick The body of the church has a tiled roof, and the tower is roofed in Lakeland green slate. Its plan consists of a four-bay nave and north aisle with a projecting baptistry at the west end, a south porch, north and south transepts, a short chancel with a polygonal apse, and a central tower. The tower contains louvred bell openings and a corbel table. It is surmounted by a broach spire containing more louvred openings. The windows in the nave are triple lancets; those in the apse are double lancets, the east window having its base higher than the lateral windows. The windows in the aisle have either two or four lights.

Inside the church is a four-bay arcade. In the chancel is an opus sectile reredos made by Powells. On the ceiling of the apse is a painting by Herman Saloman depicting the Angels Appearing to the Shepherds. The two-manual organ was built in 1918 by Poyser of Chester.

== External features ==
The churchyard contains five war graves, containing four soldiers of World War I, and an Aircraftwoman of World War II.

== See also ==
- Listed buildings in Saughall
