= Listed buildings in Shotwick =

Shotwick is a former civil parish, now in the parish of Puddington, in Cheshire West and Chester, England. It contains 23 buildings that are recorded in the National Heritage List for England as designated listed buildings. Of these, one is listed at Grade I, the highest grade, two are listed at Grade II*, the middle grade, and the others are at Grade II. Apart from the village of Shotwick, the parish is entirely rural. Most of the listed buildings are in the village, and include houses, St Michael's Church and structures in the churchyard, and Shotwick Hall with associated structures. Outside the village, the listed buildings are domestic or related to farming.

== Key ==
Grade	Criteria
I	Buildings of exceptional interest, sometimes considered to be internationally important
II*	Particularly important buildings of more than special interest
II	Buildings of national importance and special interest

== Buildings ==
Name and location	Photograph	Date	Notes	Grade
St Michael's Church; 53.2388°N 2.9952°W		Late 11th century	St Michael's has a Norman south doorway, the body of the church dates from the 14th century, the tower is late Perpendicular in style, the south porch dates from the 17th century, and the church was restored in 1851. It is built in red sandstone, the roofs of the chancel and porch are in Welsh slate and the rest of the roofs are tiled. The church consists of a nave, a north aisle with a chapel at the west end, a chancel, a south porch, and a west tower with an embattled parapet.	I
Woodbine Cottage; 53.23901°N 2.99478°W		16th century (or earlier)	The cottage originated as a single-story farmhouse with cob walls. The exterior dates from the 17th century, and the upper storey was added in the 19th century. It is constructed in brick on a stone plinth, and has a Welsh slate roof. The house is in two storeys and has a symmetrical three-bay front. In the lateral bays are sash windows, and the windows on the sides are casements.	II
Manor Farmhouse; 53.23934°N 2.99377°W		16th century (probable)	The farmhouse was rebuilt in the late 17th century, windows were replaced in the 19th century, and it was modernised in 1984. It is built in brick with a concrete tile roof, and has a massive chimney stack. The building is in two storeys, and has a four-bay front. The windows are casements, and the door in the second bay is approached by two steps.	II
Shotwick Hall; 53.24134°N 2.99425°W		1662	This was built as a manor house, and is constructed in brick with red sandstone quoins and a Welsh slate roof. The house has an E-shaped plan, is in two storeys with an attic, and has a symmetrical five-bay front. The end bays project forward, and are gabled with finials. The two-storey porch also projects forward and has a stepped gable; the room in the upper floor of the porch was originally an oratory. The windows are mullioned and transomed.	II*
Garden walls and gate piers, Shotwick Hall; 53.24126°N 2.99458°W		c. 1665	The garden walls and gate piers at the front of the house are in brick with red sandstone dressings. The walls stand on a stone plinth. The lateral and intermediate gate piers have stone framing and moulded capstones; the central piers supporting the gates are larger with ball finials.	II*
Kitchen or bakehouse, Shotwick Hall; 53.24146°N 2.99426°W		Late 17th century	This building was later altered. It is in brick with a Welsh slate roof, it has two storeys, a two-bay front, and a massive brick chimney. The building contains two doors, and horizontal-sliding sash windows.	II
Derelict stable, Shotwick Hall; 53.24177°N 2.99452°W	—	Late 17th century	This is a former stable and granary in brick with red sandstone quoins, but without a roof. It is in two storeys and has a three-bay front. On the left side is a flight of steps, and the rear wall contains ventilation slots.	II
Church Cottage and outbuildings 53.23875°N 2.99459°W		Late 17th century	This is a farmhouse with farm buildings, which have since been altered. The house is in brick, partly on a stone plinth, with a Welsh slate roof. It is in two storeys with a three-bay front. The windows are casements. To the left of the house is the former stable, and to the right a shippon.	II
Greyhound Farmhouse; 53.23925°N 2.99398°W		Late 17th century	This originated as an inn and a manor courthouse. It became a farmhouse, and was later converted into a house. The building is in brick on a stone plinth, with red sandstone dressings and a Welsh slate roof. It is in two storeys over a cellar, and has a seven-bay front. The right four bays are from the original house, and the other three bays are from a farm building that was later incorporated into the house.	II
Vicarage Farmhouse; 53.23921°N 2.99457°W		Late 17th century	The farmhouse was extended and the roof raised in the early 19th century. It is built in brick and has a Welsh slate roof. The farmhouse is in two storeys with a five-bay front. The windows are small-pane iron casements with intersecting tracery.	II
Briscoe tombchest (1704); 53.23864°N 2.99520°W		1704	A tombchest in ashlar buff sandstone to William Briscoe (who died in 1704) and members of his family. It is rectangular with panels on the sides, and inscriptions on the top.	II
Sundial; 53.23858°N 2.99527°W		1720	The sundial consists of an ashlar red sandstone baluster, with a plate dated 1767. It has a circular capstone, with a brass plate and a pierced gnomon. The baluster and plate are inscribed with the initials or names of churchwardens, and dates.	II
Briscoe tombchest (1723); 53.23870°N 2.99514°W		1723	A tombchest in ashlar yellow sandstone to William Briscoe (who died in 1723) and members of his family. It is rectangular with panels on the sides, and a long inscription in a semicircular headed border on the top.	II
Farm buildings, Shotwick Hall; 53.24191°N 2.99438°W		Early 18th century	The farm buildings consist of a threshing barn and shippons. They are in an L-shaped plan, built in brick and have roofs partly of Welsh slate, and partly of corrugated asbestos. The buildings contain doors and ventilation slots.	II
Reay tombchest 53.23864°N 2.99533°W		1767 or earlier	A tombchest in ashlar red sandstone to Revd M. Reay and four children. On the sides are panels and fluting. There is a cornice and, on the top, an inscription.	II
Church House Farmhouse; 53.23888°N 2.99485°W		Late 18th century	The farmhouse is built in brick on a sandstone plinth, and has a Welsh slate roof. It is in two storeys, and has a three-bay front. The lateral bays contain three-light wooden casement windows. The door is approached by two stone steps.	II
Two Mills Farmhouse; 53.25205°N 2.97415°W	—	Late 18th century	The farmhouse is built in brick with a Welsh slate roof. It has a double-pile plan, is in two storeys, and has an almost symmetrical three-bay south front. To the rear is a 19th-century extension. The windows are all sashes, apart from one casement window in the extension.	II
Phillips tombchest 53.23854°N 2.99526°W		1780	A tombchest in ashlar red sandstone to James Phillips. On the sides are panels and fluting. There is a cornice and, on the top, an inscription.	II
Bennett tombstone 53.23863°N 2.99524°W		1787	A tombchest in ashlar buff sandstone to John Nevett Bennett. On the sides are panels and gadrooning. On the top is an inscription.	II
Ellison tombchest 53.23864°N 2.99543°W		1812	A tombchest in buff sandstone to Robert and Martha Ellison, It is in Neoclassical style, with pilasters, circular bosses carved with acanthus leaves, and gadrooning.	II
Rock Cottage; 53.24971°N 2.97120°W	—	Early 19th century	A cottage built in ashlar red sandstone with a Welsh slate roof. It has two storeys, and a three-bay front. A gabled porch projects forward from the right bay. The windows are iron small-pane casements under segmental heads.	II
Gates, gate piers and churchyard walls 53.23878°N 2.99484°W		Early 19th century (probable)	The gate piers and wall are made from red sandstone blocks, and the gates from iron. The gate piers have domed tops. There are two gates, one with an overthrow and lantern. An iron ring is attached to the west end of the wall.	II
Stone Cottage and outbuilding 53.23944°N 2.99346°W		Early to mid-19th century	The cottage is built in ashlar red sandstone and has a concrete tile roof. It is in one and two storeys, and has a four-bay front. The windows are casements, and the door is approached by three stone steps. To the right is a shippon with a door approached by two steps. To the right of this is a lean-two and a tall stone wall with rounded coping.	II

== See also ==
- Listed buildings in Puddington
- Listed buildings in Shotwick Park
