= Listed buildings in Shotwick Park =

Shotwick Park is a civil parish in Cheshire West and Chester, England. It contains two buildings that are recorded in the National Heritage List for England as designated listed buildings, both of which are listed at Grade II. This grade is the lowest of the three gradings given to listed buildings and is applied to "buildings of national importance and special interest". The parish is entirely rural and the listed buildings are structures associated with Shotwicklodge Farm.

Name and location	Photograph	Date	Notes
Barn, Shotwicklodge Farm; 53.23584°N 2.97291°W		16th century	The barn is in two storeys. It is timber-framed with brick infill in the lower storey and weatherboarding above. There is a corrugated iron roof. It has a long rectangular plan extending for seven bays. In the upper storey are square wooden pitch holes.
Granary, Shotwicklodge Farm; 53.23535°N 2.97262°W		1653 (probable)	The granary is above a stable, and is built in brick with red sandstone dressings on a stone plinth, and with a Welsh slate roof. It is in two storeys with a two-bay front. It contains blocked four-centred arches, a two-light sliding sash window, and a flight of external steps.

== See also ==
- Listed buildings in Puddington
- Listed buildings in Saughall
- Listed buildings in Shotwick
