= Puddington Hall =

Country house in Cheshire, England

Coordinates: 53.25199°N 3.00603°W

Puddington Hall is a country house in the village of Puddington, Cheshire, England. It was built between 1872 and 1874 for Sir Rowland Stanley Errington, and altered in about 1904. It has since been divided into two houses. The older part of the house is constructed in red sandstone; the later part is partly timber-framed and partly pebbledashed. It is roofed with stone slates. The house is in two storeys plus attics, with an entrance front of six bays. It is recorded in the National Heritage List for England as a designated Grade II listed building.

== See also ==
- Listed buildings in Puddington, Cheshire
- Puddington Old Hall
