= Puddington Old Hall =

Country house in Cheshire, England

Coordinates: 53.25245°N 3.01142°W

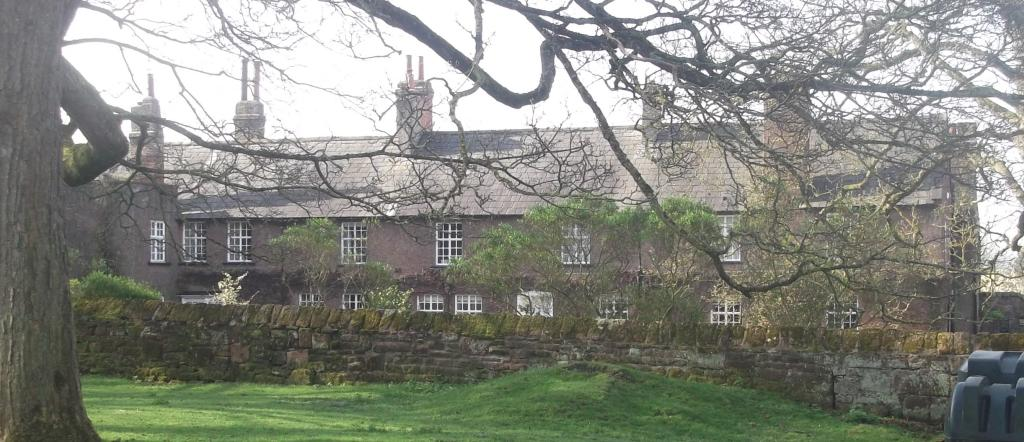

Puddington Old Hall stands on a former moated site in the village of Puddington, Cheshire, England. It is sited near the England–Wales border, overlooking the Dee estuary.

== History ==
The house originated in the 15th century as a timber-framed house with a quadrangular plan surrounding a central courtyard. Three sides of the building are still present. It was built for the Masseys, a prominent Jacobite family. During the Popish Plot, John Plessington, tutor to the Massey children and a Catholic priest was seized at the house, and hanged at Chester Castle in 1679. The house was re-walled in the early 18th century, and there are some additions dated 1909. The building has since been divided into two houses and a flat.

== Architecture ==
Puddington Old Hall is timber-framed, with roughcast brick cladding on the outer walls. It is roofed with Welsh slates and has a stone ridge. The 15th-century timber framing is still visible in the inner walls. There is close studding on the north and west ranges. The plan of the house consists of three ranges around a courtyard. It has two storeys with attics. On the south side of the courtyard is an open gallery above a cloister. The house is designated by English Heritage as a Grade II* listed building.

== Associated structures ==
Associated with the hall are three structures designated as Grade II listed buildings. To the north of the hall is a dovecote dating from the later part of the 18th century. It is constructed in brick, and has a pyramidal roof of Welsh slates with a stone ridge. The structure is in two storeys with a square plan. Also to the north of the hall is a courtyard of farm buildings dating from the late 17th and the 18th centuries. To the west of the house is an outbuilding dating from the 18th and 19th centuries that formerly comprised a stable and a dovecote.

== See also ==
- Listed buildings in Puddington, Cheshire
- Puddington Hall
