= Shotwick House =

Grade II listed English country house in the United kingdom

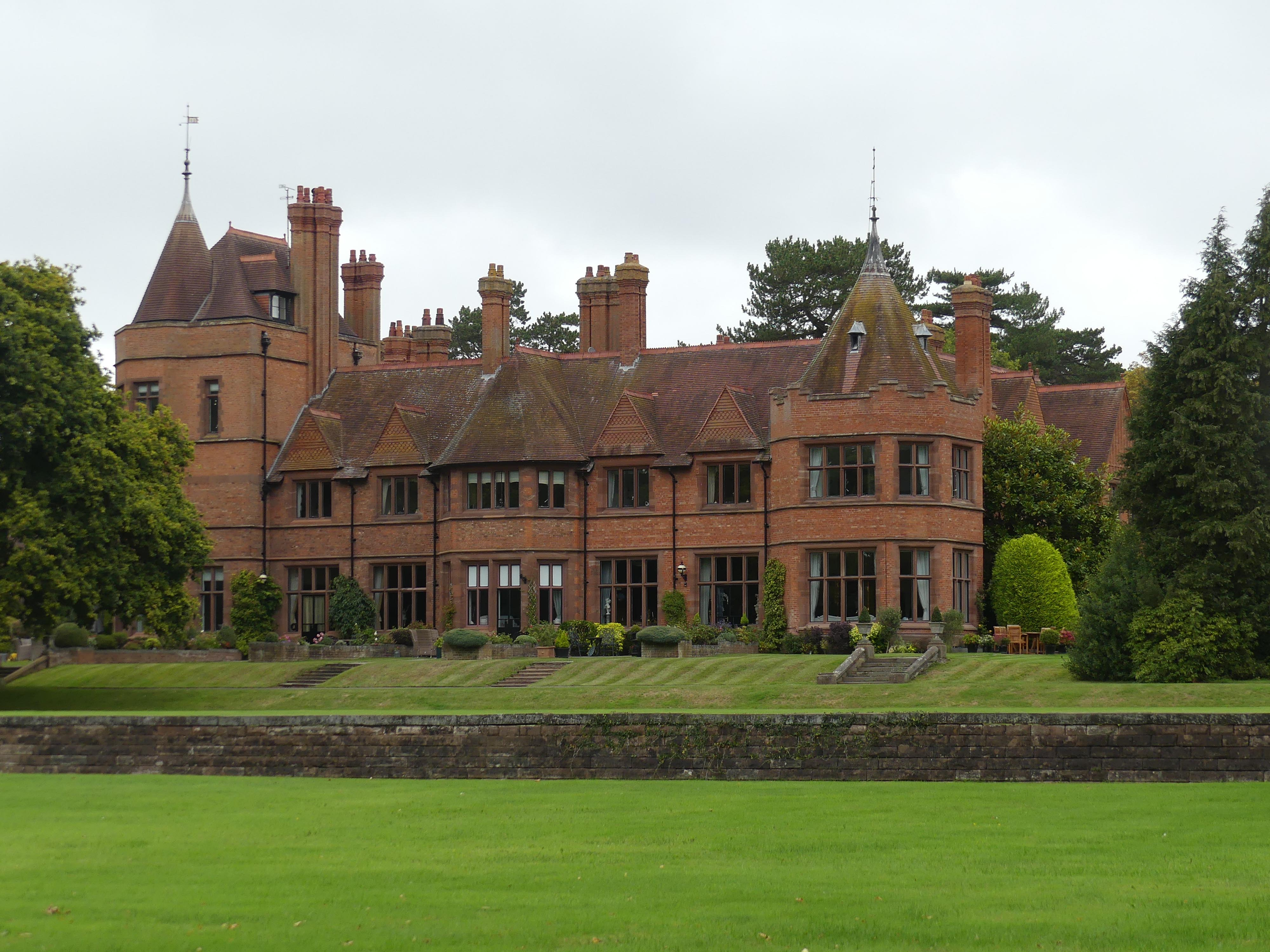
- Shotwick House in 2022

- Location in Cheshire
- 53.2256°N 2.9631°W
- Location: Great Saughall, Cheshire, England
- OS grid reference: SJ 358 702

History
- Built: 1872
- Built for: Horace Dormer Trelawney
- Rebuilt: 1907

Site notes
- Architect: John Douglas
- Architectural style: Neo-Elizabethan
- Restored by: Thorneycroft Vernon

Listed Building – Grade II
- Designated: 10 October 1985
- Reference no.: 1115438

Shotwick House (originally known as Shotwick Park) is a large house in Great Saughall, Cheshire, England. It is recorded in the National Heritage List for England as a designated Grade II listed building.

== History ==
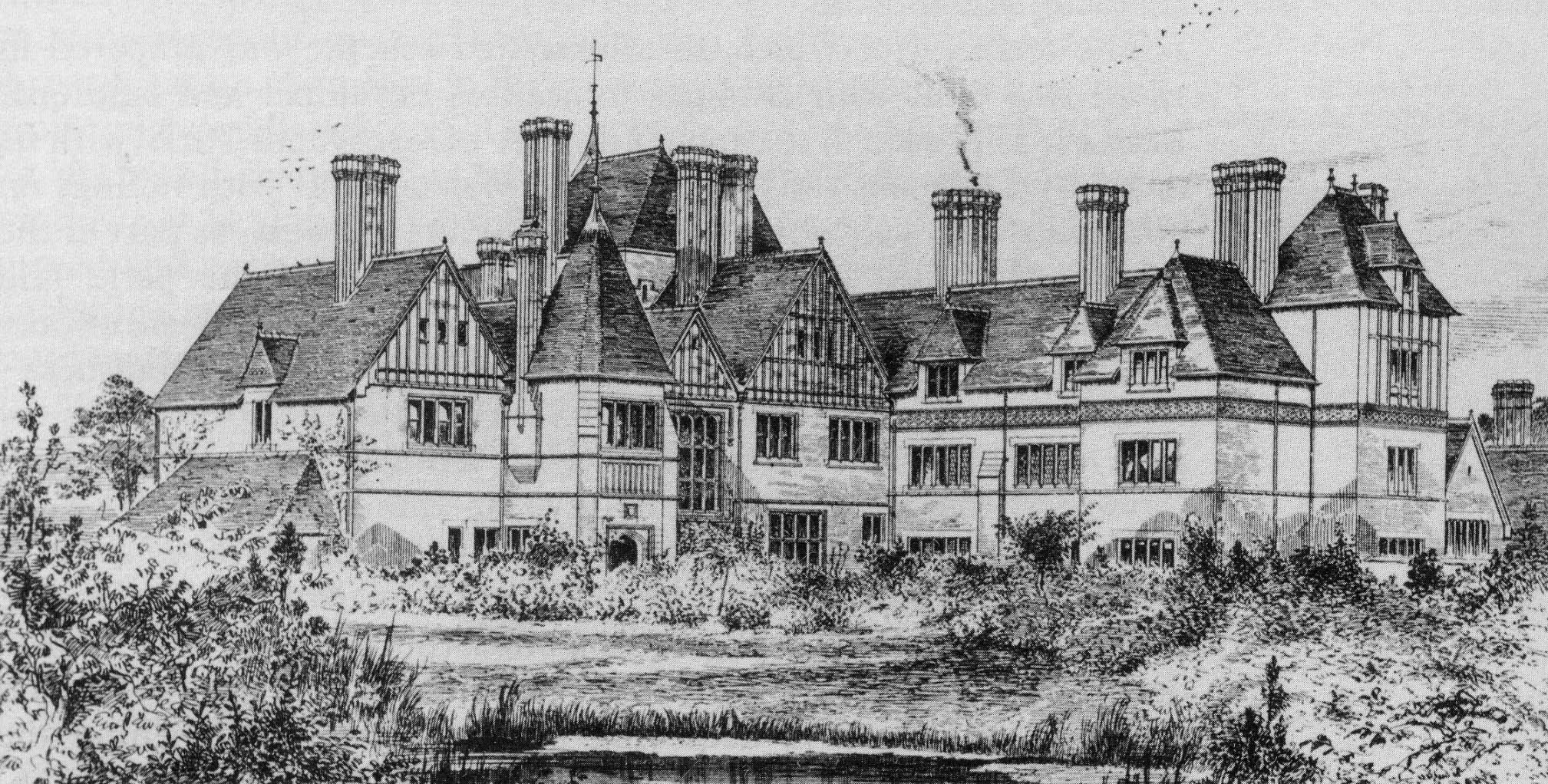
The entrance front of Shotwick Park in about 1879

The house was built in 1872 for Horace Dormer Trelawny and designed by the Chester architect John Douglas. In 1907 it was damaged by fire and following this it was rebuilt and extended, the architect again being John Douglas; at this time the owner was Thorneycroft Vernon. In the later part of the 20th century it was in use as a nursing home. Its stable courtyard, also designed by John Douglas, is listed at Grade II.

== Architecture ==
Shotwick Park is built in brick with a tiled roof in neo-Elizabethan style. The main front has seven bays with each external bay forming a turret; the turret on the left is larger and higher than that on the right. Both turrets are polygonal in shape, each with a pyramidal roof having a lead finial and a weather vane. The front has two storeys, other than the left turret that has three storeys. The central bay projects forwards and is canted. The roofs are steeply-sloping and are hipped; over each of the central five bays is a hipped gable. Tall chimneys rise from the roofs.

The architectural historian Nikolaus Pevsner in the Buildings of England series describes it as a "fine" house. In Douglas' biography, Edward Hubbard refers to its "massive solidity and indefinable form, its heavy hipped and gabled roofs and its elaborate use of brick". The architectural writers Figueirdo and Treuherz comment that the house "is an effective composition from a distance, but close to, the detailing is dull".

== See also ==
- Listed buildings in Saughall
- List of houses and associated buildings by John Douglas
