= John Plessington =

English Roman Catholic saint

Saint John Plessington
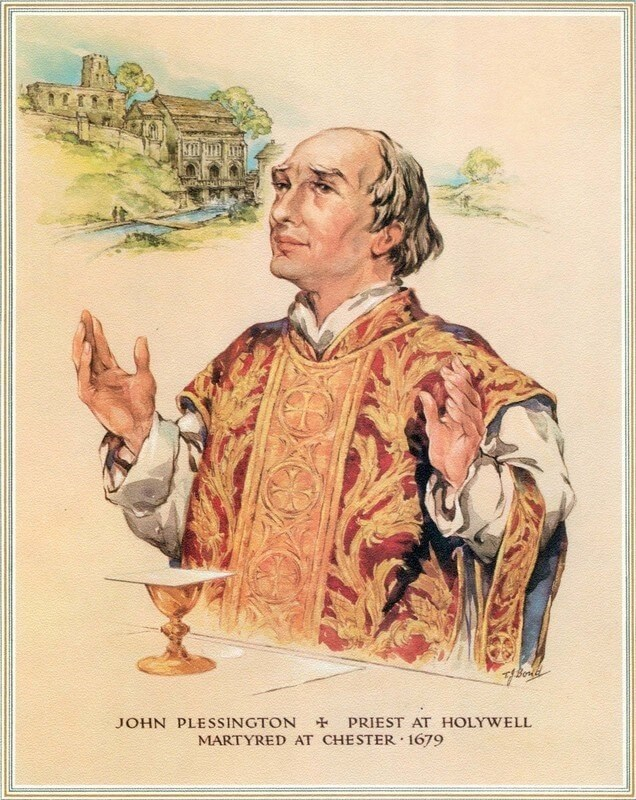

Priest and Martyr
- Born: c. 1637; Dimples Hall, Garstang, Lancashire, England
- Died: 19 July 1679 (aged 41 - 42); Gallow's Hill, Boughton, Cheshire
- Honored in: Roman Catholic Church
- Beatified: 15 December 1929 by Pope Pius XI
- Canonized: 25 October 1970 by Pope Paul VI
- Feast: 19 July (individual); 25 October (together with Forty Martyrs of England and Wales)
- Attributes: Chaucible, chalice, Eucharist, rosary, martyr's palm

John Plessington (c. 1637 – 19 July 1679), also known as John Plesington, William Scarisbrick and William Pleasington, was an English Catholic priest who was executed by the English Crown for violating the ban on the presence of Catholic priests in the kingdom. He is now venerated as a saint, honored as one of the Catholic Forty Martyrs of England and Wales.

== Life ==
He was born at Dimples Hall, Garstang, Lancashire, the son of Robert Plessington, a Royalist and Catholic, and his wife Alice Rawstone, a family thus persecuted for both their religious and political beliefs. He was educated by the Jesuits at Scarisbrick Hall, then at the Royal College of Saint Alban at Valladolid, Spain, and then at Saint Omer Seminary in France. He was ordained in Segovia, Spain, on 25 March 1662. He returned to England in 1663 ministering to covert Catholics in the areas of Holywell and Cheshire, often hiding under the name John Scarisbrick. He was also tutor at Puddington Old Hall near Chester. Upon arrest in Chester during the Popish Plot scare caused by Titus Oates, he was imprisoned for two months, and then hanged, drawn and quartered for the crime of being a Catholic priest. From the scaffold at Gallow's Hill in Boughton, Cheshire, he made the following declaration:

But I know it will be said that a priest ordayned by authority derived from the See of Rome is, by the Law of the Nation, to die as a Traytor, but if that be so what must become of all the Clergymen of the Church of England, for the first Protestant Bishops had their Ordination from those of the Church of Rome, or not at all, as appears by their own writers so that Ordination comes derivatively from those now living.

John Plessington was beatified in 1929 by Pope Pius XI, and on 25 October 1970 was canonized as one of the group known as the Forty Martyrs by Pope Paul VI.

== Memorial ==
There is a memorial tablet to him located in the entrance porch of St Werburgh's Catholic Church, Grosvenor Park Road, Chester, just a short distance from where he was executed. In 1980 his name was added to the base of the granite obelisk nearby that was erected in 1898 for the Protestant martyr George Marsh in Boughton, which has the following inscription:

John Plessington Catholic Priest, martyred here on 19th July 1679. Canonised Saint 25th October 1970

There is now a Catholic school called St. John Plessington in Wirral, England which won TES School of the Year 2010 out of England, Wales, Ireland and Scotland.

== Remains ==
In the early 21st century, a set of human bones found in an old trunk in Wales came to be regarded as possibly being Plessington's remains. They had been found in the late 19th century, wrapped in 17th-century clothing, in a pub in Holywell, Flintshire, which had been known to be a secret gathering place for the Catholics of the region to worship covertly. This had been the region where he had carried out his ministry before his arrest. Showing signs of violence, the bones had been considered those of some anonymous martyrs of the period and entrusted to a community of the Society of Jesus in nearby Tremeirchion.

When a grave believed to have been Plessington's was opened in 1962 as part of the process for his beatification, it was found to contain the remains of a younger man. Interest later focused on this set of remains. In 2015, Mark Davies, Roman Catholic Bishop of Shrewsbury, started a campaign to raise the funds for the testing of the DNA of the bones.
