= Shotwick Hall =

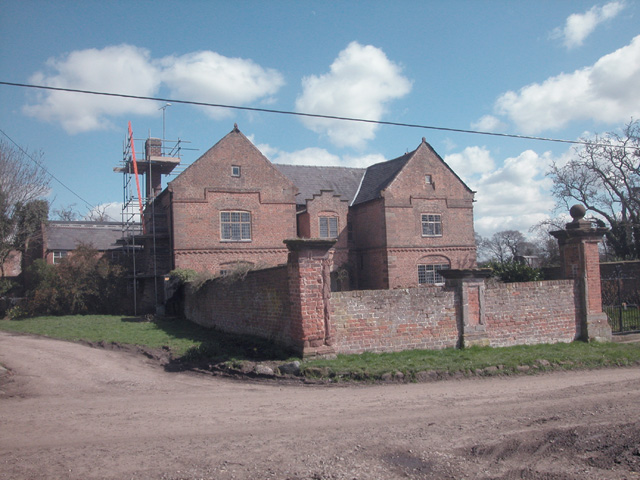
- Shotwick Hall

- Location in Cheshire
- 53.24134°N 2.99426°W
- Location: Shotwick, Cheshire, England
- OS grid reference: SJ 337 721

History
- Built: 1662
- Built for: Joseph Hockenhull

Listed Building – Grade II*
- Designated: 4 June 1952
- Reference no.: 1115124

Shotwick Hall is a former manor house in the village of Shotwick, Cheshire, England. It replaced an earlier manor house that stood on a moated site some 150 metres to the west. The hall and four associated structures are listed buildings, and the moated site is a Scheduled Monument.

== History ==
The house was built in 1662 for Joseph Hockenhull, replacing an older fortified manor house. Internal alterations were made during the 20th century. The hall is recorded in the National Heritage List for England as a designated Grade II* listed building.

== Architecture ==
=== Exterior ===
Shotwick Hall is a small house constructed of brick. It has red sandstone quoins, a Welsh slate roof, and large brick chimneys. The house has an E-shaped plan with two storeys and attics. The front is symmetrical with five bays. The lateral bays are wide and project forward; they have plain brick gables with finials. The central bay is much narrower and also projects forward, forming a two-storey porch. It has a stepped stone gable. Between the floors is a dentil brick band. Above the upper floor windows is a band that rises over the windows to form a hoodmould. The windows date from the 20th century and have wooden mullions and transoms. The window above the door has two lights; all the other windows on the front have three.

=== Interior ===
The front door leads to a small hall with a Jacobean-style open well staircase. This has pierced flat balusters, moulded handrails and square newels. Under the staircase the plaster ceiling has a moulded frieze decorated with fleur-de-lis and lions. In one of the rooms are the arms of Shotwick quartered with those of Hockenhull and bearing the date 1662.

== Associated external features ==
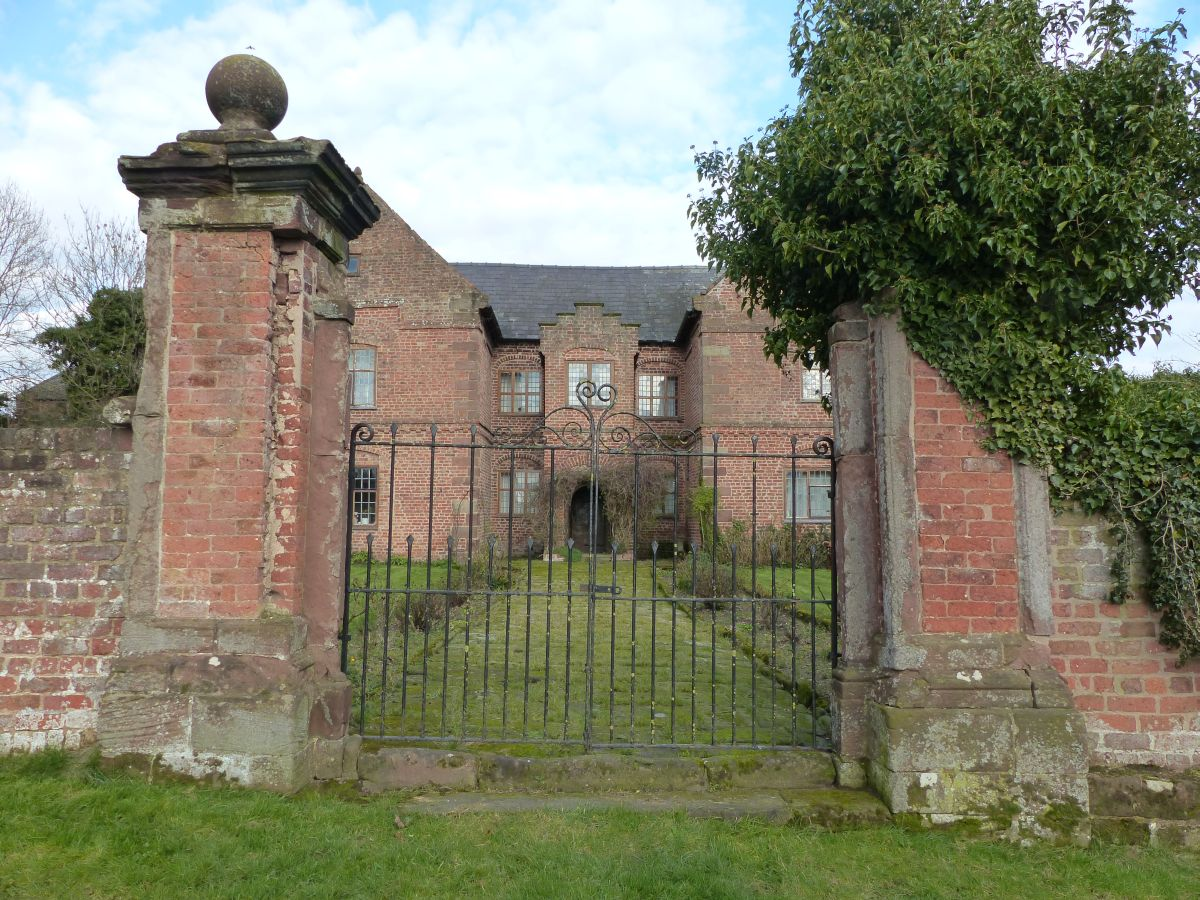
Gates of Shotwick Hall

In front of the house is a square garden surrounded by brick walls with red sandstone dressings. The front wall has a pair of central gate piers, piers at the corners, and intermediate piers. The corner and intermediate piers have moulded capstones. The gate piers are taller and are surmounted by ball finials. The north wall is plain with a stone coping; the south wall has a ramp, buttresses internally, and a gateway has been inserted. The walls and gate piers are listed at Grade II*. Three structures nearby are listed at Grade II. Attached to the northeast corner of the hall is a brick two-storey building dating from the late 17th century, with later alterations. This was formerly a kitchen and bakehouse. To the north of the hall is a brick two-storey stable dating from the later part of the 17th century that is derelict and roofless. Further to the north is an L-shaped brick building dating from the early 18th and early 19th centuries consisting of a threshing barn and shippons (cowsheds). Some 150 metres to the west of the hall is a moated site formerly occupied by the earlier hall. It measures about 25 by 32 metres, and is raised by about 0.5 metres above the surrounding ground. The moat is about 10 metres wide and is partly silted. The site has been designated as a Scheduled Monument.

== See also ==
- Grade II* listed buildings in Cheshire West and Chester
- Listed buildings in Shotwick
