= Listed buildings in Saughall =

Saughall is a former civil parish now in the parishes of Saughall and Shotwick Park, Puddington and the unparished area of Chester, in Cheshire West and Chester, England. It contains eleven buildings that are recorded in the National Heritage List for England as designated listed buildings, all of which are listed at Grade II. This grade is the lowest of the three gradings given to listed buildings and is applied to "buildings of national importance and special interest". The parish contains the village of Saughall, and is otherwise rural. Most of the listed buildings are houses and associated structures. The others include a former inn, a former windmill, a church, and two guideposts.

Name and location	Photograph	Date	Notes
Old Swinging Gate Inn; 53.2228°N 2.9598°W		17th century or earlier	Originating as an inn, later converted into a house, its basic structure is timber-framed, later encased in brick. The building stands on a solid rock base, and has a Welsh slate roof. It has an L-shaped plan, is in two storeys, and has a four-bay front. The windows are sashes, and the doorway is approached by seven steps.
Bridge Farmhouse; 53.2226°N 2.9606°W		17th century	The farmhouse is in two storeys, and has a three-bay front. The right two bays are timber-framed with brick nogging on a sandstone plinth. The left bay was added in the 18th century, and is in brick painted to resemble timber-framing. The roof is in Welsh slate, and the porch is gabled.
Poplars Farmhouse; 53.2147°N 2.9430°W	—	17th century	The farmhouse was extensively reconstructed in 1821. It is built in brick and has a Welsh slate roof. The farmhouse has an F-shaped plan, is in two storeys, and has a four-bay front. The first and third bays project forward, and have shaped gables. There is another, similar, gable on the right side. The windows are 20th-century casements.
Aldersey House; 53.2243°N 2.9581°W		Early 18th century	The house was extended and remodelled in about 1830. It is built in brick with a Welsh slate roof. The house is in two storeys, and has a four-bay front. The windows are sashes. Above the door is a fanlight containing a lunette.
Gibbet Windmill; 53.24299°N 2.95548°W		Late 18th century	A former windmill that has been converted into a house. It is built in brick with a weatherboarded and shingled cap. The house is in three storeys with a basement. Sails have been added, which are copies of the originals, and do not rotate. To the south is a 20th-century extension.
Fruit Farm Cottages; 53.2343°N 2.9449°W	—	Early 19th century	A pair of brick cottages with a slate roof. The cottages are in two storeys, and each has a single-bay front. The windows have iron cast iron Gothic Revival frames, and contain casements under Tudor arched heads. Above the doors are blocked fanlights with semicircular heads.
Shotwick House; 53.2256°N 2.9631°W		1872	The house was designed by John Douglas for Horace Dormer Trelawny. It was damaged by fire in 1907, and rebuilt and extended, again by Douglas. The house is built in brick with a red tile roof. It has an E-plan, is in two and three storeys, and has an almost symmetrical garden front of seven bays. Its features include a large polygonal bay window and a tower.
Stable courtyard, Shotwick House; 53.2262°N 2.9629°W	—	c. 1875	Designed by John Douglas for Horace Dormer Trelawny, the stables are arranged around three sides of a courtyard. They are built in brick with a red tile roof. The features include a square clock tower with a pyramidal lead roof surmounted by a finial, diapered gables, windows that are mullioned, or mullioned and transomed, pitch holes, and ventilators.
Footpath guidepost 53.22235°N 2.96087°W		Late 19th century	The guidepost has a tapering octagonal cast iron shaft, a moulded cap, and a ball finial. The single plate indicates the direction to Welsh Road.
Footpath guidepost 53.21877°N 2.95029°W	—	Late 19th century	The guidepost has a tapering octagonal cast iron shaft, a moulded cap, and a ball finial. The single plate indicates the direction to Mollington.
All Saints Church; 53.2272°N 2.9552°W		1894–96	The church was designed by J. Medland Taylor, but not completed until 1910. It is built in red brick with red tile roofs, and Lakeland slate on the tower. The church consists of a nave, a north aisle, a south porch, a short apsidal chancel, a south vestry, and a tower at the crossing with a broach spire.
