= St Michael's Church, Shotwick =

Coordinates: 53.2388°N 2.9951°W

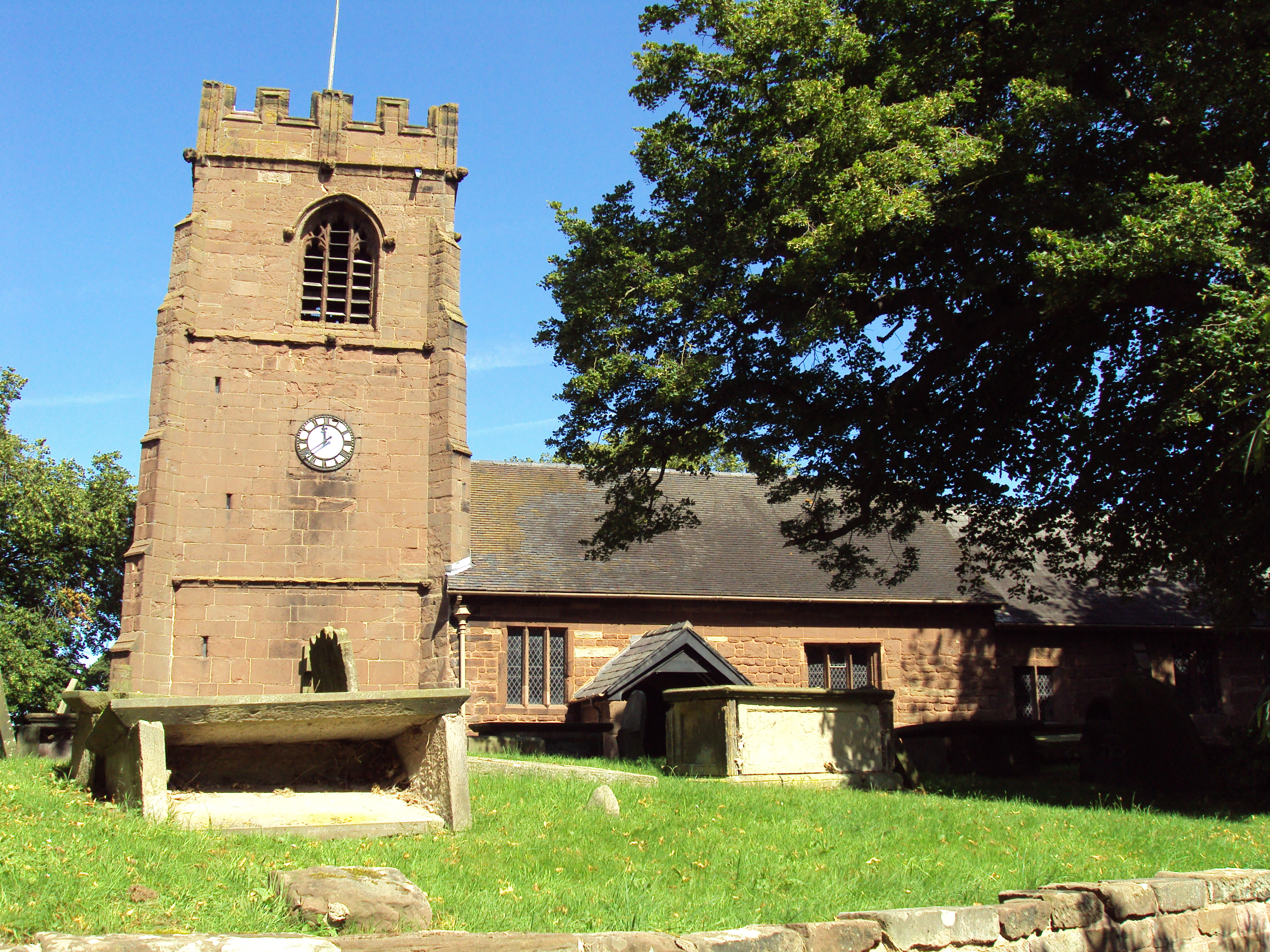
- St Michael's Church seen from south-southeast

- Location in Cheshire
- OS grid reference: SJ336717
- Location: Shotwick, Cheshire
- Country: England
- Denomination: Church of England
- Website: St Michael's Church Shotwick

History
- Status: Parish church
- Dedication: St Michael

Architecture
- Functional status: Active
- Heritage designation: Grade I
- Designated: 1 June 1967
- Architectural type: Church
- Style: Norman, Gothic

Specifications
- Materials: New Red Sandstone; Roof of Welsh slate and tiles

Administration
- Province: York
- Diocese: Chester
- Archdeaconry: Chester
- Deanery: Wirral South
- Parish: Shotwick

Clergy
- Vicar: Cathy Helm

St Michael's Church is the Church of England parish church of Shotwick, Cheshire, England. It a Grade I listed building. It has a Norman doorway but most of the church is Gothic. Its furniture includes some ancient items. In the churchyard are several structures that are Grade II listed. The church is an active parish church in the Diocese of Chester, the archdeaconry of Chester and the deanery of Wirral South. Its benefice is combined with that of St Nicholas, Burton.

== History ==
A church was in existence at the time of the Domesday Book and was largely rebuilt in the 14th century. Restorations were carried out in 1851 and in the 1970s. The parish registers date from 1698.

== Architecture ==
=== Exterior ===
The church is built of New Red Sandstone. The chancel and porch are roofed with Welsh slate and the rest of the roof is covered in purple tiles. The south doorway is Norman, decorated with chevrons but rather obscured by a porch of later date. The porch contains stone benches and on its walls are knife-sharpening slots. The tower is Perpendicular in style, and dates from around 1500. The plan of the church consists of a tower at the west end in line with a nave of four bays and a chancel of three bays. There is a north aisle with a chapel at the west end extending as far as the chancel.

=== Interior ===
All the pews are box pews and are the oldest in Wirral; at one time their doors were fitted with locks and keys. In the north aisle is a canopied churchwardens' pew dated 1709 and a three-decker pulpit. The altar rails date from the late 17th or early 18th century and the lectern from the late 18th century. It has been said that much of this wooden furniture was moved from a church in Chester in 1812. Some of the windows contain 14th-century stained glass. The brass chandelier dates from the late 18th century.

The tower has a ring of six bells. William Clibury of Wellington, Shropshire, cast the tenor bell in 1616 and the fifth bell in 1621. John Taylor & Co of Loughborough cast the other four bells including the treble in 1938.

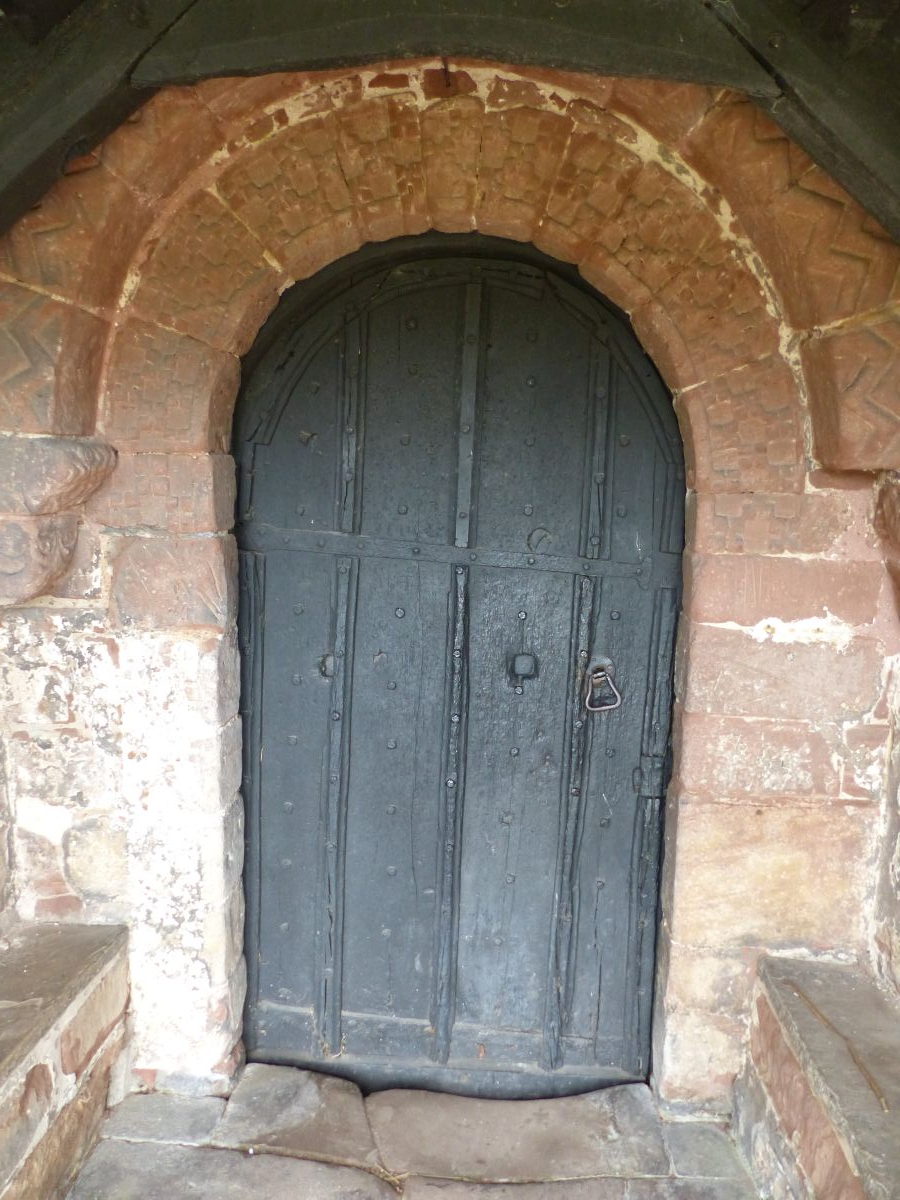
Norman doorway

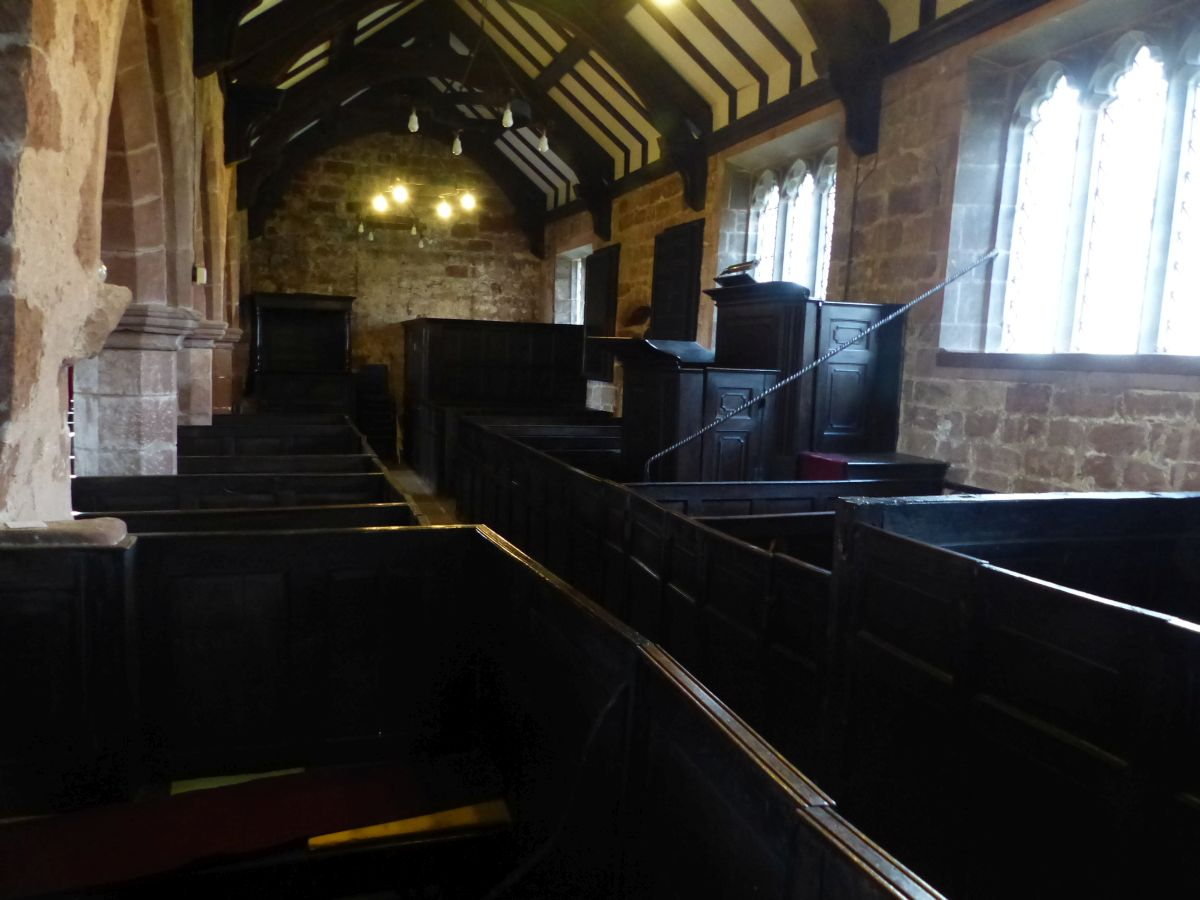
Box pews and churchwarden's pew

== External features ==
In the churchyard the gates, gatepiers and churchyard wall along north side of Shotwick Lane are Grade II listed structures. Also listed Grade II are the red sandstone sundial consisting of a tall bulbous baluster on square base dated 1720, and the tombchests of James Phillips, John Nevett Bennett, Rev M. Reay and four children, Robert and Martha Ellison, William Briscoe (died 1704) and others, and William Briscoe (died 1723) and others. In the northwest part of the churchyard are the war graves of nine Royal Air Force officers of World War I.

== See also ==
- Grade I listed buildings in Cheshire West and Chester
- Grade I listed churches in Cheshire
- Norman architecture in Cheshire
- Listed buildings in Shotwick
