= List of electoral wards in Cheshire =

This is a list of electoral divisions and wards in the ceremonial county of Cheshire in North West England. All changes since the re-organisation of local government following the passing of the Local Government Act 1972 are shown. The number of councillors elected for each electoral division or ward is shown in brackets.

== Unitary authority councils ==
=== Cheshire East ===
Wards from 1 April 2009 (first election 1 May 2008) to 5 May 2011:

1. Alderley (3)
2. Alsager (3)
3. Bollington & Disley (3)
4. Broken Cross (3)
5. Bucklow (3)
6. Cholmondeley (3)
7. Congleton Rural (3)
8. Congleton Town East (3)
9. Congleton Town West (3)
10. Crewe East (3)
11. Crewe North (3)
12. Crewe South (3)
13. Crewe West (3)
14. Doddington (3)
15. Knutsford (3)
16. Macclesfield Forest (3)
17. Macclesfield Town (3)
18. Macclesfield West (3)
19. Middlewich (3)
20. Nantwich (3)
21. Poynton (3)
22. Prestbury & Tytherington (3)
23. Rope (3)
24. Sandbach (3)
25. Sandbach East & Rode (3)
26. Wilmslow North (3)
27. Wilmslow South (3)

Wards from 5 May 2011 to present:

1. Alderley Edge (1)
2. Alsager (3)
3. Audlem (1)
4. Bollington (2)
5. Brereton Rural (1)
6. Broken Cross & Upton (2)
7. Bunbury (1)
8. Chelford (1)
9. Congleton East (3)
10. Congleton West (3)
11. Crewe Central (1)
12. Crewe East (3)
13. Crewe North (1)
14. Crewe South (2)
15. Crewe St Barnabas (1)
16. Crewe West (2)
17. Dane Valley (2)
18. Disley (1)
19. Gawsworth (1)
20. Handforth (2)
21. Haslington (2)
22. High Legh (1)
23. Knutsford (3)
24. Leighton (1)
25. Macclesfield Central (2)
26. Macclesfield East (1)
27. Macclesfield Hurdsfield (1)
28. Macclesfield South (2)
29. Macclesfield Tytherington (2)
30. Macclesfield West & Ivy (2)
31. Middlewich (3)
32. Mobberley (1)
33. Nantwich North & West (2)
34. Nantwich South & Stapeley (2)
35. Odd Rode (2)
36. Poynton East & Pott Shrigley (2)
37. Poynton West & Adlington (2)
38. Prestbury (1)
39. Sandbach Elworth (1)
40. Sandbach Ettiley Heath & Wheelock (1)
41. Sandbach Heath & East (1)
42. Sandbach Town (1)
43. Shavington (1)
44. Sutton (1)
45. Willaston & Rope (1)
46. Wilmslow Dean Row (1)
47. Wilmslow East (1)
48. Wilmslow Lacey Green (1)
49. Wilmslow West & Chorley (2)
50. Wistaston (2)
51. Wrenbury (1)
52. Wybunbury (1)

=== Cheshire West and Chester ===
Wards from 1 April 2009 (first election 1 May 2008) to 5 May 2011:

1. Abbey (3)
2. Blacon (3)
3. Boughton Heath & Vicars Cross (3)
4. Broxton (3)
5. Central & Westminster (3)
6. City (3)
7. Eddisbury (3)
8. Frodsham & Helsby (3)
9. Gowy (3)
10. Grange & Rossmore (3)
11. Groves & Whitby (3)
12. Hoole & Newton (3)
13. Ledsham & Willaston (3)
14. Marbury (3)
15. Mickle Trafford (3)
16. Neston & Parkgate (3)
17. Northwich East & Shakerley (3)
18. Northwich West (3)
19. Overleigh (3)
20. Sutton & Manor (3)
21. Upton (3)
22. Weaver (3)
23. Winsford North & East (3)
24. Winsford South & West (3)

Wards from 5 May 2011 to 2 May 2019:

1. Blacon (3)
2. Boughton (1)
3. Chester City (1)
4. Chester Villages (2)
5. Davenham & Moulton (3)
6. Dodleston & Huntington (1)
7. Ellesmere Port Town (2)
8. Elton (1)
9. Farndon (1)
10. Frodsham (2)
11. Garden Quarter (1)
12. Gowy (1)
13. Grange (1)
14. Great Boughton (2)
15. Handbridge Park (2)
16. Hartford & Greenbank (2)
17. Helsby (1)
18. Hoole (2)
19. Kingsley (1)
20. Lache (1)
21. Ledsham & Manor (2)
22. Little Neston & Burton (2)
23. Malpas (1)
24. Marbury (3)
25. Neston (1)
26. Netherpool (1)
27. Newton (2)
28. Parkgate (1)
29. Rossmore (1)
30. Saughall & Mollington (1)
31. Shakerley (1)
32. St Paul’s (2)
33. Strawberry (1)
34. Sutton (2)
35. Tarporley (1)
36. Tarvin & Kelsall (2)
37. Tattenhall (1)
38. Upton (2)
39. Weaver & Cuddington (3)
40. Whitby (2)
41. Willaston & Thornton (1)
42. Winnington & Castle (2)
43. Winsford Over & Verdin (3)
44. Winsford Swanlow & Dene (2)
45. Winsford Wharton (2)
46. Witton & Rudheath (2)

Wards from 2 May 2019 to present:

1. Blacon (3)
2. Central & Grange (2)
3. Chester City & the Garden Quarter (3)
4. Christleton & Huntington (2)
5. Davenham, Moulton & Kingsmead (2)
6. Farndon (1)
7. Frodsham (2)
8. Gowy Rural (2)
9. Great Boughton (2)
10. Handbridge Park (2)
11. Hartford & Greenbank (2)
12. Helsby (1)
13. Lache (1)
14. Ledsham & Manor (2)
15. Little Neston (1)
16. Malpas (1)
17. Marbury (3)
18. Neston (1)
19. Netherpool (1)
20. Newton & Hoole (3)
21. Northwich Leftwich (1)
22. Northwich Winnington & Castle (2)
23. Northwich Witton (1)
24. Parkgate (1)
25. Rudheath (1)
26. Sandstone (1)
27. Saughall & Mollington (1)
28. Shakerley (1)
29. Strawberry (1)
30. Sutton Villages (2)
31. Tarporley (1)
32. Tarvin & Kelsall (2)
33. Tattenhall (1)
34. Upton (2)
35. Weaver & Cuddington (3)
36. Westminster (1)
37. Whitby Groves (1)
38. Whitby Park (1)
39. Willaston & Thornton (1)
40. Winsford Dene (1)
41. Winsford Gravel (1)
42. Winsford Over & Verdin (3)
43. Winsford Swanlow (1)
44. Winsford Wharton (1)
45. Wolverham (1)

=== Halton ===
Wards from 1 April 1974 (first election 7 June 1973) to 6 May 1976:

1. No. 1 (Farnworth) (3)
2. No. 2 (Appleton) (3)
3. No. 3 (Halton) (3)
4. No. 4 (Kingsway) (3)
5. No. 5 (Victoria) (3)
6. No. 6 (Broadheath) (3)
7. No. 7 (Ditton) (3)
8. No. 8 (Hough Green) (3)
9. No. 9 (Halton Castle) (5)
10. No. 10 (Heath Victoria & Weston) (6)
11. No. 11 (Bridgewater Grange Halton & Mersey) (6)
12. No. 12 (Daresbury) (1)
13. Hale (1)

Wards from 6 May 1976 to 8 May 1986:

1. Appleton (3)
2. Broadheath (3)
3. Castlefields (3)
4. Daresbury (1)
5. Ditton (3)
6. Farnworth (3)
7. Grange (3)
8. Hale (1)
9. Halton (3)
10. Halton Brook (3)
11. Heath (3)
12. Hough Green (3)
13. Kingsway (3)
14. Mersey (3)
15. Norton (3)
16. Victoria (3)
17. Weston (3)

Wards from 8 May 1986 to 1 May 1997:

1. Appleton (3)
2. Broadheath (3)
3. Brookfields (3)
4. Castlefields (3)
5. Clough (3)
6. Daresbury (1)
7. Ditton (3)
8. Farnworth (3)
9. Grange (3)
10. Hale (1)
11. Halton (3)
12. Halton Brook (3)
13. Heath (3)
14. Hough Green (3)
15. Kingsway (3)
16. Mersey (3)
17. Murdishaw (3)
18. Norton (3)
19. Riverside (3)

Wards from 1 May 1997 to 10 June 2004:

1. Appleton (3)
2. Beechwood (2)
3. Birchfield (2)
4. Broadheath (3)
5. Brookvale (2)
6. Castlefields (3)
7. Daresbury (1)
8. Ditton (3)
9. Farnworth (3)
10. Grange (3)
11. Hale (1)
12. Halton (3)
13. Halton Brook (3)
14. Heath (3)
15. Hough Green (3)
16. Kingsway (3)
17. Mersey (3)
18. Murdishaw (3)
19. Norton (3)
20. Palace Fields (3)
21. Riverside (3)

Wards from 10 June 2004 to 6 May 2021:

1. Appleton (3)
2. Beechwood (2)
3. Birchfield (3)
4. Broadheath (3)
5. Castlefields (3); renamed Halton Castle in 2009
6. Daresbury (2)
7. Ditton (3)
8. Farnworth (3)
9. Grange (3)
10. Hale (1)
11. Halton Brook (3)
12. Halton Lea (3)
13. Halton View (3)
14. Heath (3)
15. Hough Green (3)
16. Kingsway (3)
17. Mersey (3)
18. Norton North (3)
19. Norton South (3)
20. Riverside (2)
21. Windmill Hill (1)

Wards from 6 May 2021 to present:

1. Appleton (3)
2. Bankfield (3)
3. Beechwood & Heath (3)
4. Birchfield (3)
5. Bridgewater (3)
6. Central & West Bank (3)
7. Daresbury, Moore & Sandymoor (3)
8. Hale Village & Halebank (3)
9. Farnworth (3)
10. Grange (3)
11. Halton Castle (3)
12. Halton Lea (3)
13. Halton View (3)
14. Highfield (3)
15. Hough Green (3)
16. Mersey & Western (3)
17. Norton North (3)
18. Norton South & Preston Brook (3)

=== Warrington ===
Wards from 1 April 1974 (first election 7 June 1973) to 3 May 1979:

1. No. 1 (Longford) (3)
2. No. 2 (Hulme) (3)
3. No. 6 (Fairfield) (3)
4. No. 7 (Orford) (3)
5. No. 15 (Appleton) (3)
6. No. 17 (Stockton Heath) (3)
7. No. 18 (Walton) (1)
8. No. 21 (Great Sankey) (3)
9. No. 23 (Poulton-with-Fearnhead) (3)
10. No. 24 (Winwick) (2)
11. Bewsey (3)
12. Booths Hill (1)
13. Burtonwood (2)
14. Croft (1)
15. Culcheth & Glazebury (3)
16. Grappenhall & Thelwall (3)
17. Heatley (1)
18. Howley (2)
19. Latchford (3)
20. Lymm (1)
21. Penketh & Cuerdley (3)
22. Rixton & Woolston (3)
23. Statham (1)
24. Westy (3)
25. Whitecross (3)

Wards from 3 May 1979 to 2 May 1991:

1. Appleton and Stretton (3)
2. Bewsey (2)
3. Booths Hill (1)
4. Burtonwood (2)
5. Croft (2)
6. Culcheth and Glazebury (3)
7. Fairfield (3)
8. Grappenhall and Thelwal (3)
9. Great Sankey North (2)
10. Great Sankey South (2)
11. Heatley (1)
12. Howley (2)
13. Hulme (3)
14. Latchford (3)
15. Longford (2)
16. Lymm (1)
17. Orford (3)
18. Penketh and Cuerdley (3)
19. Poulton with Fearnhead North (3)
20. Poulton with Fearnhead South (2)
21. Rixton and Woolston (3)
22. Statham (1)
23. Stockton Heath and Walton (3)
24. Westy (3)
25. Whitecross (2)
26. Winwick (1)

Wards from 2 May 1991 to 1 May 1997:

1. Appleton, Stretton & Hatton (3)
2. Bewsey (2)
3. Burtonwood (3)
4. Culcheth, Glazebury & Croft (3)
5. Fairfield (2)
6. Grappenhall & Thelwall (3)
7. Great Sankey North (3)
8. Great Sankey South (3)
9. Howley & Whitecross (3)
10. Hulme (2)
11. Latchford (3)
12. Locking Stumps, Gorse Covert & Risley (2)
13. Lymm (3)
14. Oakwood (2)
15. Orford (3)
16. Penketh & Cuerdley (3)
17. Poplars (2)
18. Poulton North (3)
19. Poulton South (3)
20. Rixton & Woolston (3)
21. Stockton Heath & Walton (3)
22. Westy (2)
23. Winwick (1)

Wards from 1 May 1997 to 10 June 2004:

1. Appleton (3)
2. Bewsey & Whitecross (3)
3. Birchwood East (2)
4. Birchwood West (2)
5. Burtonwood & Winwick (2)
6. Culcheth, Glazebury & Croft (3)
7. Fairfield & Howley (3)
8. Grappenhall & Thelwall (3)
9. Great Sankey North (2)
10. Great Sankey South (3)
11. Hatton, Stretton & Walton (1)
12. Hulme (2)
13. Latchford (3)
14. Lymm (3)
15. Orford (3)
16. Penketh & Cuerdley (3)
17. Poplars (2)
18. Poulton North (3)
19. Poulton South (3)
20. Rixton & Woolston (3)
21. Stockton Heath (2)
22. Westbrook (2)
23. Westy (2)
24. Whittle Hall (2)

Wards from 10 June 2004 to 5 May 2016:

1. Appleton (3)
2. Bewsey & Whitecross (3)
3. Birchwood (3)
4. Burtonwood & Winwick (2)
5. Culcheth, Glazebury & Croft (3)
6. Fairfield & Howley (3)
7. Grappenhall & Thelwall (3)
8. Great Sankey North (2)
9. Great Sankey South (3)
10. Hatton, Stretton & Walton (1)
11. Latchford East (2)
12. Latchford West (2)
13. Lymm (3)
14. Orford (3)
15. Penketh & Cuerdley (3)
16. Poplars & Hulme (3)
17. Poulton North (3)
18. Poulton South (2)
19. Rixton & Woolston (3)
20. Stockton Heath (2)
21. Westbrook (2)
22. Whittle Hall (3)

Wards from 5 May 2016 to present:

1. Appleton (3)
2. Bewsey & Whitecross (3)
3. Birchwood (3)
4. Burtonwood & Winwick (2)
5. Chapelford & Old Hall (3)
6. Culcheth, Glazebury & Croft (3)
7. Fairfield & Howley (3)
8. Grappenhall (2)
9. Great Sankey North & Whittle Hall (3)
10. Great Sankey South (3)
11. Latchford East (2)
12. Latchford West (2)
13. Lymm North & Thelwall (3)
14. Lymm South (2)
15. Orford (3)
16. Penketh & Cuerdley (3)
17. Poplars & Hulme (3)
18. Poulton North (3)
19. Poulton South (2)
20. Rixton & Woolston (3)
21. Stockton Heath (2)
22. Westbrook (2)

== Former county council ==
=== Cheshire ===
Electoral Divisions from 1 April 1974 (first election 12 April 1973) to 7 May 1981:

1. Alsager Odd Rode (1)
2. Bollington (1)
3. Bucklow Rural (1)
4. Chester No. 1 (2)
5. Chester No. 2 (1)
6. Chester No. 3 (1)
7. Chester No. 4 (1)
8. Chester Rural No. 1 (1)
9. Chester Rural No. 2 (1)
10. Congleton No. 1 (1)
11. Congleton No. 2 (1)
12. Congleton Rural (1)
13. Crewe No. 1 (1)
14. Crewe No. 2 (1)
15. Crewe No. 3 (1)
16. Crewe No. 4 (1)
17. Ellesmere Port No. 1 (1)
18. Ellesmere Port No. 2 (1)
19. Ellesmere Port No. 3 (1)
20. Ellesmere Port No. 4 (1)
21. Golborne (1)
22. Knutsford (1)
23. Lymm (1)
24. Macclesfield No. 1 (1)
25. Macclesfield No. 2 (1)
26. Macclesfield No. 3 (1)
27. Macclesfield Rural No. 1 (1)
28. Macclesfield Rural No. 2 (1)
29. Macclesfield Rural No. 3 (1)
30. Middlewich (1)
31. Nantwich (1)
32. Nantwich Rural No. 1 (1)
33. Nantwich Rural No. 2 (1)
34. Nantwich Rural No. 3 (1)
35. Neston (1)
36. Northwich No. 1 (1)
37. Northwich No. 2 (1)
38. Northwich Rural No. 1 (1)
39. Northwich Rural No. 2 (1)
40. Northwich Rural No. 3 (1)
41. Runcorn No. 1 (1)
42. Runcorn No. 2 (1)
43. Runcorn No. 3 (1)
44. Runcorn Rural No. 1 (1)
45. Runcorn Rural No. 2 (1)
46. Runcorn Rural No. 3 (1)
47. Sandbach (1)
48. Tarvin Rural No. 1 (1)
49. Tarvin Rural No. 2 (1)
50. Warrington No. 1 (2)
51. Warrington No. 2 (1)
52. Warrington No. 3 (1)
53. Warrington No. 4 (1)
54. Warrington Rural No. 1 (1)
55. Warrington Rural No. 2 (1)
56. Warrington Rural No. 3 (1)
57. Warrington Rural No. 4 (1)
58. Widnes No. 1 (1)
59. Widnes No. 2 (1)
60. Widnes No. 3 (1)
61. Widnes No. 4 (1)
62. Wilmslow No. 1 (1)
63. Wilmslow No. 2 (1)
64. Winsford No. 1 (1)
65. Winsford No. 2 (1)

Electoral Divisions from 7 May 1981 to 7 June 2001:

1. Alderley (1)
2. Alsager & Lawton (1)
3. Birchfield (1); electoral division abolished in 1998
4. Birchwood (1); electoral division abolished in 1998
5. Blacon (1)
6. Bollington & Disley (1)
7. Boughton & Vicars Cross (1)
8. Bridgewater (1); electoral division abolished in 1998
9. Brookmere (1)
10. Broxton (1)
11. Bucklow (1)
12. Burtonwood (1); electoral division abolished in 1998
13. Central & Westminster (1)
14. Cholmondeley (1)
15. Congleton & Buglawton (1)
16. Crewe Central (1)
17. Crewe North (1)
18. Crewe South (1)
19. Crewe West (1)
20. Culcheth & Southworth (1); electoral division abolished in 1998
21. Doddington (1)
22. Eddisbury (1)
23. Fairfield & Howley (1); electoral division abolished in 1998
24. Frodsham & Helsby (1)
25. Gowy (1)
26. Grange & Rossmore (1)
27. Great Sankey (1); electoral division abolished in 1998
28. Groves & Whitby (1)
29. Hallwood (1); electoral division abolished in 1998
30. Halton Castle (1); electoral division abolished in 1998
31. High Warren (1); electoral division abolished in 1998
32. Highfield (1); electoral division abolished in 1998
33. Hoole & Plas Newton (1)
34. Hulme (1)
35. Knutsford (1)
36. Latchford & Westy (1); electoral division abolished in 1998
37. Longford & Hulme (1); electoral division abolished in 1998
38. Lymm (1); electoral division abolished in 1998
39. Macclesfield Forest (1)
40. Macclesfield Ivy (1)
41. Macclesfield Victoria (1)
42. Mersey Grange (1); electoral division abolished in 1998
43. Mickle Trafford (1)
44. Middlewich & Brereton (1)
45. Moreton (1)
46. Nantwich (1)
47. Neston & Parkgate (1)
48. North Vale (1)
49. Northwich East (1)
50. Northwich West (1)
51. Oakfield (1); electoral division abolished in 1998
52. Orford & Bewsey (1); electoral division abolished in 1998
53. Overleigh (1)
54. Penketh & Whitecross (1); electoral division abolished in 1998
55. Poulton North (1); electoral division abolished in 1998
56. Poulton South & Woolston (1); electoral division abolished in 1998
57. Poynton (1)
58. Priory Cross (1); electoral division abolished in 1998
59. Rope (1)
60. Sandbach (1)
61. Sealand & College (1)
62. South Wirral (1)
63. Sutton & Rivacre (1)
64. Upton (1)
65. Upton & Prestbury (1)
66. Weston Heath (1); electoral division abolished in 1998
67. Wilmslow Bollin (1)
68. Wilmslow Dean (1)
69. Winsford North (1)
70. Winsford South (1)
71. Woodend (1); electoral division abolished in 1998

Electoral Divisions from 7 June 2001 to 1 April 2009 (county council abolished):

1. Abbey
2. Alderley
3. Alsager
4. Blacon
5. Bollington & Disley
6. Boughton Heath & Vicars Cross
7. Broken Cross
8. Broxton
9. Bucklow
10. Central & Westminster
11. Cholmondeley
12. City
13. Congleton Rural
14. Congleton Town East
15. Congleton Town West
16. Crewe East
17. Crewe North
18. Crewe South
19. Crewe West
20. Doddington
21. Eddisbury
22. Frodsham & Helsby
23. Gowy
24. Grange & Rossmore
25. Groves & Whitby
26. Hoole & Newton
27. Knutsford
28. Ledsham & Willaston
29. Macclesfield Forest
30. Macclesfield Town
31. Macclesfield West
32. Marbury
33. Mickle Trafford
34. Middlewich
35. Nantwich
36. Neston & Parkgate
37. Northwich East & Shakerley
38. Northwich West
39. Overleigh
40. Poynton
41. Prestbury & Tytherington
42. Rope
43. Sandbach
44. Sandbach East & Rode
45. Sutton & Manor
46. Upton
47. Weaver
48. Wilmslow North
49. Wilmslow South
50. Winsford North & East
51. Winsford South & West

== Former district councils ==
=== Chester ===
Wards from 1 April 1974 (first election 7 June 1973) to 3 May 1979:

1. No. 1 (Chester: Boughton) (3)
2. No. 2 (Chester: Hoole) (3)
3. No. 3 (Chester: Newton) (6)
4. No. 4 (Chester: St Johns) (3)
5. No. 5 (Chester: St Marys) (5)
6. No. 6 (Chester: St Oswalds) (2)
7. No. 7 (Chester: Trinity) (11)
8. No. 8 (Dodleston) (1)
9. No. 9 (Great Boughton North) (3)
10. No. 10 (Boughton Heath) (2)
11. No. 11 (Christleton) (2)
12. No. 12 (Hoole) (1)
13. No. 13 (Elton) (1)
14. No. 14 (Mollington) (1)
15. No. 15 (Saughall) (2)
16. No. 16 (Upton) (5)
17. No. 17 (Tarvin) (4)
18. No. 18 (Farndon & Tattenhall) (4)
19. No. 19 (Malpas) (3)

Wards from 3 May 1979 to 6 May 1999:

1. Barrow (2)
2. Blacon Hall (3)
3. Boughton (2)
4. Boughton Heath (2)
5. Christleton (2)
6. College (3)
7. Curzon (2)
8. Dee Point (3)
9. Dodleston (1)
10. Elton (2)
11. Farndon (1)
12. Grosvenor (3)
13. Hoole (3)
14. Malpas (2)
15. Mollington (1)
16. Newton (3)
17. Plas Newton (3)
18. Saughall (2)
19. Sealand (3)
20. Tarvin (2)
21. Tattenhall (2)
22. Tilston (1)
23. Upton Grange (2)
24. Upton Heath (3)
25. Vicars Cross (3)
26. Waverton (1)
27. Westminster (3)

Wards from 6 May 1999 to 1 April 2009 (district abolished):

1. Barrow (1)
2. Blacon Hall (3)
3. Blacon Lodge (3)
4. Boughton (2)
5. Boughton Heath (2)
6. Christleton (2)
7. City & St Anne's (2)
8. College (3)
9. Curzon & Westminster (2)
10. Dodleston (1)
11. Elton (2)
12. Farndon (1)
13. Handbridge & St Mary's (2)
14. Hoole All Saints (2)
15. Hoole Groves (2)
16. Huntington (1)
17. Kelsall (2)
18. Lache Park (3)
19. Malpas (2)
20. Mickle Trafford (1)
21. Mollington (1)
22. Newton Brook (2)
23. Newton St Michaels (2)
24. Saughall (2)
25. Tarvin (2)
26. Tattenhall (2)
27. Tilston (1)
28. Upton Grange (3)
29. Upton Westlea (2)
30. Vicars Cross (3)
31. Waverton (1)

=== Congleton ===
Wards from 1 April 1974 (first election 7 June 1973) to 6 May 1976:

1. No. 1 (Alsager East) (1)
2. No. 2 (Alsager North) (2)
3. No. 3 (Alsager South) (2)
4. No. 4 (Alsager West) (1)
5. No. 5 (Buglawton) (2)
6. No. 6 (Congleton North) (3)
7. No. 7 (Congleton South) (3)
8. No. 8 (Congleton West) (5)
9. No. 11 (Twemlow) (2)
10. No. 15 (Somerford) (1)
11. No. 16 (Kinderton) (1)
12. No. 17 (Middlewich Newton) (1)
13. No. 18 (Middlewich Sutton) (1)
14. No. 19 (Middlewich Cledford) (2)
15. Astbury (1)
16. Brereton (1)
17. Holmes Chapel (2)
18. Lawton (2)
19. Odd Rode (3)
20. Sandbach East (3)
21. Sandbach North (3)
22. Sandbach West (3)

Wards from 6 May 1976 to 6 May 1999:

1. Alsager East (3)
2. Alsager West (3)
3. Astbury (1)
4. Brereton (1)
5. Buglawton (2)
6. Congleton Central (2)
7. Congleton North (3)
8. Congleton South (3)
9. Congleton West (3)
10. Dane (3)
11. Holmes Chapel (2)
12. Lawton (2)
13. Middlewich Cledford (2)
14. Middlewich Kinderton (3)
15. Odd Rode (3)
16. Sandbach East (3)
17. Sandbach North (3)
18. Sandbach West (3)

Wards from 6 May 1999 to 1 April 2009 (district abolished):

1. Alsager Central (2)
2. Alsager East (3)
3. Alsager West (2)
4. Astbury (1)
5. Brereton (1)
6. Buglawton (2)
7. Congleton Central (2)
8. Congleton North (2)
9. Congleton North West (2)
10. Congleton South (3)
11. Congleton West (3)
12. Dane Valley (2)
13. Holmes Chapel (3)
14. Lawton (2)
15. Middlewich Cledford (3)
16. Middlewich Kinderton (3)
17. Odd Rode (3)
18. Sandbach East (3)
19. Sandbach North (3)
20. Sandbach West (3)

=== Crewe and Nantwich ===
Wards from 1 April 1974 (first election 7 June 1973) to 3 May 1979:

1. No. 1 (Crewe: Central & West Central) (6)
2. No. 2 (Crewe: West) (4)
3. No. 3 (Crewe: South West) (5)
4. No. 4 (Crewe: North West) (4)
5. No. 5 (Crewe: North East) (6)
6. No. 6 (Crewe: South) (4)
7. No. 7 (Crewe: South East) (3)
8. No. 14 (Newhall) (1)
9. No. 15 (Austerson) (1)
10. No. 17 (Minshull) (1)
11. No. 19 (Wybunbury) (1)
12. No. 20 (Weston) (1)
13. No. 21 (Basford) (1)
14. No. 22 (Haslington) (3)
15. No. 23 (Shavington) (2)
16. No. 24 (Wistaston) (3)
17. Acton (1)
18. Audlem (1)
19. Barony Weaver (3)
20. Bunbury (1)
21. Peckforton (1)
22. Wellington (2)
23. Willaston East (2)
24. Willaston West (2)
25. Wrenbury (1)

Wards from 3 May 1979 to 6 May 1999:

1. Acton (1)
2. Alexandria (3)
3. Audlem (1)
4. Barony Weaver (3)
5. Bunbury (1)
6. Combermere (1)
7. Coppenhall (3)
8. Delamere (3)
9. Grosvenor (3)
10. Haslington (3)
11. Maw Green (3)
12. Minshull (1)
13. Peckforton (1)
14. Queens Park (3)
15. Ruskin Park (3)
16. St Barnabas (3)
17. St Johns (3)
18. Shavington (3)
19. Waldron (3)
20. Wellington (2)
21. Weston Park (1)
22. Willaston East (1)
23. Willaston West (2)
24. Wistaston (3)
25. Wrenbury (1)
26. Wybunbury (2)

Wards from 6 May 1999 to 1 April 2009 (district abolished):

1. Acton (1)
2. Alexandra (3)
3. Audlem (2)
4. Barony Weaver (3)
5. Birchin (2)
6. Bunbury (1)
7. Coppenhall (2)
8. Delamere (2)
9. Englesea (1)
10. Grosvenor (2)
11. Haslington (3)
12. Leighton (3)
13. Maw Green (3)
14. Minshull (1)
15. Peckforton (1)
16. St Barnabas (3)
17. St John's (3)
18. St Mary's (2)
19. Shavington (2)
20. Valley (2)
21. Waldron (3)
22. Wellington (2)
23. Wells Green (2)
24. Willaston (1)
25. Wistaston Green (3)
26. Wrenbury (1)
27. Wybunbury (2)

=== Ellesmere Port and Neston ===
Wards from 1 April 1974 (first election 7 June 1973) to 6 May 1976:

1. Burton & Ness (1)
2. Central (4)
3. Leighton & Parkgate (2)
4. Little Neston (2)
5. Neston East (2)
6. Neston West (1)
7. Pooltown (4)
8. Rivacre (4)
9. Riverside (1)
10. Stanlow (4)
11. Sutton (4)
12. Thornton (4)
13. Westminster (4)
14. Whitby (4)
15. Willaston (1)

Wards from 6 May 1976 to 6 May 1999:

1. Burton and Ness (1)
2. Central (3)
3. Grange (3)
4. Groves (2)
5. Ledsham (3)
6. Little Neston (2)
7. Neston (2)
8. Parkgate (2)
9. Pooltown (2)
10. Rivacre (3)
11. Riverside (1)
12. Rosssmore (3)
13. Stanlow (2)
14. Sutton (3)
15. Westminster (2)
16. Whitby (3)
17. Willaston and Thornton (2)
18. Wolverham (2)

Wards from 6 May 1999 to 1 April 2009 (district abolished):

1. Burton & Ness (1)
2. Central (2)
3. Grange (3)
4. Groves (2)
5. Ledsham (3)
6. Little Neston (2)
7. Neston (2)
8. Parkgate (2)
9. Pooltown (2)
10. Rivacre (2)
11. Riverside (2)
12. Rossmore (3)
13. Stanlow & Wolverham (3)
14. Strawberry Fields (2)
15. Sutton (3)
16. Sutton Green & Manor (2)
17. Westminster (2)
18. Whitby (3)
19. Willaston & Thornton (2)

=== Macclesfield ===
Wards from 1 April 1974 (first election 7 June 1973) to 3 May 1979:

1. No. 1 (Alderley Edge) (2)
2. No. 5 (Mobberley) (2)
3. No. 8 (Plumley) (1)
4. No. 15 (Macclesfield North West) (3)
5. No. 16 (Macclesfield Central) (3)
6. No. 17 (Macclesfield West) (3)
7. No. 22 (Sutton) (2)
8. No. 23 (Gawsworth) (1)
9. No. 29 (Wilmslow: Dean Row) (3)
10. Bollington Central (1)
11. Bollington East (1)
12. Bollington West (1)
13. Disley (2)
14. Fulshaw (2)
15. Handforth (3)
16. Henbury (1)
17. High Legh (1)
18. Hough (3)
19. Knutsford Nether (1)
20. Knutsford Over (2)
21. Knutsford South (2)
22. Knutsford West (1)
23. Macclesfield East (3)
24. Macclesfield North East (3)
25. Macclesfield South (3)
26. Mere (1)
27. Morley & Styal (3)
28. Nether Alderley (1)
29. Poynton Central (2)
30. Poynton East (1)
31. Poynton West (2)
32. Prestbury (2)
33. Rainow (1)

Wards from 3 May 1979 to 6 May 1999:

1. Alderley Edge (2)
2. Bollington Central (1)
3. Bollington East (1)
4. Bollington West (1)
5. Dean Row (2)
6. Disley (2)
7. Fulshaw (2)
8. Gawsworth (1)
9. Handforth (3)
10. Henbury (1)
11. High Legh (1)
12. Hough (2)
13. Knutsford Nether (1)
14. Knutsford Over (2)
15. Knutsford South (2)
16. Knutsford West (1)
17. Lacey Green (2)
18. Macclesfield Central (3)
19. Macclesfield East (3)
20. Macclesfield North East (3)
21. Macclesfield North West (3)
22. Macclesfield South (3)
23. Macclesfield West (3)
24. Mere (1)
25. Mobberley (1)
26. Morley and Styal (2)
27. Nether Alderley (1)
28. Plumley (1)
29. Poynton Central (2)
30. Poynton East (1)
31. Poynton West (2)
32. Prestbury (2)
33. Rainow (1)
34. Sutton (1)

Wards from 6 May 1999 to 1 April 2009 (district abolished):

1. Alderley Edge (2)
2. Bollington Central (1)
3. Bollington East (1)
4. Bollington West (1)
5. Chelford (1)
6. Dean Row (2)
7. Disley & Lyme Handley (2)
8. Fulshaw (2)
9. Gawsworth (1)
10. Handforth (3)
11. Henbury (1)
12. High Legh (1)
13. Hough (2)
14. Knutsford Bexton (1)
15. Knutsford Nether (1)
16. Knutsford Norbury Booths (1)
17. Knutsford Over (2)
18. Lacey Green (1)
19. Macclesfield Bollinbrook (2)
20. Macclesfield Broken Cross (2)
21. Macclesfield Central (2)
22. Macclesfield East (2)
23. Macclesfield Hurdsfield (2)
24. Macclesfield Ivy (2)
25. Macclesfield Ryles (1)
26. Macclesfield South (2)
27. Macclesfield Tytherington (2)
28. Macclesfield West (2)
29. Mere (1)
30. Mobberley (1)
31. Morley & Styal (2)
32. Plumley (1)
33. Poynton Central (3)
34. Poynton East (1)
35. Poynton West (2)
36. Prestbury (2)
37. Rainow (1)
38. Sutton (1)

=== Vale Royal ===
Wards from 1 April 1974 (first election 7 June 1973) to 6 May 1976:

1. No. 4 (Northwich: Witton) (4)
2. No. 5 (Winsford: Over) (4)
3. No. 6 (Winsford: Swanlow & Vale Royal) (4)
4. No. 7 (Winsford: Gravel & Wharton) (4)
5. No. 8 (Cuddington) (3)
6. No. 19 (Weaverham) (4)
7. No. 25 (Frodsham) (4)
8. Barnton (3)
9. Castle (3)
10. Cogshall (1)
11. Davenham & Moulton (3)
12. Forest (1)
13. Hartford (2)
14. Helsby Central (1)
15. Helsby North (1)
16. Helsby South & Alvanley (1)
17. Kingsley (1)
18. Lostock Gralam (1)
19. Mara (1)
20. Marston & Wincham (1)
21. Northwich (2)
22. Oulton (1)
23. Rudheath & Whatcroft (2)
24. Sevenoaks (1)
25. Shakerley (1)
26. Tarporley (1)
27. Weaver (1)
28. Winnington (1)

Wards from 6 May 1976 to 6 May 1999:

1. Barnton (3)
2. Castle (3)
3. Church (1)
4. Cogshall (1)
5. Cuddington and Marton (3)
6. Davenham and Moulton (3)
7. Forest (1)
8. Frodsham East (2)
9. Frodsham North West (2)
10. Frodsham South (1)
11. Gorst Wood (3)
12. Gravel (2)
13. Hartford (2)
14. Helsby Central (1)
15. Helsby North (1)
16. Helsby South and Alvanley (1)
17. Kingsley (1)
18. Lostock Gralam (1)
19. Mara (1)
20. Marston and Wincham (1)
21. Milton (1)
22. Northwich (2)
23. Oulton (1)
24. Over One (2)
25. Over Two (2)
26. Rudheath and Whatcroft (2)
27. Seven Oaks (1)
28. Shakerley (1)
29. Swanlow (2)
30. Tarporley (1)
31. Vale Royal (3)
32. Weaver (1)
33. Wharton (2)
34. Winnington (1)
35. Witton North (2)
36. Witton South (2)

Wards from 6 May 1999 to 1 April 2009 (district abolished):

1. Barnton (3)
2. Cogshall (1)
3. Cuddington & Oakmere (3)
4. Davenham & Moulton (3)
5. Forest (1)
6. Frodsham North (3)
7. Frodsham South (1)
8. Hartford & Whitegate (3)
9. Helsby (2)
10. Kingsley (1)
11. Leftwich & Kingsmead (3)
12. Lostock & Wincham (2)
13. Mara (1)
14. Milton Weaver (1)
15. Northwich Castle (3)
16. Northwich Winnington (1)
17. Northwich Witton (3)
18. Rudheath & South Witton (2)
19. Seven Oaks & Marston (1)
20. Shakerley (1)
21. Tarporley & Oulton (2)
22. Weaverham (3)
23. Winsford Dene (2)
24. Winsford Gravel (2)
25. Winsford Over (2)
26. Winsford Swanlow (2)
27. Winsford Verdin (3)
28. Winsford Wharton (2)

== Electoral wards by constituency ==
Wards as they existed on 1 December 2020.

=== Chester North and Neston ===
Cheshire West and Chester: Blacon; Chester City & the Garden Quarter; Great Boughton; Little Neston; Neston; Newton & Hoole; Parkgate; Saughall & Mollington; Upton; Willaston & Thornton.

=== Chester South and Eddisbury ===
Cheshire East: Audlem; Bunbury; Wrenbury; Wybunbury.

Cheshire West and Chester: Christleton & Huntington; Farndon; Handbridge Park; Lache; Malpas; Tarporley; Tarvin & Kelsall; Tattenhall; Weaver & Cuddington.

=== Congleton ===
Cheshire East: Alsager; Brereton Rural; Congleton East; Congleton West; Dane Valley; Odd Rode; Sandbach Elworth; Sandbach Ettiley Heath & Wheelock; Sandbach Heath & East; Sandbach Town.

=== Crewe and Nantwich ===
Cheshire East: Crewe Central; Crewe East; Crewe North; Crewe South; Crewe St. Barnabas; Crewe West; Haslington; Leighton; Nantwich North & West; Nantwich South & Stapeley; Shavington; Willaston & Rope; Wistaston.

=== Ellesmere Port and Bromborough (part) ===
Cheshire West and Chester: Central & Grange; Ledsham & Manor; Netherpool; Strawberry; Sutton Villages; Westminster; Whitby Groves; Whitby Park; Wolverham.

=== Macclesfield ===
Cheshire East: Bollington; Broken Cross & Upton; Disley; Gawsworth; Macclesfield Central; Macclesfield East; Macclesfield Hurdsfield; Macclesfield South; Macclesfield Tytherington; Macclesfield West & Ivy; Poynton East & Pott Shrigley; Poynton West & Adlington; Prestbury; Sutton.

=== Mid Cheshire ===
Cheshire East: Middlewich.

Cheshire West and Chester: Davenham, Moulton & Kingsmead; Hartford & Greenback; Northwich Leftwich; Northwich Winnington & Castle; Northwich Witton; Rudheath; Winsford Dene; Winsford Gravel; Winsford Over & Verdin; Winsford Swanlow; Winsford Wharton.

=== Runcorn and Helsby ===
Cheshire West and Chester: Frodsham; Gowy Rural; Helsby; Sandstone.

Halton: Beechwood & Heath; Bridgewater; Daresbury, Moore & Sandymoor; Grange; Halton Castle; Halton Lea; Mersey & Weston; Norton North; Norton South & Preston Brook.

=== Tatton ===
Cheshire East: Alderley Edge; Chelford; Handforth; High Legh; Knutsford; Mobberley; Wilmslow Dean Row; Wilmslow East; Wilmslow Lacey Green; Wilmslow West & Chorley.

Cheshire West and Chester: Marbury; Shakerley.

Warrington: Lymm North & Thelwall (polling districts SNA, SNB, SPA, SPB & SPC); Lymm South.

=== Warrington North ===
Warrington: Birchwood; Burtonwood & Winwick; Culcheth, Glazebury & Croft; Fairfield & Howley; Orford; Poplars & Hulme; Poulton North; Poulton South; Rixton & Woolston; Westbrook.

=== Warrington South ===
Warrington Appleton; Bewsey and Whitecross; Chapelford & Old Hall; Grappenhall; Great Sankey North & Whittle Hall; Great Sankey South; Latchford East; Latchford West; Lymm North & Thelwall (polling districts SNC, SND, SNE & SNF); Penketh & Cuerdley; Stockton Heath.

=== Widnes and Halewood (part) ===
Halton: Appleton; Bankfield; Birchfield; Central & West Bank; Ditton, Hale Village & Halebank; Farnworth; Halton View; Highfield; Hough Green.

== See also ==
- List of parliamentary constituencies in Cheshire
