= Saughall =

Village in Cheshire, England

Coordinates: 53°13′24″N 2°57′33″W

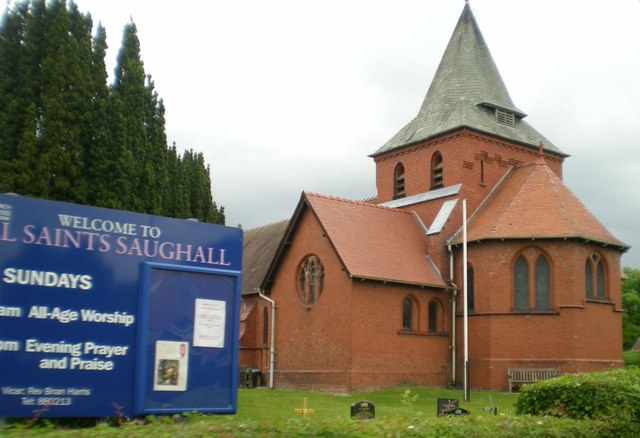
- All Saints Church

- Location within Cheshire
- Population: 3,009 (2011 census)
- OS grid reference: SJ360700
- Civil parish: Saughall & Shotwick Park / Puddington / Chester (unparished area)
- Unitary authority: Cheshire West and Chester
- Ceremonial county: Cheshire
- Region: North West
- Country: England
- Sovereign state: United Kingdom
- Post town: CHESTER
- Postcode district: CH1
- Dialling code: 01244
- Police: Cheshire
- Fire: Cheshire
- Ambulance: North West
- UK Parliament: Chester North and Neston

Saughall is a village in the civil parish of Saughall and Shotwick Park, in the unitary authority area of Cheshire West and Chester and the ceremonial county of Cheshire, England. Located between Shotwick and Blacon, it is approximately 3 miles (4.8 km) north west of Chester and 1 mile (1.6 km) from Sealand across the Welsh border.

At the 2001 census, there were 3,084 residents in the village reducing to 3,009 at the 2011 census. A total of 3,585 people living in the ward of Saughall, with 48.5% male and 51.5% female. This electoral ward was called Saughall and Mollington at the 2011 census. The total ward population at this census was 4,463.

== Toponymy ==
The name Saughall is Anglo-Saxon in origin, meaning "willow nook" or "corner where willows grow".

== History ==
The Domesday Book of 1086 mentions the village as Salhale. Most of the land is recorded as in the possession of a Norman baron, William Malbank (or Malbanc). The remainder was held by St Werburgh Abbey in Chester.

Saughall was a fishing village until it was cut off from the sea by land reclamation in the Dee estuary. The river had flowed to the sea along the current border between Wales and England, until in the 18th century, when it was diverted into its present channelised course to try to improve ship access from the sea to Chester.

The village previously consisted of two townships in the parish of Shotwick, Wirral Hundred. Great Saughall had a population of 147 in 1801, 493 in 1851 and 703 in 1901. Little Saughall had a population of 48 in 1801, 69 in 1851 and 137 in 1901. The civil parish of Saughall was created on 1 April 1948 by uniting both settlements, with a combined population of 1,518 in 1951. The civil parish was abolished on 1 April 2015 to form Saughall and Shotwick Park, with parts also incorporated into the parish of Puddington and the unparished area of Chester.

Between 31 March 1890 and 1 February 1954, Saughall railway station on the Chester & Connah's Quay Railway served the village. The station has been demolished, and the trackbed is now a cycleway.

== Community ==
The village had two local schools: The Ridings Community Infant School and Thomas Wedge Church of England Junior School. The latter, originally known as Great Saughall School, was built and endowed by Thomas Wedge of Sealand, Flintshire, at his own expense in 1852 as a gift to the people of Saughall and Sealand. In late 2006, Cheshire County Council agreed to embark on a process that would ultimately lead to the merger of the two schools. In March 2008, the plans were submitted and included building an entirely new united primary school on the school field behind the current Thomas Wedge building. This was completed in 2010; the old schools have been demolished and replaced with Saughall All Saints Primary School.

Saughall Windmill is more commonly known as Gibbet Mill and is now a private residence. Some distance outside the village, its name likely dates from the 18th century. It was the location of the murder of a farm labourer by two fellow workers after a disagreement over earnings near the mill. After their trial and execution, their bodies were hung in chains, or "gibbeted" from a nearby ash tree, as a warning to other criminals.

== See also ==
- Listed buildings in Saughall
- Saughall Massie, a village in the Metropolitan Borough of Wirral, Merseyside
- All Saints Church, Great Saughall
