= Shotwick =

Village in Cheshire, England

Coordinates: 53.239°N 2.994°W

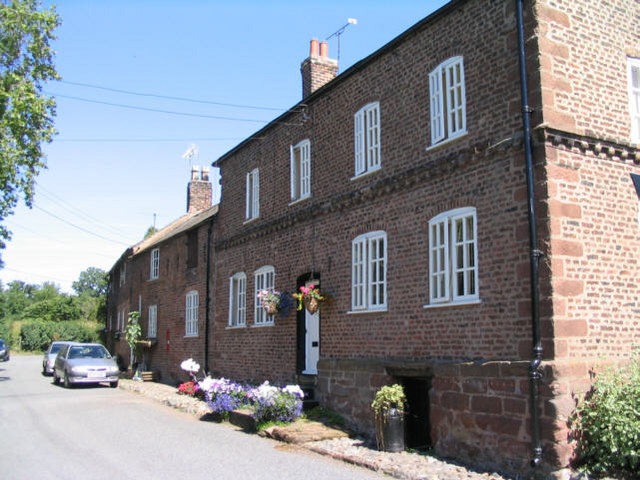
- Houses in Shotwick village

- Location within Cheshire
- Population: 58 (2001 census)
- OS grid reference: SJ337718
- Civil parish: Puddington
- Unitary authority: Cheshire West and Chester
- Ceremonial county: Cheshire
- Region: North West
- Country: England
- Sovereign state: United Kingdom
- Post town: CHESTER
- Postcode district: CH1
- Dialling code: 01244
- Police: Cheshire
- Fire: Cheshire
- Ambulance: North West
- UK Parliament: Chester North and Neston

Shotwick is a small village and former civil parish, now in the parish of Puddington, on the southern end of the Wirral Peninsula in the unitary authority of Cheshire West and Chester and the ceremonial county of Cheshire, England. The village is close to the county of Flintshire on the England–Wales border. The village was located on the River Dee until it was canalised in 1736 after which the reclaimed land has since developed into the neighbouring Deeside Industrial Park.

== History ==
Shotwick is recorded in the Domesday book (1086), within the Cheshire Hundred of Willaston, with six households listed. Shotwick Castle was built about 1093 by Hugh Lupus, 1st Earl of Chester, at what is now Shotwick Park and near the River Dee, before the area succumbed to the effects of silting. The Norman castle lay in ruins by the 17th century and now only the foundations remain. Henry II left from Shotwick for Ireland and Edward I used the port to leave for Wales in 1278.

The village, including part of the hamlet of Two Mills was within the Wirral Hundred, with a population of 95 in 1801, 100 in 1851, 82 in 1901, 70 in 1951 and 58 in 2001. It currently has a population of 120. The civil parish was abolished on 1 April 2015 and merged into Puddington.

== Gallery ==
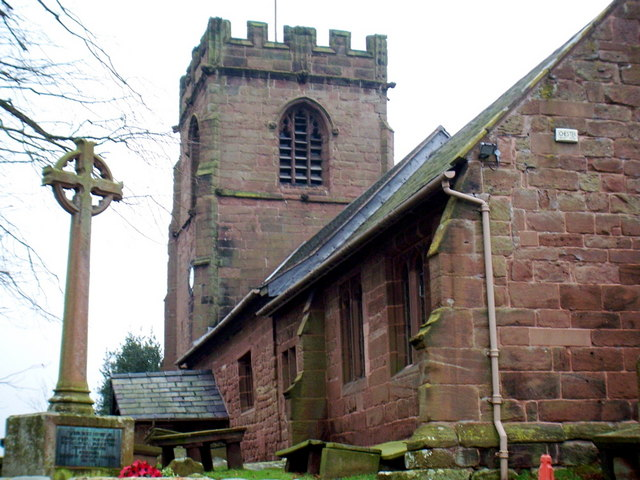
St. Michael's church, Shotwick

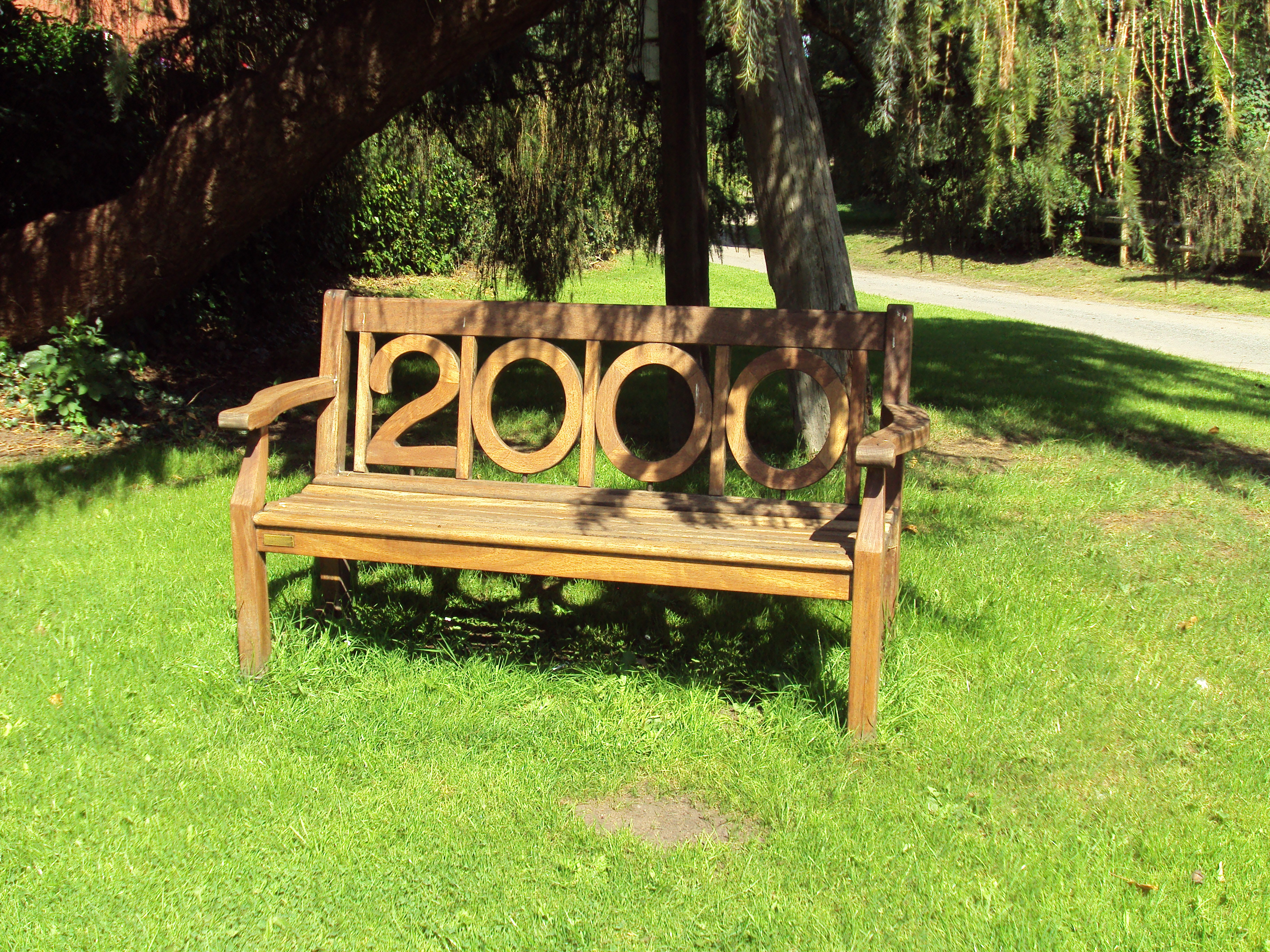
Millennium bench

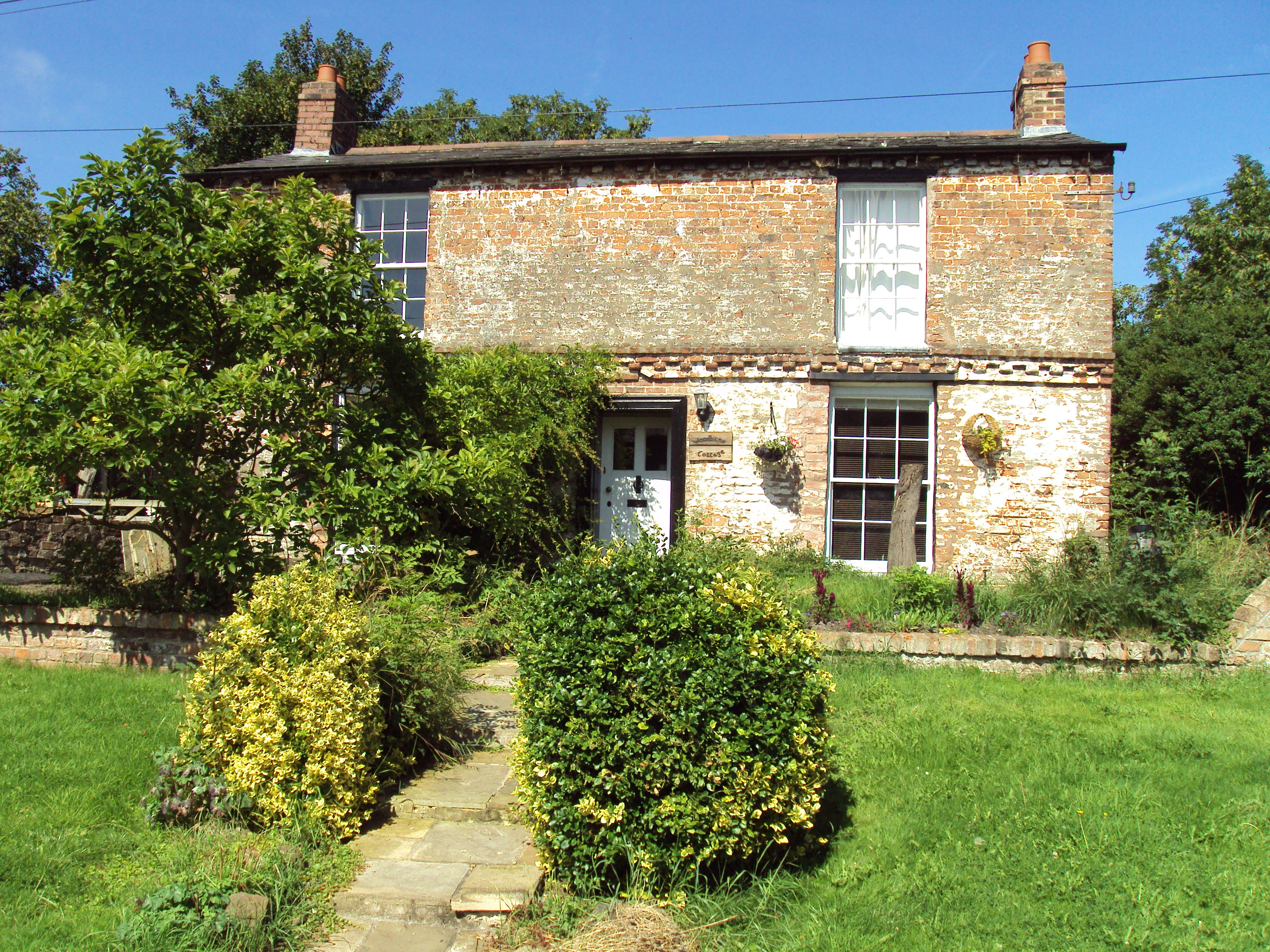
Cottage in Shotwick

== See also ==
- Listed buildings in Shotwick
- St Michael's Church, Shotwick
- Shotwick Hall
