= Listed buildings in Puddington, Cheshire =

Puddington is a civil parish in Cheshire West and Chester, England. It contains 12 buildings that are recorded in the National Heritage List for England as designated listed buildings. Of these, one is listed at Grade II*, the middle grade, and the others are at Grade II. Apart from the village of Puddington, the parish is entirely rural. Nine of the listed buildings are houses, or structures related to houses or farming, the other three being footpath guideposts. All of these were erected by the Wirral Footpaths Preservation Society towards the end of the 19th century, or at the beginning of the 20th century. They all bear an inscription on the shaft.

== Key ==
Grade	Criteria
II*	Particularly important buildings of more than special interest.
II	Buildings of national importance and special interest.

== Buildings ==
Name and location	Photograph	Date	Notes	Grade
Puddington Old Hall; 53.2525°N 3.0114°W	—	15th century	The hall originated as a timber-framed building with a quadrilateral plan around a courtyard on a moated site. During the Popish Plot it housed Catholics. The house was re-walled in the 18th century, and alterations were made in 1909. It has been converted into two houses and a flat. The building retains three sides around a courtyard, and is in two storeys, with a Welsh slate roof. The windows are casements.	II*
Farm buildings, Puddington Old Hall; 53.2531°N 3.0114°W		Late 17th century	A group of farm buildings surrounding a courtyard. They are in brick with some sandstone, and have Welsh slate roofs. The buildings consist of three two-storey buildings on the north, west and south sides. In the southeast corner is a former one-storey carthouse. Features include square pitch holes and ventilation slots.	II
The White House; 53.2536°N 3.0087°W		1710	The house originated as a farmhouse. It is built in rendered brick on a sandstone plinth and has Welsh slate roof. The house has two storeys and a three-bay front. The windows are casements. On the front is a square stone inscribed with initials and the date. In the roof is a dormer.	II
Hawthorn Dene and Lilac Cottage; 53.2534°N 3.0104°W		Early 18th century	Originating as a farmhouse, it has been altered and extended to create two houses. It is constructed in brick with Welsh slate roofs. The building has a double-pile plan, is in three storeys with a two-storey extension, and has an almost symmetrical three-bay front. The windows are casements. Above the central doorway is a fanlight.	II
Outbuilding, Puddington Old Hall; 53.25258°N 3.01197°W	—	18th century	Originating as a stable and dovecote, it has subsequently been altered. It is built in sandstone with some brick, and has a Welsh slate roof. The building has a rectangular plan, is in one and two storeys, and has a three-bay east front. Features include a nine-pane window, pitch holes and ventilation slots. Inside are two tiers of nest boxes on brick ledges.	II
The Orchards; 53.2535°N 3.0140°W	—	c. 1760	This was originally the service wing of Puddington Hall. An addition at the west contained a Catholic chapel. It has since been divided into separate units for domestic use. The building is in red brick on a stone plinth, with sandstone dressings and a Welsh slate roof. It is a long building in eight bays and has two storeys. The windows are sashes. A flight of external steps lead up to the previous chapel.	II
Farm buildings, The Orchards; 53.2532°N 3.0133°W	—	c. 1760	Two ranges of buildings on each side of a courtyard, the west of which was originally a wing of Puddington Hall. They are in brick on sandstone plinths, and have hipped Welsh slate roofs. Both ranges are in two storeys, the west range being symmetrical, with eight bays, and the east range with five bays. Features include sash windows and circular pitch holes.	II
Dovecote, Puddington Old Hall; 53.25315°N 3.01118°W	—	Late 18th century	The dovecote is built in brick with a pyramidal roof of Welsh slate. In the roof is a weatherboarded raised entrance. The building has a square plan, is in two storeys, and has a one-bay front. Inside are tiers of nest boxes on brick ledges.	II
Puddington Hall; 53.2520°N 3.0061°W	—	1872–74	The previous hall was burnt in 1867, leaving only two wings. The hall was rebuilt on a different site and an extension, known as the West Hall, was added in about 1904. The building has since been divided into two dwellings. The older part is in sandstone, and West Hall is partly timber-framed, and partly pebbledashed. The roofs are slated.	II
Footpath guidepost 53.25307°N 3.00410°W	—	Late 19th century	A cast iron guidepost with an octagonal shaft on a plinth. The cap is moulded and carries a ball finial. The fingerpost indicates the direction to Shotwick. The inscription on the shaft reads: "WIRRAL FOOTPATHS ETC. PRESERVATION SOCIETY BY PERMISSION OF THE COUNCIL".	II
Footpath guidepost 53.25390°N 3.00863°W		Late 19th century	A cast iron guidepost with an octagonal shaft on a plinth. The cap is moulded and carries a ball finial. The fingerpost indicates the direction to Chester. The inscription on the shaft reads: "WIRRAL FOOTPATHS ETC. PRESERVATION SOCIETY BY PERMISSION OF THE COUNCIL".	II
Footpath guidepost 53.25811°N 2.97571°W	—	Late 19th to early 20th century	A cast iron guidepost with an octagonal shaft on a plinth. The cap is moulded and carries a ball finial. The fingerpost indicates the direction to Welsh Road. The inscription on the shaft reads: "ERECTED BY THE WIRRALL FOOTPATHS SOCIETY BY CONSENT OF THE COUNTY COUNCIL PLEASE KEEP TO THE FOOTPATH".	II
