= Puddington, Cheshire =

Village in Cheshire, England

Coordinates: 53.253°N 3.008°W

Puddington
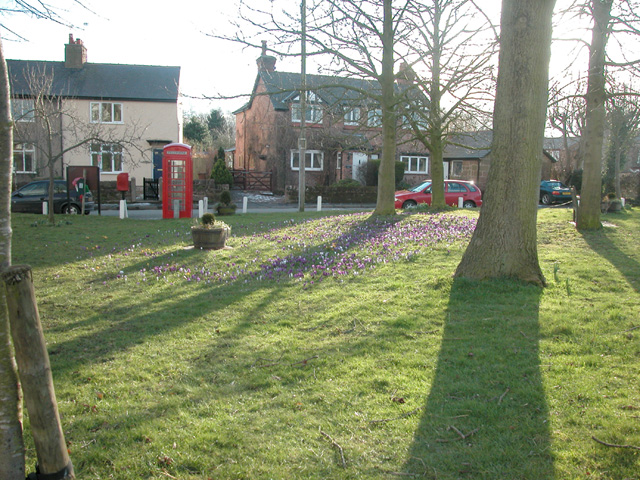
- The village green, Puddington

- Location within Cheshire
- Population: 381 (2011 census)
- OS grid reference: SJ328733
- Civil parish: Puddington
- Unitary authority: Cheshire West and Chester
- Ceremonial county: Cheshire
- Region: North West
- Country: England
- Sovereign state: United Kingdom
- Post town: NESTON
- Postcode district: CH64
- Dialling code: 0151
- Police: Cheshire
- Fire: Cheshire
- Ambulance: North West
- UK Parliament: Chester North and Neston

Puddington is a village and civil parish on the Wirral Peninsula, in the unitary authority of Cheshire West and Chester and the ceremonial county of Cheshire, England. It is located to the south east of the town of Neston and close to the border with Wales.

Puddington has as its centrepiece a village green which hosts the annual Christmas carol service and summer barbecue.

In the 2001 census the village of Puddington had 325 inhabitants, which had risen to 381 by the 2011 census.

== History ==
The name derives from Old English, likely meaning 'Put(t)a's farmstead or settlement'.

Puddington is recorded in the Domesday Book of 1086 as Potitone, within the Wilaveston Hundred of Cheshire. Ten households were listed: four villagers, four smallholders, one slave and one 'riders'.

The population was measured at 139 in 1801, 176 in 1851, 126 in 1901 and increasing to 410 by 1951.

Formerly a township in Burton parish of the Wirral Hundred, it became a civil parish in 1866. Puddington was added to Wirral Rural District in 1894, then from 1933 most of the village became part of Chester Rural District. This was abolished on 1 April 1974, when local government reorganisation in England and Wales created the non-metropolitan district of Chester.

== Governance ==
The civil parish of Puddington includes the hamlets of Badger's Rake (part), Benty Heys, Croxton Wood, Shotwick and Woodbank. Part of Two Mills was also within its boundaries until 2015.

As of 2025, Puddington is within the Saughall and Mollington Ward of the Cheshire West and Chester unitary authority. Nationally, the village is in the Chester North and Neston parliamentary constituency.

== See also ==
- Listed buildings in Puddington, Cheshire
