= Dorothy Vernon =

English heiress (1544–1584)

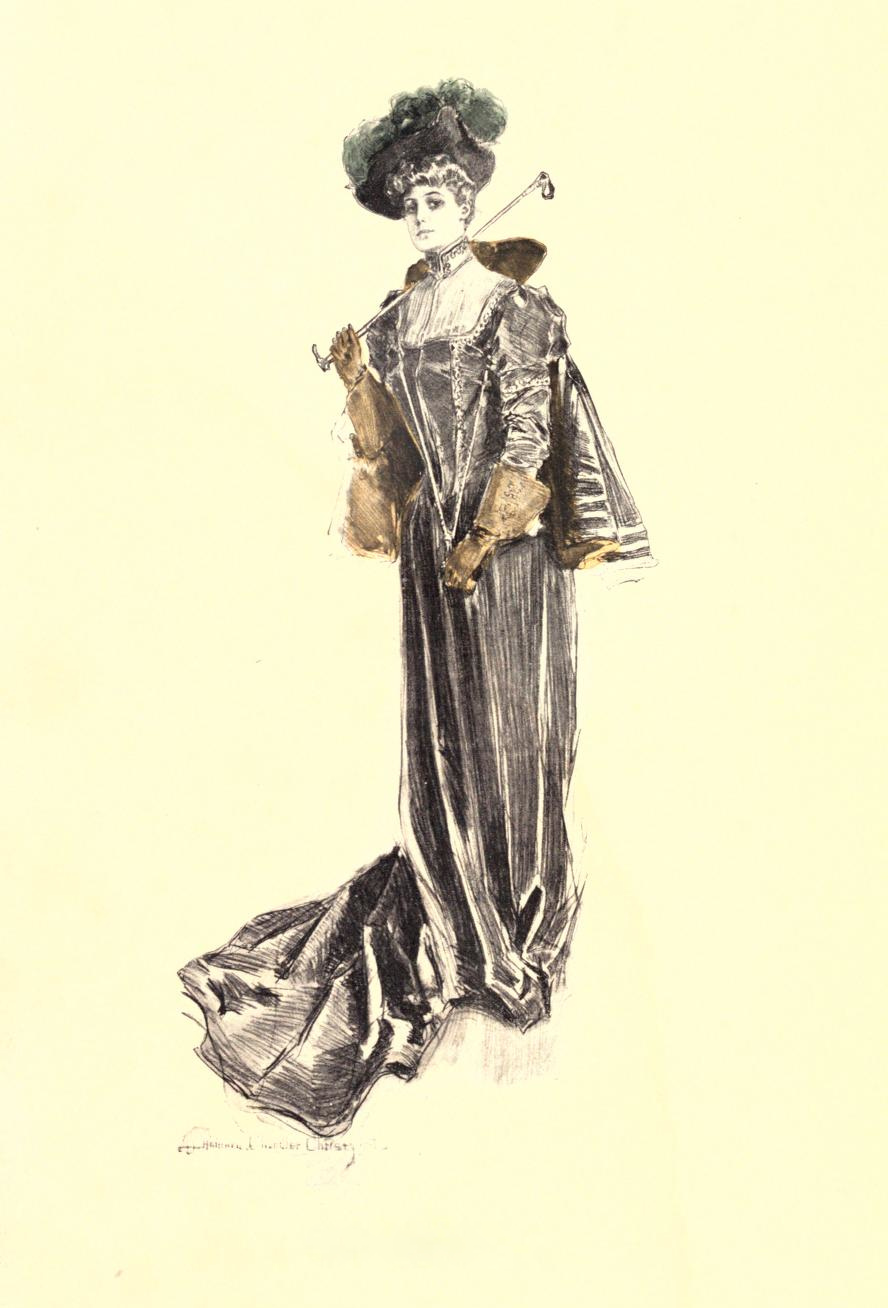
Dorothy Vernon as depicted by Howard Chandler Christy in the 1902 novel

Dorothy Vernon (1544 – 24 June 1584), the younger daughter of Sir George Vernon and Margaret née Talbois (or Tailboys), was the heiress of Haddon Hall, an English country house in Derbyshire with its origins in the 12th century. She married John Manners in 1563. The couple's descendants, the Dukes of Rutland, continue to own Haddon Hall. A legend grew up in the 19th century that Vernon and Manners eloped, and a number of novels, dramatisations and other works of fiction have been based on the legend.

== Family background and legend ==
Sir George Vernon was a prosperous and hospitable landowner in Derbyshire, and his family seat was at Haddon Hall, which is England's best preserved medieval manor house and a major tourist attraction. His second daughter, Dorothy, fell in love with John Manners (c. 1534 – 4 June 1611), the second son of Thomas Manners, the first Earl of Rutland. According to historian Paul Dare's 1924 book, Ayleston Manor and Church, Dorothy and John were second cousins.

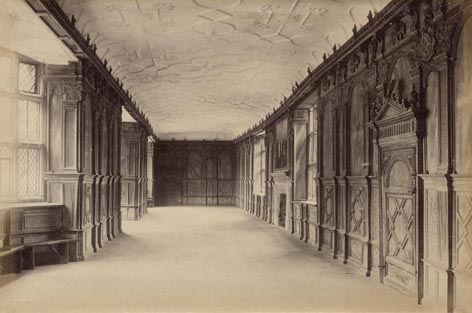
Haddon Hall's long gallery c.1890

According to legend (none of which can be verified), Sir George disapproved of the union, possibly because the Manners were Protestants, and the Vernons were Catholics, or possibly because the second son of an earl had uncertain financial prospects. According to the legend, Sir George forbade Manners from courting the famously beautiful and amiable Dorothy and forbade his daughter from seeing Manners. Torn by her love for her father and her love for John Manners, Dorothy fled Haddon Hall to elope with Manners. Shielded by the crowd during a ball given by Sir George, Dorothy slipped away and fled through the gardens, down stone steps and over a footbridge where Manners was waiting for her, and they rode away to be married. The supposed elopement became the subject of several novels and other works of fiction and drama. The marriage could have been held at Sir George's manor at Aylestone, Leicestershire, the Bakewell church or the chapel in Haddon Hall, although no written record survives. If indeed the elopement happened, the couple were soon reconciled with Sir George, as they inherited the estate on his death two years later. By then, Dorothy's older sister, Margaret (born c. 1540) had been safely married off to an Earl. Dorothy and John had at least two children, George and Roger Manners.

Dorothy Vernon died in 1584 and was interred in the Vernon Chapel at All Saints Church, Bakewell. Sir John died in 1611 and was also interred in the chapel. George, their eldest son, inherited Haddon Hall upon the death of his father. He seems to have previously lived at Aylestone Hall as several of his children were baptised in the village church. Haddon Hall remains in the Manners family to the present day.

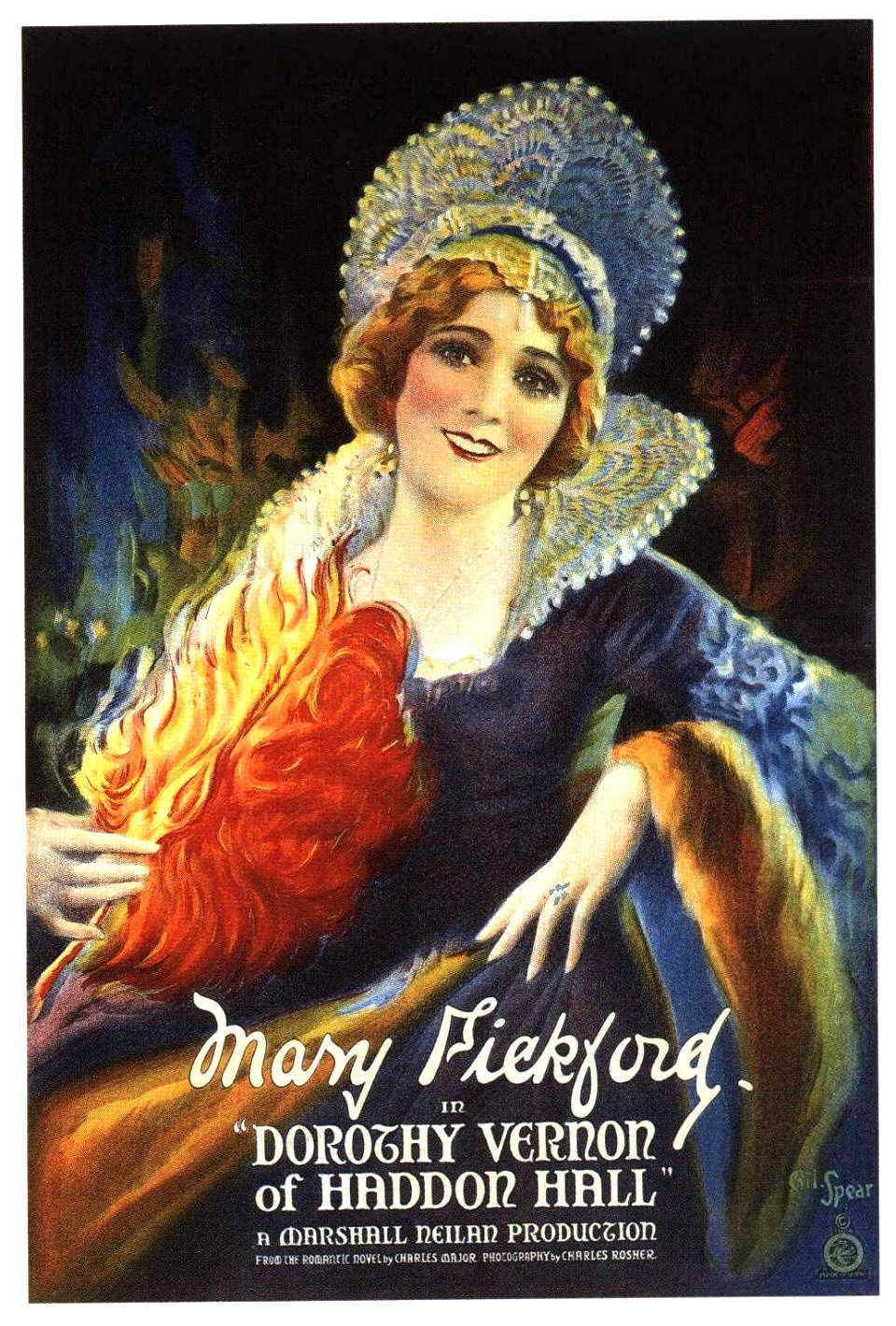
A poster advertising the 1924 film adaptation

== Ancestry ==
Ancestry of Dorothy Vernon

16. Sir William Vernon (d. 1467)
8. Sir Henry Vernon (d. 1515)
17. Margaret Swynfen
4. Richard Vernon (d. 1516)
18. John Talbot, 2nd Earl of Shrewsbury
9. Lady Anne Talbot (d. 1494)
19. Lady Elizabeth Butler (d. 1473)
2. Sir George Vernon (d. 1565)
20. Sir Thomas Dymoke (abt 1428-bef 12 Mar 1470)
10. Sir Robert Dymoke (abt 1461-1544)
21. Margaret Welles (d. 1480)
5. Margaret Dymoke
22. Alexander Cressener
11. Jane Cressener
23. Cecily Ratcliffe
1. Dorothy Vernon
24. William Tailboys, de jure 7th Baron Kyme
12. Sir Robert Tailboys (d. 1495)
25. Hon Elizabeth Bonville (d. 1491)
6. Sir George Tailboys (d. 1538)
26. Sir John Heron (abt 1418-1461)
13. Elizabeth Heron
27. Elizabeth Heron (abt 1422-aft 1470/1)
3. Margaret Tailboys
28. Sir William Gascoigne
14. Sir William Gascoigne (abt 1450-1487)
29. Joan Neville
7. Elizabeth Gascoigne
30. Henry Percy, 3rd Earl of Northumberland
15. Lady Margaret Percy
31. Eleanor Poynings

== Dorothy Vernon in fiction ==
- A story entitled "King of the Peak – A Derbyshire Tale" (Sir George Vernon was known as the "King of the Peak"), by Allan Cunningham, published in The London Magazine in 1822.
- An 1823 novel The King of the Peak – A Romance, in three volumes by William Bennett (1796–1879), writing under the pseudonym Lee Gibbons.
- "The Love Steps of Dorothy Vernon", a short story by Eliza Meteyard (1816–1879), writing under a pseudonym in 1849. It was first published in the 29 December 1849 issue of Eliza Cook's Journal and then in The Reliquary, October 1860, p. 79.
- A light opera of 1892, Haddon Hall by Arthur Sullivan, with libretto by Sydney Grundy.
- A novel Dorothy Vernon of Haddon Hall written by American Charles Major in 1902.
- A play of 1903, based on the novel, by American playwright Paul Kester that debuted on Broadway.
- A 1906 adaptation of Kester's play by Fred Terry and Julia Neilson, titled Dorothy o' the Hall.
- A film of 1924, starring Mary Pickford, also based on Major's novel.

== Bibliography ==
- Dare, M. Paul (1924). Ayleston Manor and Church. Leicester: Edgar Backus.
- Rayner, Simeon (2006). The History and Antiquities of Haddon Hall (PDF). London: R. Moseley. Archived from the original (PDF) on 4 March 2016.
- Smith, G. Le Blanc (1906). Haddon, the Manor, the Hall, Its Lords and Traditions. E. Stock.
- Trutt, David (2006). Haddon Hall's Dorothy Vernon – The Story of the Legend (PDF). Los Angeles: Haddon Hall Books. Archived from the original (PDF) on 4 March 2016.
- Trutt, David (2007). Poems of Haddon Hall. Los Angeles: Haddon Hall Books. Archived from the original on 3 June 2012.
