= Vernon family =

Wealthy English family

Vernon of Shipbrook coat of arms

The Vernon family was a wealthy, prolific and widespread English family with 11th-century origins in Vernon, Normandy, France. Their extant titles include Baron Vernon and Vernon baronets of Shotwick Park.

== Vernon of Shipbrook, Cheshire ==
William de Vernon arrived in England at the time of the Norman Conquest and was granted lands in the County Palatine of Chester under the patronage of Hugh d'Avranches, 1st Earl of Chester. His son Richard was created a baron and was seated at Shipbrook Castle, near Northwich, Cheshire.

Warine Vernon, elder son of the 4th Baron, had no male heir and his extensive estate was divided between his daughters and his brother Ralph, Rector of Hanwell. Ralph's son, also Ralph b 1241, was reputed to have lived so long he earned the soubriquet "The Old Liver". His heir was Sir Richard, son of his second marriage to Matilda Grosvenor of Kinderton, Cheshire. The Shipbrook Barony expired when his grandson Sir Richard, was captured after the Battle of Shrewsbury in 1403 and executed for treason.

Other branches of the family flourished, and its influence spread beyond Cheshire over the following centuries, partly as a result of judicious intermarriage.

== Vernon of Nether Haddon and Tong ==
Vernon of Haddon arms

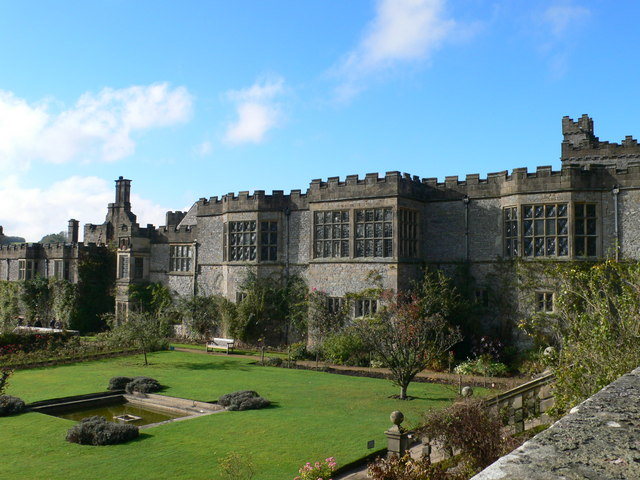
Haddon Hall, Derbyshire: photograph by Eirian Evans

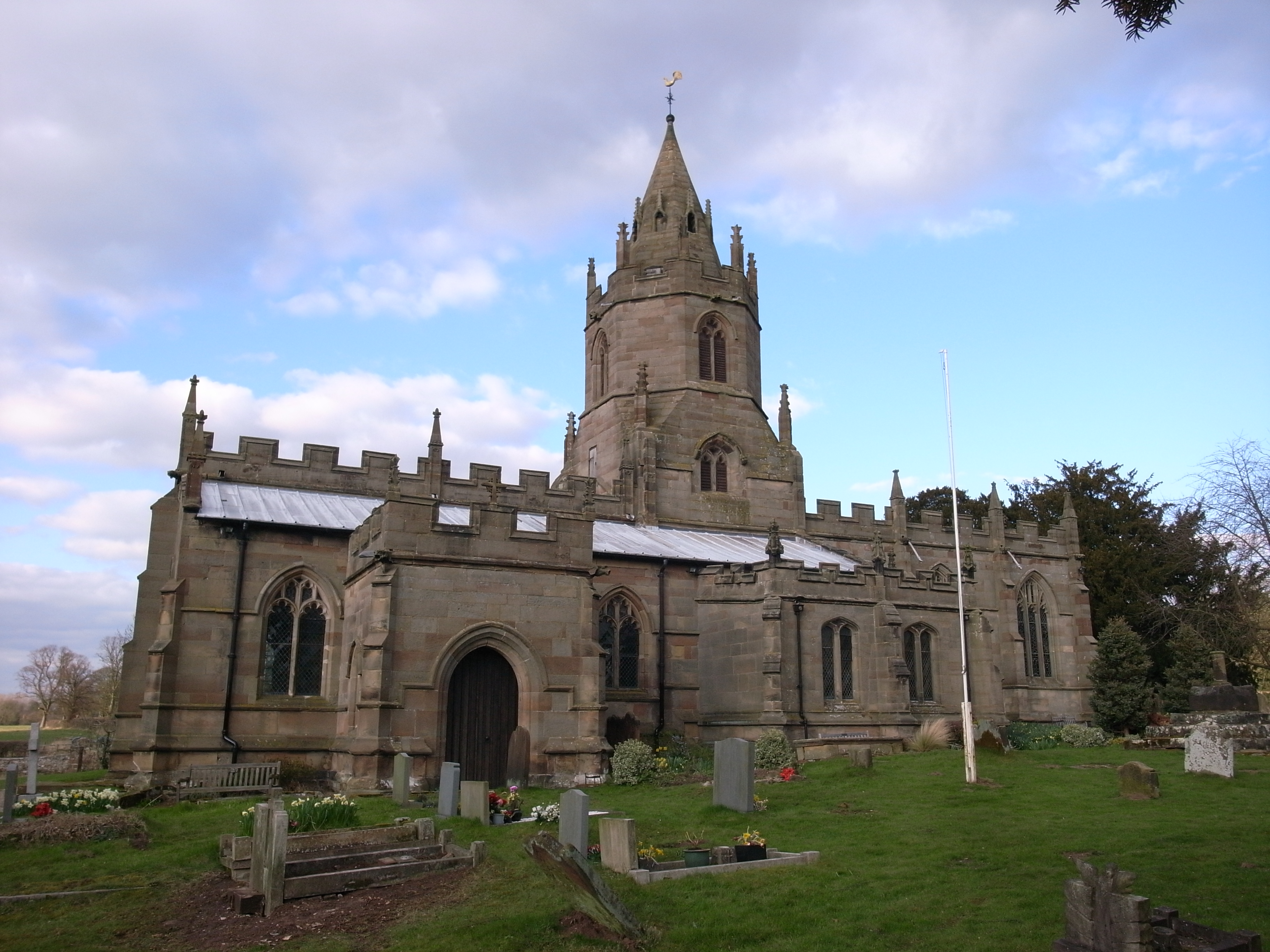
St Bartholomew's church, Tong, shrine church of the Vernon family.

Sir Richard de Vernon (d. c. 1215) acquired the manor by his late 12th century marriage to the heiress of Nether Haddon and Haddon Hall, Alice Avenell, daughter of William Avenell. His son, Sir William Vernon, a High Sheriff of Lancashire and Chief Justice of Cheshire 1229–1236, married Margaret, the heiress of Sir Robert de Stockport. His son Richard was Chief Justice in 1249. A subsequent descendant, also Richard, married Juliana, daughter of Sir Fulk de Pembrugge, the heiress of Tong Castle, in the mid-1300s.

Sir Richard Vernon (1390–1451) of Haddon and Tong married his distant cousin and sole heiress Benedicta de Ludlow, daughter of Isabella de Lingen and Sir John de Ludlow of Hodnet. Benedicta's mother, Lady Isabella Pembrugge (née Lingen) founded the chantry and college at Tong, Shropshire in memory of her three departed husbands. Tong Church contains many of the Vernon tombs. Benedicta de Ludlow, as well as the Lingen and Pembrugge Arms, are depicted in the chapel's stained glass window at Haddon Hall. Sir Richard Vernon was High Sheriff of Staffordshire for 1416 and 1427 and Derbyshire and Nottinghamshire for 1422 and 1425. He also represented Derbyshire and Staffordshire in the House of Commons of the United Kingdom of which he was Speaker in 1426. He was Treasurer of Calais in the last year of his life (1450–1451). He was buried at Tong.

His son Sir William was Knight-Constable of England and succeeded him as Treasurer of Calais and MP for Derbyshire and Staffordshire, while other descendants became the Vernons of Hodnet. Sir William's son Sir Henry Vernon KB (1441–1515) became governor and treasurer to Arthur, Prince of Wales, married Anne Talbot daughter of the Earl of Shrewsbury and rebuilt Haddon Hall.

Sir Henry's grandson, Sir George Vernon, the last of the Haddon Vernons, owned a vast acreage and was locally styled King of the Peak. He died in 1565 without a male heir and his estates passed to his daughters. Haddon passed to Dorothy Vernon who married Sir John Manners and became ancestors of the Dukes of Rutland, present owners of Haddon Hall.

Vernon memorials in St Bartholomew's church, Tong

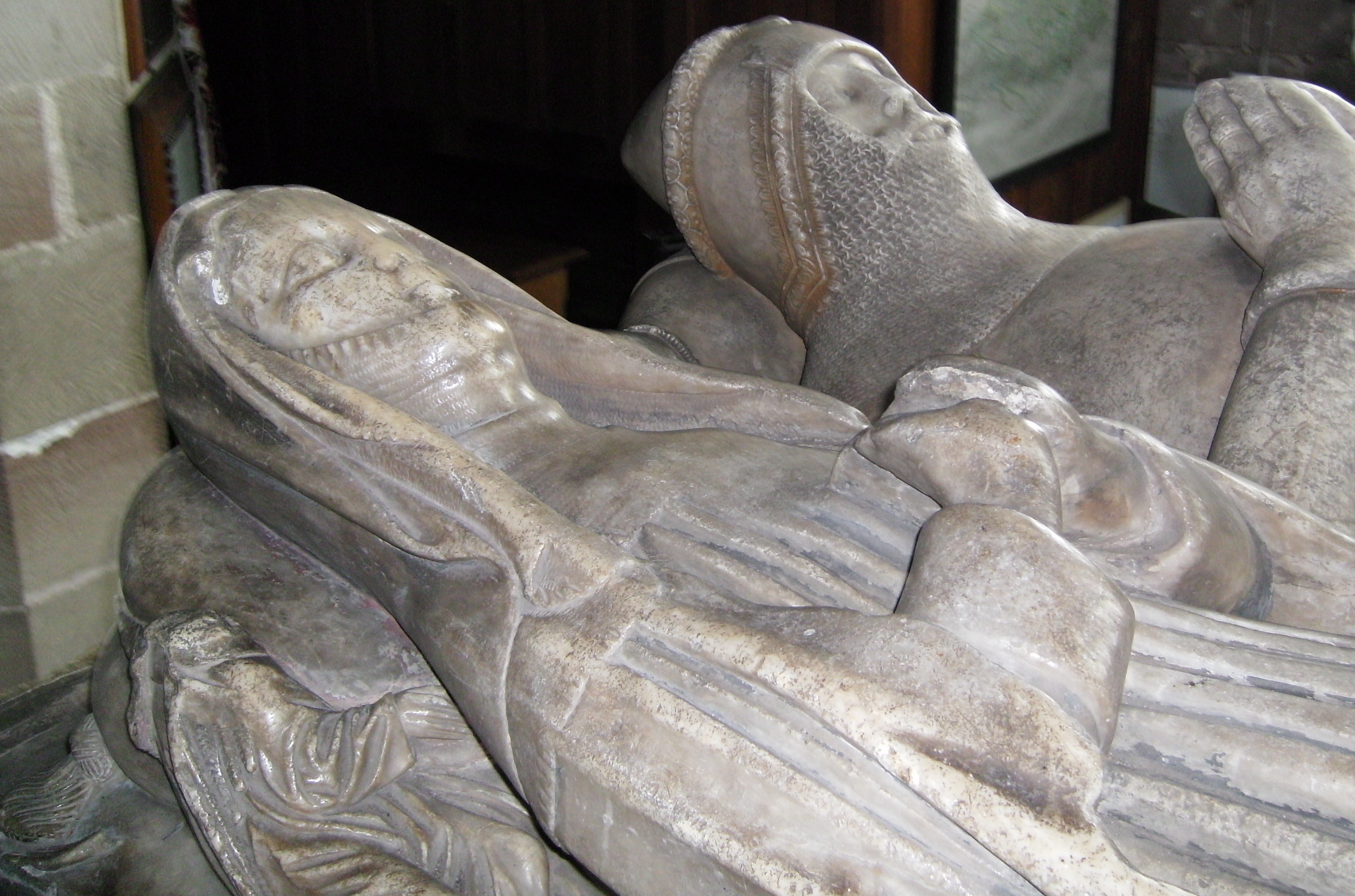
Isabel de Lingen (died 1446) and her first husband, Sir Fulke de Pembrugge (died 1409). Isabel founded the chantry and college at Tong for her own and her husbands' souls. It became the shrine church of the Vernon family of Haddon Hall. Her daughter by her second husband Sir John de Ludlow was Benedicta de Ludlow and is buried in the church

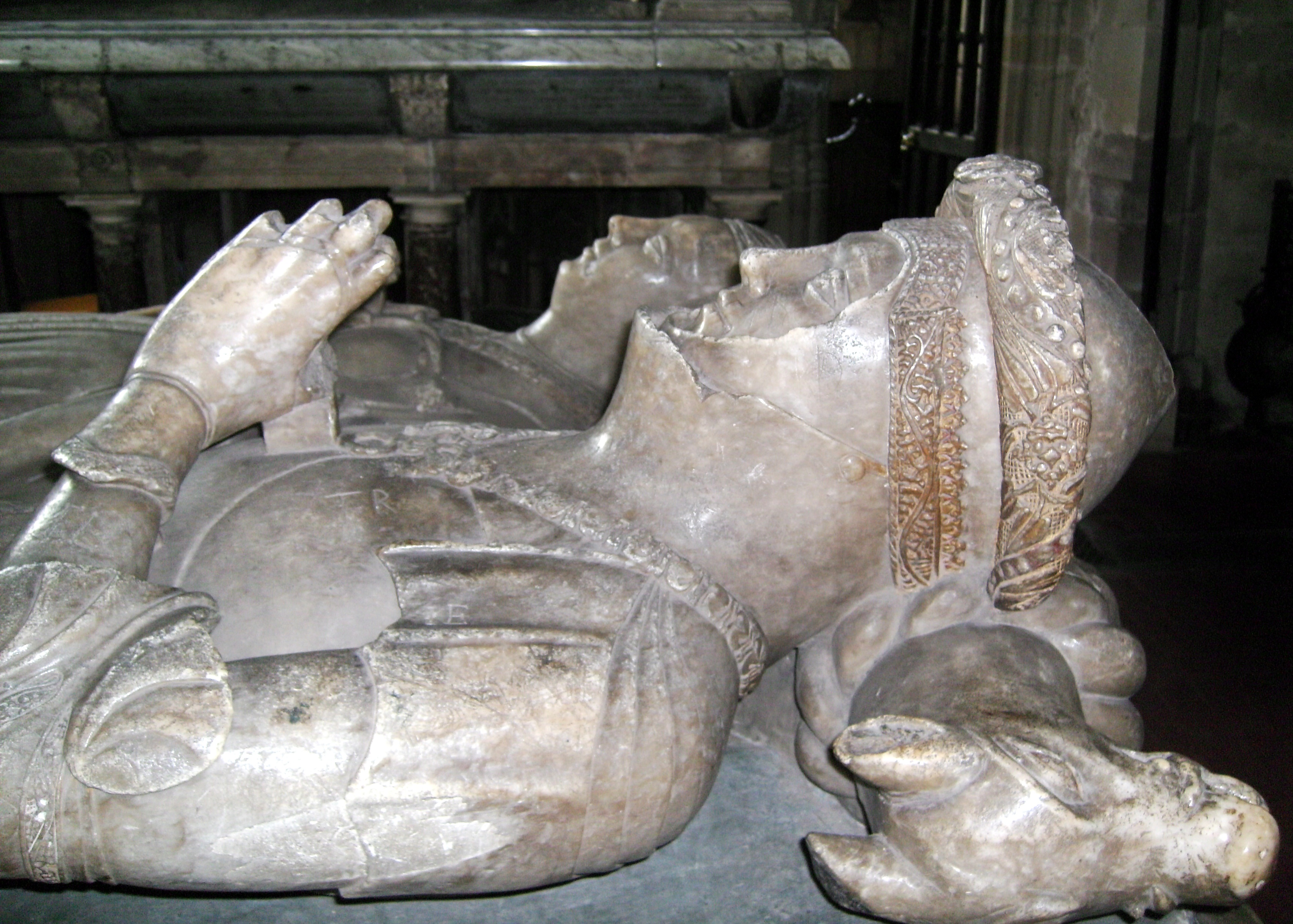
Richard Vernon (died 1451, foreground) and Benedicta de Ludlow. Through their marriage the Vernons of Haddon Hall obtained Tong. Tomb in St Bartholomew's Church, Tong, Shropshire. Richard was Speaker of the House of Commons in 1426.

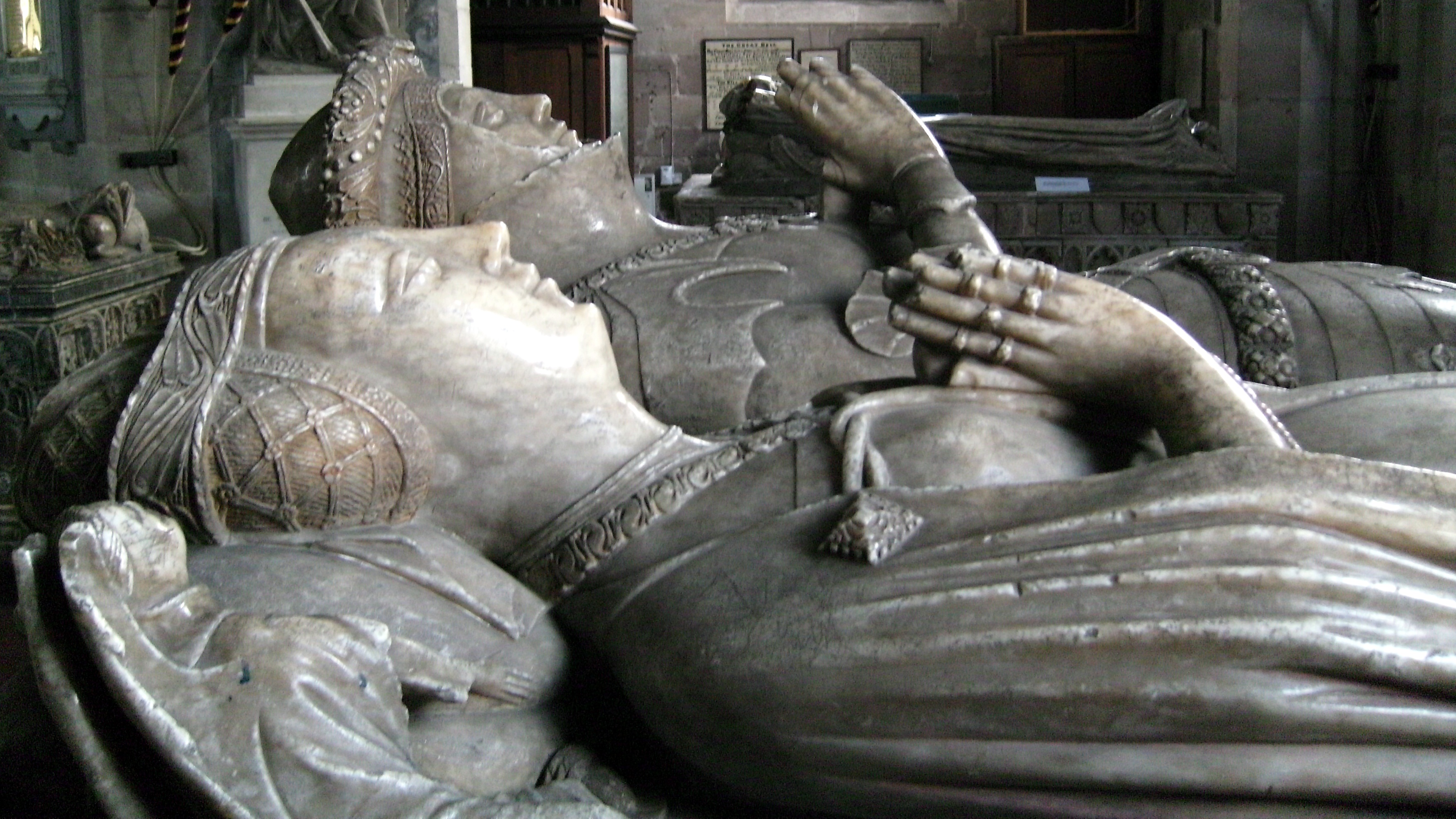
Benedicta de Ludlow (foreground) and Richard Vernon (died 1451). This tomb has the most impressive sculpture at Tong. Richard was the great nephew of Sir Fulke de Pembrugge as his grandmother Julia de Pembruugue was Sir Fulke sister.

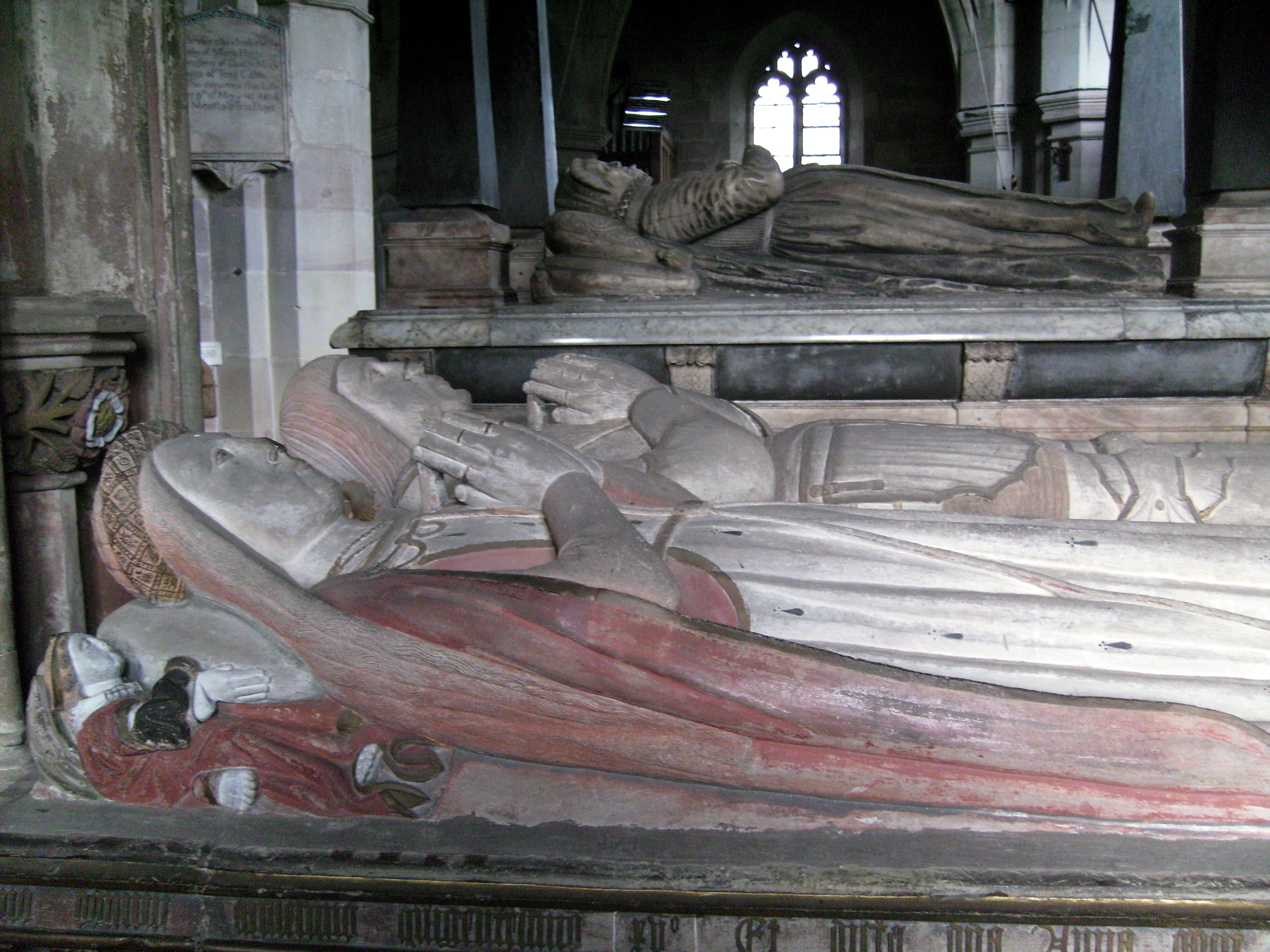
Tomb of Anne Talbot (died 1494) and Henry Vernon (died 1515). Henry was put in charge of Catherine of Aragon and Arthur, Prince of Wales by Henry VII and was with them when Arthur died at Ludlow in 1502.

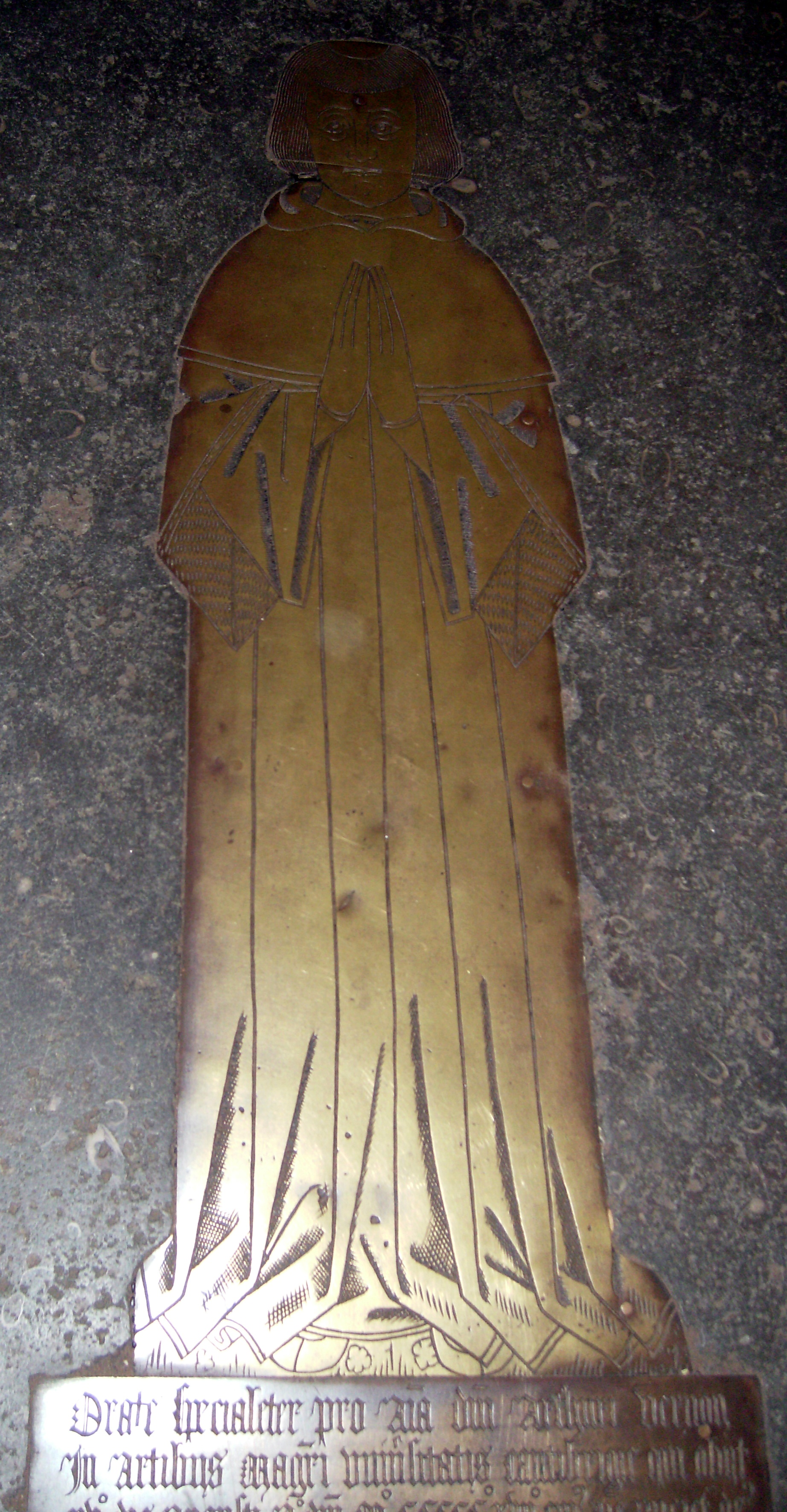
Arthur Vernon, priest and son of Anne Talbot and Henry Vernon, in the robes of a University of Cambridge MA, on his tomb in the floor of the Golden Chapel at Tong.

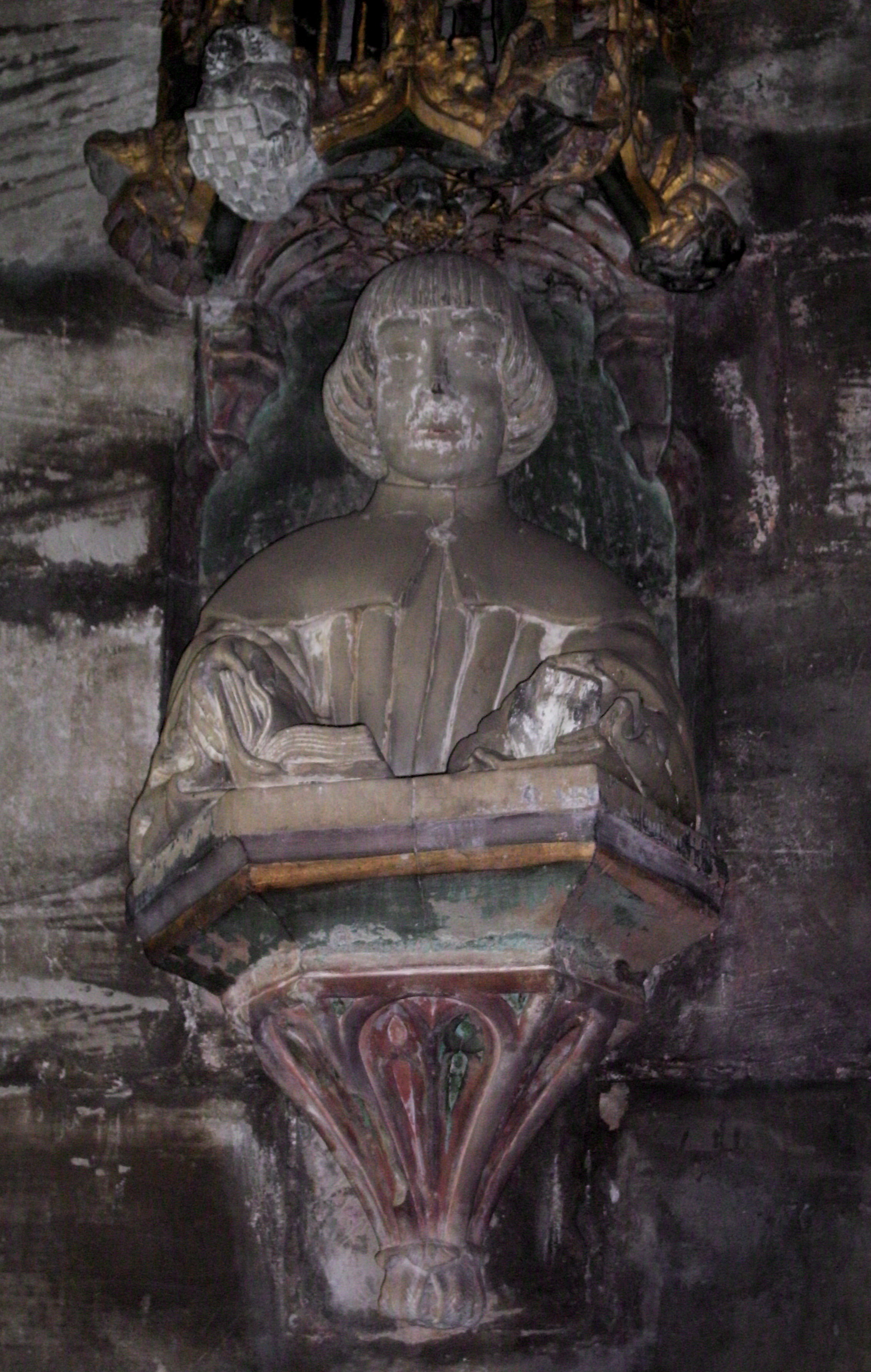
Arthur Vernon portrayed preaching in the Golden Chapel at Tong.

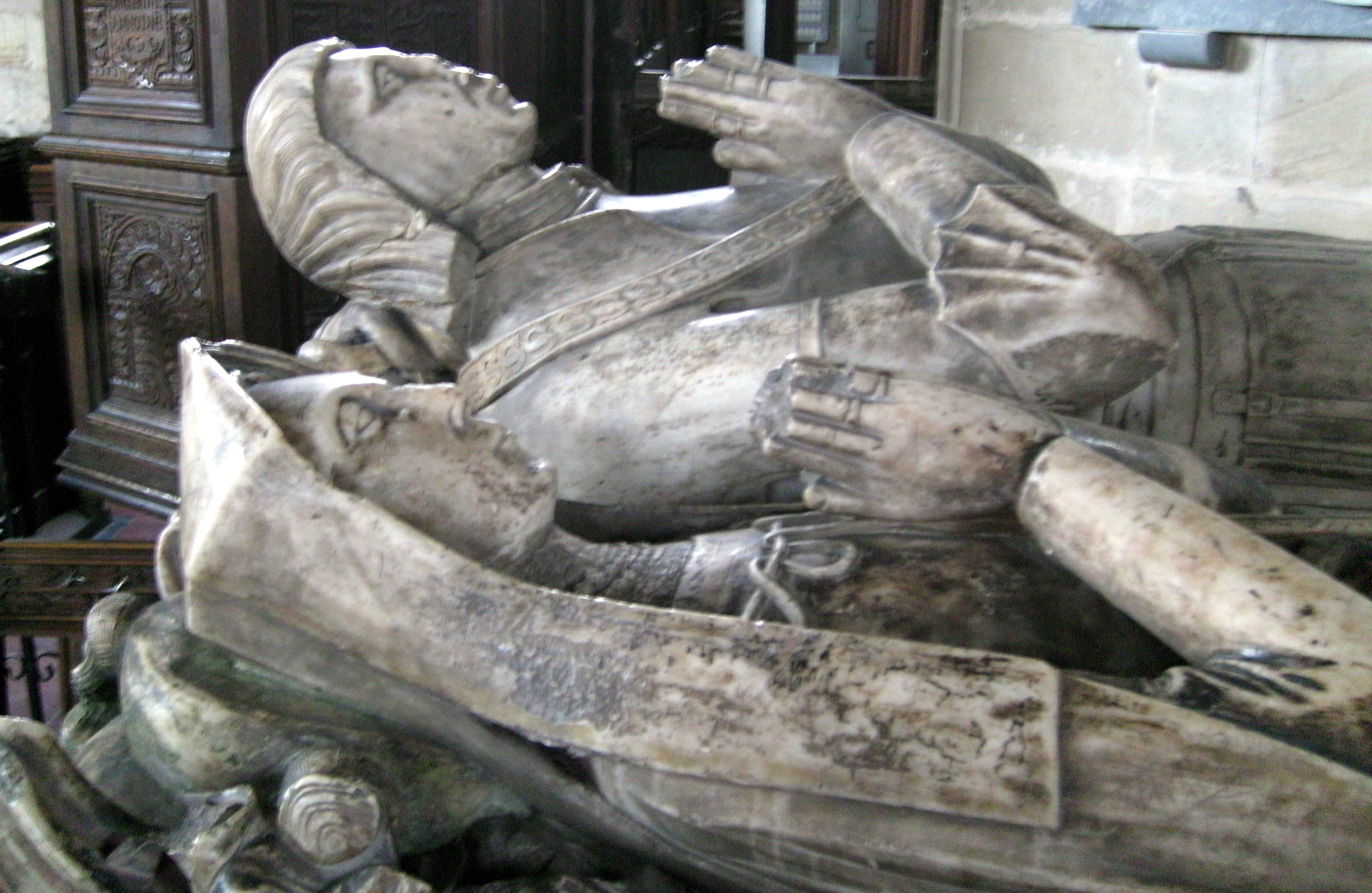
Margaret Dymmok and Richard Vernon (died 1517). After his death, Margaret married Sir Richard Manners.

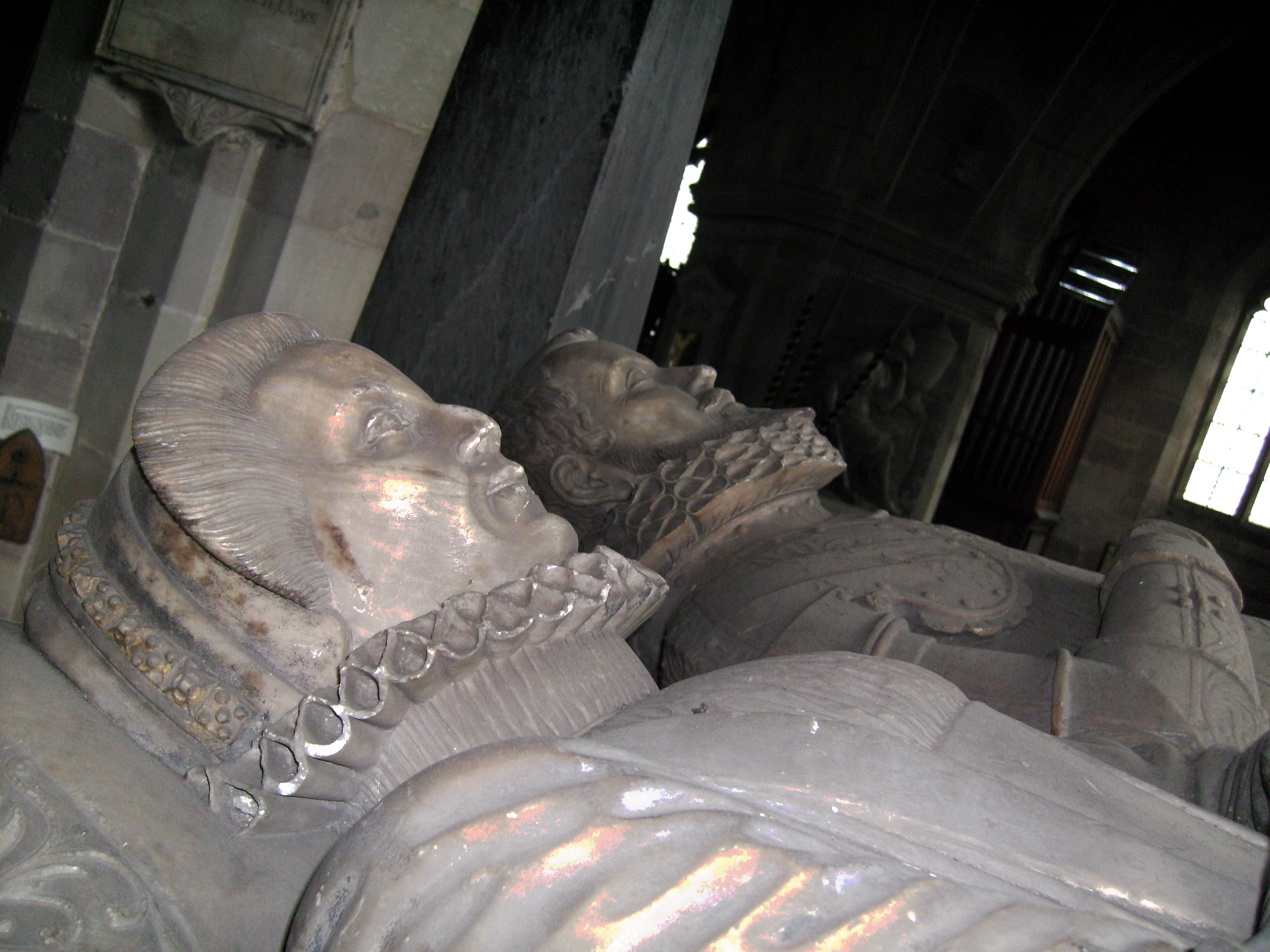
Margaret Vernon and Thomas Stanley (died 1576). George Vernon, son of Richard and Margaret, died without male heir. He left his estates to his daughters: Haddon to Dorothy and Tong to Margaret, who married Stanley, the second son of Edward Stanley, 3rd Earl of Derby. Part of a double family tomb.

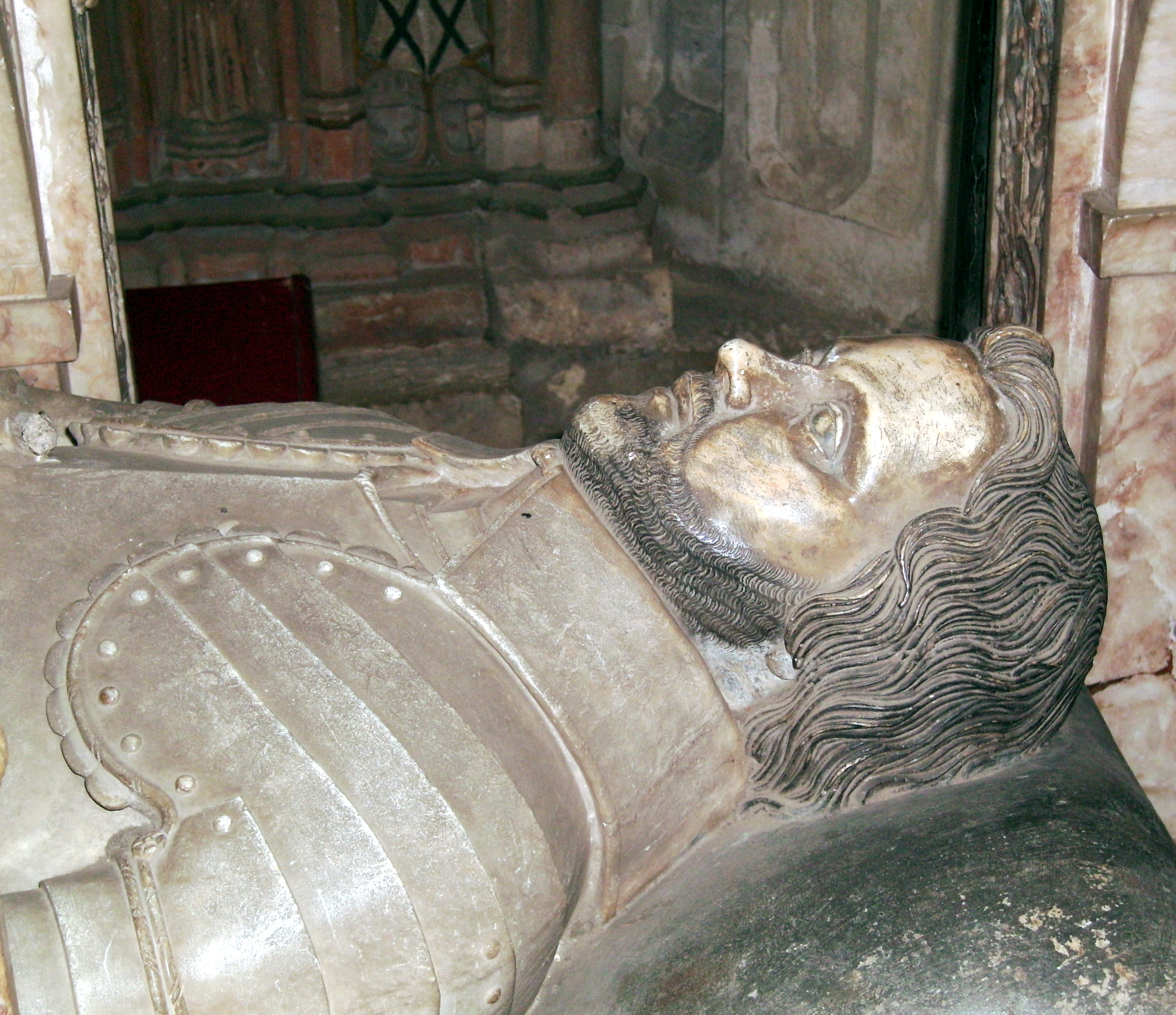
Edward Stanley (died 1632), last of the Vernon heirs to own Tong, which he sold to Thomas Harries about 1630. He was the father of Venetia Stanley, a famous courtesan of the early 17th century. Lower tier of a double family tomb.

== Vernon of Lostock and Haslington ==
Sir Thomas Vernon, the second son of Sir Ralph, The Old Liver was excluded from the main succession of Shipbrook of 1325 in favour of his younger stepbrother. He married Joan Lostock, heiress of Lostock Gralam and settled at Haslington Hall.

Eleven generations of Vernons lived at Haslington until Muriel daughter and heiress of Sir George Vernon, Judge of Common Pleas, married her distant cousin Sir Henry Vernon (1616–1658) of Sudbury Hall, Derbyshire and their estates merged. For further and later detail see Vernon of Sudbury and Hilton below.

== Vernon of London and Nacton ==
Ralph Vernon second son of Robert Vernon (b1520) and Isabella Levensage of Haslington settled in London. His great-grandson James Vernon (1646–1727) was a Secretary of State to William III. He was the father of James Vernon (d1756) who settled in Suffolk and of Admiral Edward Vernon (1684–1757). James' son Francis Vernon (1715–1783), Member of Parliament for Ipswich, was created Baron Orwell of Orwell Park, Nacton, Suffolk in 1762, Viscount Orwell in 1762 and Earl of Shipbrook in 1777. The Earldom was extinct on his death in 1783.

== Vernon of Hodnet, Shropshire ==
Vernon of Hodnet arms

Humphrey Vernon (d1542), 3rd son of Sir Henry Vernon (d1515) of Haddon, married Alice Ludlow heiress of Hodnet, Shropshire and settled there. His great-grandson Henry Vernon was created the first of the Vernon baronets in 1660. This baronetcy expired on the death of the third baronet in 1725.

== Vernon of Houndshill ==
Thomas Vernon the second son of Humphrey Vernon (d1542) of Hodnet died in 1556 and his son Walter (1552–1592) settled at Houndshill, Staffordshire. His grandson Sir Edward Vernon (1584–1657) married his cousin Margaret Vernon thus combining the Houndshill, Haddon and Hilton estates.

== Vernon of Clontarf ==
John Vernon, (d1670) the third son of Sir Edward Vernon (1584–1657) of Houndshill settled at Clontarf Castle and a branch of the family existed there until the mid 20th century. The writer Cyril Connolly was of this line through his mother Muriel Maud Vernon.

== Vernon of Sudbury and Hilton ==
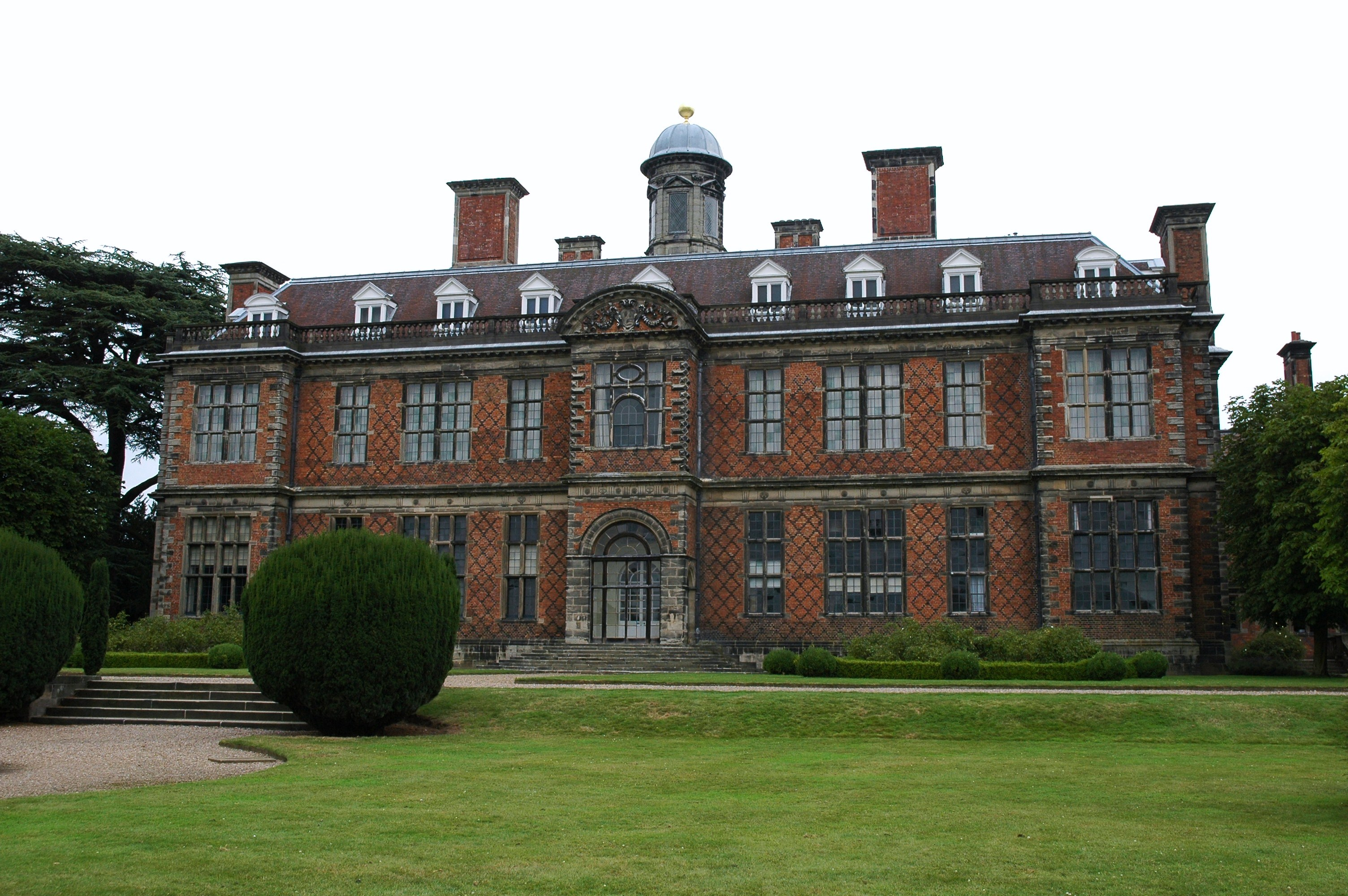
Sudbury Hall

Sir John Vernon (died 1545) was the fourth son of Sir Henry Vernon (died 1515) of Haddon and Tong. He was a member of the King's Council for Wales, High Sheriff of Derbyshire and Nottinghamshire in 1528 and Custos Rotulorum of Derbyshire. He married Ellen Montgomery, one of the three heiress daughters of Sir John Montgomery (died 1513) of Marchington and Sudbury, Derbyshire; the Sudbury estate thereby passed to the Vernon family.

Their only son Henry Vernon (died 1569) married Margaret Swynnerton, co-heiress of Humphrey Swynnerton of Hilton Hall, Staffordshire thus combining two substantial estates. They had two sons, John (dsp 1600) and Henry (died 1592); neither had a male heir, but the family wealth was preserved by the marriage of Henry's only child, Margarett, to her third cousin Sir Edward Vernon (1584–1658) of Houndshill, Staffordshire.

Vernon-Venables arms

Their eldest son Henry Vernon (1615–1659) married a distant kinswoman Meriall Vernon, only surviving daughter of judge Sir George Vernon of Haslington, Cheshire; the extensive Sudbury, Haslington and Houndshill estates were inherited by their elder surviving son, George, with the Hilton estate passing to the younger one, Henry.

George Vernon the elder son (1636–1702) continued the Sudbury line. His son (by his third marriage, to Catherine Vernon, eldest daughter of Sir Thomas Vernon, merchant of London) Henry Vernon, Member of Parliament for Stafford, married Ann Pigott, niece and heiress of Peter Venables the last Baron Kinderton. Their only surviving son George (1709–1780), Member of Parliament for Lichfield and Derby, changed his surname in 1728 to Venables-Vernon and was created the first Baron Vernon in 1762.

A younger son Edward changed his name to Harcourt on marriage and later became Archbishop of York. See Earl Harcourt. The Vernon Barony remained in the family until 2000 when the 10th Baron died and the Barony passed to a distant Vernon-Harcourt fifth cousin.

For the continuation of the Hilton line see below.

== Vernon of Hilton ==
Henry Vernon (1637–1711) second son of Henry Vernon of Sudbury, resided at Hilton Hall. His eldest son Henry (1663–1732) largely rebuilt the moated Hilton Hall in the 1720s; he married (1717) Penelope Phillips (d.1727). Their eldest son, another Henry (1718–1763), married Henrietta Wentworth (1720–1786), youngest daughter of the earl of Strafford; she was a lady of the Bedchamber to the Princess Amelia, sister of King George III.

Their eldest son Henry Vernon (1748–1814) of Hilton was a page at the coronation of George III. He married an heiress, Penelope Graham. Their eldest son, Major-General Henry Charles Edward, substantially extended Hilton Hall in the 1830s. The family remained in occupation until the mid-20th century.

== Vernon of Hanbury ==
Arms of Vernon of Hanbury baronets

The Vernons of Hanbury descend from the ancient Cheshire family of Shipbrook and Whatcroft through the Vernons of Newcastle-under-Lyme. Richard Vernon (d. 1627) became rector of Hanbury in Worcestershire, and his son Edward Vernon (d. 1666) purchased the manor of Hanbury. His grandson, Chancery lawyer Thomas Vernon, built Hanbury Hall in grand style about 1710.

In 1885, Harry Foley Vernon of Hanbury, Member of Parliament for Worcestershire East 1861–68, was created the first of the Vernon Baronets of Hanbury. The Baronetcy was extinct in 1940 and the family relinquished the estate in 1953.

== Vernon of Great Budworth, Gawsworth and Shotwick Park ==
Arms of Vernon of Shotwick Park baronets

The Vernons descended from the ancient Cheshire family and from William Vernon (1434–1507) of Cogshall, Great Budworth, Cheshire who was a grandson of Richard Vernon of Lostock.

Thirteen generations of the family resided in Great Budworth and then Mutlow, Gawsworth.

In 1914, William Vernon, Chairman of W Vernon & Son (Millers) of London and Liverpool was created the first of the Vernon baronets of Shotwick Park. The Baronetcy remains extant.
