= Shipbrook Castle =

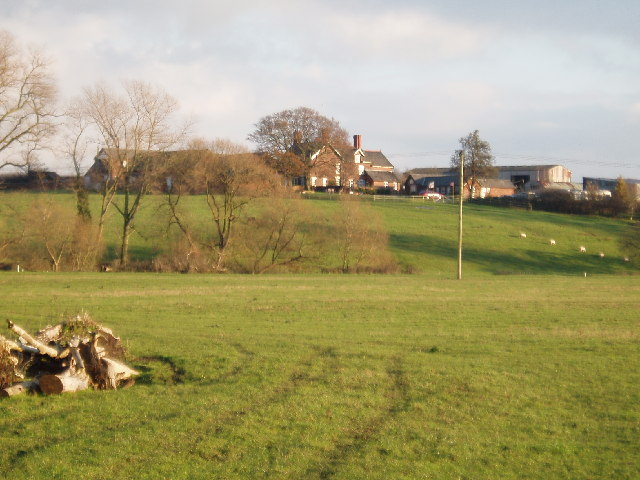
Shipbrook Hill viewed from near Shipbrook Bridge

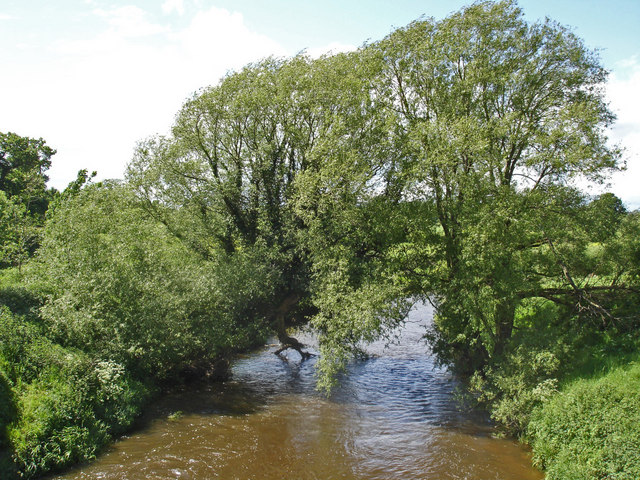
River Dane, looking downstream from Shipbrook Bridge

Shipbrook Castle near Davenham in Cheshire was a Norman castle situated beside the River Dane, the exact site of which is now unknown. Davenham is recorded in the Domesday Book as Devenham. Its name means "hamlet on the River Dane". The site of the Norman Shipbrook Castle by the River Dane is indicated by the name of Castle Hill, between Shipbrook Bridge and Shipbrook Hill Farm, but no traces now remain. The site of the castle is thought to be on Castle Hill near Shipbrook Bridge. Castles such as Shipbrook were built during the Welsh Wars. It was demolished in about 1850.

== Vernon family of Shipbrook ==
Arms of Vernon of Shipbrook

William de Vernon arrived in England at the time of the Norman Conquest and was granted lands in the County Palatine of Chester under the patronage of Hugh d'Avranches, 1st Earl of Chester. His son Richard was created a baron and was seated at Shipbrook.

Warine Vernon, elder son of the 4th Baron, had no male heir and his extensive estate was divided between his daughters and his brother Ralph, Rector of Hanwell. Ralph's son, also Ralph (b.1241), was reputed to have lived so long he earned the soubriquet "The Old Liver". His heir was Sir Richard, son of his second marriage to Matilda Grosvenor of Kinderton, Cheshire. The Barony expired when his grandson Sir Richard, was captured after the Battle of Shrewsbury in 1403 and executed for treason.

Branches of the family flourished and its influence spread beyond Cheshire over the following centuries, partly as a result of judicious intermarriage. (See Vernon family).

=== Earl of Shipbrook ===
In 1777 Francis Vernon, 1st Earl of Shipbrook (1715 – 15 October 1783), was created Earl of Shipbrook, in the Peerage of Ireland. The full title was "Earl of Shipbrooke of Newry in the County of Down in the said Kingdom" (of Ireland).
