= Vernon baronets =

Set index for Vernon baronets

There have been three baronetcies created for members of the Vernon family, one in the Baronetage of England and two in the Baronetage of the United Kingdom. As of 2026, one creation is extant.

- Vernon baronets of Hodnet (1660)
- Vernon baronets of Hanbury Hall (1885)
- Vernon baronets of Shotwick Park (1914)

== See also ==
- Baron Vernon
- Earl of Shipbrook
