= Henry Vernon (died 1515) =

Tudor courtier

- Vernon of Haddon arms
- Born: 1441
- Died: 1515 (aged 73–74)
- Noble family: Vernon
- Spouse: Anne Talbot
- Father: William Vernon
- Mother: Margaret Swynfen

Sir Henry Vernon, KB (1441–13 April 1515), was a Tudor-era English landowner, politician, and courtier, and a member of the Vernon family. He was the Controller of the household of Arthur, Prince of Wales, the eldest son of Henry VII of England and heir to the throne until Arthur's death at age 15.

== Family ==
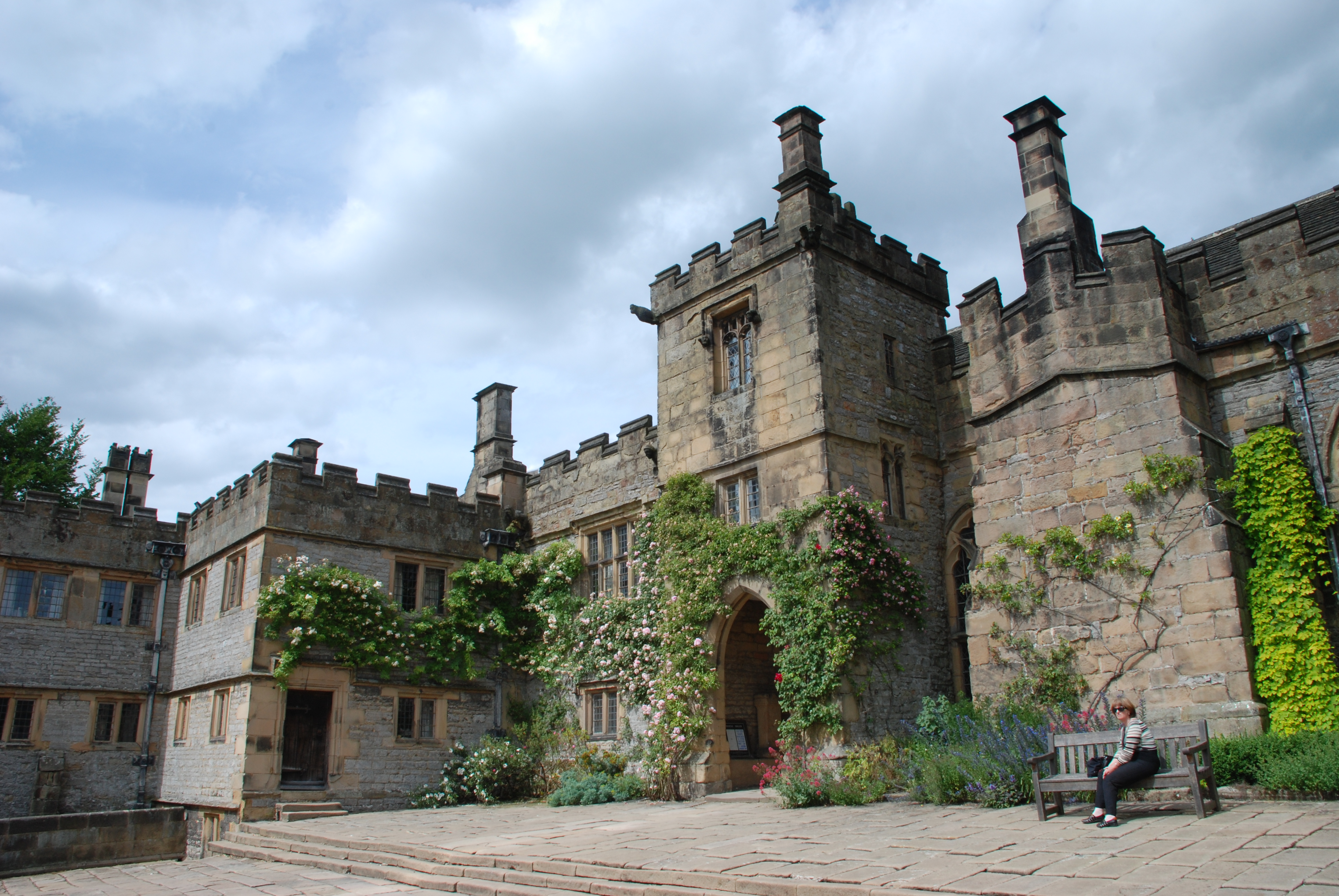
Haddon Hall, seat of the Vernon family

Vernon was born into the prominent Vernon family of Cheshire and Derbyshire. His father, William Vernon, was Knight-Constable of England, Treasurer of Calais, and a Member of Parliament, while his grandfather Richard Vernon had been the Speaker of the House of Commons. His mother, Margaret Swynfen, was the heiress of Sir Robert Pype. Henry Vernon was one of twelve children, and was the principal heir, succeeding his father at the latter's death in 1467.

== Wars of the Roses ==
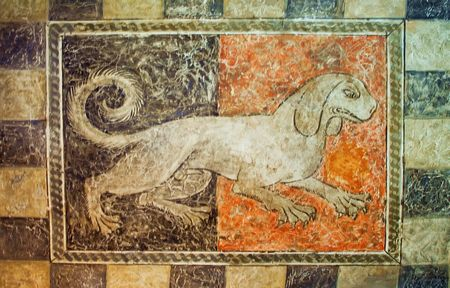
The image of a talbot (dog) on the dining room ceiling at Haddon Hall symbolized the marriage of Vernon to the daughter of the Earl of Shrewsbury

Vernon came of age during the Wars of the Roses and adroitly steered through the turbulent times. He had family connections to the Lancastrian side through his marriage to Anne Talbot, daughter of John Talbot, 2nd Earl of Shrewsbury, but his own sympathies seem to have inclined towards the Yorkists. Vernon's involvement in the events of the day is reflected in surviving correspondence to him from the Duke of Clarence summoning him to the field of battle, and a letter from Richard Neville "the Kingmaker" which includes the only known surviving sample of Warwick's handwriting.

Despite Clarence's requests for Vernon to join the battles at Barnet and Tewkesbury. Though his answers to Clarence and Warwick do not survive, there is no evidence to suggest that he left his home, Haddon Hall. His response does not seem to have harmed his standing with the Yorkist faction; he was made an esquire of the body to both Edward IV and Richard III. He also served as MP for Derbyshire in 1478. Despite holding these Yorkist offices, Vernon transitioned to Tudor official.

== Tudor courtier ==
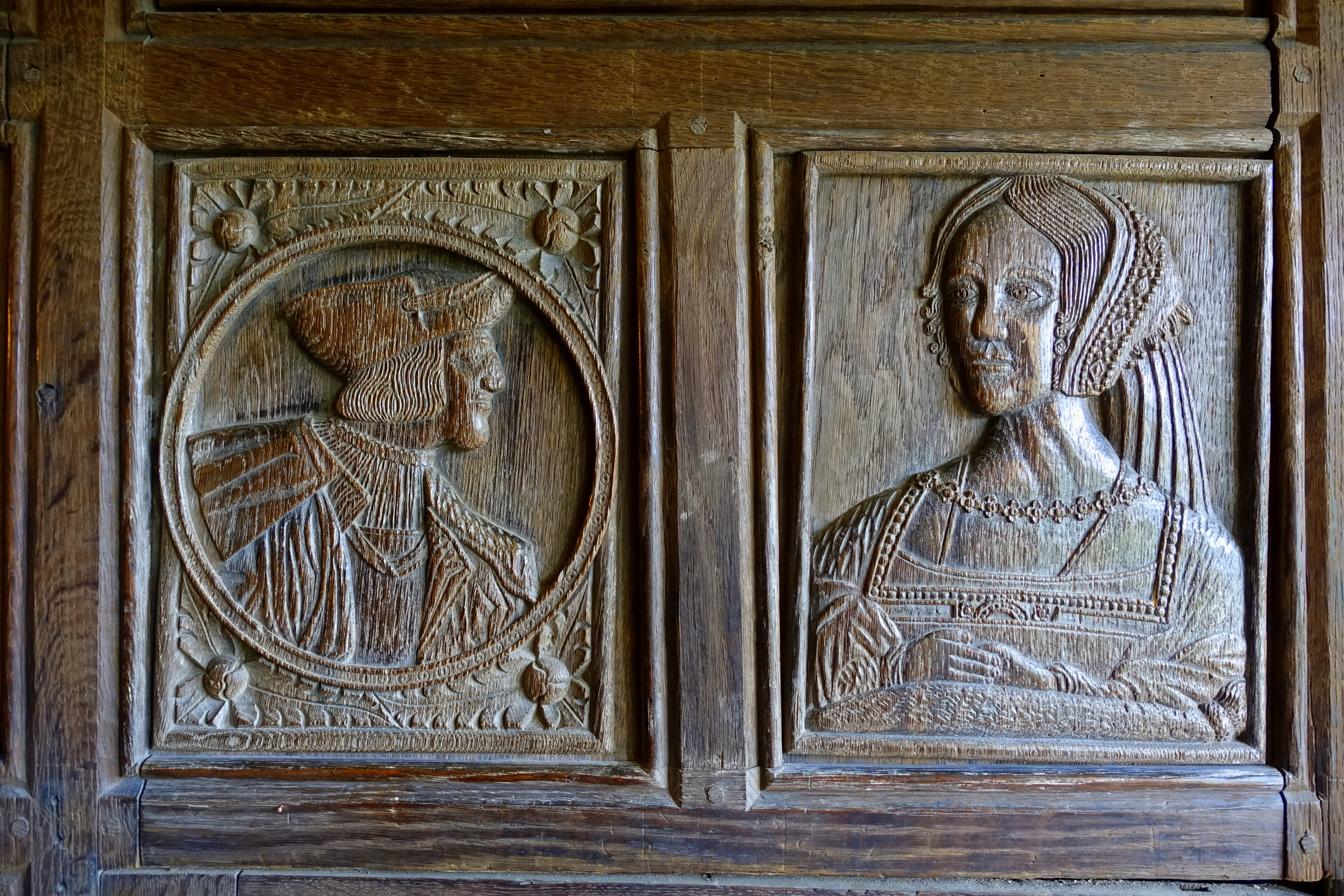
Wood paneling from Haddon Hall, depicting Vernon's benefactors Henry VII and Elizabeth of York

Almost immediately after the Tudor victory, Vernon came into favor with the new monarch, Henry VII. He was commended for his service to the king at Stoke Field, and was appointed governor and treasurer of the new king's heir, Arthur. When the latter was made Prince of Wales in 1489, Vernon was made a Knight of the Bath. One apartment at Haddon Hall was known as the "Prince's Chamber", as Arthur spent much of his time at Vernon's estate, as well as at Tong Castle, which Vernon greatly renovated around 1500. Vernon was one of the witnesses to the marriage contract between Arthur and Katherine of Aragon.

The young prince's death at the age of 15 was a blow to the influence of the Vernons, depriving them of opportunities at the royal court. The same year that the prince died, Vernon abducted an heiress, the widow Margaret Kebell, to marry his own son, Roger, possibly as an attempt to recoup some of the expenses he had incurred from years of royal service. His action, a blatant abuse of his authority, brought rebuke and a heavy fine from the king. Nevertheless, Vernon was still sent to accompany the king's daughter, Margaret Tudor, to Scotland for her marriage to James IV of Scotland, and he was later pardoned for his role in the abduction. He served as High Sheriff of Derbyshire in 1504.

== Marriage and children ==
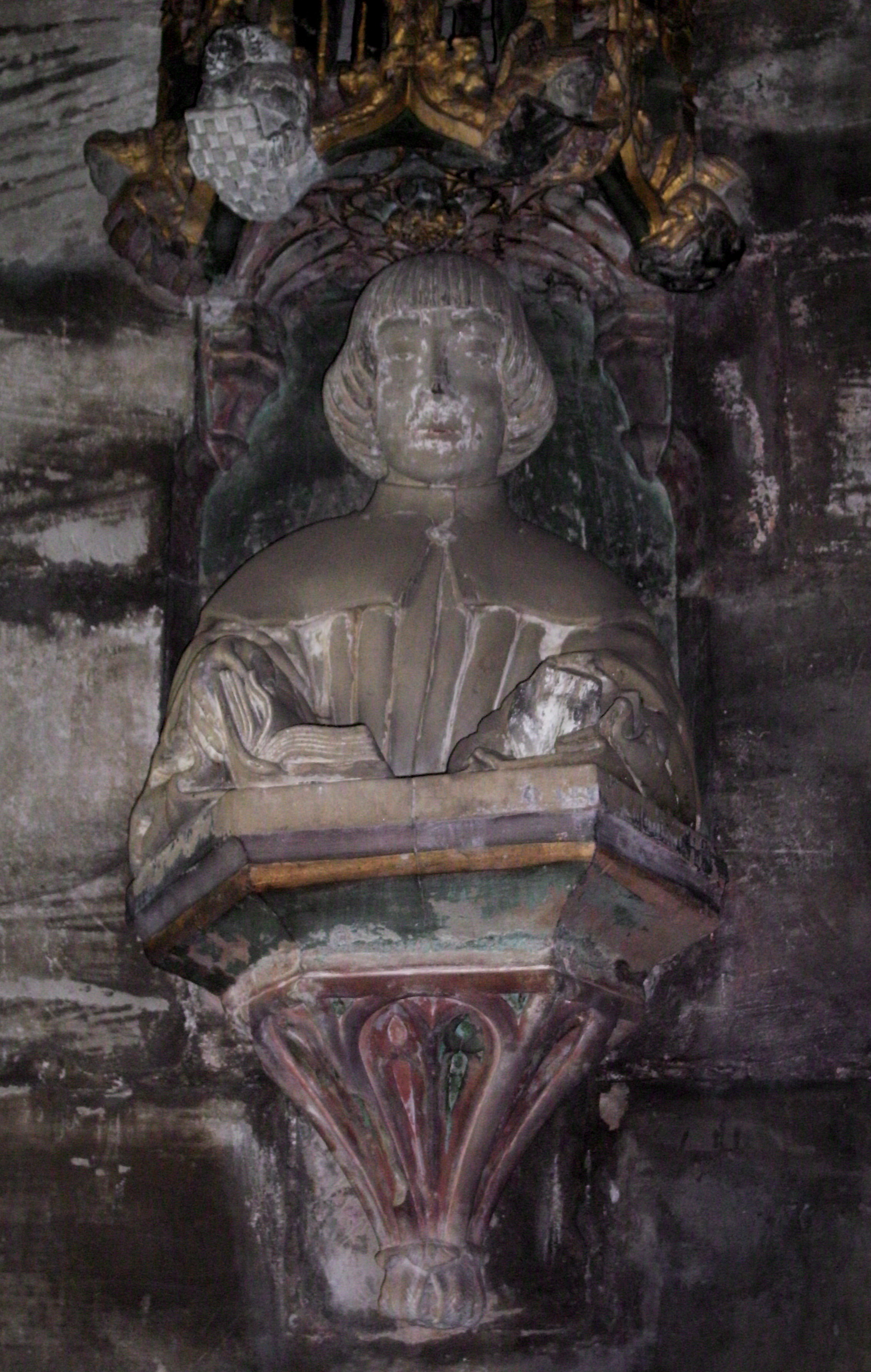
Memorial of Arthur Vernon, one of the children of Henry Vernon

Vernon married Lady Anne Talbot (died 1494), daughter of John Talbot, 2nd Earl of Shrewsbury. Among their children were:

- Roger Vernon, abducted and married against her will the heiress Margaret Kebell
- Richard Vernon (d. 1517), married Margaret Dymoke, daughter of Sir Robert Dymoke
- Thomas Vernon (d. 1556), married Anne Ludlow; his son Thomas was MP for Shropshire
- Humphrey Vernon (d. 1542), married Alice Ludlow
- Arthur Vernon (d. 1517), a priest
- John Vernon (d. 1545), married Ellen/Helen Montgomery, daughter of Sir John Montgomery
- Elizabeth Vernon (d. 1563), married Sir Robert Corbet
- Mary Vernon (d. 1525), married Sir Edward Aston
- Margaret Vernon
- Anne Vernon (d. by 1507), married Sir Ralph Shirley
- Alice Vernon

== Death and burial ==
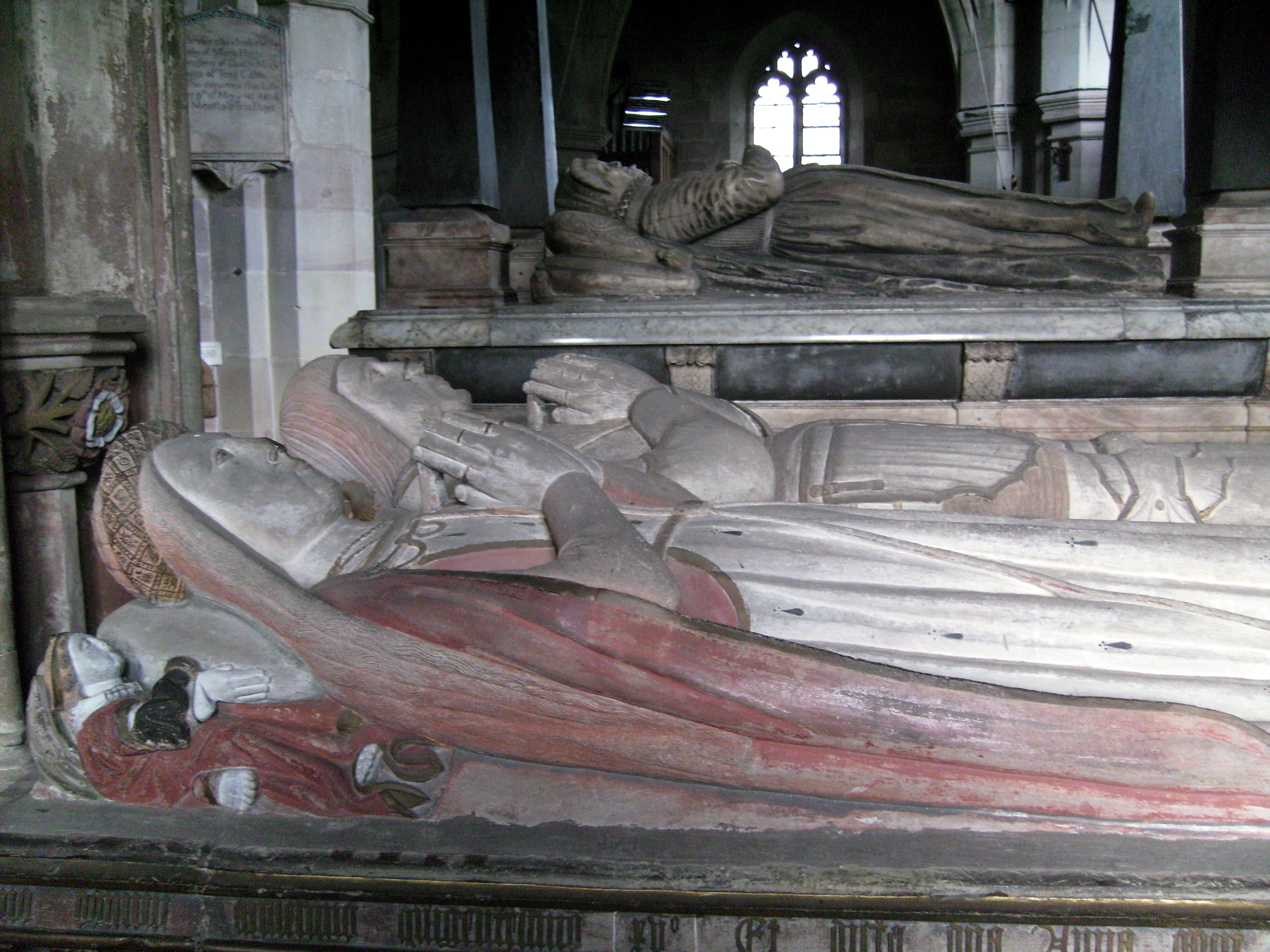
Tomb effigies of Henry Vernon and Anne Talbot

Vernon died on 13 April 1515 and was buried in St Bartholomew's Church, Tong, near many of his family members. His wife, Anne Talbot, had predeceased him in 1494. Their tomb effigies, unlike the others in the church, were of stone.
