= Vernon baronets of Hodnet (1660) =

Escutcheon of the Vernon baronets of Hodnet

The Vernon baronetcy, of Hodnet, Salop, was created in the Baronetage of England for Henry Vernon of Hodnet on 23 July 1660. He sat as a Member of Parliament for Andover, from 1641 to 1642, for Shropshire in 1660, and for West Looe from 1661 to 1676.

The 3rd Baronet was a diplomat, British envoy to Augustus II the Strong. The title became extinct in 1725, on his death.

== Vernon baronets of Hodnet, Salop. (1660) ==
- Sir Henry Vernon, 1st Baronet (1605–1676)
- Sir Thomas Vernon, 2nd Baronet (died 1683))
- Sir Richard Vernon, 3rd Baronet (1678–1725), diplomat, left no heir.
