= Sir Henry Vernon, 1st Baronet =

English politician

Sir Henry Vernon, 1st Baronet (1606–1676) was an English politician who sat in the House of Commons between 1660 and 1676.

Vernon was the son of Sir Robert Vernon of Hodnet, Shropshire and his wife Mary Needham, daughter of Sir Robert Needham, of Shavington.

In April 1641, Vernon was elected at a by-election as Member of Parliament for Andover in the Long Parliament. He voted against the attainder of Strafford, but was unseated on petition on 3 May 1642. He was appointed a commissioner for array by King Charles, but does not appear to have taken any part in the English Civil War and was therefore not disabled from sitting.

In 1660, Vernon was elected MP for Shropshire in the Convention Parliament. He was created a baronet in 1660. He was elected MP for West Looe for the Cavalier Parliament in 1661 and sat until his death in 1676.

Vernon married Elizabeth White daughter of Sir Richard White of the Friers in Anglesey. He was succeeded in the baronetcy by his son Sir Thomas Vernon, 2nd Baronet. His daughter, Elizabeth Vernon, married Thomas Cholmondeley (b. 1627).

Baronetage of England
| New creation | Baronet (of Hodnet); 1660–1676 | Succeeded by Thomas Vernon |
