= Vernon baronets of Shotwick Park (1914) =

Vernon of Shotwick Park arms: Or on a fesse azure between two crosses moline gules three garbs of the field

The Vernon baronetcy, of Shotwick Park in Cheshire, was created on 24 January 1914 in the Baronetage of the United Kingdom for William Vernon, head of the millers W. Vernon & Sons, owners of Millennium Mills (built 1905).

== Vernon baronets of Shotwick Park, Cheshire (1914) ==
- Sir William Vernon, 1st Baronet (1835–1919)
- Sir John Herbert Vernon, 2nd Baronet (1858–1933)
- Sir William Norman Herbert Vernon, 3rd Baronet (1890–1967)
- Sir Nigel John Douglas Vernon, 4th Baronet (1924–2007)
- Sir James Vernon, 5th Baronet (born 1949)

The heir apparent is the present holder's son George William Howard Vernon (born 1987).
