= Richard Vernon (speaker) =

English politician (died 1451)

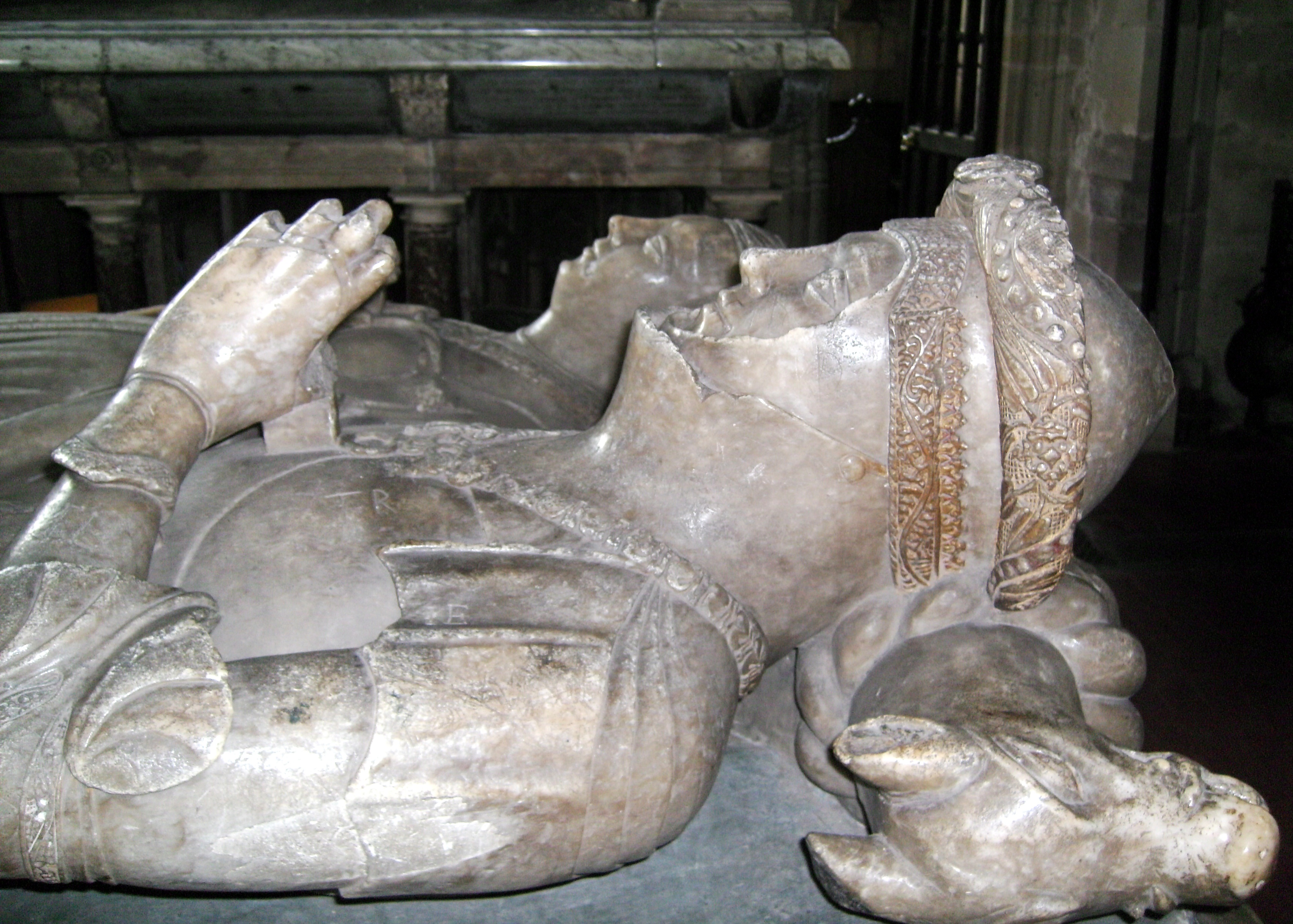
Effigy of Sir Richard Vernon. St Bartholomew's church, Tong, Shropshire.

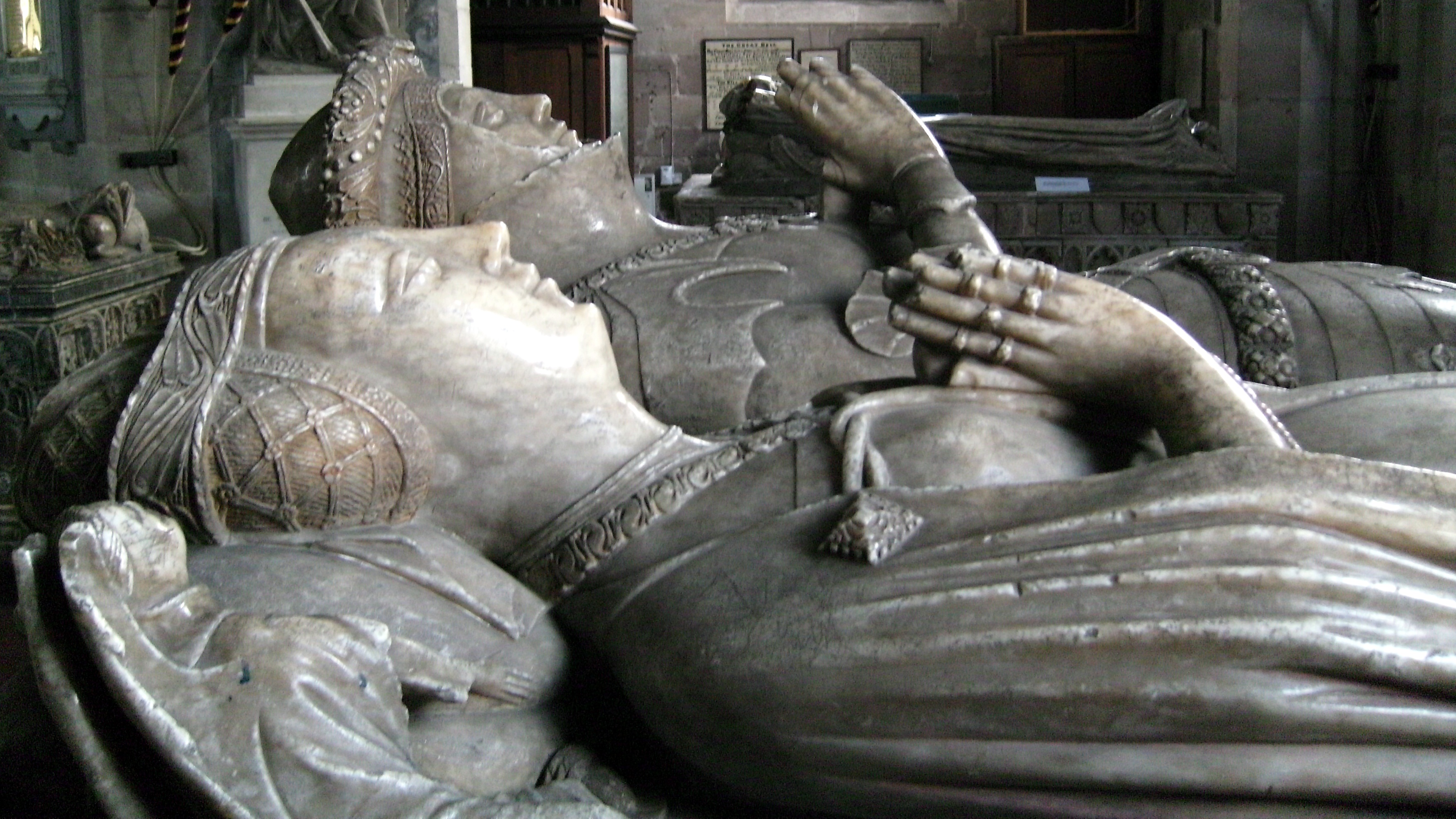
Effigy of Benedicta de Ludlow (foreground), Sir Richard's wife. St Bartholomew's church, Tong, Shropshire.

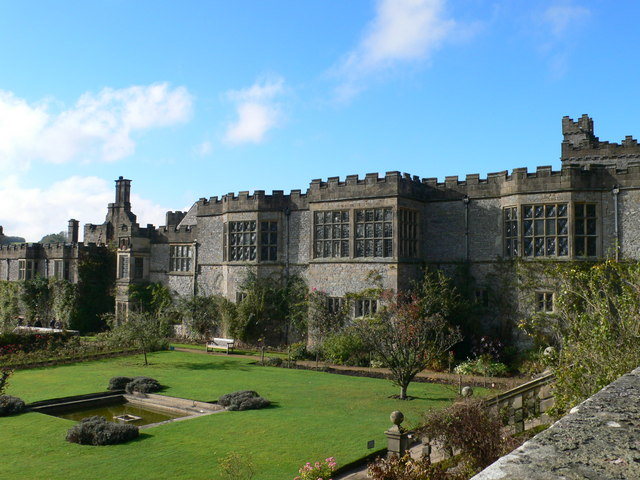
Haddon Hall, Derbyshire: photograph by Eirian Evans

Sir Richard Vernon (c. 1390 – 24 August 1451) was an English landowner, MP and speaker of the House of Commons.

== Background and early life ==
He was born into a long-established well-to-do family based at Haddon Hall in Derbyshire, the eldest son of Richard de Vernon (died 1400) and Joan verch Rhys (died 1439), daughter of Sir Rhys ap Gruffyd of Llansadwrn and Abermarlais, Carmarthenshire, and Wychnor, Staffordshire. His father died when he was ten years old, so he did not come into his estates until eleven years later. By this time he had already married Benedicta de Ludlow of Tong, Shropshire.

== Landowner ==
Vernon's property was widespread and varied. From his parents he inherited:

- In Cheshire the forestership of Macclesfield Forest, and the manors of Marpie and Wibersley.

- In Staffordshire estates around Draycott, Harlaston and Pipe Ridware.

- In Derbyshire estates around Bakewell, Baslow, Calver, Haddon, Netherseal and Rowsley

- In Pembrokeshire the manors of Stackpole Elidor (also known as Cheriton), Bosherston and Rudbaxton.

- In Carmarthenshire the manors of Pendine and Cantrewyn.

- In Buckinghamshire the manors of Pitchcott and Adstock, including advowsons of their churches.

- In Westmorland the manors of Meaburn Maulds and Newby, and there were also scattered lands in Cumberland.

In addition to this patrimony, the death of his paternal grandmother, Juliana de Pembrugge (Pembrook), brought him lands formerly belonging to her brother, Fulke de Pembrugge, who was also his wife's stepfather:

- In Shropshire the manor of Tong, together with Tong Castle.

- In Leicestershire the manor of Aylestone.

Sir Fulke's second wife, Isabel of Lingen, who was also Vernon's mother-in-law, had founded a chantry and college of a warden and four chaplains at Tong to pray for the souls of her three husbands. She bequeathed advowson of the church to Vernon, and also settled her manor of Haselbech, Northamptonshire, on him. In 1415, prior to launching his invasion of France, Henry V induced parliament to dissolve all alien priories: monastic houses subsidiary to abbeys in France. This included Lapley Priory, a small Benedictine house on the western edge of Staffordshire. Its lands were given to Tong college, greatly improving the income of the chaplains and putting the chantry on a much more secure footing. It is possible that this was brought about by a member of the House of Beaufort, the king's cousins, to whom Sir Fulke had been very close. Tong church was to become a shrine for the Vernon family, accommodating generations of elaborate tombs.

Vernon also tried to acquire the substantial estates of Sir Fulke's first wife, Margaret Trussell, which had been settled on Isabel for life. The legal wrangles with the Trussell family dragged on inconclusively for more than 20 years.

== Career ==
Vernon was advanced £45 10s. by the Exchequer in June 1416 to cover service in France, in which he was engaged for a few months. £40 a year was considered sufficient to support a knight, while £9 would pay an archer., so it is possible Vernon campaigned with a small force. If so, the most likely destination was Harfleur, where the English garrison was left stranded after the Agincourt campaign. The Armagnac besiegers were scattered in a daring relief operation, led by John of Lancaster, 1st Duke of Bedford on 15 August. This fits well with Vernon's subsequent career, as he must have returned to the Midlands by November.

In November 1416 Vernon was pricked High Sheriff of Staffordshire. That period of office was followed by a knighthood and he was appointed Justice of the Peace for Staffordshire, a post he held for five years. He was then chosen as one of the arbitrators in a dispute between the abbot of Burton Abbey and Thomas Okeover, a quarrelsome Derbyshire landowner and politician. He was twice appointed Sheriff of Nottinghamshire and Derbyshire, in 1425 and 1426, and was made High Sheriff of Staffordshire again in 1427.

Vernon became a member of Parliament for the first time in 1419, as a knight of the shire for Staffordshire. He was one of a number of Derbyshire magnates who were summoned early in 1420 to Westminster to discuss the defence of Normandy. His services to the Crown extended to advancing a loan of £52 10s, in concert with the Essex landowners, Sir William Coggeshall and Richard Baynard, who became Speaker the following year. 1421 marked the high point of Henry V's French campaigns, with Normandy under firm English control, the king wed to Catherine of Valois, the French king's daughter, and English forces pressing south and east of Paris. However, Henry died in 1422, leaving an infant son to succeed him. Vernon represented Derbyshire in the parliament of 1422, the first of Henry VI's reign. In the following year he was appointed steward of the Duchy of Lancaster's estates in the High Peak, Derbyshire.

He represented Derbyshire again in the parliament of 1426 and was elected Speaker of the House of Commons. The parliament met at Leicester Castle and was called the Parliament of Bats because members were forbidden to wear swords for fear of violence, and so carried clubs or bats. The key issue was the power struggle between the boy king's relatives, Cardinal Beaufort and Humphrey, Duke of Gloucester. Vernon had links with the Beauforts and their influence may have secured him the speakership, and possibly the stewardship of the High Peak. If this was so, he must have proved a disappointment, as the parliament largely favoured Gloucester. However, he was able to advance his own interests considerably. Ralph Neville, 2nd Earl of Westmorland was a minor and a ward of the king. He petitioned the House for an increased allowance and his request met with approval. Vernon was a tenant of the earl and also held the manor of Ashford-in-Bakewell, Derbyshire, at a farm of £42, during the minority of the earl, so he stood to gain from this measure. He was even delegated to handle the actual payments to Neville.

Vernon became involved in serious disturbances during the 1433 elections in Derbyshire. Henry, Lord Grey of Codnor, formerly a friend of Vernon, brought a force of 200 men to Derby on 24 June, intending to dictate the outcome of the election. Next day Vernon and Sir John Cokayne, a notoriously violent landowner from Ashbourne arrived with a much larger force and had themselves declared members of parliament. The clash became linked to a property dispute between Thomas Foljambe of Chesterfield, a client of Vernon, and Sir Henry Pierrepont of Holme Pierrepont Hall. Foljambe's retainers launched a murderous attack on Pierrpont and his men in Chesterfield Parish Church. Sessions of oyer and terminer were held at Derby in 1433 to investigate the affair. The first jury to sit was headed by Pierrepont himself and naturally held Foljambe responsible for the whole dispute. A second jury included Vernon and Cockayne, and was more sympathetic to Foljambe. Ultimately, no resolution was reached. Within four years, Vernon and Grey were on good terms again, engaged in joint enterprises. Vernon was elected in 1436 to represent Derbyshire in the parliament of 1437 without undue drama.

Powerful though he was, Vernon felt the need of backing from even more powerful magnates in times of conflict. From 1430 he was increasingly linked with Humphrey Stafford, who was to become Duke of Buckingham in 1444. In 1440, Vernon made a formal agreement with Stafford, agreeing to support him with a retinue of six mounted men. For this, he was to receive a life annuity of £20. The alliance fitted with Vernon's wider connections. Stafford was also loosely allied to the House of Beaufort and was to be crucial in the arrest and overthrow of Gloucester in 1447. The Stafford connection was to prove crucial in advancing Vernon's subsequent career. Stafford protected him against the growing tide of complaints about his maladministration and oppression in the High Peak. As Marcher Lord of Brecon, Stafford was also able to open up preferment for Vernon in South Wales, where he already had considerable interests.

Vernon was a deputy justiciar of south Wales (1431 – c. 1438) under James, Lord Audley, and during 1440–45 itinerant justice in the lordship of Brecon. By 1445 was serving as knight steward in the court of the Lord High Constable, another office occupied by Humphrey Stafford, now Duke of Buckingham, as well as in the court of the Earl Marshal (John de Mowbray, 3rd Duke of Norfolk), another magnate whom Vernon cultivated. In June 1450 he was appointed Sheriff of Pembroke, Llanstephan and St Clears for life. He also became constable of Pembroke Castle and Tenby Castle and secured numerous profitablee stewardships in the region. However, there were tensions between Vernon and his patrons, particularly as Buckingham was also allied with Sir William Trussell, with whom Vernon conducted a protracted and sometimes violent feud.

Buckingham had become constable of Calais by 1444, and he was undoubtedly responsible for Vernon's appointment as Treasurer of Calais in 1445 and as receiver and keeper of the Calais mint in the following year, posts he held until the year of his death. However they were a mixed blessing. As treasurer, Vernon ran up large debts, for which he was held personally responsible. On his death in August 1451, these passed to his eldest surviving son and successor, William, who had already succeeded him as treasurer. The Crown seized Harlaston as security and it seems that William never managed fully to meet his father's debts.

== Marriage and family ==
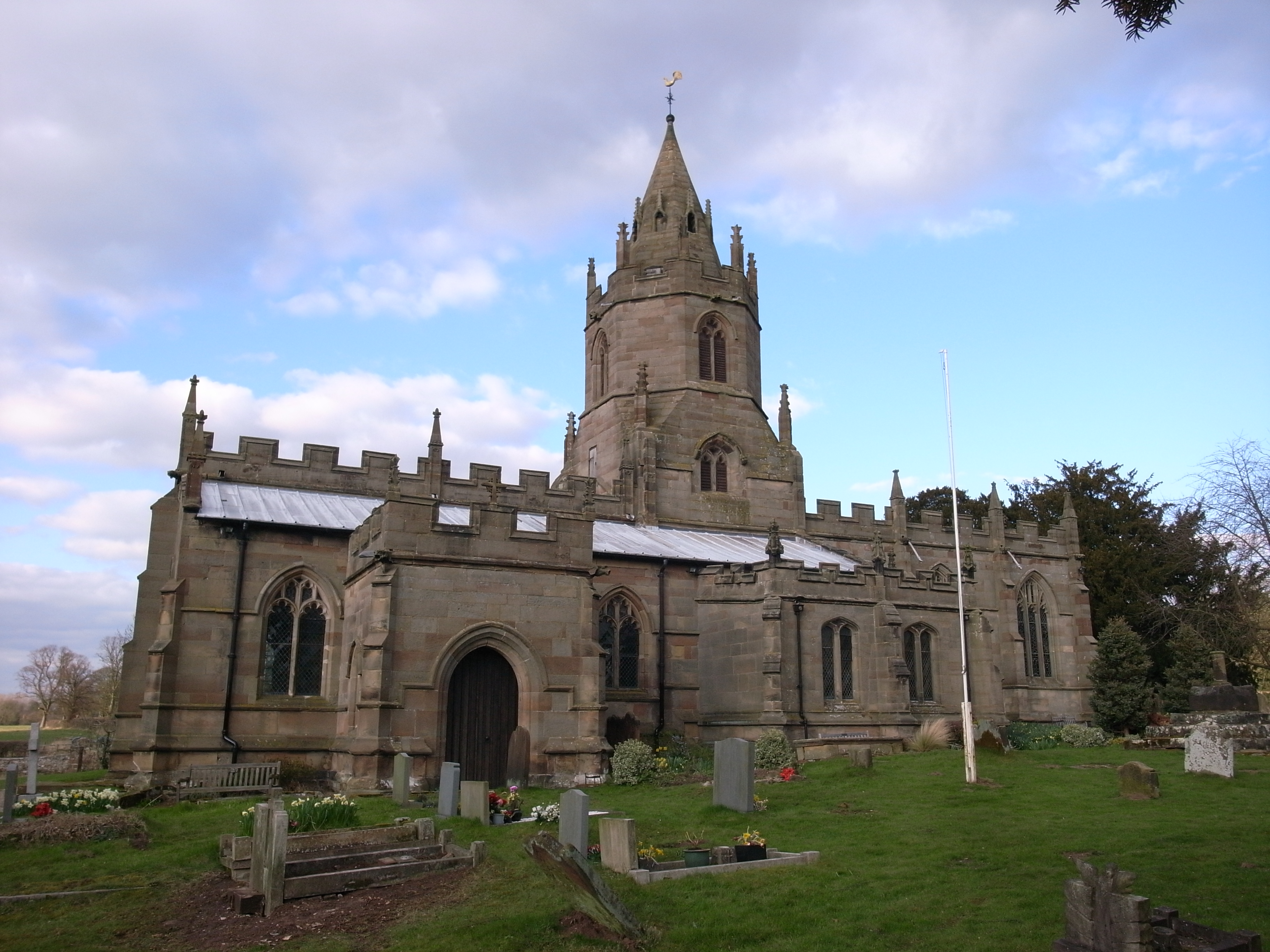
Tong Church

Richard Vernon married Benedicta (sometimes rendered Bennet) Ludlow. She was the daughter of Sir John Ludlow of Hodnet, Shropshire and Isabel de Lingen, the foundress of the chantry and college of Tong. They had at least four sons and four daughters. These include:

- Richard, Vernon's original heir, who predeceased him, and whose widow retained a large life interest in the Vernon estates.
- Sir William, his eldest surviving son, who inherited his main estates, some of his offices, and debts.
- Fulke, who was joint steward of High Peak with Vernon and captain of Mammes castle in the Calais pale.
- John, who became High Sheriff of Pembrokeshire.
- Elenor who married Sir Richard Wheelock of Cheshire, England
- Benedicta, who married Sir Thomas Charlton, soon to be Speaker.
- Elizabeth who married the Attorney General, John Vampage of Worcester (d.1446). She married secondly to Sir John Stanley of Elford; they had issue.
- Agnes, who married John Cockayne of Ashbourne.
- Margaret, who married Richard Longueville, and secondly Richard Ros.
- Ann, who married Sir John Bradbury
- Isabella, who married Nicholas III de Montgomery.

Political offices
Preceded by Sir Thomas Walton	Speaker of the House of Commons; 1426	Succeeded by Sir John Tyrell
