= Richard I de Vernon of Shipbrook =

Richard I de Vernon
- Lord of Shipbrook
- Noble family: Vernon family
- Father: Guillaume de Vernon

Richard I de Vernon, Lord of Shipbrook, was an 11th-century noble. He held lands within Cheshire and Norfolk in England as lord and tenant in chief. (Note: Lands held as shown in the 1086 Domesday survey: Ashton, Audlem, Bostock, Bredbury, Cogshall, Crewe, Davenham, [Higher and Lower] Shurlach, Hooton, Leftwich, Moulton, Picton, Shipbrook in Cheshire and Shropham and Snetterton in Norfolk.) Richard was succeeded by his son William.

== Biography ==
Richard’s younger brother Walter died without issue and he inherited some of Walter’s lands. He gave the tithes of Aston and Picton to the Abbey of St. Werburgh at Cheshire in 1093. He was created baron of Shipbrook by Hugh d'Avranches, Earl of Chester. Richard is sometimes confused with his contemporary Richard de Redvers, who was also known as Richard de Vernon and held Mosterton in Dorset in 1086.

== Bibliography ==
- Colburn, Henry (1839). A Genealogical and Heraldic Dictionary of the Peerage and Baronetage of the British Empire.
- This article incorporates text from a publication now in the public domain: "Vernon, Richard de (DNB00)". Dictionary of National Biography. London: Smith, Elder & Co. 1885–1900.
