= Treasurer of Calais =

The town of Calais, France, was in English hands from 1347 to 1558. During this historical period the task of the treasurer, in conjunction with the Captain of Calais, was keeping the defences in order, supplying victuals and paying the garrison. The treasurer was responsible for raising revenue from the Company of the Staple of Calais, which was required to contribute towards the expenses of defence.

The treasurer was a trusty servant of the Crown, which fostered the respect accorded to him by the garrison and officials as well as by those required to pay taxes to him, namely, merchants and burgesses. He acted on rare occasions as the delegate of the garrison in applying for their arrears of wages. The detailed functions of the treasurer remain unknown, but included the general supervision of the royal finances at Calais. He also was responsible for the letting of certain lands, and was empowered in conjunction with the captain to make appointments to unoccupied posts. The treasurer was a post of honour and several holders went on to hold great offices of state on their return to England, for example Sir Edward Wotton was nominated Administrator of the Kingdom during the minority of King Edward VI.

== List of treasurers of Calais ==
- Thomas de Brantingham, 1361–1368
- Sir William Armyn, 1385
- Roger Walden, 1387
- Robert Folkingham (died 1394), 1393–1394
- Richard Selby (died by November 1450), 1394-
- Thomas Stanley, prior to 1401
- John Bernard, prior to 1401
- Robert Thorley March 1403 – October 1404
- Thomas Neville, 5th. Baron Furnivall (died 1407), 1404–1406
- Robert Thorley, Easter 1406 – March 1407
- John de Langton, 1442–1445
- Sir Richard Vernon (1391- ), 1444–1450 (Resigned in favour of son Sir William Vernon)
- Sir William Vernon (1418–1467), 1450- (Succeeded father Sir Richard Vernon as Treasurer)
- Gervase Clifton, 1450–1460
- Sir Thomas Blount, -1459
- Walter Blount, 1st Baron Mountjoy (died 1474) 1460–1461 (Succeeded his father, Sir Thomas Blount, as treasurer of Calais in 1460, becoming governor a year later)
- William Slyfield, 1481–1485 (of Slyfield Manor, Great Bookham, Surrey)
- Thomas Thwaites (died 1503), 1483–1490
- Sir Richard Nanfant, temp. Henry VII
- Sir John Turberville (Turbrevyle, Turbervyle, Trobeville, et al.), temp. Henry VII
- Sir Hugh Conway, 1504–1517
- William Sandys, 1st Baron Sandys, July 1523
- Sir Richard Weston (died 1541), 1525–1528
- Sir Edward Wotton (1489–1551), 1540–1547 (Brother of Nicholas Wotton (died 1567)
- Sir Maurice Denys (died 1563), December 1548 – August 1553
- Sir Thomas Cornwallis, last Treasurer of Calais, April 1554 – December 1557.

== Sources ==
- Nichols, John Gough, The Chronicle of Calais from the Reigns of Henry VII and Henry VIII to the year 1540, London, 1846
- Sandeman, G.A.C., Calais Under English Rule, Oxford, 1908
- Grummitt, D., The Financial Administration of Calais during the reign of Henry IV, 1399-1413, English Historical Review, 133 (1988) pp. 277–299
