= William Vernon (died 1467) =

Member of the Parliament of England

- Vernon of Haddon arms
- Born: c. 1418/1419
- Died: 30 June 1467
- Noble family: Vernon
- Spouse: Margaret Swynfen
- Father: Richard Vernon
- Mother: Benedicta Ludlow

Sir William Vernon of Haddon (c. 1418/1419 – 30 June 1467) was an English landowner, politician, and soldier who held the posts of Treasurer of Calais and Knight-Constable of England.

== Family ==
William Vernon was born into a wealthy gentry family, very prominent in Cheshire and Derbyshire. His father, Sir Richard Vernon, was Speaker of the House of Commons and Treasurer of Calais. His mother, Benedicta, was the daughter of Sir John Ludlow of Hodnet, Shropshire. As the second son, he was not the original heir, but his elder brother predeceased their father.

== Career ==
Vernon represented Derbyshire in Parliament in 1442, 1449–50, and 1450-51. He assumed the position of Treasurer of Calais in 1450, his father having resigned the position in his favour. That same year, he was engaged in suppressing Jack Cade's Rebellion.

Vernon's highest position was Knight-Constable of England. This position, not to be confused with the Lord High Constable of England, would have allowed Vernon to command the nation's army in the king's absence and to hold the Constable Court. This position was described as having "cognizance of contracts touching deeds of arms and of war out of the realm, and also of things which touch war within the realm, which cannot be determined or discussed by common law." Vernon, who was granted the office for life, was the last individual to hold the office, as it was considered too powerful for a subject to hold.

He returned to Parliament representing Staffordshire in 1455-56, and possibly 1459, then Derbyshire in 1467.

== Marriage and children ==
Vernon married Margaret, daughter of Sir William Swynfen of Pipe. Her identity has been often confused, with various sources noting her as "daughter and heiress of Sir Robert Pype"; while she was an heiress of Pype, she was not his daughter, as her relation to the Pypes was through her paternal grandmother. They had seven sons and five daughters. The eldest son, Henry, became a powerful figure in his own right, as Controller of the household to Arthur, Prince of Wales.

== Death ==
Vernon wrote his will in June 1467, and died on the 30th of that month. He was buried in St Bartholomew's Church, Tong, Shropshire, near many others of his family.
