= List of licences to crenellate =

The following is a list of licences to crenellate, surviving in the records, issued from the 12th to 16th centuries, which was compiled by the amateur historian Philip Davis and published in the Castle Studies Group Journal. A few supposed licences sometimes quoted in other sources were questioned by Davis as dubious, deemed forgeries or were rejected entirely, but were still included in his list suitably qualified. The ultimate source for the licences is the patent rolls, the contemporary chronological official records made of all letters patent issued by English monarchs, and published in modern times as "calendars of the patent rolls preserved in the Public Record Office".

== Abbreviations ==
- (D) dubious
- (F) forgeries
- (R) rejected
- (P) pardons, being in effect retrospective licences
- (C) confirmations

== 1100s ==
- 1127 Jan, Archbishop William of Rochester (Rochester Castle). William de Corbeil, Archbishop of Canterbury.
- (F)1135-40 Abbas Sancti Augustini (St Augustine's Abbey). Either St Augustine's Abbey, Bristol, founded 1140, or St Augustine's Abbey, Canterbury; (a forgery)
- 1141 July, Com Gaufredo Essexiae super Luiam ("on the River Lee") (South Mymms Castle)?. Geoffrey de Mandeville, 1st Earl of Essex.
- 1141 July, Com Gaufredo Essexiae unum castellum ubicumque voluerit in terra sua ("a castle anywhere he wishes in his lands"). Geoffrey de Mandeville, 1st Earl of Essex
- 1142, William, Earl of Lincoln, Gainsborough (Castle Hills, Thonock, Gainsborough, Lincolnshire). William d'Aubigny, 1st Earl of Lincoln and 1st Earl of Arundel
- (D)1143 Roger de Conyers, Bishopton Castle Hill (a supposed licence issued by the Palatinate of Durham)
- 1146 Rannulfum comitem Cestr., tower in Lincoln Castle. Ranulf de Gernon, 4th Earl of Chester.
- 1153, Rodberto filio Hard(ingi); Betthone (Berkelai) (Robert Fitzharding, Berkeley Castle)
- 1166-1180, William de Mandeville, Pleshey Castle. William de Mandeville, 3rd Earl of Essex
- 1194 Ricardo de Vernone, Heddon (Haddon Hall); Licence to build un-crenellated wall
- 1195, Hugh de Say, Bleddfa Castle, Llangunllo, Powys, Wales.
- 1199, Richard Malebisse, Queldric [Wheldrake], Storwood, Yorks.; revoked

== 1200s ==
- 1200, William Briwerr, "in whichever Devon property he wishes" (?Axminster,? Buckland Brewer etc.). William Brewer.
- 1200, William Briwerr, Esleg (Ashley Castle (alias Gains Castle), Ashley, Hants.)
- 1200, Bishop Geoffrey Muschamp, Eccleshall Castle, Geoffrey de Muschamp, Bishop of Coventry.
- 1200/1, Henry son of Hervey son of Acaris, Cudereston (Cotherstone Castle, Durham). Henry FitzHervey.
- (D)1200, William Briwerr, Stoke (Stokebridge), dubious
- 1201, Hugh de Morville, Kirkoswald Castle, Cumbria. Hugh de Morville, Lord of Westmorland
- 1201, Alan de Hertiland, Hartland Castle. Hartland, Devon
- 1201, William d'Estoteville, Bossal (Buttercrambe Castle, N. Yorks.)
- 1201, William d'Estoteville, Totingham (Baynard Castle, Cottingham, Yorks.) William de Stuteville
- 1203, Belvoir Castle, Leicestershire
- 1204 May 27, Thom. de Burgo, Leleshay (Lindsey Castle (alias The Mounts), Babergh, Suffolk; Thomas de Burgh.
- 1215, Burgesses, Stafford Town (Borough Charter)
- 1221, Fulk FitzWarin, Whittington Castle, Shropshire
- 1227 Jan 30, New Sarum "Richard, bishop of the same place, to his successors, to the canons of this church, and to their men" (Salisbury City Defences). Richard Poore, Bishop of Salisbury
- 1227 Feb 13, Burgesses, Mungumery (Montgomery Town Defences)
- 1227 Aug 17, Henrico de Aldithele, Radeclif (Red Castle, Hawkstone, Shropshire). Henry de Audley.
- (P)1229 July 29, Mauritio de Gaunt, Beverestan (Beverstone Castle); Pardon. Maurice de Gaunt.
- 1230/31, Will. de Cavereswelle, Cavereswelle (Caverswall Castle, Staffordshire)
- 1230 Nov 28, H. de Burgo, comiti Kancie et Marga-rete uxori sue, Hatheleg; Hadleg (Hadleigh Castle). "to Hubert de Burgh, 1st Earl of Kent and to Margaret his wife"
- 1231 May 21, Roberto de Tatteshal, (?Tattershall Castle, East Lindsey, Lincolnshire?)
- 1235 Jan 19, William Earl de Ferrers, Leverepul (Liverpool Castle) (permission to strengthen his castle). William de Ferrers, 4th Earl of Derby
- 1252-3, Norwici (Norwich City Wall)
- 1252 Feb 21, Burgessess, Gannoc (Degannwy Town)
- 1253 July 5, Richard, Earl of Cornwall, on the hill above his manor of Mere (Castle Hill, Mere, Wiltshire). Richard, 1st Earl of Cornwall
- 1257 Dec 12, Adomar Winton, the king's brother, Insulam de Portand (Rufus Castle, Isle of Portland); Aymer de Valence
- 1258 Nov 4, Johannes Maunsell, Thesaurarius Ebor Seggewik (Sedgwick Castle, Sedgwick, West Sussex). John Maunsell, Treasurer of York.
- 1259 Feb 7, Richardus de Clare, Comes Gouc. et Hertford, Portlaund (Isle of Portland). Richard de Clare, 6th Earl of Gloucester and 5th Earl of Hertford.
- 1259 Nov 7, Richard de Clare, Manhale (Manhale, Saffron Walden, Essex)
- 1259 Nov 7, Richard de Clare, Southwaude (Southwold Castle, Suffolk)
- 1259 Dec 19, Richard de Clare, Suwald (Southwold Town Defences, Suffolk)
- 1259 Dec 20, Richard (de Clare), Tonebrugg (Tonbridge Town Defences)
- 1260 Dec 18, Marmaducus, filius Galfri, Horden (Horden Hall, Horden, Durham). Marmaduke FitzGeoffrey
- 1261 Aug 14, Robert de Sancto Johanne, Basing (Basing House, Basingstoke, Hampshire). Robert St John.
- 1261 Sep 28, Burgesses Gernemuth (Great Yarmouth Town Wall)
- 1262 Feb 5, Roger de Sancto Johanne, Lageham in Walkested (Lagham Manor). Roger St John.
- 1262 Mar 15, Johannes Mannsell, Thesaurarius Ebor Seggewik [Seggewyk] (Sedgwick Castle). John Maunsell, treasurer of York.
- 1262 Aug 16, Robert de Twenge. His house at Bergh (Bergh Castle)
- 1264 Feb 22 Robert Aguylon, Percinges (Perching Manor House)
- 1264 Feb 23 Ralph de Bakepuz, Ceddre (Cheddar Palace)
- 1264 Feb 28 Ricardus Foliot, Grymeston (Jordon Castle, Wellow). Richard Foliot
- 1264 Feb 28 Ellis de Rabayn, Waylim
- (C)1264 March 9 Ricardus Foliot, Grimestone (Jordan Castle, Wellow). Confirmation
- 1264 March 16 Robert Aguilun, Porting'es' (Perching Manor House)
- 1264 March 16 Rogerus de Summary, Welegh. (Weoley Castle)
- 1264 March 16 Rogerus de Summary, Duddeleg (Dudley Castle)
- 1264 Aug 20 Johannes de Eyvill, La Hode (Hood Castle)
- 1266 April 9 Henricus Husee, Hertinge (Harting Moat)
- 1266 Oct 22 Warinus de Bassingburn, Esteleye (Astley Castle)
- 1266 Oct 22 Warinus de Bassingburn, Bassingburn (Bassingbourne)
- 1267 Feb 7 Robert de Ros de Beverlac, Belver (Belvoir Castle)
- 1267 Feb 25 William le Moyne, Ogre (Moigne Court, Owermoigne); Licence to build uncrenellated wall
- 1267 Dec 5 Johannes Cumyn, Tyrsete (Tarset Castle)
- 1268 Bishop Godfrey Giffard (Hartlebury Castle); Not enrolled in Patent Rolls.
- 1268 Feb 8 Robertus Aguylum, Perting [Percinges] (Perching Manor House)
- 1269 Nov 22 Robertus Aguillu, Adington (Addington Castle Hill)
- 1270 July 25 Thomas de Furnivall, Shefeld. (Sheffield Castle)
- 1271 Jan 17 Stephanus de Penecestr, Hevre (Hever Castle)
- 1271 June 9 Willielmus Belet, Marham (Marham Castle)
- 1271 Oct 20 Godfrey, Bishop of Worcester, houses within his close of Worcester (Bishops Palace, Worcester)
- 1271 Oct 20 Godfrey, Bishop of Worcester, Widindon (Withington)
- 1272 March 1 W(illiam). Archbishop of York, Cawode (Cawood castle)
- 1275 Nov 7 Willielmus de Cavereswell, Cavereswell (Caverswall Castle)
- 1276 May 8 Hugo Episcopus Elien Ditton (Biggin Abbey Bishops Palace)
- 1276 May 15 Johannes Bek, Eresby (Eresby Manor) Revoked
- 1276 Aug 6 Johannes Bek, Eresby (Eresby Manor)
- 1277 Dec 28 burgesses, Lanbadar (Aberystwyth town)
- 1281 May 23 Antonius Bek, Somerton (Somerton Castle, Lincolnshire)
- 1281 May 25 Stephanus de Penecestre et Margareta uxor eius Alinton (Allington Castle). "Stephen de Penecestre and Margaret his wife".
- 1281 Aug 2 Baldewinus Wake, Styventon [Stiventon] (Stevington Castle)
- 1284 Jan 28 Robertus Burnell, Episcopus Bathon, et Wellen. Acton Burnell (Acton Burnell Castle). Robert Burnell, Bishop of Bath & Wells.
- (D)1284 Nov 24 Walter Hackelutel, castle in Elvayl Huchmenyt (Aberedw Castle) (dubious)
- 1285 Jan 1 Th. Episcopus Meneven (Thomas Bishop of St David's), Plesele (Pleasley)
- 1285 May 8 Dean and Chapter Lincoln Cathedral Close
- 1286 March 15 Robert, Bishop of Bath and Wells, cathedral church of Wells and the precinct (Wells Cathedral Precinct)
- 1290 Aug 28 Willielmus le Vavasour, Heselwode (Hazlewood Castle, Aberford)
- 1290 Oct 30 Petrus Episcopus Exon., his Exeter house (Exeter Episcopal Palace and Cathedral Close). Peter, Bishop of Exeter.
- 1291 Sept 20 Brianus filius Alani, Kilwardeby (Killerby Castle). Brian FitzAlan.
- 1291 Oct 19 Laurenc. de Ludelawe, [Lodelawe] Stoke-say [Stok Say] (Stokesay Castle)
- 1291 Nov 11 Johannes, Archiepiscopus Ebor. Parva Cumpton (Little Compton). John, Bishop of York.
- 1292 May 3 Willielmus de Grandisono, Asperton (Ashperton Castle). William de Grandison.
- 1292 June 20 Willielmus de Bello Campo, Comes Warr. (William de Beauchamp, Earl of Warwick)Hamslape (Castle Thorpe)
- 1292 Dec 28 Gwyschardus de Charrum, Horton (Horton Castle, Blyth)
- 1293 Feb 22 Robertus de Percy, Sutton (St Lois)Duplicate entry Feb 23
- 1293 Feb 22 Robertus de Percy, Boulton (Bolton Percy)
- 1293 June 15 Hugo de Frene, Mockes (Moccas Castle)
- 1293 June 21 Edmundus, Frater Regis le Sauvey (Peter brother of the king, Savoy Palace)
- 1294 April 20 Rogerus le Bigod, Comes Norff., Bungeye (Bungay Castle). Roger Bigod, Earl of Norfolk.
- 1294 May 11 Johannes de Cokefeld, Melton (Stonehall Manor, Moulton)
- 1294 Dec 6 Abbas de Hales [abbot and convent] Hales (Halesowen).
- 1295 Aug 10 Ricardus de Peulesdon, Warandashale (?Wardale)
- 1296 Sept 5 Prior et Conventus de Tynemuth Tynemuth (Tynemouth Priory)
- 1298 Aug 21 Johannes de Cadamo, domos suas quas habet infra clausum Ebor. ecclesi ("John of Caen, his house which he hold within the close of York Church"), York Cathedral Close)
- 1299 April 20 W. Coventr. et Lych., Episcopus Lichefeld (Lichfield Cathedral Close). W, Bishop of Lichfield.
- 1299 Aug 8 Johannes de Wylington, Yate (Yate Court), Glos.
- (D)Late C13 John Gervase, Chideock Castle (dubious)

== 1300s ==
- 1300 Johannes de Hastings, Ansley Castle, Warwickshire
- 1301 Jan 1 W. Coventr. et Lych., Episcopus Thorp Watervill (Thorpe Waterville Castle)
- 1301 Feb 2 Johannes de Hastings, Filungeleye (Fillongley Castle Yard)
- 1301 March 19 Johannes de Segrave, Breteby (Bretby Castle)
- 1302 Feb 16 Willielmus de Hamelton, decanus ecclesiae Beati Petri Ebor., Ebor (York Deanery)
- 1303 Jan 30 Ranulpus de Fryskeneye, Friskeneye (Friskney Hall)
- 1303 Oct 20 Gerardus Salvayn, Herssewell in Spaldingmor. (Harswell, Everingham)
- 1304 Jan 30 Thomas le Latymer, Braybrok(Braybrooke Castle)
- 1304 June 9 Jacobus de la Plaunche, Haveresham (Haversham Manor)
- 1304 Nov 22 Johannes Lovel de Tichemersh, Tichemersh (Titchmarsh Castle)
- 1305 Feb 2 Johannes de Segrave, senior, Caluedon (Caludon Castle)
- 1305 April 5 Robertus de Reynes, Eydon (Aydon Castle)
- 1305 April 5 Robertus de Reynes, Shortflat (Shortflatt Tower)
- 1305 June 19 W. Covent. et Lych., Episcopus manso suo in parochia Sanctae Mariae (House in Parish of St. Mary atte Stronde, London)
- 1305 Oct 3 Willielmus Servat, civis et mercator (Citizen and merchant), London, Servats Tower, Bucklesbury (Servats Tower, London)
- 1306 Sept 10 The master and brethren of the Knights Templars, la Bruere (Temple Bruer Preceptory)
- 1306 Sept 16 Walterus de Langton, Coventr. et Lych., Episcopus, Asheby David (Castle Ashby, The Castle)
- 1306 Sept 16 Walterus de Langton, Coventr. et Lych., Episcopus, Beudesert (Beaudesert Hall)
- 1306 Sept 16 Walterus de Langton, Coventr. et Lych., Episcopus alibi per omnia loca quae idem episcopus habet in Anglia (or elsewhere in England, wherever he holds)
- 1307 April 24 Mathias de Monte Martini manse of Burn [Burne] (Westbourne)
- 1307 Aug 24 Ricardus le Brun, Drombogh (Drumburgh Castle)
- 1307 Aug 24 Willielmus de Dacre, Dunmalloght (Dunmalloght Pele)
- 1307 Aug 24 Robertus de Tylliol, Scaleby (Scaleby Castle)
- 1308 March 11 Johannes de Benstede, clericus, Eye, juxta Westmonaster. quod vocatur Rosemont (Eye next to Westminster, called "Rosemont")
- 1308 March 24 Robertus de Holand, Holand (Up Holland)
- 1308 April 1 Johannes Extraneus (John Lestrange), Medle (Myddle Castle)
- 1308 July 18 Abbas de Burgo Sancti Petri, Burgo Sancti Petri (Peterborough)
- 1308 Oct 4 Henricus de Percy, Petteworth (Petworth House)
- 1308 Oct 4 Henricus de Percy, Lekyngfeld (Leconfield Manor)
- 1308 Oct 4 Henricus de Percy, Spofford (Spofforth Castle)
- 1308 Oct 25 Abbas Sancti Augustini, Cantuar. Abbatiae Sancti Augustini, Cantuar (St Augustine's Abbey)
- 1309 (July) 16 Robert de (Clifford), Pendragon (Pendragon Castle); not enrolled
- 1309 (July) 16 Robert (Clifford), Brouham (Brougham Castle)
- 1309 Aug 1 Johanness de Hastang, Chebeseye (Chebsey)
- 1309 Dec 14 Willielmus de Grantson, Eton (Eaton Tregoz Big Field, Foy)
- 1310 Feb 28 Johannes de Merkyngfeld, Merkyngfeld (Markenfield Hall)
- 1310 July 16 Walterus de Maydenstan, vallettus regis (King's valet), Maydenstan (Maidstone)
- 1310 July 22 Johannes de Middelton, Neulond (Newland Tower)
- 1310 July 22 Rogerus Maudut, Esshete [Essetete] (Eshott Castle)
- 1310 Aug 26 Willielmus de Bliburgh, clericus, Bromle (Simpsons Moat, Bromley)
- 1310 Oct 3 Nicholaus de Segrave, Barton (Barton Seagrave Castle)
- 1311 Feb 9 Willielmus le Wauton, Crumhale (Cromhall)
- 1311 April 2 Johannes de Sandale, clericus, Whetele (Wheatley Hall)
- 1311 May 28 Nicholaus de Sancto Mauro (Nicholas Seymour) Eton Meysi (Castle Eaton)
- 1311 June 1 Alexander de Bykenore, clericus Ruardyn (Ruardean), Forest of Dene
- 1311 Jun 17 Robertus de Holland, Meleburn (Melbourne Castle)
- 1311 Sept 29 Hugo le Despenser, the Elder, all his dwelling-houses and chambers in his manors throughout the realm
- 1311 Nov 2 Johannes de Pelham, clericus, Silverstrete (Silver Street, London)
- 1311 Nov 2 Johannes de Pelham, clericus Distafflane (Distaff Lane, London)
- 1312 April 26 Henricus de Bello Monte (de Beaumont), Folkyngham (Folkingham Castle)
- 1312 Sept 7 Robertus Baynard, Magna Hautboys (Hautbois Castle)
- 1312 Sept 12 Johannes de Handlo, Borstall, juxta Brehull [Brill], (Boarstall Tower)
- 1313 July 19 Fulco de Payforer, Colwebrigge (Coldbridge Castle)
- 1313 Oct 20 Simon de Monte Acuto (de Montague) Yerdlyngton (Yarlington Manor), Somerset
- 1314 May 22 Johannes de Wengrave, civis London(iensis) (citizen of London)..."possit kernallare Bradstrete" (Bread Street or Broad Street, London)
- 1314 Sept 20 Henricus le Scrop, (Henry le Scrope), Fletham (Kirkby Fleetham Castle)
- 1314 Sept 24 John Marmion, (L'ermitage Tanfield, Magdalen Field)
- 1315 March 12 Ranulpus de Albo Monasterio (de Blancmuster or de Whitchurch)("made at the request of the venerable father W. bishop of Exeter") Inor/Ivor (Ennor Castle)
- 1315 May 3 Adomarus de Valencia, Comes Pembroch, (Earl of Pembroke), Bampton (Bampton Ham Court)
- 1315 May 28 Robertus de Keleseye, civis London(iensis), Westchepe (West Cheapside, London)
- 1315 Aug 28 Thomas, Comes Lancastriae, (Thomas, Earl of Lancaster), Dunstanburgh (Dunstanburgh Castle)
- 1315 Oct 6 Rogerus de Swynnerton, Swynnerton
- (R)1316 Alicia de Leyegrave, Torneston (Torweston Manor, Sampford Brett)
- 1316 Feb 24 Dean and Chapter of the Church of Lincoln, entire precinct of their church (Lincoln Cathedral Close)
- 1316 June 22 Adam le Bret (at the request of Alicia de Leyegrave), Torveston (Torweston Manor, Sampford Brett)
- 1316 Nov 17 Johannes de Cherleton, Cherleton (Charlton Castle)
- 1316 Nov 17 William de Morton, clerk, Dalileye (Dawley Castle)
- 1317 Sept 25 Galfridus Le Scrop, (Geoffrey le Scrope) Clifton super Yoram (Clifton Castle)
- 1317 Sept 26 Willielmus de Monte Acuto (de Montague) Kersington (Cassington Manor House)
- 1318 May 9 Henricus de Wylyngton, Culverden (Willington Court, Culverton)
- 1318 July 12 Hugo de Louthre (Hugh Lowther) Wythehope in Derwentefelles (Wythop Hall)
- 1318 July 12 Abbas et Conventus Beatae Mariae Ebor / Abbathiam Beatae Mariae (Abbot & Convent of York Abbey)
- 1318 July 15 Robertus de Holand, Baggeworth (Bagworth Manor)
- 1318 July 26 Ricardus de Luches, Chiselhampton (Camoys Court)
- 1318 Nov 4 Edmundus Bacon, Gresham (Gresham Castle)
- 1318 Nov 24 Godefridus de Alta Ripa,(de Hauterive, Dawtrey, Daltry, Hawtrey) Elslake in Craven / Estlake (Elslack Hall)
- 1318 Dec 6 Dean and chapter of St. Mary, Lincoln (Lincoln Cathedral Close)
- 1318 Dec 10 Edo. de Passeleye, La Mote (Iden Moat)
- 1319 Oct 16 Constantinus de Mortuo Mari,(Mortimer), Sculton (Scoulton Hall)
- 1321 March 12 Henricus de Bello Monte (de Beaumont), Consanguineus Regis ("Cousin of the King"), Whitewyk (Whitwick Castle)
- 1321 July 27 The burgesses and commonalty, Kyngeston on Hull (Kingston-upon-Hull Town Wall)
- 1322 Jan 22 Robertus Lewer, "dilectus valectus noster" ("Our favoured valet") Westbury, Sutht (Westbury Manor)
- 1322 March 13 Robertus de Leyburn, Aykhurst / Dykhurst (Hayes Castle)
- 1322 June 23 W. Episcopus Exon(iensis) (W. Bishop of Exeter), Exon(ia) (Bishops Palace, Exeter and Exeter Cathedral Close)
- 1322 July 14 Fulco Lestrannge / Lestraunge (Lestrange), Whitecherche (Blakemere Moat)
- (D)1325/6 house in Salisbury
- 1325 Sept 14 Johannes de Cherleton, domum suam in villa de ... Salop ("his house in the town of..., Salop.), (Charlton House, Shrewsbury)
- (D)1327 Willielmus, Episcopus Norwich(iensis), palatium (Bishops Palace, Norwich)
- (C)1327 March 5 The burgesses Kingston-upon-Hull (Kingston-upon-Hull Town Wall), Confirmation
- 1327 March 6 Thomas Wake, dilectus consanguineus et fidelis noster ("Our favoured and faithful cousin"), Cotingham (Baynard Castle, Cottingham)
- 1327 June 18 Thomas West, Rugh Combe (Rugh Combe)
- 1327 June 23 Johannes de Patshull, Bletnesho (Bletsoe)
- 1327 July 10 Alanus de Cherleton, Wycheford (Withyford)
- 1327 July 10 Alanus de Cherleton, Appeleye (Apley Castle)
- 1327 Aug 31 Decanus et Capitulum Ecclesiae Beatae Mariae (Dean and Chapter of the Church of the Blessed Mary) at the request of our beloved chaplain, Walter de London, our almoner, Sarum (Salisbury Cathedral Close)
- 1327 Sept 26 Abbas et Conventus de Fourneys (Abbot and Convent of (Fotheray in) Fourneys (Piel Castle, Furness)
- 1327 Oct 7 Edmundus de Bereford, dilectus clericus noster (Our favoured priest), Langele (Langley)
- 1327 Oct 7 Johannes Wyard, dilectus vallettus noster ("Our favoured valet"), Staunton Harecourt (Stanton Wyard)
- 1327 Oct 23 Abbas et Conventus Sancti Benedicti de Hulm, St Benet Holme (St Benets Abbey, Holme)
- (R)1328 Ricardus de Merton, Torriton (Torrington Castle, Great Torrington)
- 1328 April 12 R. The Bishop, the Canons and the citizens of New Salisbury (Salisbury City Defences)
- 1328 Sept 16 Simon de Drayton, Drayton (Drayton House)
- 1329 Jan 25 Willielmus le Caleys (Galeys), Walle (Wall, Herefordshire)
- 1329 Jan 25 Robertus de Arden (Ardern), Perthyng (Perching Manor House)
- 1329 Jan 25 Robertus de Arden (Ardern) Dratton (Drayton)
- (P)1329 Aug 31 William de Montacute, Doneyate (Park Farm Moat, Donyatt), Pardon
- 1329 Sept 28 Episcopus Lincoln(iensis), palatium suum in civitate Lincoln (Bishops Palace, Lincoln)
- 1329 Sept 30 Thomas Tregoz, Dachesam (Dedisham)
- 1341 Date unclear John Pulteney, Cheveley (Cambridgeshire)
- 1341 Sir Robert Ogle Ogle Castle (Northumberland)
- 1344 Jan 27 Thomas de Heton Chevelyngham (Chillingham Castle, Northumberland)
- 1348 July 10 Abbas et Conventus de Whalleye Whalleye (Whalley Abbey, Lancashire)
- 1373 Nov 28 John Delamare, Nunney, Somerset (Nunney Castle)
- 1377 Dec 10 William Rede, Bishop of Chichester, Amberley Castle, West Sussex

== 1400s ==
- 1440 Oct 13, Laurence Hammerton, Helefeld (Hellifield Peel)
- 1441 Feb 5, Roger Fenys, Hurst Monceux (Herstmonceux Castle)
- 1442 May 5, John de Cartyngton, Cartyngton (Cartington Castle)
- 1443 July 7, Andrew Ogard, knight, John Clyfton, knight, John Fastoff, knight and William Oldehall, knight, Robert Whityngham, esquire, and William Roys: Rye, otherwise called the Isle of Rye in Stanstead Abbots (Rye House, Stanstead Abbots)
- 1446 Nov 16, John Pury, Chambirehous (Chamberhouse)
- 1447 April 24, Thomas Daniell, king's squire, Ridon (Roydon Hall)
- 1447 May 26, Richard, Duke of York, Honesdon (Hunsdon House)
- 1447 Oct 28, Adam, Bishop of Chichester, Cakham (Cakeham Manor House)
- 1447 Oct 28, Adam, Bishop of Chichester, Alyngbourne (Aldingbourne)
- 1447 Oct 28, Adam, Bishop of Chichester, Amburley (Amberley Castle)
- 1447 Oct 28, Adam, Bishop of Chichester, Drungewyk (Drungewick Manor, Loxwood)
- 1447 Oct 28, Adam, Bishop of Chichester, Byxhill (Bexhill Manor House)
- 1447 Oct 28, Adam, Bishop of Chichester, Bruyll (Broyle Manor House)
- 1447 Oct 28, Adam, Bishop of Chichester, Ferrying (Ferring Manor House)
- 1447 Oct 28, Adam, Bishop of Chichester, Preston (Preston Manor House)
- 1447 Oct 28, Adam, Bishop of Chichester, Sellsey (Selsey Manor House)
- 1447 Oct 28, Adam, Bishop of Chichester, Tyryscherch (Turzes Manor House)
- 1447 Oct 28, Adam, bishop of Chichester, Sidlisham (Sidlesham Manor House)
- 1447 Oct 28, Adam, bishop of Chichester, Westwythtryng (West Wittering Manor House)
- 1448 Jan 20, John Norys, Yattingden, Wele and Firmsham (Yattendon Manor)
- 1448 Dec 10, Thomas Browne, king's squire, Tonford (Tonford Manor, Thanington Without)
- 1448 Dec 10, Thomas Browne, king's squire, Bettisworth (Betchworth Castle)
- 1448 Dec 10, Thomas Browne, king's squire, Egethorne (Eythorne, Kent)
- 1448 Dec 10, Thomas Browne, king's squire, Kyngesnoth (Kingsnorth, Kent)
- 1448 Dec 10, Thomas Browne, king's squire, Tonge (Tonge Castle, Kent)
- 1449 June 26, Robert Botyll, Prior of the Hospital of St. John of Jerusalem in England, Aycle (Eagle Preceptory)
- 1451 Mar 22, Thomas, Bishop of Bath and Wells, Wells (Wells Bishops Palace and Cathedral Close)
- 1457 Dec 7, John Wolf, Kentysbery (Kentisbury Barton)
- (P)1458 May 5, Ralph Botiller, knightt, lord of Sudeley, More (The More, Rickmansworth);Pardon
- (P)1458 May 5, Ralph Botiller, knt, lord of Sudeley, Sudeley (Sudeley);Pardon
- 1459 Dec 11, Thomas Fitz William, Malberthorpe (Mablethorpe)
- 1460 Sept 11, Richard Beauchamp, Estenore (Bronsil Castle)
- (P)1462, Alan [Adam] Morland, parson of the Church of Redmershulle, Redmershulle (Redmarshall Rectors Tower), Durham; Pardon
- (C)1462 Jan 20, Mayor and burgesses of Pole, Pole (Poole Town Wall);Confirmation
- (C)1462 July 1, Mayor, sheriffs and burgesses of the town of Kyngeston on Hull, (Kingston upon Hull Town Wall); Confirmation
- 1462 Sept 20, Thomas Gille, the younger, Esquire, Haicche Arundell (Hatch Manor House, Loddiswell)
- 1466 Oct 12, Thomas Cook, knight, Gydihall by Ramford (Gidea Hall)
- 1467 Jan 20, Henry Waver, knight, Thester Waver (Cesterover)
- 1469 May 2, Sir Thomas Pilkington, Bury (Bury Castle, Lancashire), Lancaster; licence
- 1469 July 3, Radulphus Wolseley, Wolseley (Wolseley Hall)
- 1470, Christopher Conyers, knight, Sokburn (Sockburn Castle); Durham licence
- 1473, William Verney, Fairfield House (Not enrolled)
- 1473 April 14, Richard Whetehille, esquire, Boughton (Boughton House)
- 1474 Feb 11, William Plompton, knight, Plompton (Plompton)
- 1474 April 17, William Hastynges, knight, lord of Hastynges, Assheby de la Zouche (Ashby De La Zouch Castle)
- 1474 April 17, William Hastynges, knight, lord of Hastynges Bagworth (Bagworth Manor), Bagworth and Thornton are probably the same place
- 1474 April 17, William Hastynges, knight, lord of Hastynges, Kerby (Kirby Muxloe Castle)
- 1474 April 17, William Hastynges, knight, lord of Hastynges, Slyngesby (Slingsby Castle)
- 1474 April 17, William Hastynges, knight, lord of Hastynges, Thorneton (Thornton, Leicestershire)As above
- 1474 May 28, Laurence, Bishop of Durham, Bryggecourt in the parish of Bateresey (Bridgecourt Manor, Battersea)
- 1477 March 5, John Holcot, esquire, Bradden (Bradden Manor)
- 1477 May 28, John Pylkington, knight, Turneham Hall (Thurnham Hall)
- 1477 May 28, John Pylkington, knight, Bradeley (Bradley Hall, Stainland)
- 1477 May 28, John Pylkington, knight, Elfletburgh (Elphaborough)
- 1477 May 28, John Pylkington, knight, Pylkyngton Hall (Pilkington in Wakefield)
- 1479 May 26, James Haryngton, knight, Farleton (Farleton Castle)
- 1479 May 26, James Haryngton, knight, Brereley (Brierley Hallsteads)
- 1479 Aug 15, Johannes Elrington, miles,(i.e. knight) Thesaurarius Hospitii Regis,(Treasurer of the Royal Hospital), Dixtherne (Great Dixter)
- 1479 Aug 15, Johannes Elrington, miles Thesaurarius Hospitii Regis, Udymere (Court Lodge, Udimore)
- 1480 July 14, William Gascoigne, knight, Gaukethorpe (Gawthorpe)
- 1482 July 3, Edmund Bedyngfeld, esquire, Oxburgh (Oxburgh Hall, Oxborough)
- (D)1483, Philippe de Carteret, St Ouen's Manor, Jersey, dubious
- (P)1484, John Kelyng, clerk, rector of the parish church of Houghton, Houghton le Spring Rectory; Durham Pardon
- 1487 Aug 10, Sir William Stanley, Hoton (Hooton Hall); Chester licence
- 1487 Oct 6, John Guldeford, knight, Brockle, parish of Crambroke (Brockley)
- 1487 Oct 6, John Guldeford, knight, Halden, parish of Rolvenden (Halden)
- 1487 Oct 6, John Guldeford, knight, Hertrigge, parish of Ebney (Hawridge)
- 1487 Oct 6, John Guldeford, knight, Tenterden, parish of Tenterden (Tenterden)
- 1487 Oct 6, Richard Guldeford, knight, Higham, alias Iham (Hiham)
- 1487 Oct 6, Richard Guldeford, knight, 'le Camber' (Camber), private coastal artillery fort
- 1490 Aug 2, Thomas Stanley, Earl of Derby, Green Hall in the parish of Garstang (Greenhalgh Castle);Lancaster licence
- 1491 Nov 8, Thomas, Earl of Ormonde, Newehall (New Hall, Boreham)
- 1495 Nov 5, Sir William Martyn, Adlampston in the parish of Pidelton (AthelhamptonHall)
- 1499 June 22, Richard Empson, Estneston (Easton Neston House)

== 1500s ==
- 1510 March 8, Robert Drury, Hausted Hall (Hawstead Hall)
- 1510 March 8, Robert Drury, Buknahams (Bokenhams, Bradenham)
- 1510 March 8, Robert Drury, Onhowshalle (Onehouse Hall)
- 1510 July 6, Edward, Duke of Buckingham, Thournebury (Thornbury Castle)
- 1512 Nov 8, John Spencer, Wormeleighton (Wormleighton Manor House)
- 1512 Nov 8, John Spencer, Olthorp (Althorp)
- 1515 June 30, Sir Peter Eggecombe, Estonehouse (Stonehouse Town Defences)
- (C)1523 June 20, James Denton the Dean, Lichfield Cathedral Close; Confirmation
- 1531 Jan 22, Sir William Paulet, Master of the King's Wards, Basyng (Basing House)
- 1533 Jan 30, Sir William FitzWilliam, Cowdray (Cowdray House)
- 1536 Sept 21, a fraternity of 22 named men upon a hill there adapted for signals (TynemouthSouthern Tower), a fortified light-house
- 1536 Sept 21, a fraternity of 22 named men on the north side of "le Shelys" at the entry of the port (Tynemouth Northern Tower), a fortified light-house
- (P)1542 Feb 18, Sir Thos. Wriothesley, one of the King's principal secretaries, Tychefeld (Titchfield); Pardon
- 1544 July 28, Sir Anthony Browne, K.G., Master of the Horse, within the site of the late mon. of Battle (Battle Abbey)
- 1546 Jan 31, Sir William Pagete, the King's Councillor, Burton (Burton Upon Trent Abbey)
- 1546 Jan 31, Sir William Pagete, the King's Councillor, Brysingote (Brizlincote Hall)
- (P)1547 Sept 20, William Paulett, K.G., Lrd Seynt John, Letley (Netley Castle); Pardon; (a private coastal artillery fort)
- (P)1551 Nov 20, William Petre, Ingat Stone alias Ging ad Petram (Ingatestone Hall); Pardon
- 1561 Nov 24, Christopher Heydon, knight, the queen's servant, Baconsthorpe (Baconsthorpe Castle)
- 1567 Oct 28, Lewis Grevell, Mylcote - Mountgrevell (Milcote Manor)
- 1589 June 5, Sir Moile Finche (Moyle Finch)Eastwell Manor
- (D)1622 March 10, Ferdinand Huddleston, Millom Castle, dubious

== Sources ==
- Davis, Philip (2006–2007), "English Licences to Crenellate: 1199-1567'" (PDF), The Castle Studies Group Journal, 20: 226–245
