= Listed buildings in Nether Haddon =

Nether Haddon is a civil parish in the Derbyshire Dales district of Derbyshire, England. The parish contains 15 listed buildings that are recorded in the National Heritage List for England. Of these, one is listed at Grade I, the highest of the three grades, one is at Grade II*, the middle grade, and the others are at Grade II, the lowest grade. The most important building in the parish is Haddon Hall, which is listed together with associated structures in the gardens and grounds. The River Wye and its tributary, River Lathkill, flow through the parish, and bridges crossing them are listed. The other listed buildings are a farmhouse and associated structures, a barn converted for residential use, and a milestone.

== Key ==
Grade	Criteria
I	Buildings of exceptional interest, sometimes considered to be internationally important
II*	Particularly important buildings of more than special interest
II	Buildings of national importance and special interest

== Buildings ==
Name and location	Photograph	Date	Notes	Grade
Haddon Hall; 53.19385°N 1.64974°W		14th century	A fortified manor house, incorporating earlier material, and later extended, particularly in the 15th century. It is in limestone and gritstone with gritstone dressings, quoins, embattled parapets with ridgeback copings and lead roofs. It is mainly in two storeys, with a four-storey northwest gate tower, and a three-storey Peveril Tower and north-east lodgings, and there is a double-courtyard plan. The entrance tower has steps leading up to a pointed arch with a moulded surround and hood mould. In the west courtyard is a chapel with Perpendicular windows. Elsewhere, there are mullioned and transomed windows, bay windows, oriel windows and lancets.	I
Stable block, Haddon Hall; 53.19415°N 1.65065°W		14th century	The stable block, later altered and used for other purposes, is in limestone and gritstone, with gritstone dressings, quoins and a stone slate roof. There are two storeys and three bays. In the centre is a segmental arch with moulded capitals, and jambs carved into the quoins, and above it is a carved stone. In the lower floor are buttresses, and vents, and in both floors are mullioned windows. On the east gable wall are external steps up to an upper floor doorway.	II
Terraces and steps, Haddon Hall; 53.19389°N 1.64885°W		16th century	To the southeast of the hall are four levels of terraces with walls of limestone and gritstone, and steps between the levels. The wall of the top terrace, dating from the early 17th century, has a balustrade, and central steps leading down. It consists of five-bay arcades of square rusticated balusters with semicircular arches between and projecting keystones, over which is a wide handrail linked by large rusticated piers, and surmounted by large ball finials. The lower walls are supported by buttresses.	II*
Pigeoncote, Haddon Hall; 53.19402°N 1.65385°W		1614	The pigeoncote in the grounds of the hall has a ground floor in limestone and an upper floor in gritstone, with gritstone dressings, moulded string courses, between the floors, quoins, and a pyramidal stone slate roof with lead flashings and a small cupola. There is a single bay, and a square plan. The building contains a doorway with a quoined surround and a dated lintel, and there is a two-light mullioned window on each side.	II
Dorothy Vernon's Bridge; 53.19309°N 1.64926°W		17th century	A packhorse bridge over the River Wye, it is in gritstone and limestone, and consists of two segmental arches with voussoirs. Between the arches are triangular-sectioned cutwaters, and above, the parapets are coped.	II
Gardener's Cottage, Haddon Hall; 53.19423°N 1.65088°W	—	17th century	The cottage, possibly with an earlier core, is in limestone with gritstone dressings, quoins, and a stone slate roof. There are two storeys and three bays. The central doorway has a chamfered surround, and is flanked by two-light mullioned windows. Above the doorway is a single-light window, and to the sides are dormers with coped gables and kneelers.	II
Main Bridge, Haddon Hall; 53.19366°N 1.65147°W		1663	The bridge carrying the entrance road to the hall over the River Wye is in gritstone. It consists of three stepped segmental arches with coped parapets, canted to the centre, and with the walls splayed at the ends. Between the arches are triangular-sectioned cutwaters rising to form refuges.	II
Conksbury Bridge; 53.18721°N 1.68448°W		Mid 18th century	The bridge carries Youlgrave Road over the River Lathkill, and is in limestone with gritstone dressings. The bridge curves, and has a central segmental arch with voussoirs and a keystone. On each side are smaller arches, and to the west is a large arch. The cutwaters to the north are pointed, and to the south they are rectangular and stepped. On the north side is a curved weir.	II
Old Fillyford Bridge; 53.18963°N 1.64112°W		Mid 18th century	The bridge, now disused, formerly carried a road over the River Wye. It is in limestone with gritstone dressings, and consists of three segmental arches. The bridge has voussoirs, triangular cutwaters, spandrels, and coped parapets.	II
Hawley Bridge; 53.18020°N 1.65519°W	—	1775	The bridge carries the B5056 road over the River Lathkill, and is in limestone and gritstone with gritstone dressings. The bridge consists of two segmental arches with voussoirs and spandrels. Between the arches are semicircular cutwaters, and the bridge has a datestone, and parapets, canted up towards the centre, with tooled semicircular copings.	II
Bowling Green Farmhouse, walls and steps 53.19712°N 1.64622°W	—	Early 19th century	The farmhouse is in gritstone on a plinth, with floor bands, an eaves band, and a slate roof behind parapets with ridgeback copings. There are two storeys and six bays. The doorway has a divided fanlight, and the windows are sashes. Attached to the house is a stepped garden wall with triangular-sectioned copings, and a flight of steps leads down from it. The steps have coped side walls and at each end are piers with banded ball finials.	II
Bridge over River Lathkill; 53.18792°N 1.64027°W		Early 19th century	The bridge carries Stantonhall Lane over the River Lathkill. It is in gritstone, and consists of a single segmental arch. The bridge is canted towards the centre, and has coped parapets.	II
Haddon Barn; 53.19252°N 1.65273°W	—	Early 19th century	A house and a barn, later combined into houses, it is in limestone and gritstone with gritstone dressings and a stone slate roof. There is a single storey and attics. On the south front is a doorway and a porch with decorative bargeboards. In the ground floor are sash windows, above the doorway is a full dormer, and this is flanked by five flat-roofed half-dormers. On the east and north fronts are mullioned and transomed windows.	II
Milestone; 53.19276°N 1.65293°W		Early 19th century	The milestone is on the southwest side of the A6 road. It consists of a stone with a triangular section and a sloping top. The top is inscribed with the distance to London, and on the sides are the distances to Bakewell, Buxton, Matlock and Derby.	II
Gatehouse, Haddon Hall; 53.19267°N 1.65195°W		Early 20th century	The gatehouse is in limestone and gritstone with quoins and a stone slate roof. There are two storeys and five bays. In the centre is a segmental arch with a moulded surround flanked by buttresses. The windows either have a single light, or are mullioned with two or three lights. In the archway are doorways with moulded surrounds and ogee heads.	II
