= Chapel of St Nicholas, Haddon Hall =

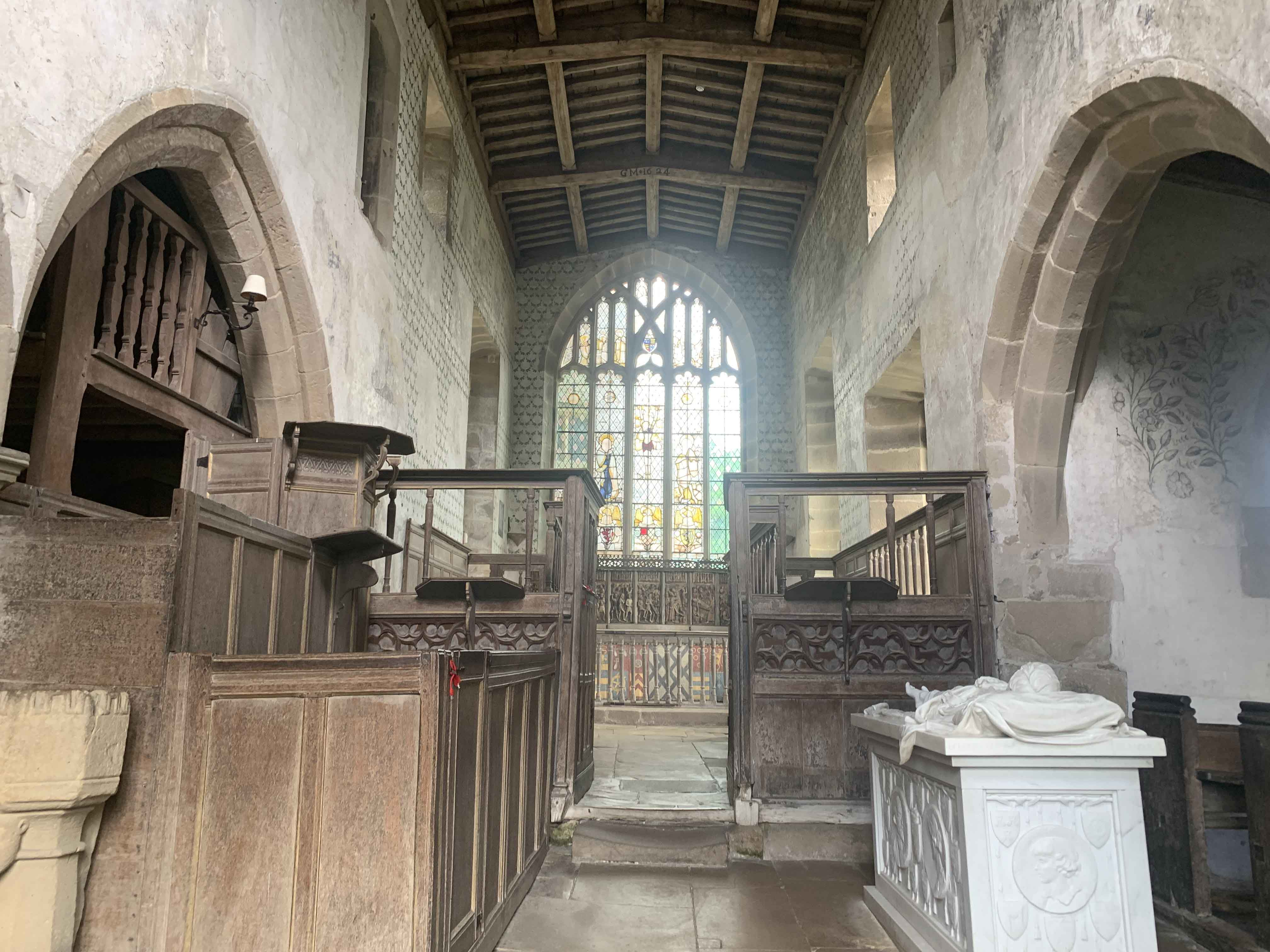
- Interior of St Nicholas Chapel, Haddon Hall
- Chapel of St Nicholas, Haddon Hall
- 53°11′37″N 1°38′59″W
- OS grid reference: SK 23504 66363
- Location: Haddon Hall, Derbyshire
- Country: England
- Denomination: Church of England

Architecture
- Heritage designation: Grade I listed
- Style: Norman, Early English

Administration
- Parish: Nether Haddon

The Chapel St John Nicholas, Haddon Hall is a Grade I listed Church of England chapel in Haddon Hall, Derbyshire. The chapel's origins are Norman, with later medieval additions. The chapel is noted for its extensive medieval wall paintings featuring scenes from the Bible, and medieval stained glass. Haddon Hall is regarded as one of the best-preserved fortified manor houses in England. It was listed Grade I in 1954. The chapel is the parish church of Nether Haddon, one of the smallest parishes in England.

== History ==
The Chapel of St. Nicholas at Haddon Hall has Norman origins, and originally served as the church for neighbouring villages. The present building was completed in 1427, during the reign of King Henry VI. Since 1567 the manor of Haddon Hall was home to the Manners family, Dukes of Rutland, who remain the owners to this day. The chapel boasts a rare series of medieval wall paintings, most likely commissioned in the early 15th century. The paintings were whitewashed during the Reformation, but became visible in the 19th century and were restored in the early 20th century.

Haddon Hall was unoccupied from the 1700s until the 1920s, after which it was extensively restored. The manor house and the chapel are popular shooting locations for film and television, including Pride and Prejudice (2005), Elizabeth (1999), and Jane Eyre (1996).

== Today ==
Today St Nicholas' Chapel is the parish church of Nether Haddon, one of the smallest parishes in England.

== See also ==
- Grade I listed buildings in Derbyshire
- Haddon Hall, Derbyshire

== Gallery ==
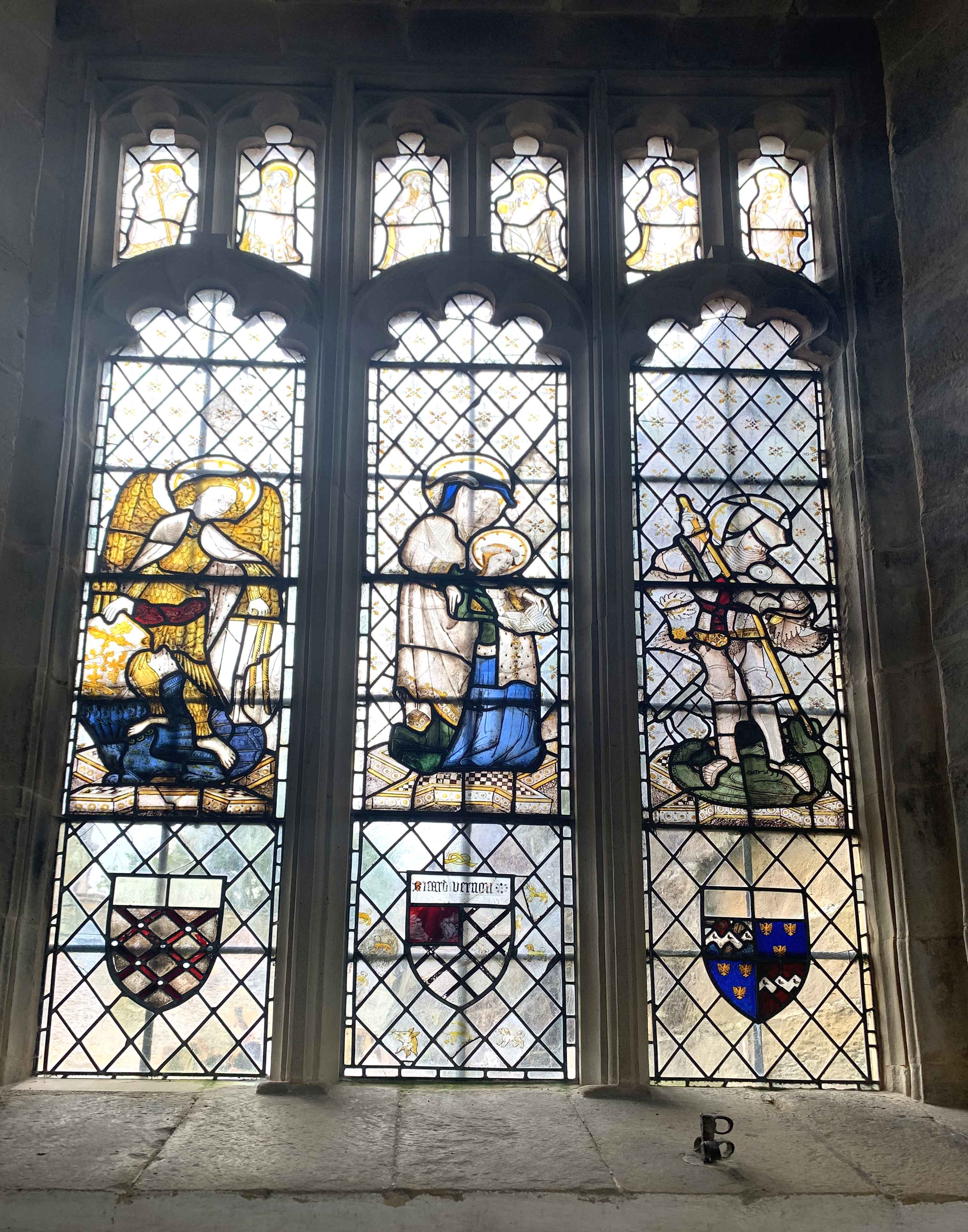
Medieval Glass at Nicholas Chapel, Haddon Hall

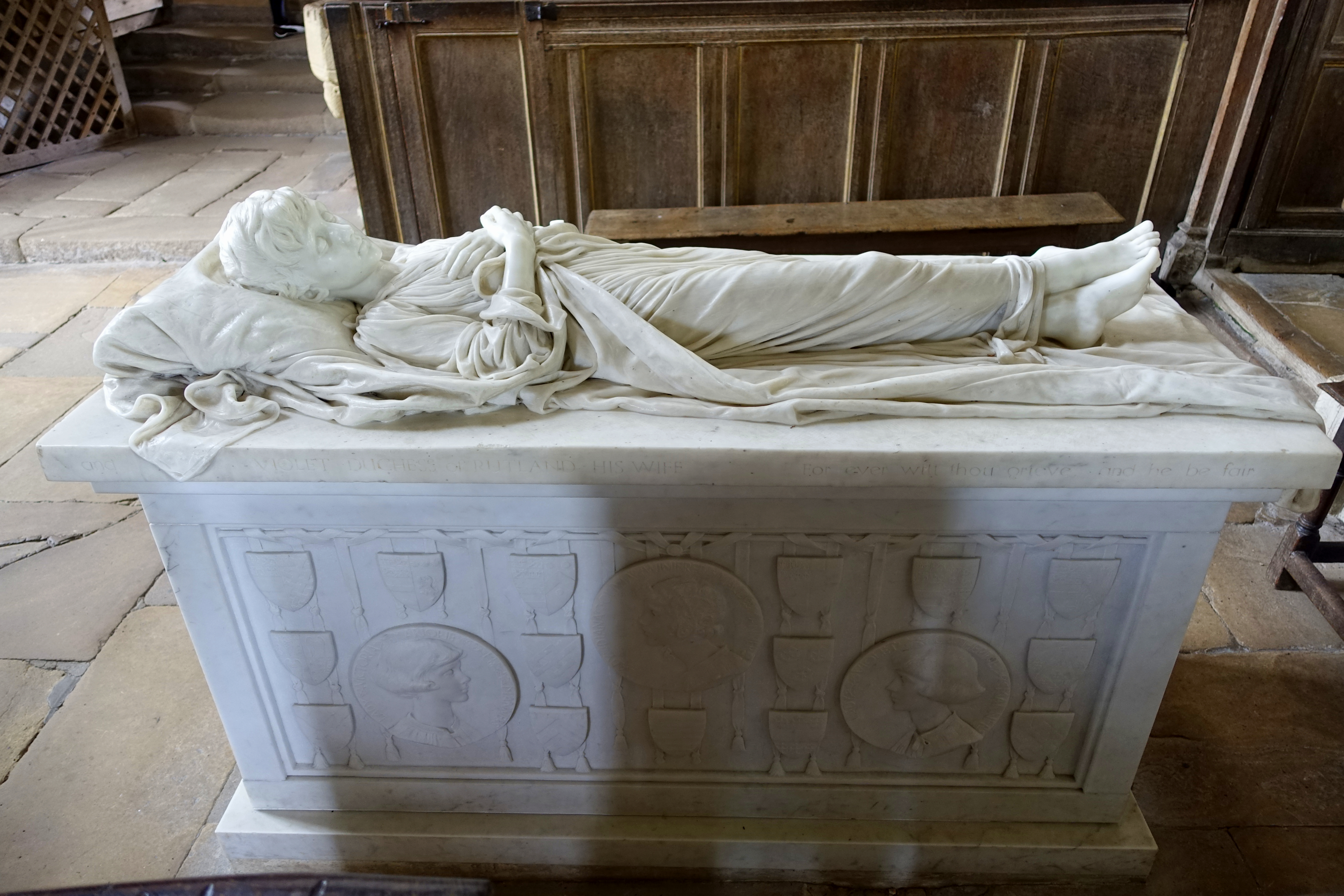
Lord Haddon Memorial Tomb
