= Bleddfa Castle =

Castle in Llangunllo, Powys, Wales

Coordinates: 52.3072°N 3.1623°W

Bleddfa Castle (sometimes referred to as Bledeach or Bledvach Castle) was a motte and bailey structure near Llangunllo in modern-day Powys, Wales. It is believed to have been built before 1195 and abandoned by 1304. What remains today is described as a "mutilated oval mound" of 46 by 36 metres (151 ft × 118 ft), containing some traces of masonry. It is surrounded by a rectangular bailey measuring 100 by 60 metres (330 ft × 200 ft), with a hedge on its northern border.

== Location ==
The ruins of castle are located along the A488 road, near Llangunllo in the northern direction of the Radnor Forest. Bleddfa means “abode of the wolves”, as in the past, during the period of the Tudors, wolves inhabited the area. The last Welsh wolf is said to have been hunted down at Cregina, which is between Builth and Glascwm.

== History ==
The first record of Bleddfa appears in 1195, when Hugh de Say received from King Richard I licence to fortify the castle and a square tower; Hugh had been killed in the battle of Radnor in later part of 1195 itself. In 1262 the castle was captured and razed by Llewelyn ap Gruffydd, who snatched it from the control of the Mortimers. In 1304, Edward I began using material from the castle to erect church tower nearby, which was itself destroyed by the Welsh in 1403.

== Features ==
There is a moat of 9.1 metres (30 ft) depth, which is mostly in a ruined state. The masonry remnant in the mound is believed to have been a square tower. It has an inscription dated 1195, recording a grant for its renovation. Also noted near the bailey are remnants of two towers, which were defended by an artificial lake on the western and southern sides.
