= Ashley Castle =

Castle in Ashley (United Kingdom)

Coordinates: 51.07524°N 1.45183°W

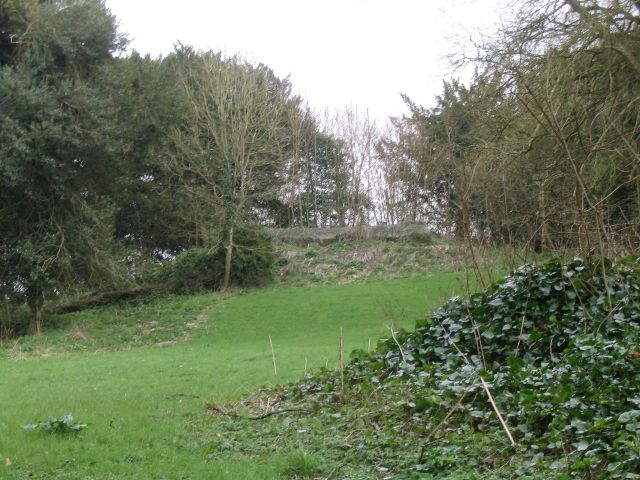
Site of Ashley Castle

The remains of Ashley Castle are in the small village of Ashley, Test Valley, in Hampshire (grid reference SU385308). The visible remains now consist of sections of the ditch and ramparts.

== Construction ==
The castle (also sometimes referred to as Gains Castle), was originally built in 1138, on the site of a former Iron Age fort. The site is likely to have been of strategic value, having a well, standing on high ground above the Somborne valley, and lying a short distance from the Roman road from Winchester to Sarum. Its builder was the powerful Henry de Blois, a grandson of William I of England, and the younger brother of King Stephen. Henry de Blois was the Bishop of Winchester from 1129 until his death 1171, a prolific builder (including of Wolvesey Castle, the bishop's palace in Winchester, and of a number of castles), and one of the most powerful figures of his day in the English kingdom.

== Slighting ==
The castle was built during the Anarchy, a prolonged period of unrest and civil war between opposing factions led by King Stephen and the Empress Matilda. The Anarchy ended with the consensual accession of Matilda's son Henry II in 1154. Shortly afterwards, in 1155, Ashley Castle was slighted (partially demolished), along with other castles built by Henry of Blois. Although Henry II was the son of the Empress Matilda, and Henry of Blois was the brother of her adversary, King Stephen, this was not necessarily an act of retaliation against Henry of Blois; in re-asserting royal authority through the realm, Henry II destroyed numerous unauthorised castles that had been raised during the Anarchy. Further, Henry of Blois had been directly involved in negotiating the peace settlement which ended the Anarchy.

== Reconstruction ==
Despite its slighting in the 1150s, Ashley castle was to have a second lease of life. Within fifty years, during the reign of Henry II's son King John, Ashley Castle was restored by a new owner, William Briwere the elder (c.1145-1226), probably in stone. William Briwere was a wealthy landowner who held the manor of Ashley, as well as large estates in the west country. He was a powerful man and a leading counsellor of three successive kings of England, King Richard I of England, King John and King Henry III. In an early account Briwere was referred to as one of King John's "evil advisers". Intriguingly for aficionados of Robin Hood, one of the offices he held, from 1194 to 1199, was High Sheriff of Nottinghamshire, Derbyshire and the Royal Forests, which makes him a theoretical model for the fictitious Sheriff of Nottingham in the Robin Hood legend. He is also said to have been involved in the signing of Magna Carta in 1215 (though perhaps reluctantly, given his allegiance to the King), founded Mottisfont Abbey, a house of Augustinian canons six miles from Ashley (to whom he donated St Mary's Church, Ashley), and ended his days in 1226 as a Cistercian monk at Dunkeswell Abbey in Devon.

In 1200 King John granted Briwere a licence to crenellate a number of castles, including, in Hampshire, one at either Stockbridge or Ashley, at Briwere's election. Briwere chose Ashley (referred to in the grant as "Esleg"). (There is no castle in Stockbridge, so the reference to it in the grant is a mystery; it may conceivably have been to the ancient hill fort above that town at Woolbury). In an age when the crown saw a potential rebel stronghold in every castle held by a nobleman, and the Anarchy was a recent memory, permission to fortify in this way was a rare privilege. Only five known licences to crenellate were granted in 1200, three of them to John Briwere.

== Seat of the Warden of West Bere ==
King John is documented as having stayed frequently at Ashley, possibly in connection with hunting expeditions in the royal forest of West Bere (also known as Bere Ashley), part of the Forest of Bere, which stretched from the River Itchen to the River Test (which lies two miles west of Ashley). Ashley was the administrative headquarters of the royal forest of West Bere. Official crown business is known to have been transacted from the castle, as a number of royal letters from this era are headed 'Ashley'. The chief royal officer for the forest (which included villages) was the Warden, who had responsibility for enforcing forest law. Wardens were generally important magnates, as Briwere was. The Warden of West Bere had his manor at Ashley, and would have stayed in Ashley castle when in residence. Many royal forests in England had a castle headquarters of this sort. In addition to serving as a residence, pleas were heard, poachers sometimes imprisoned and forest officers housed there. Despite its role as an administrative base for crown land, Ashley Castle appears always to have been considered as part of the manor of Ashley rather than as crown property, and the interests of the wardens were often allowed to overrule the interest of the sovereigns whose property they were supposed to be protecting.

== Under the Despensers ==
The manor of Ashley passed in 1312 from the Briweres to the Despensers, a family in league with another unsuccessful and unpopular king, Edward II of England. Hugh Despenser the Younger was an infamous favourite and counsellor of King Edward II of England, after whose overthrow in 1326 he was found guilty of high treason and hanged, drawn and quartered. Despite this fall from grace, Ashley was shortly afterwards restored to the Despensers, only for history to repeat itself in 1400 when Thomas Despenser, 1st Earl of Gloucester, a supporter of another unpopular King, Richard II of England, was beheaded for his part in the Epiphany Rising against King Henry IV of England. Ashley Castle itself became a residence of the Bishops of Winchester until the middle of the 15th century. It was eventually abandoned as a residence in about the 17th century. All retrievable stone was removed and re-used elsewhere.

== Form ==
In its earliest form, the castle was an earth and timber ringwork fortification. The ringwork was located on a spur of high ground and consisted of a banked rampart surrounded by a deep ditch, probably re-using the earlier Iron Age defences. A Great Hall and/or tower stood within the ringwork. Extending westwards in a loop from the ringwork was a second, outer bank enclosing a broadly rectangular court - the bailey - which contained all the ancillary domestic buildings associated with such a settlement. Both banks were surmounted by wooden palisades. Also located in the bailey was the parish church, St Mary's Church, Ashley, which probably dates from the same period as the original castle (early 12th century). The church survives, long outliving the castle. The visible remains of the castle now consist of sections of the ditch and ramparts.

The castle is typically Norman in the small size of the occupied area and the strength of its ramparts, and in having a bailey; its north-east part contains visible remains of foundations.

The site, on private land, is a scheduled monument, protected by law.

== See also ==
- Fry, Plantagenet Somerset (1980). The David & Charles Book of Castles. Newton Abbot: David & Charles. p. 180. ISBN 0-7153-7976-3.
- St. Mary's Church, Ashley
