= St Mary's Church, Ashley =

Coordinates: 51.0762°N 1.4519°W

St. Mary's Church, Ashley
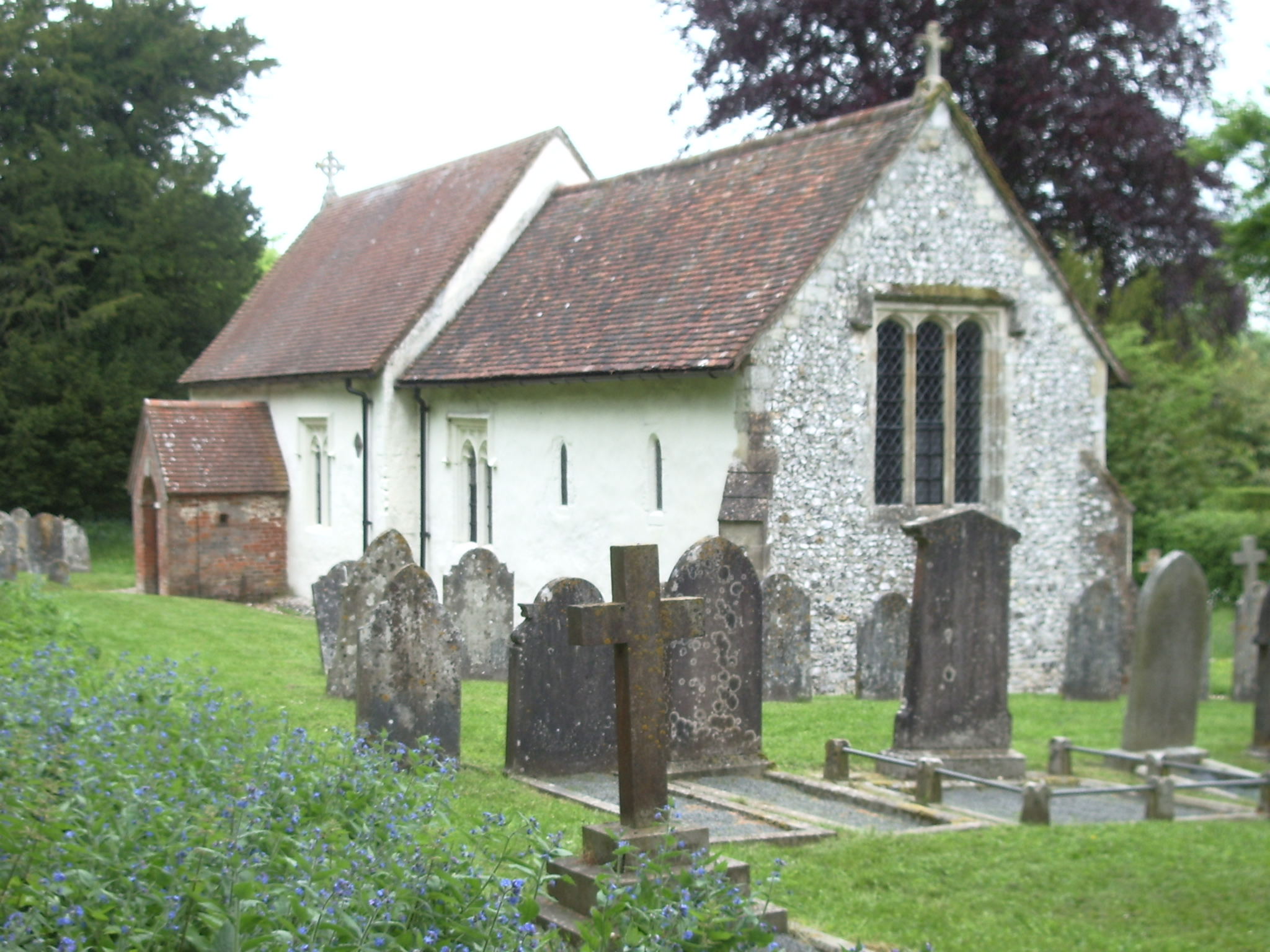
- St Mary's Church, Ashley, from the southeast

- Location in Hampshire
- OS grid reference: SU 385 309
- Location: Ashley, Hampshire
- Country: England
- Denomination: Anglican
- Website: Churches Conservation Trust

Architecture
- Heritage designation: Grade II*
- Designated: 29 May 1957
- Architectural type: Church
- Style: Gothic

Specifications
- Materials: Flint rubble partly rendered Brick porch Tiled roofs

St. Mary's Church is a historic Anglican church in the hamlet of Ashley, Hampshire, England. It is recorded in the National Heritage List for England as a designated Grade II* listed building, and is under the care of The Churches Conservation Trust. The church stands adjacent to the site of the former Gains Castle, some 4 miles (6 km) southeast of Stockbridge.

== History ==
The church dates from the early part of the 12th century, and the chancel was extended later in the century. The windows date from the 15th and 16th centuries, and the porch was added in 1701. Restorations were carried out on 1858 and in 1895. The church closed in 1976.

== Architecture ==
=== Exterior ===
St. Mary's is constructed in flint rubble with stone dressings and quoins. The walls, other than the east wall, are rendered. The porch is brick and the roofs are tiled. It is a small narrow church with a simple plan, consisting of a nave and a chancel, with a south porch. The three-light square-headed east window dates from the 14th century, and has been restored. At the corners of the east end are 16th-century diagonal buttresses, and on the gable is a stone cross. There are two 12th-century round-headed lancet windows in the south wall of the chancel and one in the north wall. To the west of these, on both north and south sides, is a 15th-century square-headed two-light window. The north wall of the nave contains another 12th-century round-headed lancet window. In both north and south walls is a 19th-century two-light window in Perpendicular style. The porch is gabled and has a round-headed doorway. In each wall is a five-sided window. The west window dates from the 15th century. There are two bell openings in the west gable, which contains the bells, and on the gable is a 12th-century cross.

=== Interior ===
Inside the church many of the windows are splayed. In the splay of a window on the south of the chancel is a 13th-century painting of a human figure. There are two monuments dating from the 18th century. On each side of the chancel arch is a round-headed squint. To the east of the door is a damaged piscina, and to its west is a 16th-century alms box that has been carved from a tree trunk. The font is Norman. It is made in Purbeck marble, and consists of a square bowl supported by a moulded stem on a square base. The other fittings date from the 19th century.

== External features ==
A pair of tombchests in the churchyard is designated as a Grade II listed building. They are made from Portland stone and date from the 19th century, although their inscriptions are illegible.

== See also ==
- List of churches preserved by the Churches Conservation Trust in South East England
