= Church of St George, Sampford Brett =

Church in Somerset, England

Church of St George
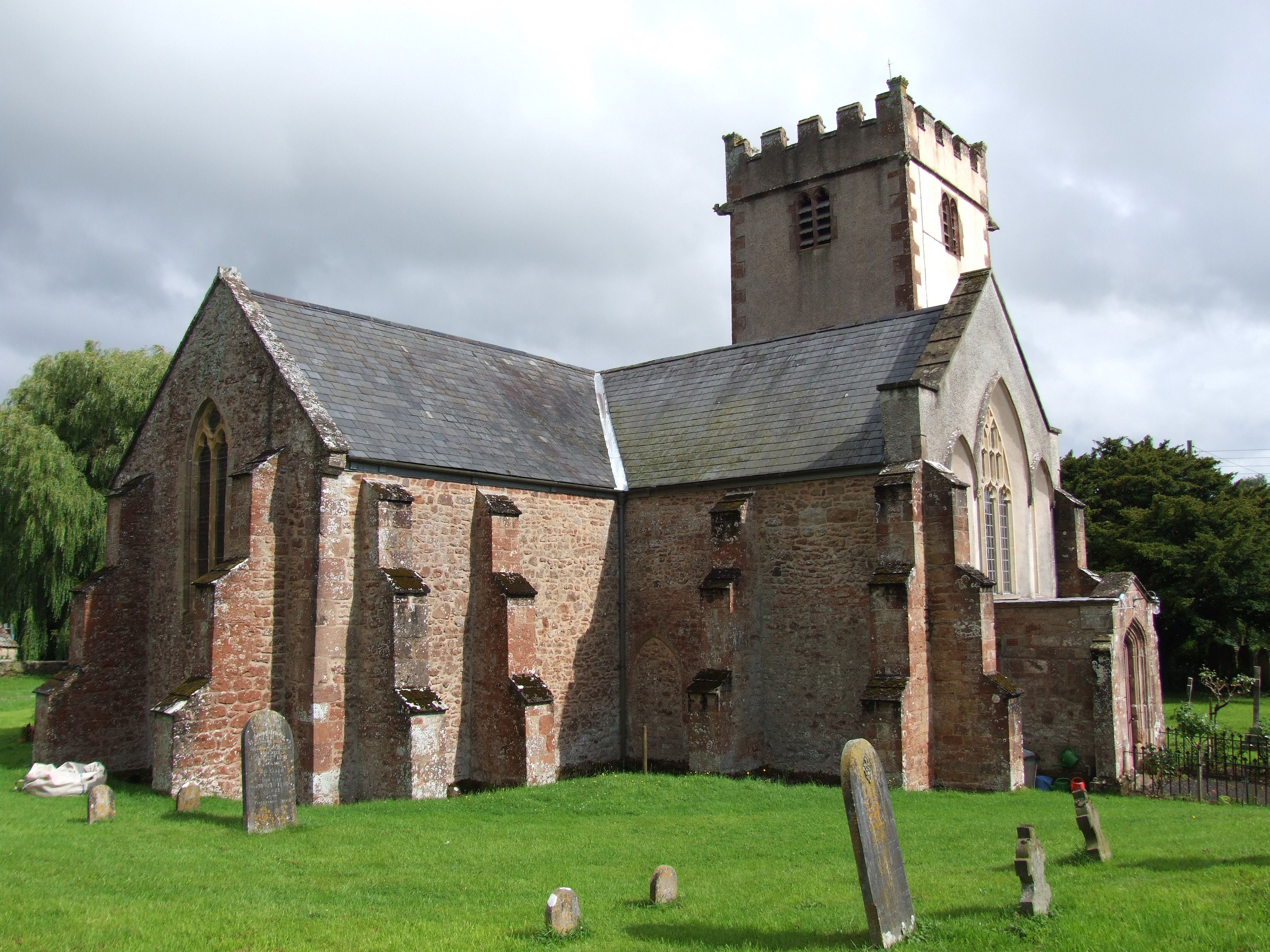

- Location within Somerset
- 51.1538°N 3.3033°W
- Location: Sampford Brett, Somerset, England

History
- Built: c. 1300

Listed Building – Grade II*
- Official name: Church of St George
- Designated: 22 May 1969
- Reference no.: 1295828

The Anglican Church of St George in Sampford Brett, Somerset, England was built around 1300. It is a Grade II* listed building.

== History ==
The parish Church of St George was built around 1300, and dedicated in 1306. The north transept and tower were added in the late 14th or early 15th centuries. In the 1830s and 1840s the chancel, vestry and west end of the nave were rebuilt. The west porch and organ chamber were restored between 1960 and 1962 following damage during World War II. The west windows were rebuilt in 1967.

The parish is part of Quantock Towers benefice within the Diocese of Bath and Wells.

== Architecture ==
The stone building has slate roofs. The two-stage tower has exposed quoins.

The walls and gates around the church were added in the mid 19th century.

In the churchyard is Celtic style cross which was erected in 1919 and serves as the war memorial for the village.

== See also ==
- List of ecclesiastical parishes in the Diocese of Bath and Wells
