= Haddon Hall =

Medieval country house in Derbyshire, England

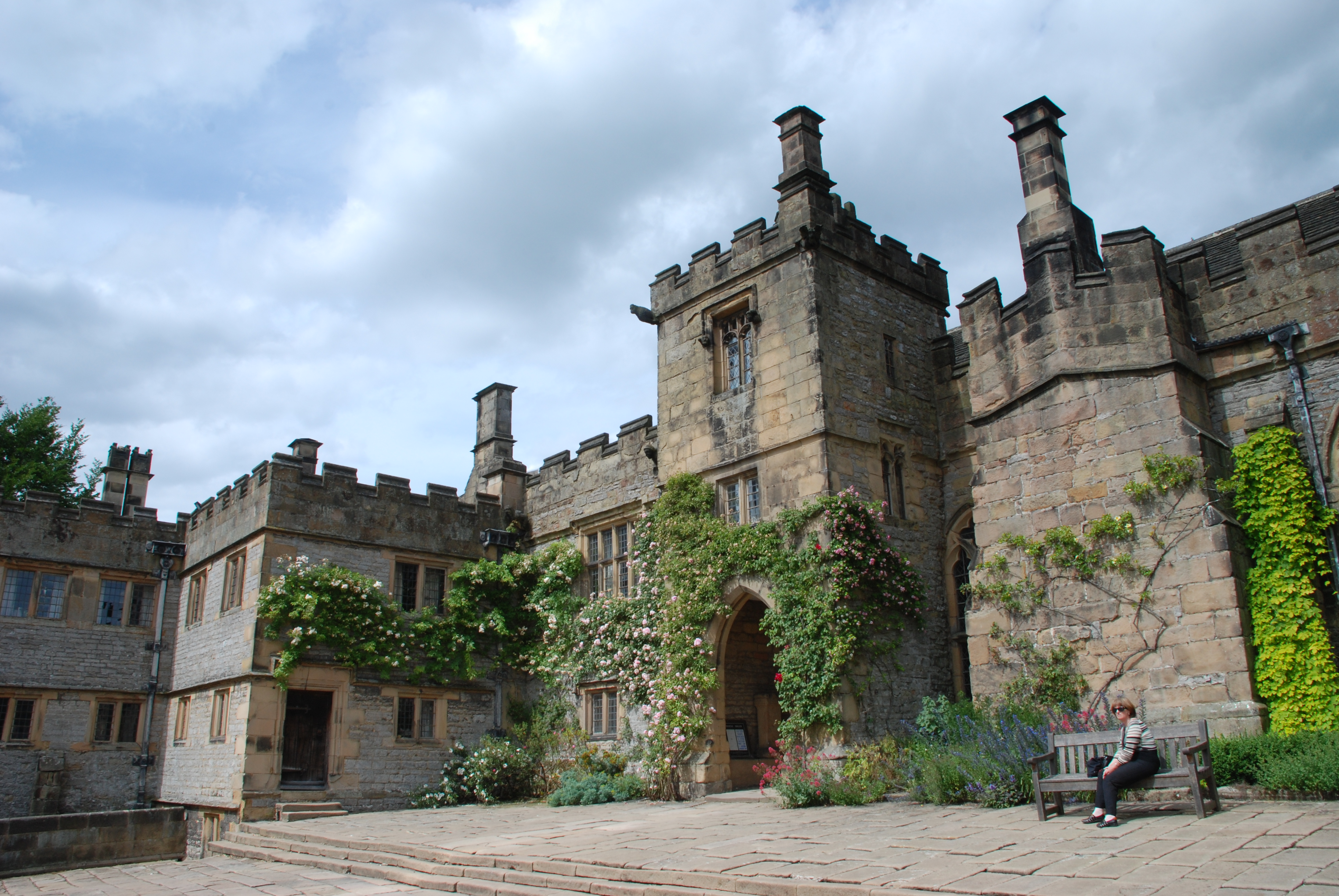
- Haddon Hall in 2010

- Location within Derbyshire

General information
- Type: Country house
- Location: Bakewell, Derbyshire, England
- Coordinates: 53.1939°N 1.6498°W

Website
- www.haddonhall.co.uk

Listed Building – Grade I
- Official name: Haddon Hall
- Designated: 29 September 1951
- Reference no.: 1334982

National Register of Historic Parks and Gardens
- Designated: 4 August 1984
- Reference no.: 1000679

Haddon Hall is an English country house on the River Wye near Bakewell, Derbyshire, a former seat of the Dukes of Rutland. It is the home of Lord Edward Manners (brother of the incumbent Duke) and his family. In form a medieval manor house, it has been described as "the most complete and most interesting house of [its] period". The origins of the hall are from the 11th century, with additions at various stages between the 13th and the 17th centuries, latterly in the Tudor style.

The Vernon family acquired the Manor of Haddon by a 12th-century marriage between Sir Richard de Vernon and Alice Avenell, daughter of William Avenell II. Four centuries later, in 1563, Dorothy Vernon, the daughter and heiress of Sir George Vernon, married John Manners, the second son of Thomas Manners, 1st Earl of Rutland. A legend grew up in the 19th century that Dorothy and Manners eloped. The legend has been made into novels, dramatisations and other works of fiction. She nevertheless inherited the hall, and their grandson, also John Manners, inherited the Earldom in 1641 from a distant cousin. His son, another John Manners, was made 1st Duke of Rutland in 1703. In the 20th century, another John Manners, 9th Duke of Rutland, made a life's work of restoring the hall.

== History ==
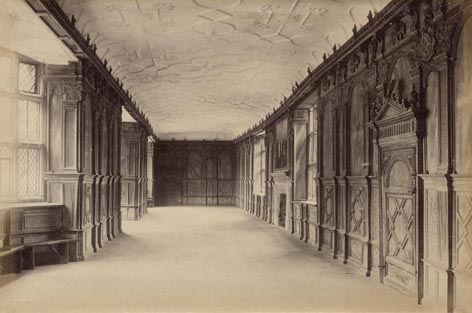
Haddon Hall's Long Gallery, c. 1890

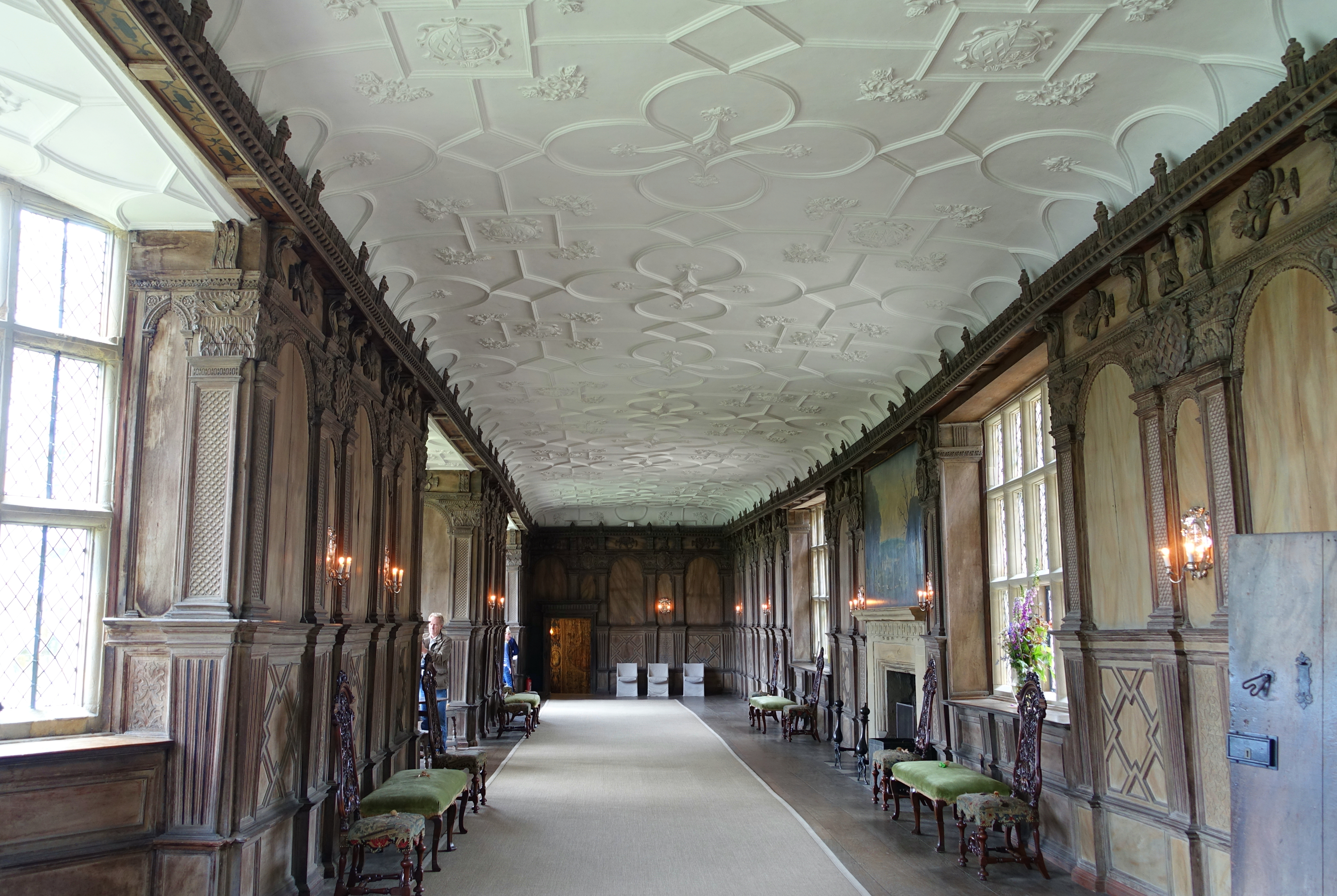
Haddon Hall's Long Gallery, 2017

The origins of the hall date to the 11th century. William Peverel held the manor of Haddon in 1087, when the survey which resulted in the Domesday Book was undertaken. Though it was never a castle, the manor of Haddon was protected by a wall after a licence to build one was granted in 1194. The hall was forfeited to the Crown in 1153 and later passed to a tenant of the Peverils, the Avenell family. Sir Richard de Vernon acquired the manor in 1170 after his marriage to Alice Avenell, the daughter of William Avenell. The Vernons built most of the hall, except for the Peveril Tower and part of the Chapel of St Nicholas, which preceded them, and the Long Gallery, which was built in the 16th century. Richard's son, Sir William Vernon, was a High Sheriff of Lancashire and Chief Justice of Cheshire. Prominent later family members include Sir Richard Vernon (1390–1451), also a High Sheriff, MP and Speaker of the House of Commons. His son Sir William was Knight-Constable of England and succeeded him as Treasurer of Calais and MP for Derbyshire and Staffordshire; his grandson Sir Henry Vernon KB (1441–1515) Governor and Treasurer to Arthur, Prince of Wales, married Anne Talbot daughter of the Earl of Shrewsbury and rebuilt Haddon Hall.

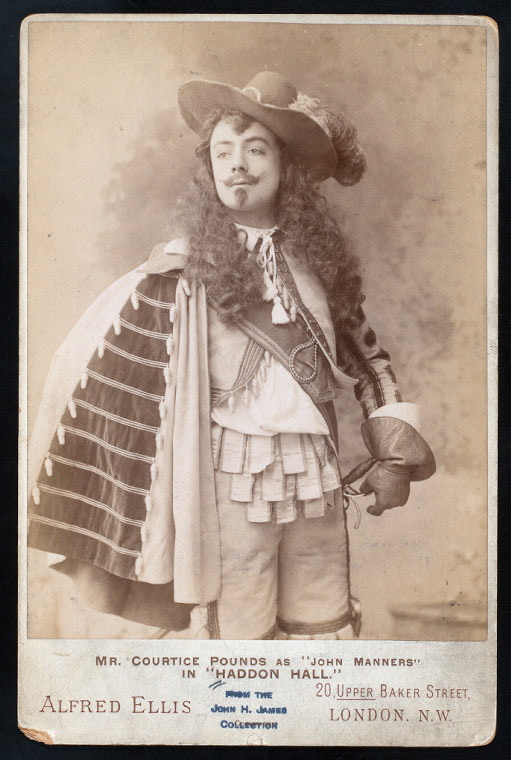
Courtice Pounds as John Manners in Haddon Hall, 1892

Sir George Vernon (c. 1503 – 31 August 1565) had two daughters, Margaret and Dorothy. Dorothy married John Manners, the second son of Thomas Manners, 1st Earl of Rutland in 1563. Sir George supposedly disapproved of the union, possibly because the Manners family were Protestants whereas the Vernons were Catholics, or possibly because the second son of an earl had uncertain financial prospects. According to legend, Sir George forbade John Manners from courting the famously beautiful and amiable Dorothy and forbade his daughter from seeing Manners. Shielded by the crowd during a ball given at Haddon Hall by Sir George in 1563, Dorothy slipped away and fled through the gardens, down stone steps and over a footbridge where Manners was waiting for her, and they rode away to be married. If indeed the elopement happened, the couple were soon reconciled with Sir George, as they inherited the estate on his death two years later. Their grandson, also John Manners of Haddon, inherited the Earldom in 1641, on the death of his distant cousin, George, the 7th Earl of Rutland, whose estates included Belvoir Castle.

That John Manners' son was John, the 9th Earl, and was made 1st Duke of Rutland in 1703. He moved to Belvoir Castle, and his heirs used Haddon Hall very little, so it lay almost in its unaltered 16th-century condition, as it had been when it passed in 1567 by marriage to the Manners family. In the 1920s, another John Manners, the 9th Duke of Rutland, realised its importance and began a lifetime of meticulous restoration, with his restoration architect Harold Brakspear. The current medieval and Tudor hall includes small sections of the 11th-century structure, but it mostly comprises additional chambers and ranges added by the successive generations of the Vernon family. Major construction was carried out at various stages between the 13th and the 16th centuries. The banqueting hall (with minstrels' gallery), kitchens and parlour date from 1370, and St Nicholas Chapel was completed in 1427. For generations, whitewash concealed and protected their pre-Reformation frescoes.

The 9th Duke created the walled topiary garden adjoining the stable-block cottage, with clipped heraldic devices of the boar's head and the peacock, emblematic of the Vernon and Manners families. Haddon Hall remains in the Manners family to the present day, and has been occupied since 2016 by Lord Edward Manners, brother of the 11th Duke of Rutland, and Lady Edward Manners.

The house was Grade I listed in 1951 following the passing of the Town and Country Planning Act 1947. The estate and gardens were separately listed at Grade I in 1984 on the Register of Historic Parks and Gardens.

In 2011 the hall's foundations were identified as needing urgent repairs to mitigate potential damage to the ornate plaster ceiling and central bay of the Long Gallery, but the owners were unable to finance these. In 2021 a £262,662 grant from Historic England, together with an additional £50,000 from the Historic Houses Foundation, enabled works to be started.

== Layout ==
The hall stands on a sloping site, and is structured around two courtyards; the upper (north-east) courtyard contains the Peverel or Eagle Tower and the Long Gallery, the lower (south-west) courtyard houses the chapel, while the Great Hall lies between the two. As was normal when the hall was built, many of the rooms can only be reached from outside or by passing through other rooms, making the house inconvenient by later standards.

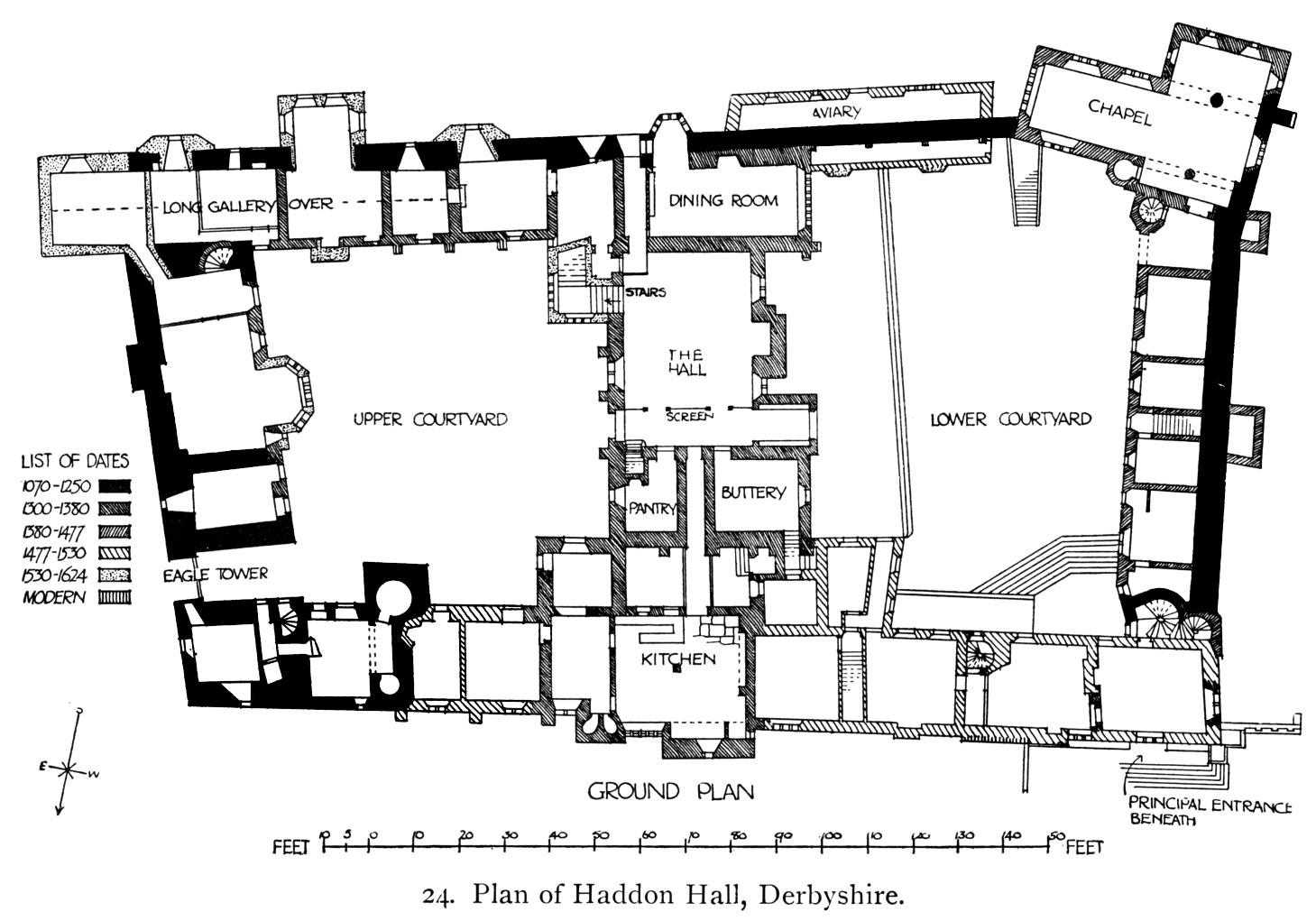
A plan of Haddon Hall, 1909

== In literature and the arts ==
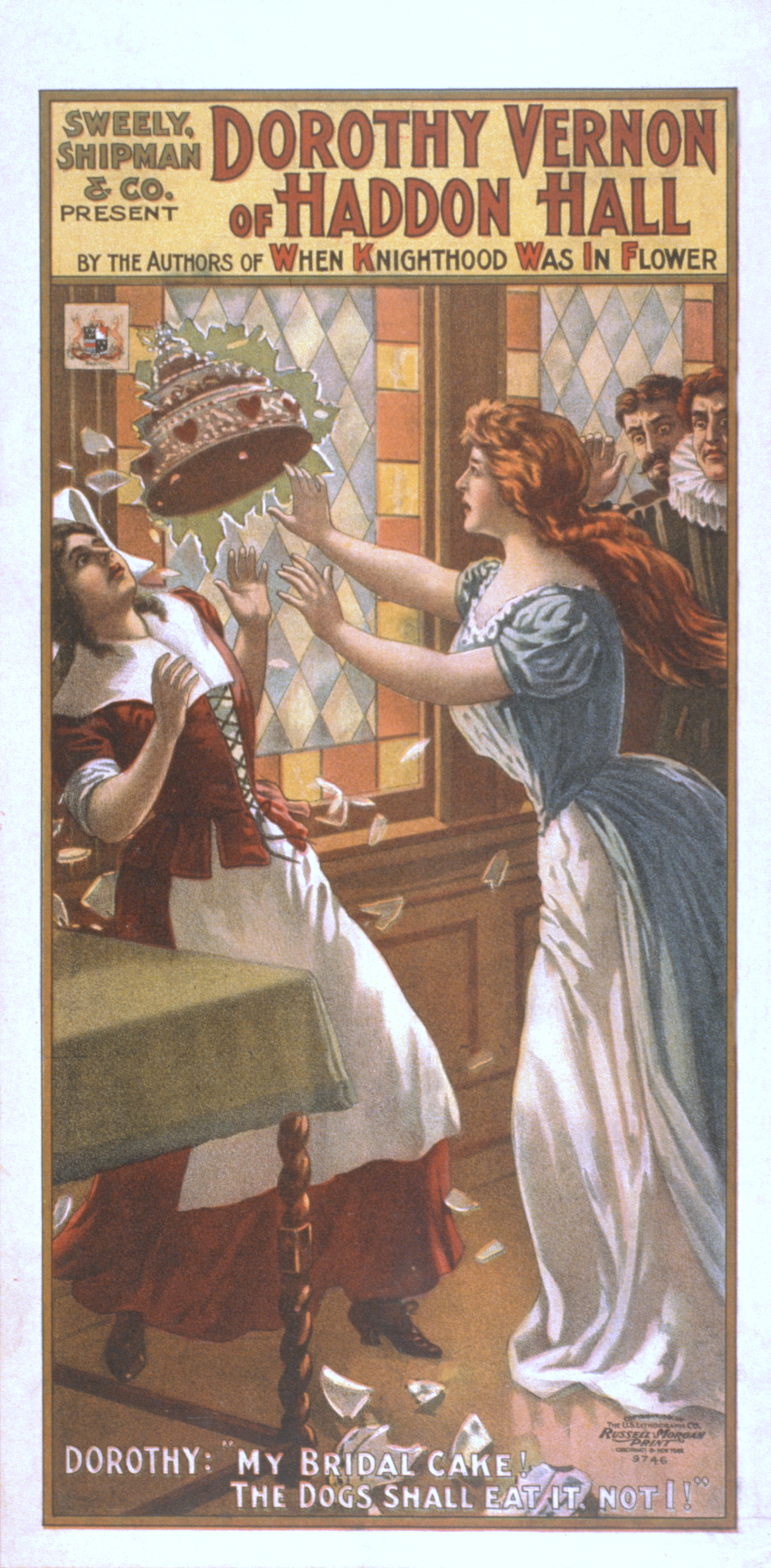
Poster: 1906 production of Dorothy Vernon of Haddon Hall

The hall has figured prominently in a number of literary and stage works, including the following, all of which describe the Vernon/Manners elopement:

- A story entitled King of the Peak – A Derbyshire Tale, written by Allan Cunningham, was published in the London Magazine in 1822.
- An 1823 novel, The King of the Peak – A Romance, in three volumes, was written by William Bennett (1796–1879), writing under the pseudonym Lee Gibbons.
- "The Love Steps of Dorothy Vernon", a short story by Eliza Meteyard (1816–1879), writing under a pseudonym in 1849, was the first full-blown version of the legend. It was first published in the 29 December 1849 issue of Eliza Cook's Journal and then in The Reliquary, October 1860, p. 79.
- A light opera, called Haddon Hall, with music by Arthur Sullivan and a libretto by Sydney Grundy, premiered in London in 1892.
- A novel called Dorothy Vernon of Haddon Hall was written in 1902 by American Charles Major and became a best seller.
- A play of the same name, based on Major's novel, was written by American playwright Paul Kester. It debuted on Broadway in 1903. Fred Terry and his wife Julia Neilson adapted that play for London, calling it Dorothy o' the Hall, where it played in 1906.
- A 1924 film, Dorothy Vernon of Haddon Hall, starring Mary Pickford, was adapted by American screenwriter Waldemar Young (grandson of Brigham Young) from the Major novel.
- Frederick Booty, the English watercolourist, painted Haddon Hall several times, including pictures of the peacocks in the gardens.
- English painter Joseph Nash depicted the main hall in oils in 1838, a painting later used (with alterations) as the cover art for the 1975 album Minstrel in the Gallery by progressive rock band Jethro Tull.

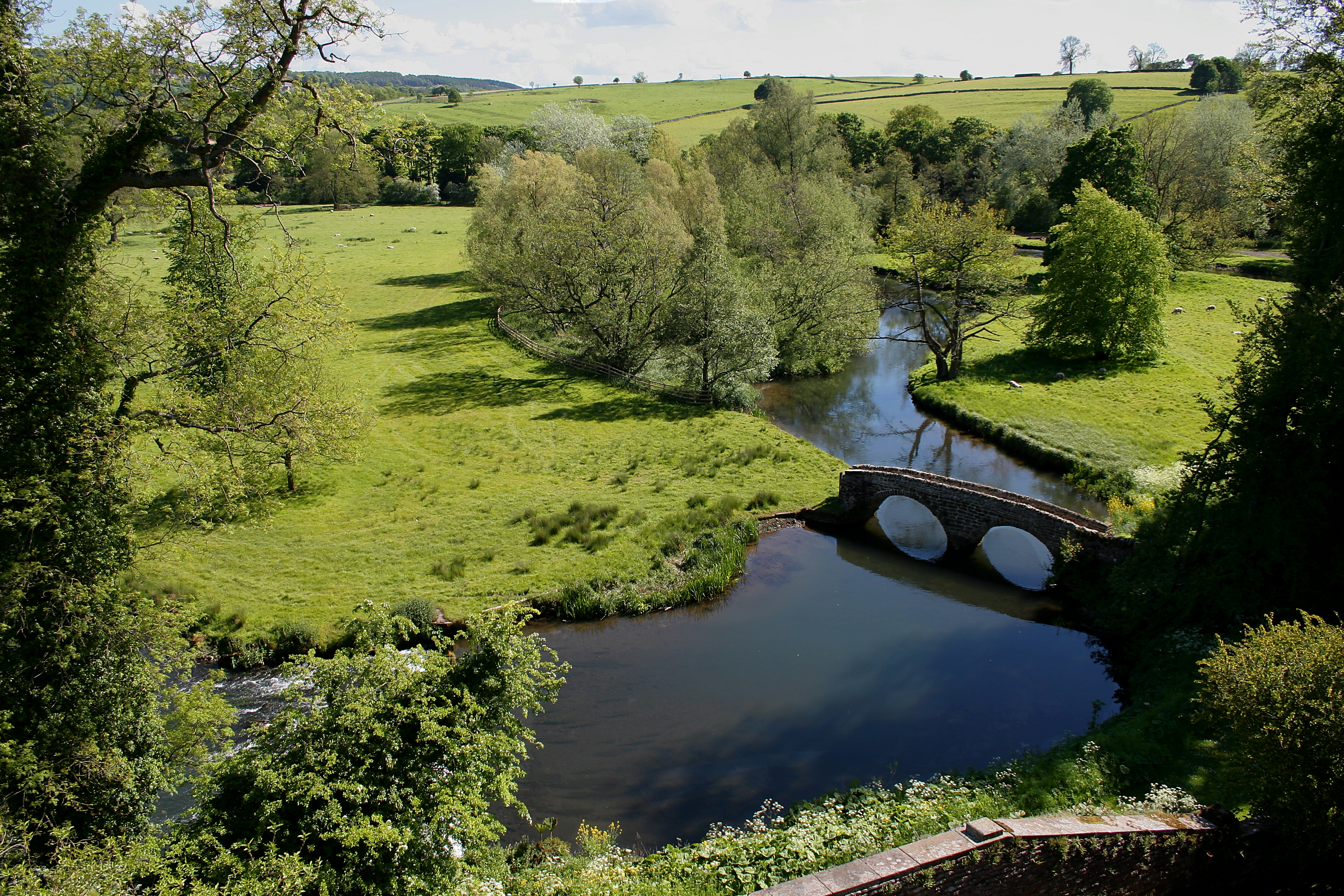
A view from Haddon Hall, showing Dorothy Vernon Bridge over the Wye River

== Filming location ==
The hall has been used as a location for the filming of the television series Treasure Houses of Britain (1985), The Silver Chair (1990), Jane Eyre (2006), A Tudor Feast at Christmas (2013), Time Crashers (2015), and Gunpowder (2017).

It was also a location used in the feature films Lady Jane (1986), The Princess Bride (1987), Jane Eyre (1996), Elizabeth (1998), Pride & Prejudice (2005), The Other Boleyn Girl (2008), Jane Eyre (2011), Mary Queen of Scots (2018), The King (2019), and Firebrand (2023).

== See also ==
- Grade I listed buildings in Derbyshire
- Listed buildings in Nether Haddon

== Sources ==
- Trutt, David, Dorothy Vernon of Haddon Hall (2006)
