= Nether Haddon =

Village in Derbyshire, England

Coordinates: 53.192°N 1.652°W

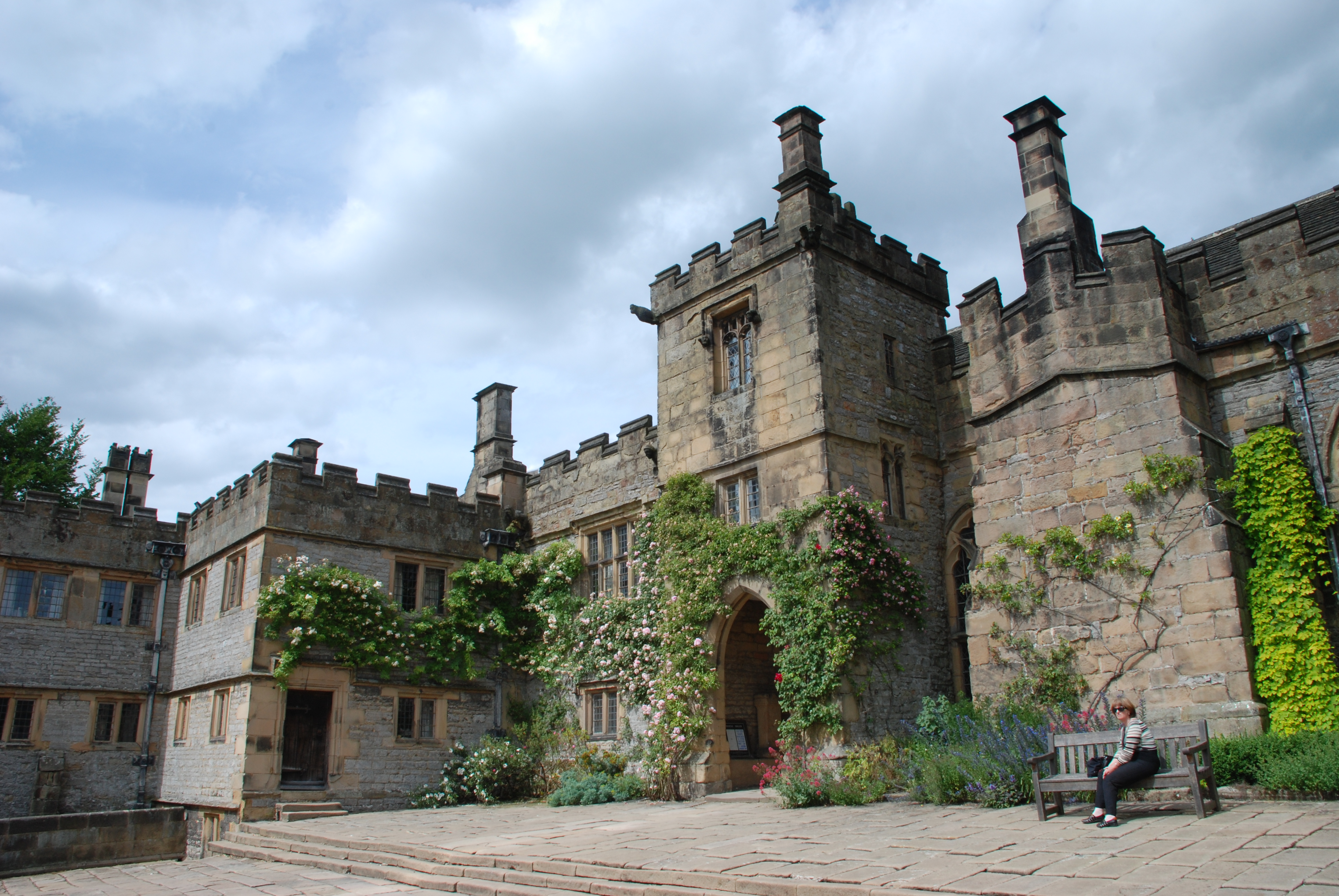
- Haddon Hall, Nether Haddon

- Location within Derbyshire
- Area: 12.18 km^{2} (4.70 sq mi)
- Population: 255 (Civil Parish and much of Over Haddon)
  - Density: 21/km^{2} (54/sq mi)
- OS grid reference: SK2366
- District: Derbyshire Dales
- Shire county: Derbyshire
- Region: East Midlands
- Country: England
- Sovereign state: United Kingdom
- Post town: BAKEWELL
- Postcode district: DE45
- Police: Derbyshire
- Fire: Derbyshire
- Ambulance: East Midlands

Nether Haddon is a sparsely populated village and civil parish in Derbyshire, England. It is immediately downstream along the River Wye from the small town of Bakewell and much of its land is owned by Haddon Hall, a medieval and Tudor building largely rendered in stone. The population of the village is included in the civil parish of Over Haddon.

== Geography ==
Nether Haddon is centred on the River Wye north-west of the confluence of the tributary the River Lathkill, which marks part of the southern boundary. While it has no churches, Over Haddon to the west has two churches, a public house, and a car park.

The name "Haddon" means "Heath Hill", the "Nether" referring to being below "Over Haddon". Elevations reach 211 m above Ordnance Datum, just above headsprings in the north. In the east, before flowing into Rowsley, the Wye is at 106 m, which is similar to the Hall at the centre of the civil parish. To the east, the Wye which follows the A6 joins the Derwent, 1 mile (1.6 km) away.

== Transport ==
Road

It is astride the A6, which is not a dual carriageway in most of Derbyshire and is a hilly route across the Pennines, without major sections of cutting or embankment compared to the motorway and train network which provides higher speed.

Rail, by cycle and on foot

The Monsal Trail is a track that runs directly along the valley floor to north Derbyshire, past Haddon Hall very closely, passing through its grounds. It is in part the proposal of a reopening of a railway, to Bakewell from the current end of the Peak Railway at Rowsley.

The nearest railway is across the small town of Rowsley on Peak Rail, a steam and heritage diesel service chiefly for tourists and visitors. This station is its terminus, Rowsley South railway station.

== Landmarks ==
No more than six farmhouses and the tightly packed cluster of mixed-size buildings at Haddon Hall comprise all of the permanent buildings in the parish.

== Demography ==
It forms less than one hall of 2011 census output area E00099141 in terms of population, which includes most of Over Haddon which is larger in area and population. The proportion of properties rented and mortgaged in 2011 was below the national average, and the proportion owned outright is greater than the national average.

2011 census key statistics
Output area	Population	Households	% Owned outright	% Owned with a loan	hectares
E00099141	255	113	48.7%	32.7%	1218
