= Sampford Brett =

Village and civil parish in Somerset, England

Coordinates: 51.1564°N 3.3097°W

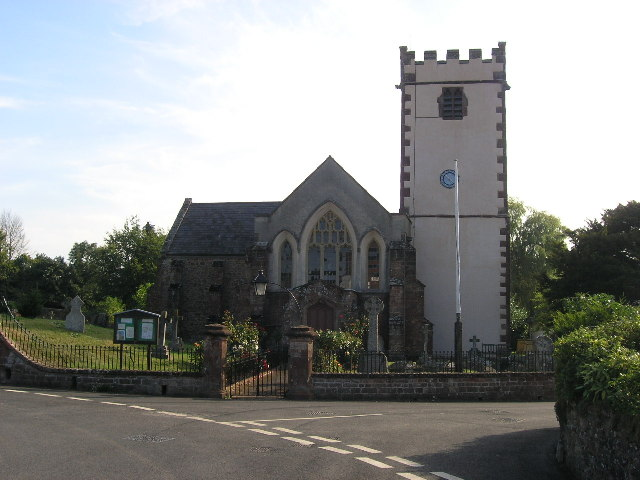
- Church of St George, Sampford Brett

- Location within Somerset
- Population: 270 (2011)
- OS grid reference: ST085405
- Unitary authority: Somerset Council
- Ceremonial county: Somerset
- Region: South West
- Country: England
- Sovereign state: United Kingdom
- Post town: Taunton
- Postcode district: TA4
- Dialling code: 01984
- Police: Avon and Somerset
- Fire: Devon and Somerset
- Ambulance: South Western
- UK Parliament: Tiverton and Minehead

Sampford Brett is a village and civil parish situated at the south-western edge of the Quantock Hills, Somerset, England, less than 1 mile (1.6 km) south of Williton, just off the A358 road to Taunton.

== Geography ==
It lies in a shallow valley cut by the Sampford stream running from Aller Farm, and its main street runs east–west from the church to the crossroads at the western end. To the south and east of the village there is a good view of the Quantock Hills and it is shielded from the main road by the rising hill to the north.

== History ==
The village takes the first part of its name from the sandy ford which crossed the Doniford stream between Sampford Brett and Woolston and the second part from the Brett family, who held the manor from the 12th century until they sold it to the Courtneys in 1359.

The parish includes the Domesday manor of Torweston.

The parish of Sampford Brett was part of the Williton and Freemanners Hundred.

== Governance ==
The parish council has responsibility for local issues, including setting an annual precept (local rate) to cover the council's operating costs and producing annual accounts for public scrutiny. The parish council evaluates local planning applications and works with the local police, district council officers, and neighbourhood watch groups on matters of crime, security, and traffic. The parish council's role also includes initiating projects for the maintenance and repair of parish facilities, as well as consulting with the district council on the maintenance, repair, and improvement of highways, drainage, footpaths, public transport, and street cleaning. Conservation matters (including trees and listed buildings) and environmental issues are also the responsibility of the council.

For local government purposes, since 1 April 2023, the parish comes under the unitary authority of Somerset Council. Prior to this, it was part of the non-metropolitan district of Somerset West and Taunton (formed on 1 April 2019) and, before this, the district of West Somerset (established under the Local Government Act 1972). It was part of Williton Rural District before 1974.

It is also part of the Bridgwater and West Somerset county constituency represented in the House of Commons of the Parliament of the United Kingdom. It elects one Member of Parliament (MP) by the first past the post system of election.

== Religious sites ==
The parish Church of St George was built around 1300. The north transept and tower were added in the late 14th or early 15th centuries. In 1835–43 the chancel, vestry and west end of the nave were rebuilt. The west porch and organ chamber were restored in 1960–62 following damage during World War II. The west windows were rebuilt in 1967. It has been designated as a Grade II* listed building.

== Notable residents ==
Sampford Brett is the birthplace of Richard le Breton, one of the four knights who murdered Saint Thomas Becket.

It was the birthplace of the professional cricketer Haydn Sully.
