= Ashley, Test Valley =

Village and parish in Hampshire, England

Coordinates: 51.077°N 1.452°W

Ashley
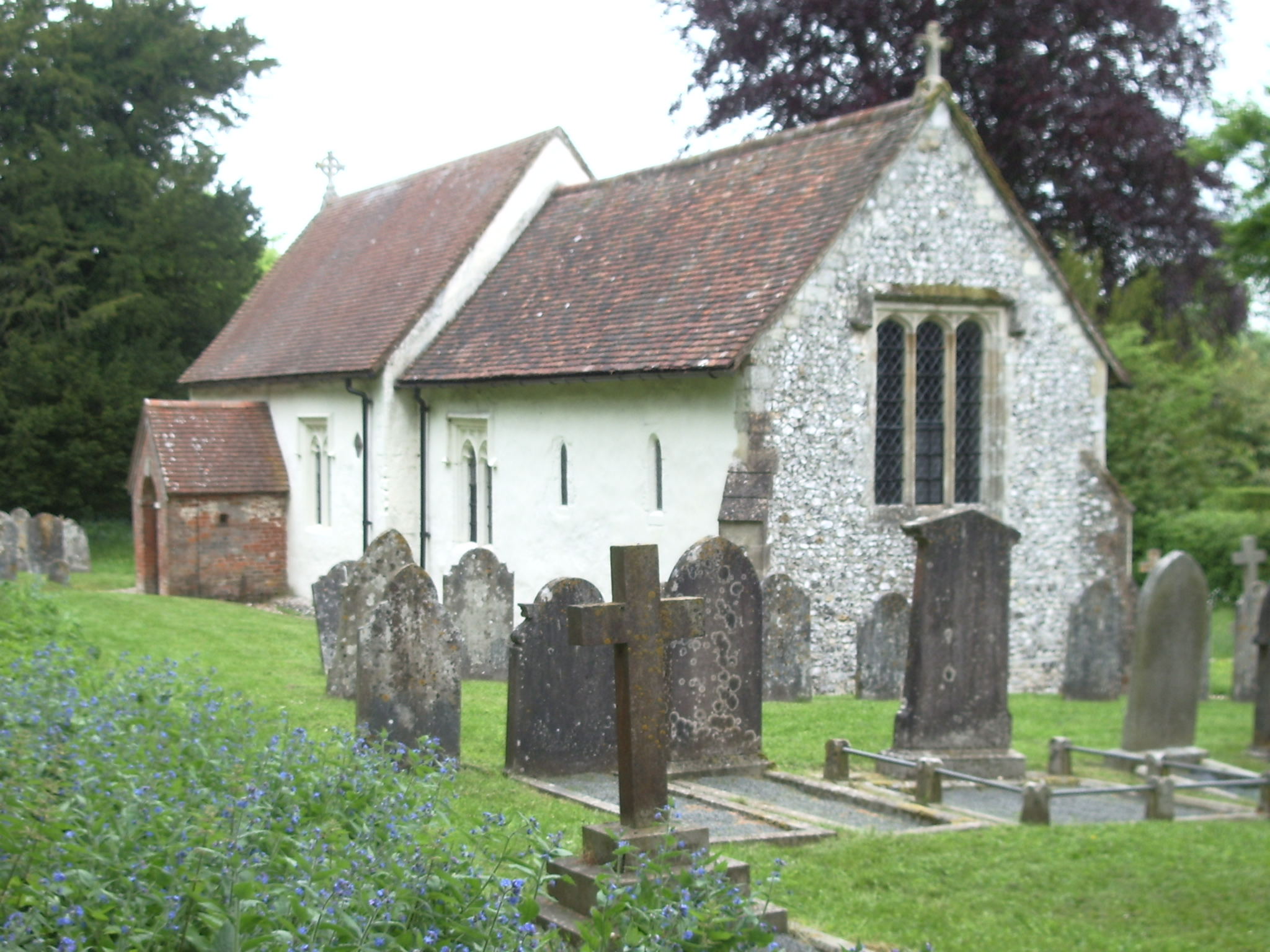

- Location within Hampshire
- Population: 72
- OS grid reference: SU385310
- District: Test Valley
- Shire county: Hampshire
- Region: South East
- Country: England
- Sovereign state: United Kingdom
- Post town: STOCKBRIDGE
- Postcode district: SO20
- Dialling code: 01794
- Police: Hampshire and Isle of Wight
- Fire: Hampshire and Isle of Wight
- Ambulance: South Central
- UK Parliament: Romsey and Southampton North

Ashley is a village and civil parish in the Test Valley district of Hampshire, England, 8 miles (13 km) west of Winchester. Its nearest town is Stockbridge, which lies 2.6 miles (4.2 km) north-west. At the 2001 census the parish had a population of 72. It is in the civil parish of King's Somborne. Ashley Castle is in the village.

== See also ==
- St Mary's Church, Ashley
