= Licence to crenellate =

Formal permission to build a fortification

In medieval England, Wales and the Channel Islands a licence to crenellate (or licence to fortify) granted the holder permission to fortify his property. Such licences were granted by the king, and by the rulers of the counties palatine within their jurisdictions, i.e. by the Bishops of Durham, the Earls of Chester, and after 1351 by the Dukes of Lancaster.

Licences to crenellate were issued from the 12th to 16th centuries. The earliest licences present a point of contention. For instance although an authority such as John Goodall in his book The English Castle considers a charter of 1127 to be one, it was rejected as such by Philip Davis. In 1199 the administration of the country began to be systematically recorded, and the majority of licences survive in the Patent Rolls. Letters patent were distributed and were a public declaration that the person named within had been granted permission by the king to build a fortification. During periods of conflict, the number of licences granted usually increased. Only in a small number of cases did the Crown levy fees against those applying for licences to crenellate, and then it was only a small amount, a mark or half a mark.

Of those given permission to build fortifications, most were knights rather than the upper members of the aristocracy. Most applicants were individuals; however, towns could also apply and 28 licences relate to town defences. While most people who secured licences were secular, ecclesiastic institutions were also eligible: 44 licences relate to churches, abbeys, and cathedrals. While licences were mostly granted to men, eleven women are mentioned in the surviving licences and four licences were granted directly to women.

Licences to crenellate are generally regarded as obsolete in the modern world. However, they have never been formally abolished in law, and whether they remain legally valid is still a matter of debate.

== Historiography ==
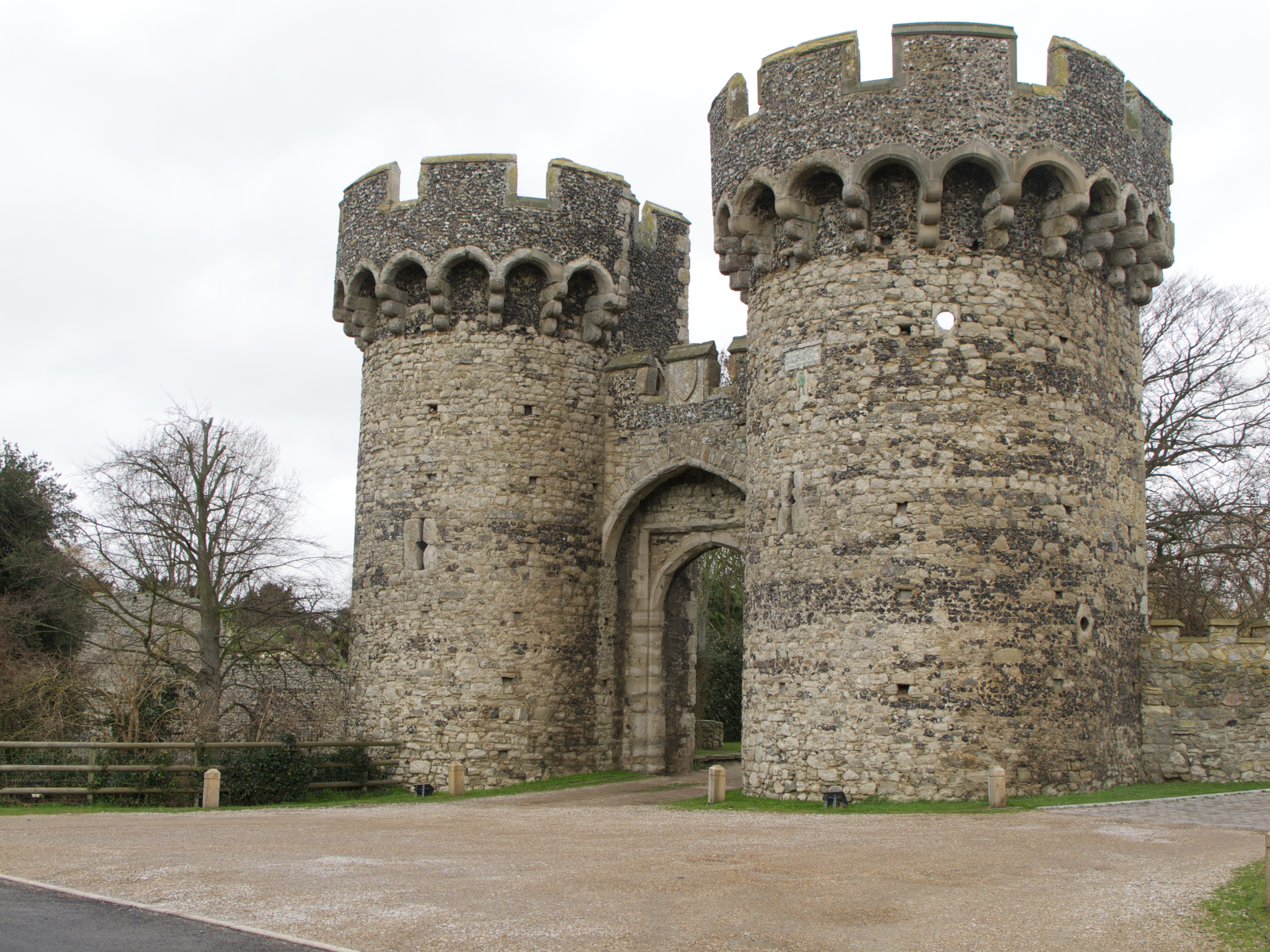
The outer gatehouse of Cooling Castle, Kent, displays its licence to crenellate on a brass plaque (granted 1381).

The term "licence to crenellate" was coined in the 19th century to describe documents that granted the holder permission to build fortifications. The reference to crenellation was chosen specifically because most of these documents made references to battlements. There has been academic debate over the purpose of licensing. The view of military-focused historians is that licensing restricted the number of fortifications that could be used against a royal army, so the licensing system protected royal power across the country against local interests. The modern view, proposed notably by Charles Coulson, is that in time battlements became an architectural status-symbol much sought after by the socially ambitious, and licensing became not so much a control mechanism as the gateway to a status symbol. As he puts it, "Licences to crenellate were mainly symbolic representations of lordly status: castellation was the architectural expression of noble rank."

There are over 1,500 castles in England; however, the 460 surviving licences only refer to just over 500 sites. According to Goodall, this undermines the assertion that builders had to seek permission from the Crown. Moreover, requests were rarely refused. Licences indicated to the observer that the grantee had obtained "royal recognition, acknowledgement and compliment."

At Cooling Castle in Kent, a brass plaque on the outer gatehouse, an engraved charter of 1381, reads, "I am made in the help of the country." In the opinion of archaeologist Matthew Johnson, the castle's defences are a sham, as there was no room for a parapet on top of the walls, and the gunports of the inner gatehouse were impractical. The architecture is effectively a boast of military importance, as is the licence.

The castle's defences could, however, act as a deterrent against wandering bands of thieves, and Davis has suggested that the function of battlements was comparable to the modern practice of householders fitting highly visible CCTV and burglar alarms, often merely dummies.

== See also ==
- List of licences to crenellate
- Adulterine castles, those built without licence

== Bibliography ==
- Coulson, Charles (1982), "Hierarchism in Conventual Crenellation" (PDF), Medieval Archaeology, 26: 69–100, doi:10.1080/00766097.1982.11735438
- Davis, Philip (2006–2007), "English Licences to Crenellate: 1199-1567'" (PDF), The Castle Studies Group Journal, 20: 226–245
- Eales, Richard, 2003, "Royal power and castles in Norman England", in Liddiard, Robert (ed.) Anglo-Norman Castles, Woodbridge: Boydell & Brewer. pp. 41–68
- Goodall, John, 2011, The English Castle, London: Yale Books. ISBN 978-0-300-11058-6.
- Johnson, Matthew, 2002, Behind the Castle Gate: From Medieval to Renaissance, London: Routledge, ISBN 0-415-25887-1
- Liddiard, Robert, 2005, Castles in Context: Power, Symbolism and Landscape, 1066 to 1500, Macclesfield: Windgather Press Ltd. ISBN 0-9545575-2-2
