= Holkham Hall =

18th-century house in Norfolk, England

Coordinates: 52°57′00″N 00°48′11″E

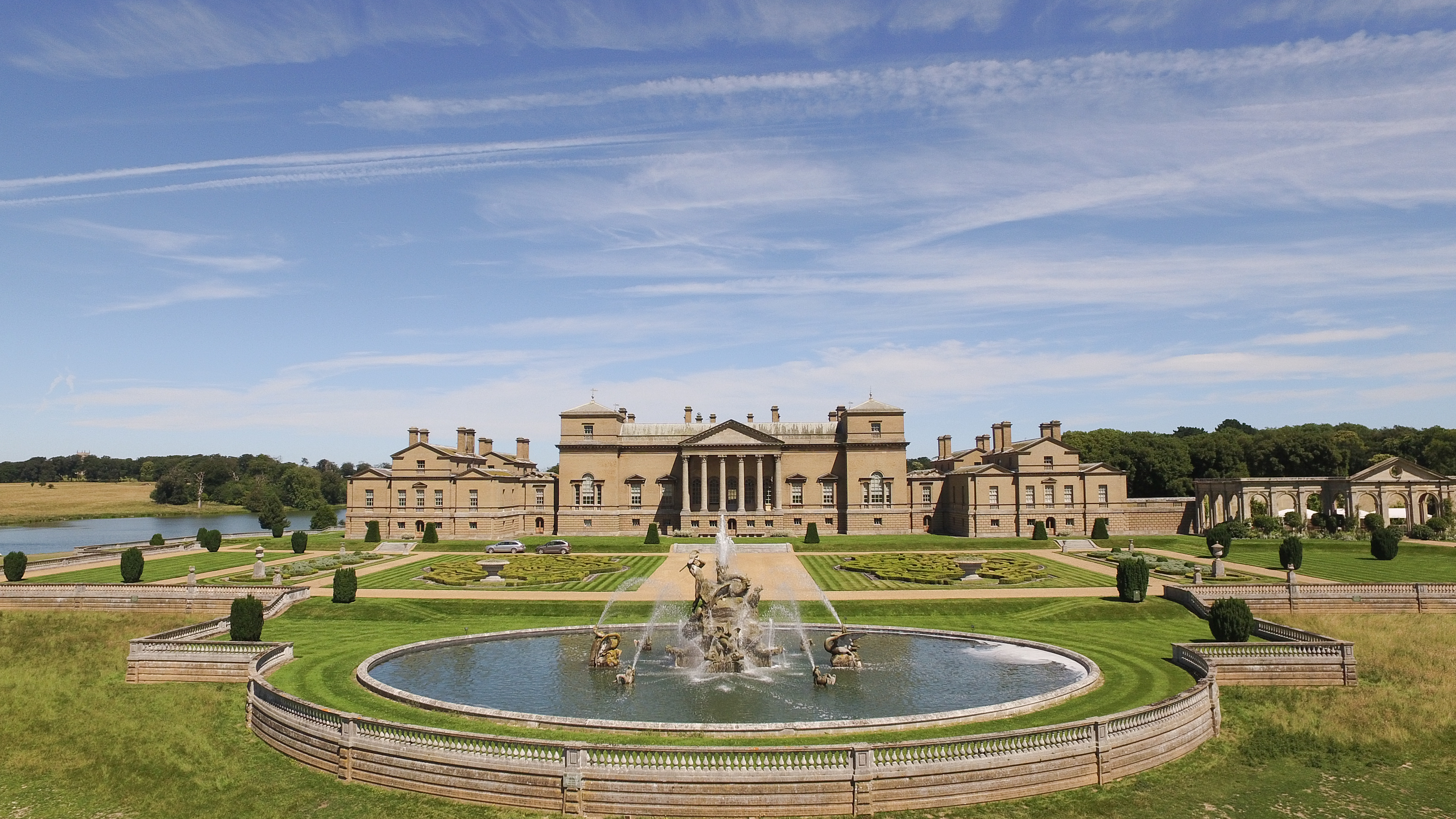
Holkham Hall. The severely Palladian south facade with its Ionic portico is devoid of arms or motif; not even a blind window is allowed to break the void between the windows and roof-line, while the lower windows are mere piercings in the stark brickwork. The only hint of ornamentation is from the two terminating Venetian windows.

Holkham Hall (/ˈhoʊkəm/ or /ˈhɒlkəm/) is an 18th-century country house near the village of Holkham, Norfolk, England, constructed in the Neo-Palladian style for Thomas Coke, 1st Earl of Leicester (of the fifth creation of the title). (Note: Thomas Coke, 1st Earl of Leicester (fifth creation)(1697–1759), the builder of Holkham, should not be confused with his great-nephew Thomas Coke, 1st Earl of Leicester (seventh creation), the celebrated agrarian known as "Coke of Norfolk", who also lived at Holkham Hall. Thomas Coke, 1st Earl of Leicester (builder of Holkham), died without surviving sons, hence his earldom terminated. Holkham subsequently passed to Thomas Coke's nephew Wenman Roberts who assumed the Coke surname but could not inherit the title. It was Roberts's son, Thomas Coke, born in 1754, for whom the title "Earl of Leicester, of Holkham in the County of Norfolk", was created in 1837. The new title was an honour granted in recognition of Coke's services to politics and agriculture. As this earldom was of a new creation, he too became the 1st Earl. It is his descendant Thomas Coke, 8th Earl of Leicester, who resides at Holkham today. The Earldom of Leicester has been, to date, created seven times. The surname "Coke" is pronounced "Cook".) The hall was designed by the architect William Kent, with contributions from Richard Boyle, 3rd Earl of Burlington, the Norfolk architect and surveyor, Matthew Brettingham and Coke himself.

Holkham is one of England's finest examples of the Palladian Revival style of architecture, and the severity of its design is closer to Andrea Palladio's ideals than many of the other numerous Palladian houses of the period. The exterior consists of a central block, of two storeys and constructed of brick, and four flanking wings. The interior of the hall is opulent, but by the standards of the day, simply decorated and furnished. Ornament is used with such restraint that it was possible to decorate both private and state rooms in the same style, without oppressing the former. The principal entrance is through the Marble Hall, which is in fact made of pink Derbyshire alabaster; this leads to the piano nobile, or the first floor, and state rooms. The most impressive of these rooms is the Saloon, which has walls lined with red velvet. Each of the major state rooms is symmetrical in its layout and design; in some rooms, false doors are necessary to fully achieve this balanced effect. The four pavilions at each corner of the central block provide space for private, family accommodation, a guest wing, a chapel and the kitchens.

The question of who designed Holkham has challenged architectural historians, and contemporaries, almost since the time of the hall's construction. The clerk-of-works, Matthew Brettingham, claimed authorship when he published The Plans, Elevations and Sections, of Holkham in Norfolk in 1761. This claim was immediately challenged by Horace Walpole, who attributed the designs to William Kent. Brettingham's son, Matthew the Younger, acknowledged in a later addition of his father's work that, "the general idea [for Holkham] was first struck out by the Earls of Leicester and Burlington, assisted by Mr. William Kent". Later historians have debated the exact contributions of Burlington, and of Coke himself, with those writing in the early 20th century generally downplaying the roles of both, while those writing later in the 20th and in the 21st centuries have found evidence of greater involvement, at least of Coke. The exact role Brettingham played in the origination, rather than the execution, of the design remains uncertain.

The Holkham estate was built up by Sir Edward Coke, a lawyer in the reigns of Elizabeth I and James I and VI and the founder of his family's fortune. It remains the ancestral home of the Coke family, who became Earls of Leicester. The house is a Grade I listed building, and its park is listed, also at Grade I, on the Register of Historic Parks and Gardens of Special Historic Interest in England.

== Inspiration: Patron and Palladio ==
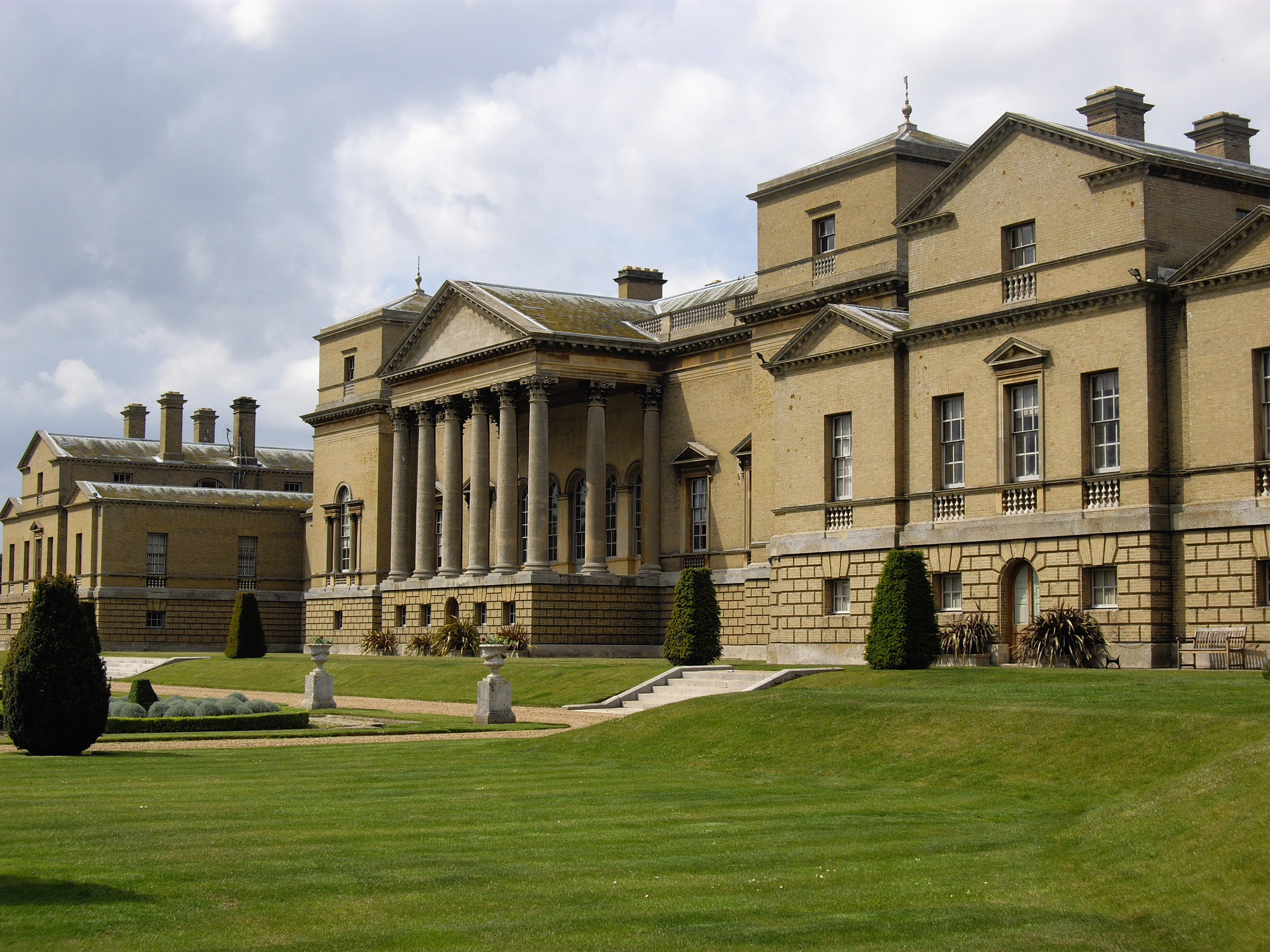
Holkham Hall. Top right: One of the four identical secondary wings

The originator of Palladianism, Andrea Palladio was born in Padua in 1508, the son of a stonemason. He was inspired by Roman buildings, by the writings of Vitruvius (80 BC), and by his immediate predecessors Donato Bramante and Raphael. He aspired to an architectural style that used symmetry and proportion to emulate the grandeur of classical buildings. Palladio recorded and publicised his work in the four-volume illustrated study, I Quattro Libri dell'Architettura (The Four Books of Architecture), published in 1570. The style made a brief appearance in England before the Civil War when it was introduced by Inigo Jones, but its monarchical associations soon saw it eclipsed by the Baroque style. Its revival some 70 years later was driven by an influential group of aristocrats of Whig political persuasion, such as Lord Burlington, who sought to identify themselves with the Romans of antiquity, and who viewed the Baroque with suspicion, considering it "theatrical, exuberant and Catholic". However, the style did not fully adhere to Palladio's strict rules of proportion. Burlington put together a collection of Palladio's drawings and published them in 1730. The style eventually evolved into what is generally referred to as Georgian, and neo-Georgian remains a popular and commonly deployed style in the 21st century. Palladianism was the chosen style for numerous houses in both town and country, although Holkham is exceptional for both its severity of design and for drawing so heavily and so directly on Palladian examples.

Holkham Hall was built by Thomas Coke, 1st Earl of Leicester, who was born in 1697. A cultivated and wealthy man, Coke made the Grand Tour in his youth and was away from England for six years between 1712 and 1718. It is likely he met both Burlington, the aristocratic architect at the forefront of the Palladian revival movement in England, and William Kent, then a young artist dependent on the patronage of a number of wealthy sponsors including Burlington, in Italy in around 1715, and that it was in Italy, the home of Palladianism, that the idea of the mansion at Holkham was first conceived. Coke returned to England in 1718, not only with a newly acquired library, but also an art and sculpture collection with which to furnish his planned new mansion. On his return his dissolute lifestyle, focussed on drinking, gambling, hunting, and cockfighting, delayed progress. Funding was also a serious issue; Coke had made a major investment in the South Sea Company and when the South Sea Bubble burst in 1720, the resultant losses delayed the building of Coke's planned new country estate for over ten years. Created Earl of Leicester in 1744, Coke died in 1759, five years before the completion of Holkham, having never fully recovered his financial losses. His widow, Margaret (1700–1775), oversaw the finishing and furnishing of the house.

== Design: architects and attributions ==
Simplified, unscaled plan of the piano nobile at Holkham, showing the four symmetrical wings at each corner of the principal block. South is at the top of the plan. 'A' Marble Hall; 'B' The Saloon; 'C' Statue Gallery, with octagonal tribunes at each end; 'D' Dining room (the classical apse, gives access to the tortuous and discreet route by which the food reached the dining room from the distant kitchen), 'E' The South Portico; 'F' The Library in the self-contained family wing IV. 'L' Green State Bedroom; 'O' Chapel.

Coke's six-year sojourn in Europe, where he studied Palladio's buildings and took instruction in drawing, had given him a clear idea as to the kind of house he wanted to build. The concept was further refined through his friendship with Burlington, whose approval he craved; and through his connection with William Kent, who had returned to England with Coke, had remained in contact with him, and who, with Burlington's support, had become the Palladian style's "most brilliant exponent". To bring the concept to fruition, Coke engaged a number of architects. The first of these was Colen Campbell, who had published the volume, Vitruvius Britannicus (The British Architect), in 1715. (Note: Modern scholarship suggests that Campbell's talents as a copyist and self-publicist exceeded his architectural ability. John Harris, in his 1995 catalogue The Palladian Revival, accuses Campbell of "outrageous plagiari[sm]".) The series contained architectural prints of British buildings inspired by the great architects from Vitruvius to Palladio; at first mainly those of Inigo Jones, but the later works contained drawings and plans by Campbell and other 18th-century architects. While Campbell received payments from Coke in the early 1720s, it would appear that these were for a limited number of drawings, although there is evidence that Campbell visited the estate in 1729.

The oldest existing working and construction plans for Holkham were drawn by Matthew Brettingham, under Coke's supervision, in 1726. These followed the guidelines and ideals for the house as defined by Kent and Burlington. Brettingham was a local Norfolk architect, builder and surveyor, who was employed as the on-site clerk of works. Already engaged as the estate's architect, he was in receipt of £50 a year (about 9,000 pounds per year in 2025 terms) in return for "taking care of his Lordship's buildings". He was also influential in the design of the mansion, although he attributed the design of the Marble Hall to Coke himself. Brettingham described the building of Holkham as "the great work of [my life]", and when he published his "The Plans and Elevations of the late Earl of Leicester's House at Holkham", he described himself as sole architect, making no mention of Kent's involvement. (Note: The centuries-long debate on the actual authorship of the designs for Holkham began almost with the completion of the building. Writing in response to Brettingham's publication, Horace Walpole expressed outrage at the latter's claims; "How the designs of that house [Holkham], which I have seen an hundred times in Kent's original drawings, came to be published under another name, and without the slightest mention of the real architect, is beyond my comprehension".) However, in a later edition of the book, Brettingham's son admitted that "the general idea was first struck out by the Earls of Leicester and Burlington, assisted by Mr. William Kent".

In 1734, the first foundations were laid; however, building was to continue for thirty years, until the completion of the great house in 1764. Kent was largely responsible for the external appearance of Holkham; he based his design on Palladio's unbuilt Villa Mocenigo, as it appears in I Quattro Libri dell'Architettura but with modifications. (Note: Sir John Summerson, while accepting the central position of Villa Mocenigo as the main inspiration for the "villa-with-wings" design of Holkham, stressed that the design of the wings, and in particular the short galleries which link them to the main block, is essentially "unPalladian; it could hardly be otherwise, for the wings of Palladio's villas consist of granaries, stables and the like, while those at Holkham are in effect subsidiary residences or contain such important apartments as the chapel and library".) (Note: Nikolaus Pevsner and Bill Wilson also suggest parallels with Palladio's Villa Trissino at Meledo.) He was also mainly responsible for the interiors of the Southwest pavilion, or family wing block, particularly the Long Library. The architectural historian Frank Salmon is certain that Kent, while influenced by others principally Coke, was the ultimate originator of the designs of Holkham as executed. Kent had earlier gained considerable experience on his move from artist to building and landscape architect at other houses in Norfolk and elsewhere, including at Raynham Hall and Houghton Hall.

The exact influences on the design of Lord Burlington and Coke has been much debated; writing in 1974, Rudolf Wittkower noted that "the history of Holkham has not yet been worked out in detail and Kent's debt to the two noblemen has not been solved". Wittkower pointed to Burlington's innovative design for the four wings at Tottenham House in Wiltshire as evidence of his influence at Holkham. However, John Harris writing in the 1990s, demonstrated that Burlington's designs for the Tottenham wings post-dated those of Kent's for Holkham. Examples of Burlington's style are nonetheless numerous; John Julius Norwich notes the Venetian windows, the general severity of the design, and the "stacatto treatment of the elevation(s)" as all characteristic of Burlington's designs at Chiswick and elsewhere. Moreover, the contemporary critic Lord Hervey wrote in 1731 of Coke having shown him the designs for "a Burlington house with four pavilions on paper" but it is not certain that this was a plan for Holkham. Timothy Mowl, in his biography of Kent published in 2006, suggests a greater role for Coke, working with Brettingham in the design of the central block, but firmly attributes the sole responsibility for the pavilions to Kent. Bill Wilson, reviewing the most recent evidence available when revising the Norfolk 2: North-West and South volume in the Pevsner Buildings of England series in 2002, suggests that Coke's input was central, "in consultation with Lord Burlington, employing first Brettingham as a draughtsman and supervisor, and later Kent in a more responsible role". In 1997 the Holkham archivist Christine Hiskey published a paper The Building of Holkham Hall: Newly Discovered Letters in the journal Architectural History, in which she outlined details of a cache of twelve letters from Coke to Brettingham covering the period 1734 to 1741. In the first letter Coke writes of having received Burlington's approval for "our whole design", indicating that the earliest plans for the central block, without the four flanking pavilions, were drawn up by Coke and Brettingham. Hiskey concludes that the two "worked closely together on the planning of the house, no less than its execution". As Hiskey acknowledged, however, the letters by no means fully clarify the individual contributions; the letter of 27 November 1733 continues, "he [Burlington] says the insides plan is the best he ever saw. Kent's outside is also vastly in favour & the going up steps from the hall also"...

In her book on the hall, published in 2016, Hiskey expands further on the case for Coke's direct involvement. She identifies two main points of evidence, from her work in the Holkham archive. The first is the four purchases of drawing materials and mathematical instruments, "for his lordship's use", at key points in the genesis of Holkham: immediately after his return from the Grand Tour in 1720; in 1731 when the plan with four wings was drawn up; in 1734, when work began on the Family Wing; and from 1739, when construction commenced on the main block. Of equal importance was Coke's decision to base himself at Holkham for a period of twenty months, from July 1731 to February 1733, the longest unbroken period of time he spent on the estate in his life. Hiskey suggests this indicates the importance he attached to being on site while the plans for the house were worked up, and that it would have enabled regular contact with Matthew Brettingham, who was based at Norwich.

The authorship debate continues in the 21st century, stimulated in part by an important exhibition focussed on Kent, William Kent: Designing Georgian Britain held in New York and London in 2013–2014. In a series of articles published by the Georgian Group and in Architectural History, Salmon debated the issue with the curator Leo Schmidt, whose doctoral thesis was on the architecture of Holkham. Schmidt had earlier sought to argue for a greater early involvement for both Brettingham and Coke, and for Campbell, in plans for the house he termed 'Holkham 1', undertaken in the mid-1720s. While acknowledging Coke's contribution, Salmon's articles dismissed the 'Holkham 1' theory and contended that it was above all Kent, and not Campbell nor Brettingham, who was most capable of, and who was responsible for, the overall design.

== The house: outside and in ==
The plans for Holkham were of a large central block of two floors only, containing on the piano nobile level a series of symmetrically balanced state rooms situated around two courtyards. No hint of these courtyards is given externally; they are intended for lighting rather than recreation or architectural value. This great central block is flanked by four smaller, rectangular blocks, or wings, that are linked to the main house not by long colonnades—as would have been the norm in Palladian architecture—but by short two-storey wings of only one bay. The total cost of the construction of Holkham is thought to have been in the region of £90,000, (about 14,192,000 pounds in 2025 terms). In their study of the costs of country house building, Wilson and Mackley detail the known costs of a number of 18th-century English houses; Holkham tops the list at £92,000; followed by Moor Park at £86,000; Wentworth Woodhouse at £80,000; Castle Howard at £78,000; and Kedleston Hall at £70,000.

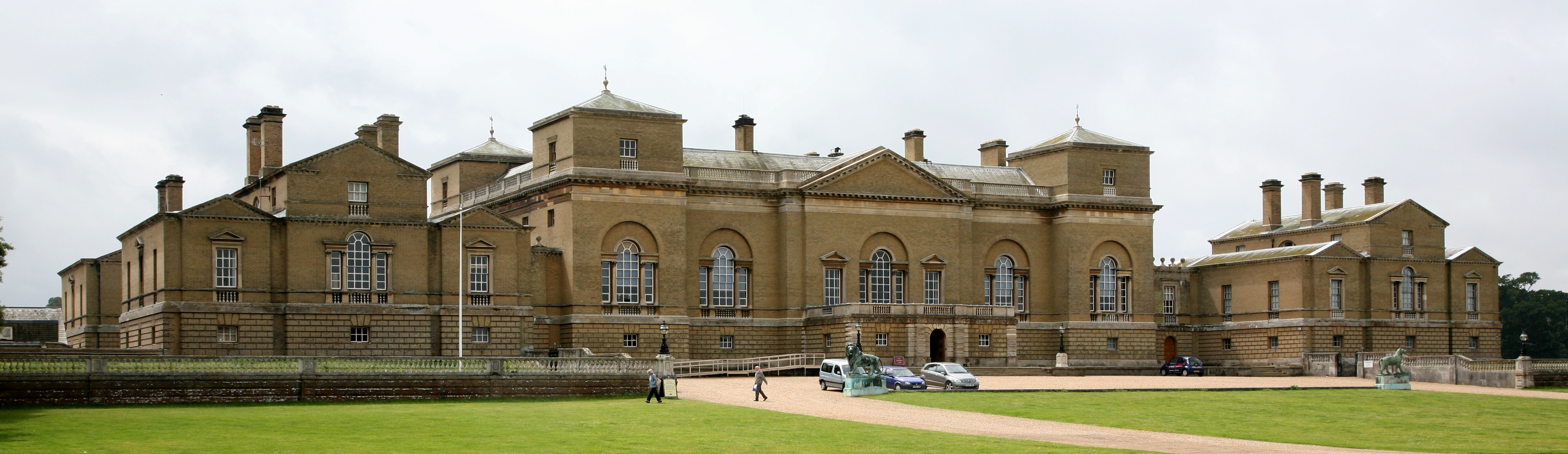
The north front showing, left and right, the single-bay wings which link the main block to the northern pavilions

=== Exterior ===
The external appearance of Holkham can best be described as a huge Roman palace. While a Palladian house, even by Palladian standards the external appearance is unusually austere and devoid of ornamentation. This can almost certainly be traced to Coke himself. The on-site, supervising architect, Matthew Brettingham, related that Coke required and demanded "commodiousness", which can be interpreted as comfort. Hence rooms that were adequately lit by one window, had only one, as a second might have improved the external appearance but could have made a room cold or draughty. As a result, the few windows on the piano nobile, although symmetrically placed and balanced, appear lost in a sea of brickwork; albeit these yellow bricks were cast as exact replicas of ancient Roman bricks expressly for Holkham. Coke had originally intended to face the house with Bath Stone. When this proved too expensive, Coke turned to his own brick manufactory. (Note: Christine Hiskey, in her study of the house, devotes a chapter to the craftsmen who worked on it. Her analysis of the Holkham archive shows the "striking continuity" and longevity of many of the relationships between Thomas Coke and his employees; two of the lead bricklayers, Robert Jackson and John Elliot, began working at the hall in the early 1730s and were still engaged after the earl's death in 1759.) The effect has been subject to criticism; John Julius Norwich wrote of the "unhealthy liverish colour" of the façades, while Sacheverell Sitwell condemned the "ugly and mechanical rustication" and the "depressing white brick". Above the windows of the piano nobile, where on a true Palladian structure the windows of a mezzanine would be, there is nothing. The reason for this is the double height of the state rooms on the piano nobile; however, not even a blind window, such as those often seen in Palladio's own work, is permitted to alleviate the severity of the façade. On the ground floor, the rusticated walls are pierced by small windows more reminiscent of an institution than a grand house; one architectural commentator, Nigel Nicolson, described the exterior, on first impression, as akin to a Prussian riding school.

The principal, or South façade, is 344 feet (104.9 m) in length (from each of the flanking wings to the other), its austerity relieved on the piano nobile level only by a great six-columned portico. Each end of the central block is terminated by a slight projection, containing a Venetian window surmounted by a single storey square tower and capped roof, similar to those employed by Inigo Jones at Wilton House nearly a century earlier. (Note: A near identical portico was designed by Inigo Jones and Isaac de Caus for the Palladian front at Wilton, but this was never executed.) The one storey porch at the main north entrance was designed in the 1850s by Samuel Sanders Teulon, although stylistically it is indistinguishable from the 18th-century building. The architectural historian Mark Girouard praised the "admirably self-effacing" Victorian additions. (Note: Mark Girouard's comment appears in his chapter "Living with the past: Victorian alterations to the country house" in the volume The Future of the Past: Attitudes to Conservation 1174–1974.)

The flanking wings contain service and secondary rooms—the family wing to the south-west; the guest wing to the north-west; the chapel wing to the south-east; and the kitchen wing to the north-east. Each wing's external appearance is identical: three bays, each separated from the other by a narrow recess in the elevation. Each bay is surmounted by an unadorned pediment. One of these wings, as at the later Kedleston Hall, was a self-contained country house to accommodate the family when the state rooms and central block were not in use.

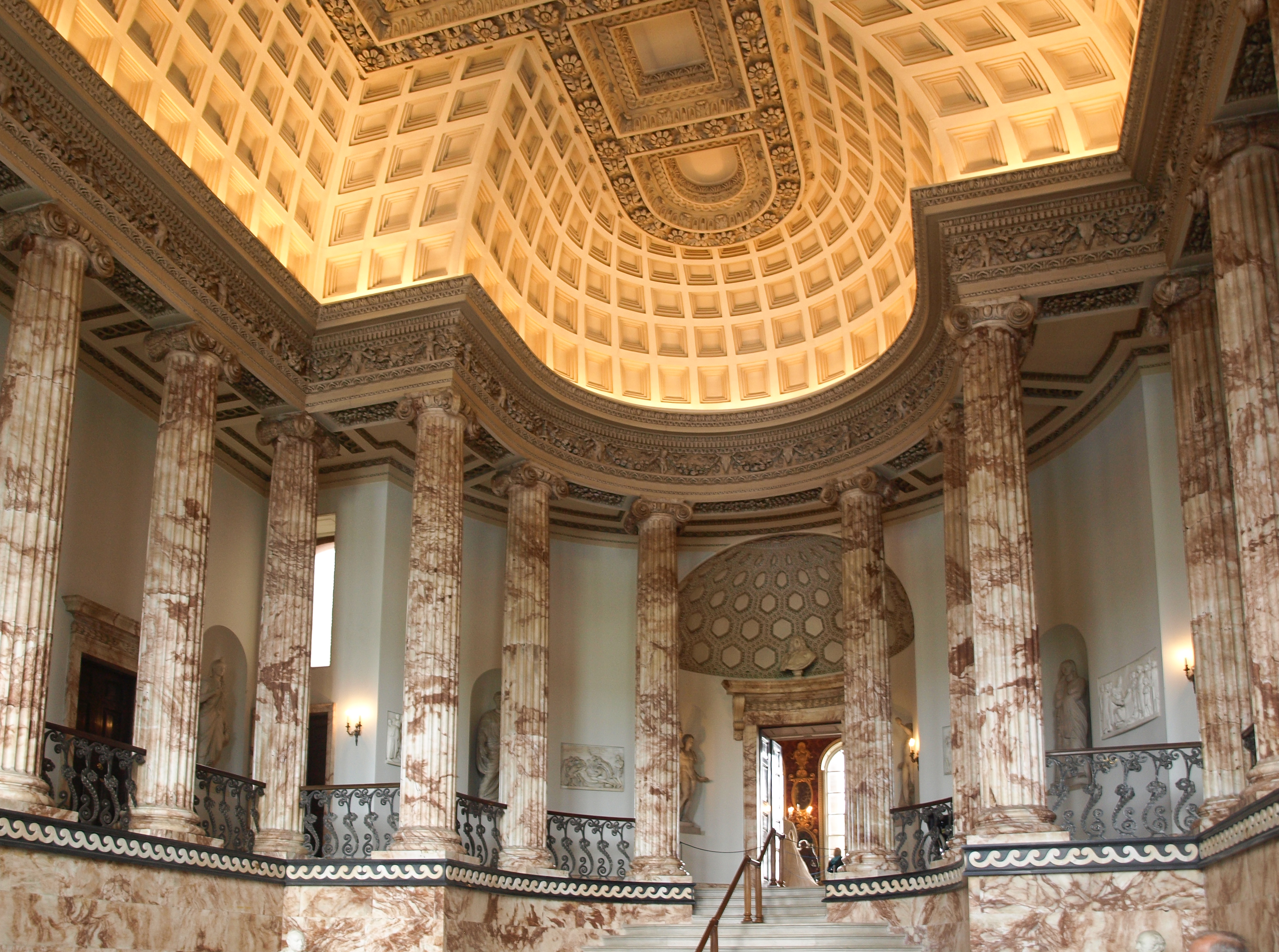
The Marble Hall

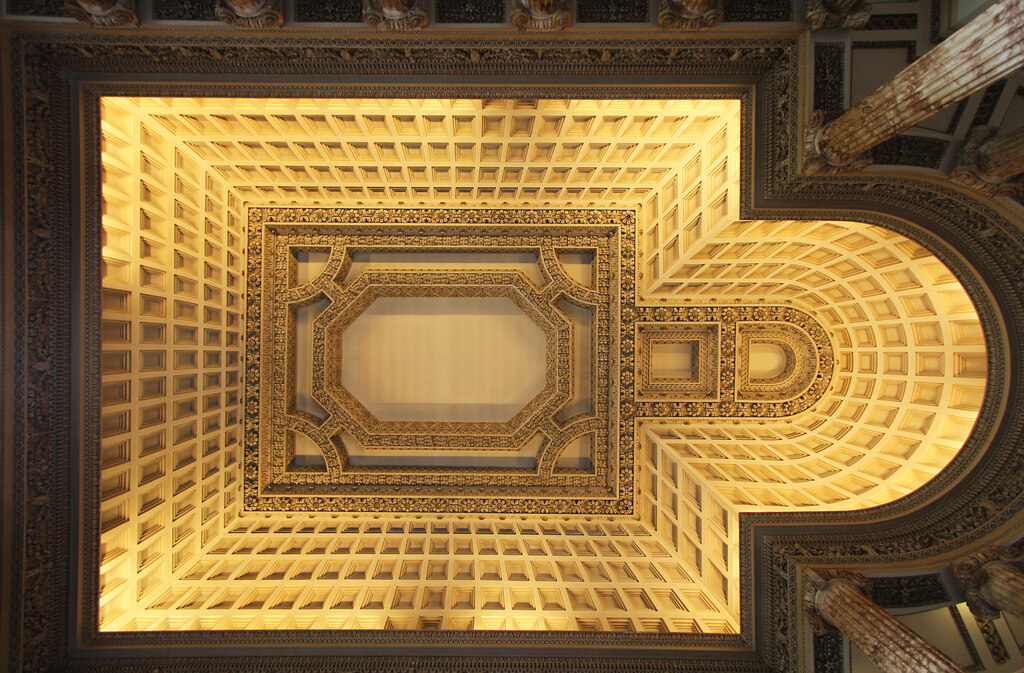
The Marble Hall ceiling

=== Interior ===
Nicolson considered Holkham to have "the finest Palladian interior" in the country. Its grandeur is obtained with an absence of excessive ornament, and reflects Kent's career-long taste for "the eloquence of a plain surface". Work on the interiors ran from 1739 to 1773. The first habitable rooms were in the family wing and were in use from 1740, the Long Library being the first major room completed in 1741. Kent's design of the library was unusual in that it formed part of Coke's private, family, apartments in the south-west wing, rather than acting as one of the state rooms in the main block. Among the last to be completed and entirely under Lady Leicester's supervision is the chapel of 1760.

==== Marble Hall ====
The house is entered through the Marble Hall modelled by Kent on a Roman basilica. The room is over 50 feet (15 m) from floor to ceiling and is dominated by the broad white marble flight of steps leading to the surrounding gallery, or peristyle: here alabaster clad Ionic columns support the coffered, gilded ceiling, copied from a design by Inigo Jones, inspired by the Pantheon in Rome. (Note: Wilson and Pevsner suggest Lord Burlington's York Assembly Rooms as another possible inspiration.) The chief building fabric is in fact pink Derbyshire alabaster. The fluted columns are thought to be replicas of those in the Temple of Fortuna Virilis, also in Rome. Around the hall are statues in niches; these are predominantly plaster copies of classical deities. Sacheverell Sitwell suggested that the Marble Hall's only rivals for grandeur in England were the halls at Kedleston and Syon, "the masterworks of Robert Adam", while Ralph Dutton posited Syon, and the Double Cube Room at Wilton House as its only competitors.

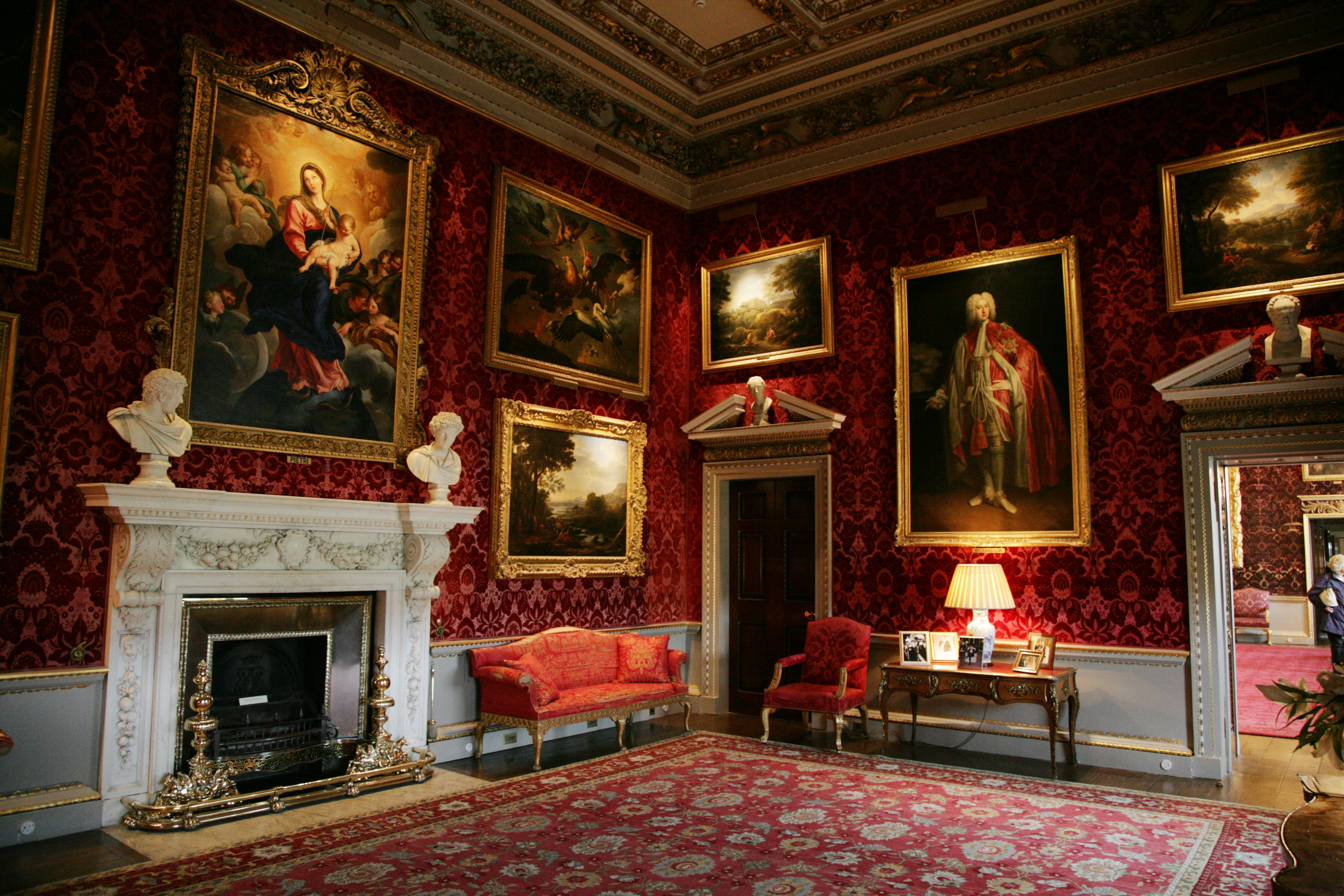
Paintings in the Saloon

==== Saloon ====
The hall's flight of steps lead to the piano nobile and state rooms. The grandest, the Saloon, is situated immediately behind the great portico, with its walls lined with patterned red caffoy, a mixture of wool, linen and silk known as Genoa velvet and another of the spoils of Coke's travels, and a coffered, gilded ceiling. In this room hangs Rubens's Return from Egypt. It also houses the Anthony van Dyck portrait of the Duke of Arenberg. Two tables designed by Kent and carved by John Michael Rysbrack have tops incorporating sections of Roman pavement excavated from Hadrian's Villa at Tivoli. Much of the furniture in the state rooms was also designed by William Kent, in a stately classicising baroque manner. So restrained, "chaste" in James Lees-Milne's terminology, is the interior decoration of the state rooms, that the smaller, more intimate rooms in the family's private south-west wing were decorated in similar vein, without being overpowering.

==== Statue Gallery ====
On his Grand Tour, the Earl acquired a collection of Roman copies of Greek and Roman sculpture which is contained in the extensive Statue Gallery, which runs the full length of the house north to south. The niches were constructed to exactly fit the statuary. Mark Girouard, writing in his study, Life in the English Country House, noted that the earl's collection of sculpture was so extensive that while much was placed in the gallery, other pieces were installed in the hall, the dining room, and elsewhere in the house. Coke's creation of the Statue Gallery represented a new aesthetic, where sculpture was actively used as "an integral part of the architectural interior".

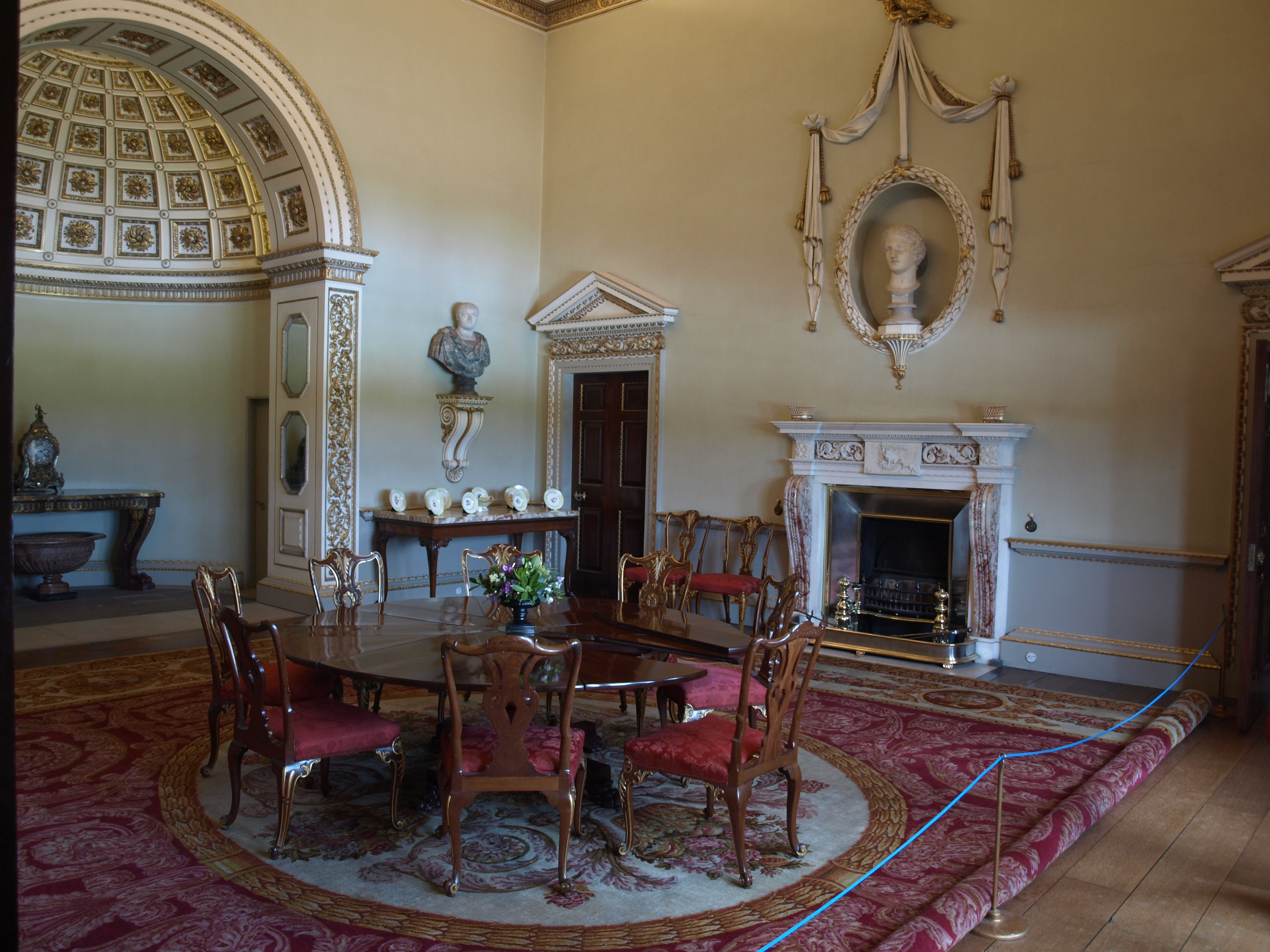
The North Dining Room

==== North State Dining room ====
The North Dining Room, a cube room of 27 feet (8.2 m) has a dome and coffered niches and arches. A classical apse gives the room an almost temple air. A bust of Aelius Verus, set in a niche is matched by one of the goddess, Juno, and another pair depict Caracalla and Marcus Aurelius. Most of these examples were bought on Coke's grand tour and he juxtaposed "good" with "bad" examples as a mark of his erudition. The walls are decorated with tapestries by Gerard Peemans, and an Axminster carpet has a design which mirrors that of the ceiling. Four doorcases with pediments give access, including from the kitchens and service areas of the house.

==== Green State Bedroom ====
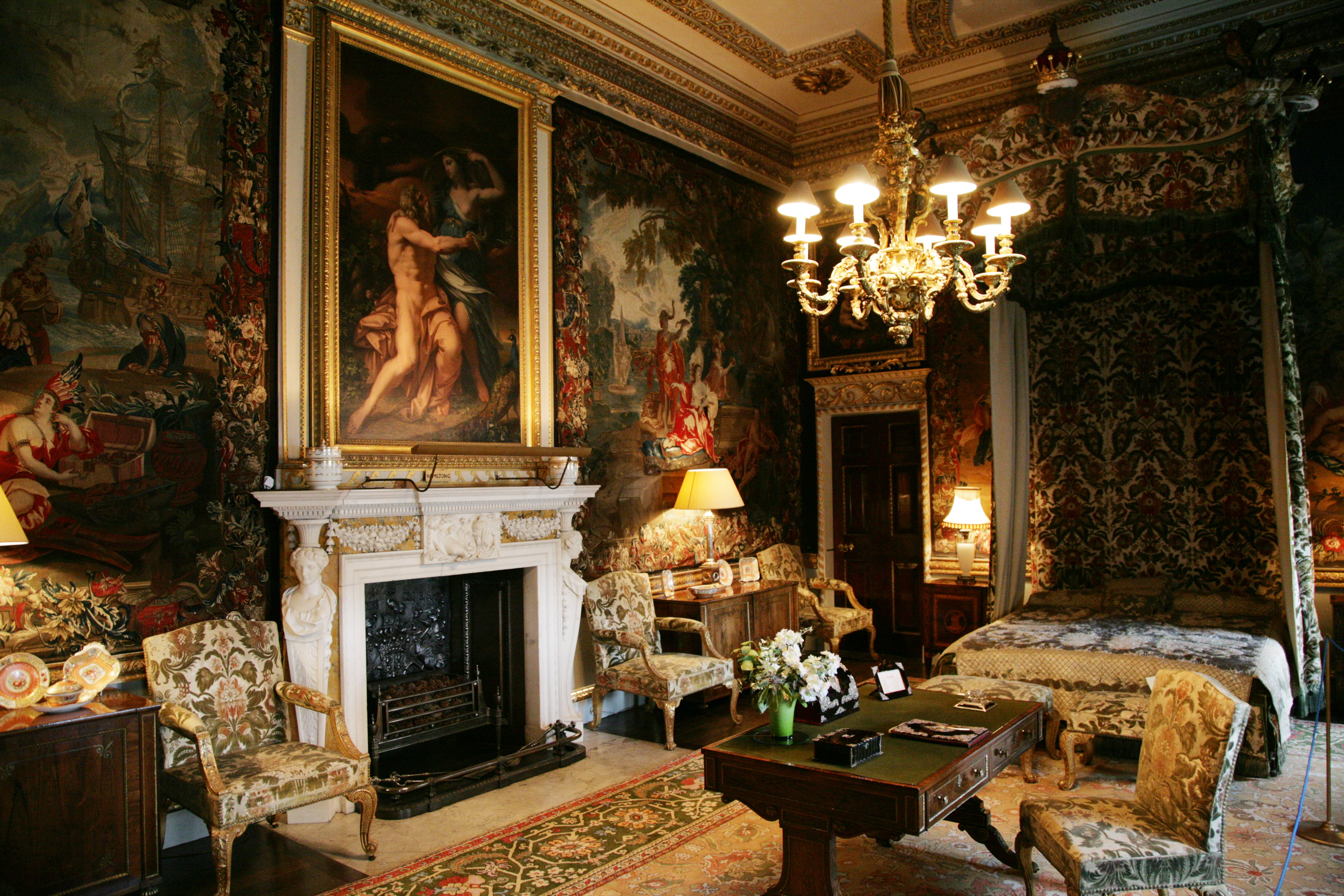
View of the Green State bedroom

The Green State bedroom is the principal bedroom; it is decorated with paintings and tapestries, including works by Paul Saunders and George Smith Bradshaw. Tapestries depicting the continents are by Albert Auwercx, a tapestry maker from Brussels. During a royal visit, when Queen Mary was allocated use of the bedroom, Gavin Hamilton's "lewd" depiction of Jupiter Caressing Juno "was considered unsuitable for that lady's eyes and was banished to the attics". The hall retains the majority of the original mid-18th century furniture commissioned by Coke.

==== Landscape room ====
Each corner of the east side of the principal block contains a square salon lit by a huge Venetian window, one of them – the Landscape Room – hung with paintings by Claude Lorrain and Gaspar Poussin. All of the major state rooms have symmetrical walls, even where this involves matching real with false doors. The major rooms also have elaborate white and multi-coloured marble fireplaces, most with carvings and sculpture, mainly the work of Thomas Carter, though Joseph Pickford carved the fireplace in the Statue Gallery.

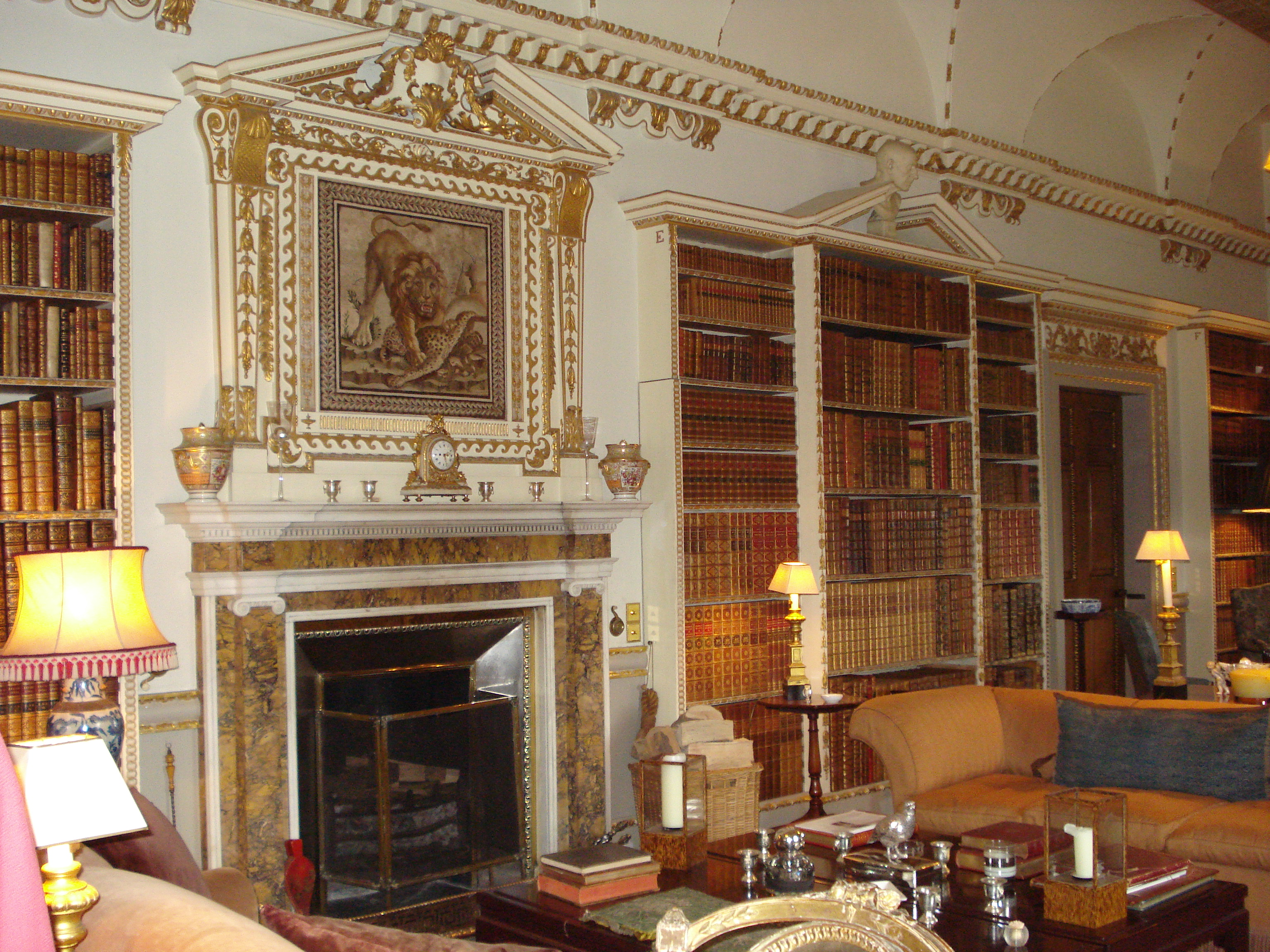
View of the library

==== Long Library ====
The Long Library runs the full length of the wing and still contains the collection of books acquired by Thomas Coke on his Grand Tour through Italy, where he saw for the first time the Palladian villas which were to inspire Holkham. Decorated by Kent, it includes a marble fireplace incorporating a Roman mosaic of a lion killing a leopard. The earliest extant architectural drawing by Kent in which he used colour is of an unexecuted decorative design for this room. The Holkham library collection remains of considerable importance; the Folger Shakespeare Library described it as "one of the finest private libraries" in England; although sales in the 19th and 20th centuries saw the disposal of some of its most rare and valuable works, such as the Codex Leicester which was sold in the 1980s. (Note: The Codex Leicester, briefly renamed the Codex Hammer, is now owned by Bill Gates.)

Holkham also holds a major private archive, containing over 100,000 documents dating from the 13th to the 21st centuries. The archive was refurbished in 2023.

== Art collection ==
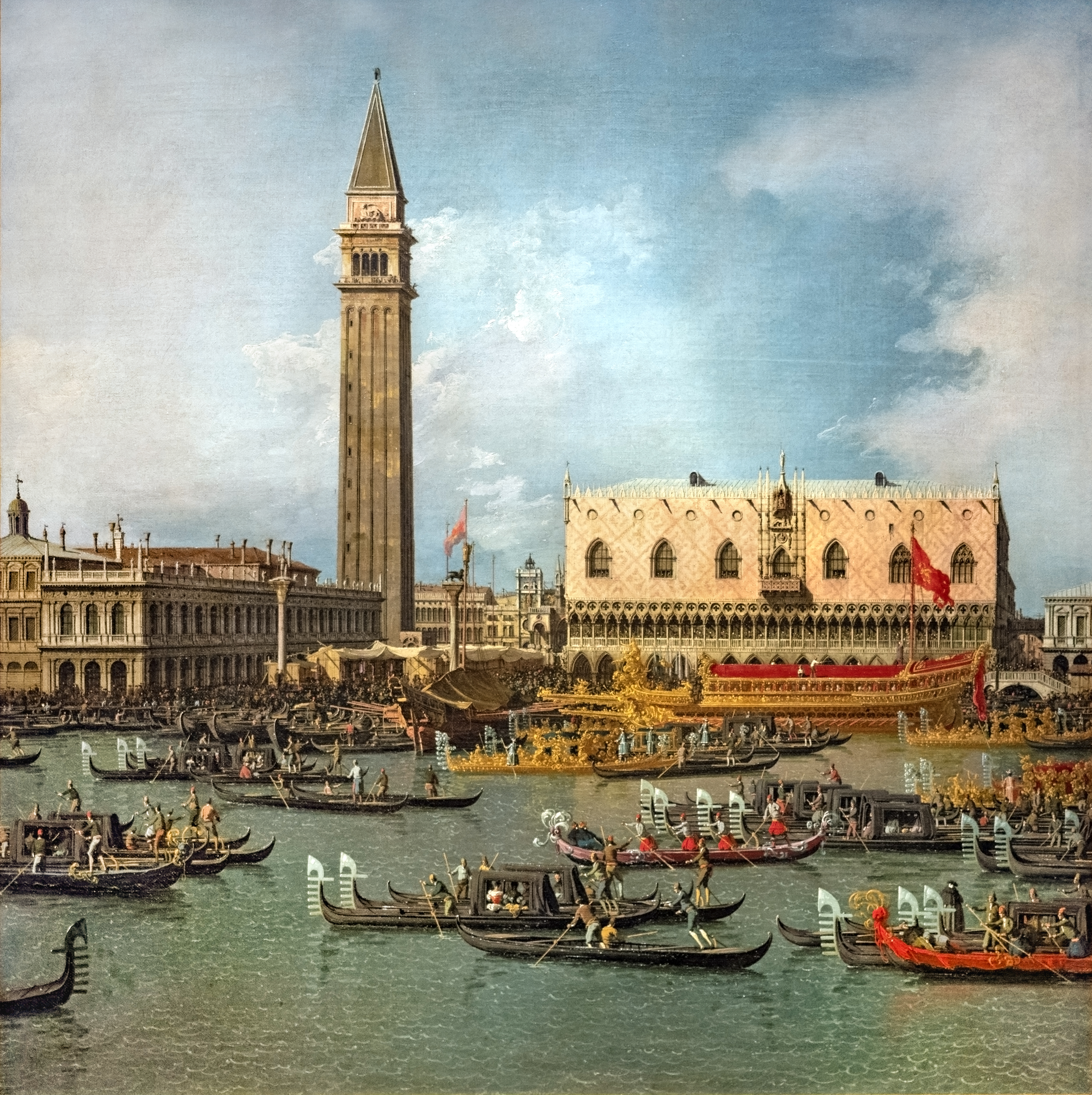
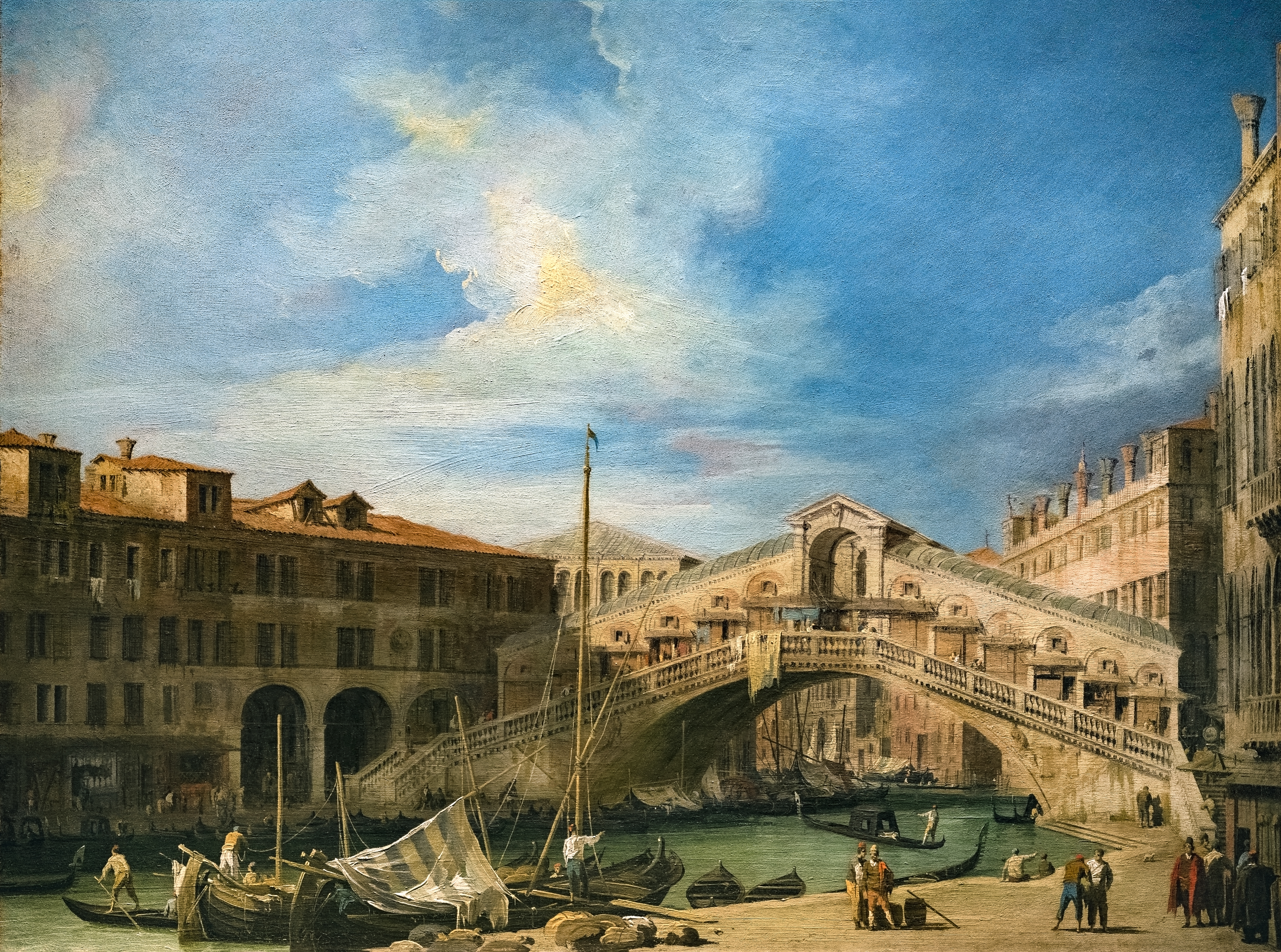
Two Canalettos. Left: The Bucentaur Returning to the Molo on Ascension Day c. 1740. Right: The Rialto Bridge from the South.

In addition to his acquisitions of statuary and antiquities, Coke's six-year Grand Tour enabled him to assemble one of the finest private art collections in the country. The collection, which remains substantially intact, includes works by Anthony van Dyck, Peter Paul Rubens, Claude Lorrain, Gaspard Dughet and Canaletto. The number of landscapes by Lorrain is exceeded only by the Louvre's collection in Paris. The collection also held Titian's Venus and the Lute Player, until it was sold to the Met in New York in 1931. A sporting portrait of 'Coke of Norfolk' by Thomas Gainsborough is a later addition to the collection. Nigel Nicolson considered Rubens' The Return of the Holy Family from Egypt the most important picture remaining at the house. Simon Jenkins described the assemblage of pictures in the Landscape Room as "without equal in an English house". Items from the collection are frequently loaned to museums and galleries worldwide. (Note: Acquisitions continue to expand the collection. In the late 20th century the 7th earl commissioned six group portraits of staff at the hall from Andrew Festing.)

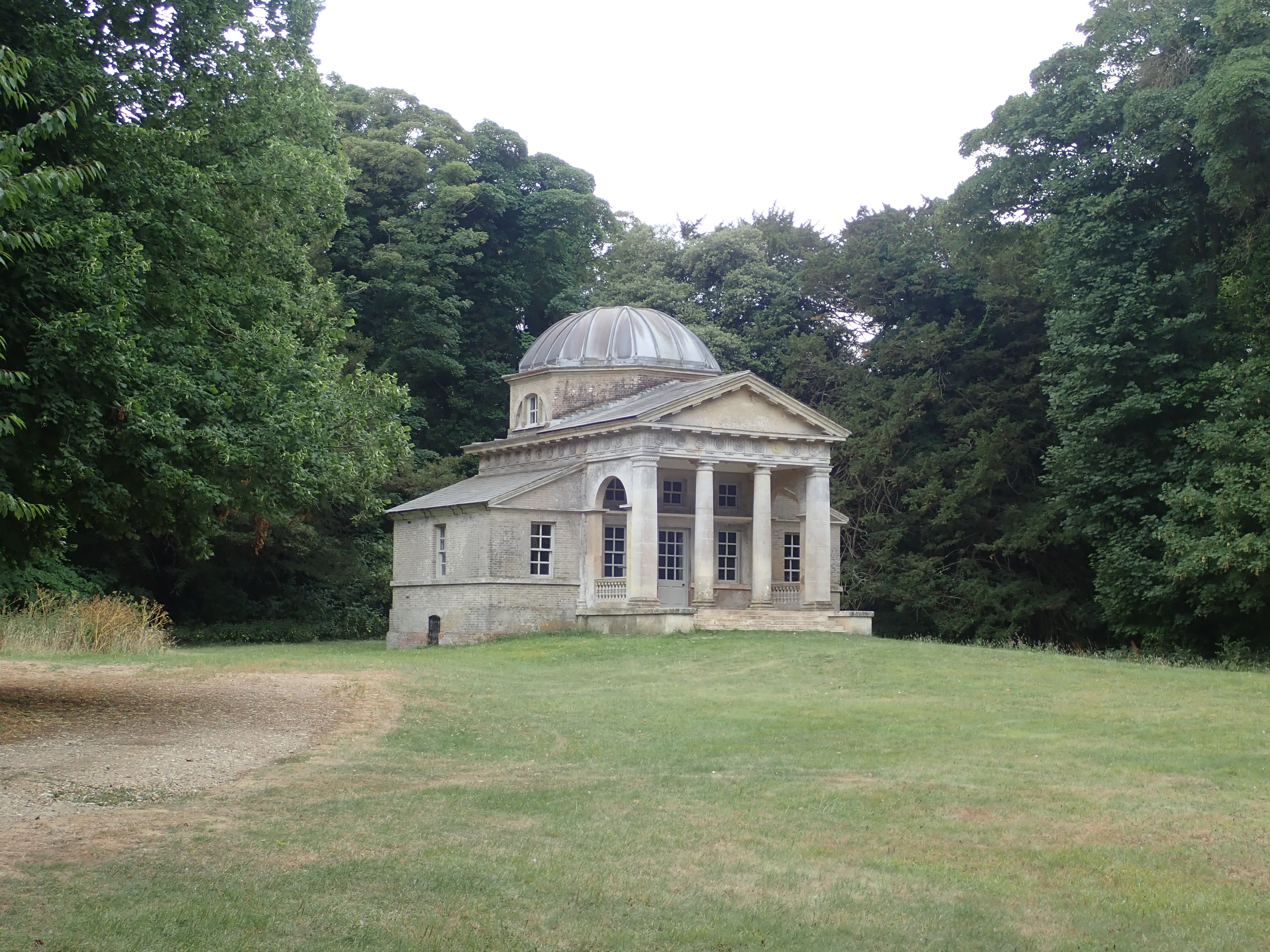
Kent's Temple

== Grounds ==
Work to the designs of William Kent on the park commenced in 1729, several years before the house was constructed. This event was commemorated by the construction in 1730 of the obelisk, 80 ft (24 m) in height, standing on the highest point in the park. It is located over half a mile to the south and on axis with the centre of the house. An avenue of trees stretches over a mile south of the obelisk. Thousands of trees were planted on what had been windswept land; by 1770 the park covered 1,500 acres (6.1 km^{2}). Other garden buildings designed by Kent are, near the far end of the avenue the Triumphal Arch, designed around 1730 but completed up to two decades later, (Note: Timothy Mowl suggests there is considerable challenge in accurately dating a number of Kent's buildings on the Holkham estate, including the Obelisk and the Triumphal Arch. He contends that the design and construction of the former was likely complete by 1729, but suggests that the latter could have been erected as late as 1765. He also notes that neither is entirely Kent's work as the "jobbing architect Matthew Brettingham made alterations" to Kent's designs.) (Note: The Triumphal Arch was renovated in the 21st century and is available to rent.) and the domed Doric Temple (1730–1735). Above the main entrance to the house within the Marble Hall is an inscribed plaque, erected by Coke's widow and inscribed with her posthumous tribute to her husband (Note: In the second of two articles on the house, published in Country Life in 2022, John Goodall wrote, "the attribution of this celebrated building, together with its landscape, to one man is self-evidently inadequate, but it is no less essentially accurate".):

THIS SEAT, on an open barren Estate
Was planned, planted, built, decorated,
And inhabited the middle of the XVIIIth Century
By THO'^{s.} COKE EARL of LEICESTER

As in the house, Margaret Coke worked to complete the grounds in accordance with her late husband's wishes. In a letter, she wrote of her, "great desire to accomplish the approaches and distant decorations of Holkham in the manner the [.] Earl designed them". She engaged Capability Brown to undertake work on the estate, putting him on an annual retainer of 50 guineas, and Brown directed efforts at Holkham from 1762 to 1764, planting trees, landscaping the ground and laying out a network of roads.

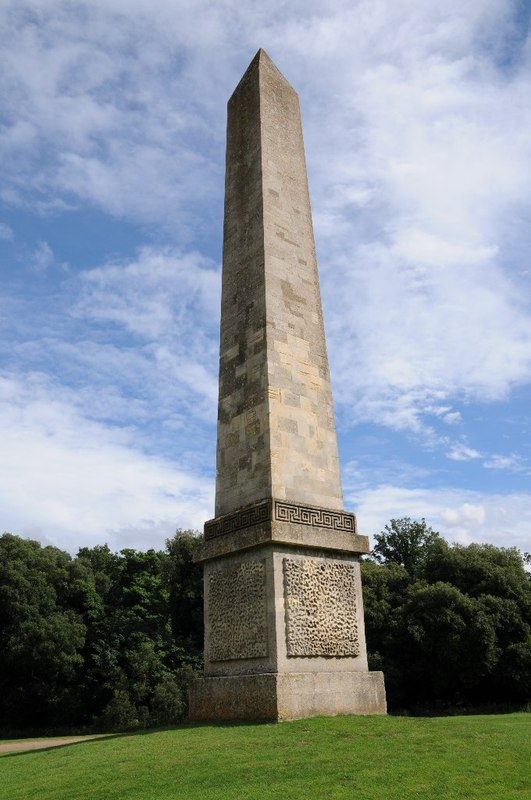
Obelisk in Holkham Park 1730

Under Coke of Norfolk, the great-nephew and heir of the builder, extensive improvements were made to the park and by his death in 1842 it had grown to its present extent of over 3,000 acres (12 km^{2}). As well as planting over a million trees on the estate Coke employed the architect Samuel Wyatt to design over 50 buildings, including a series of farm buildings and farmhouses in a simplified neo-classical style and, in the 1780s, the new walled kitchen gardens covering 6 acres (24,000 m^{2}). The walled garden was restored between 2020 and 2022. The earl's wife, "Mrs Coke", hired Humphry Repton who created a 'Red Book' full of landscape gardening ideas for Holkham. (Note: "Similarly, after the estate had been inherited by Thomas William Coke (Coke of Norfolk) the fashions in landscapes had changed and after a period of focus elsewhere on the estate, a new designer was sought: Humphry Repton...His first "Red Book" written for Holkham, uses these devices of 'plans, hints and sketches' for the creation of pleasure gardens land near the lake. It is interesting to note that the volume is addressed not to Thomas Coke, but rather Mrs Coke, his wife...") The gardens stand to the west of the lake and include: a fig house, a peach house, a vinery, and other greenhouses. Wyatt's designs culminated in c. 1790 with the Great Barn, located in the park half a mile south-east of the obelisk. The cost of each farm was in the region of £1,500 to £2,600: Lodge Farm, Castle Acre, cost £2,604 6s. 5d. in 1797–1800. The lake to the west of the house, originally a marshy inlet or creek off the North Sea, was created in 1801–1803 by the landscape gardener William Eames.

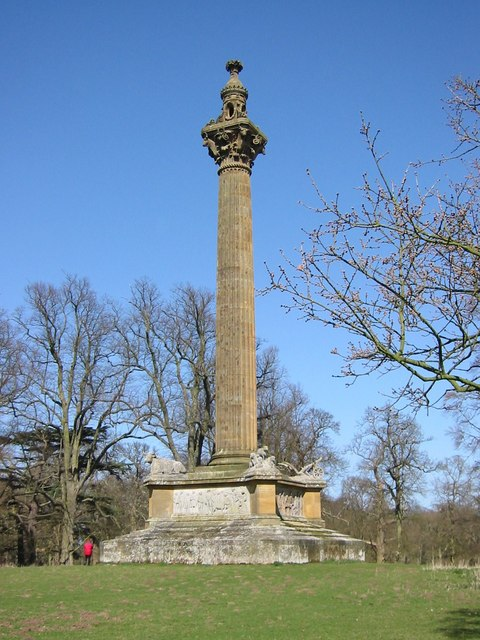
The Leicester Monument to Coke of Norfolk

After his death, Coke was commemorated by the Leicester Monument, designed by William Donthorne and erected in 1845–1848 at a cost to the tenants of the estate of £4,000. The monument consists of a Corinthian column 120 ft (37 m) high, surmounted by a drum supporting a wheatsheaf and a plinth decorated with bas-reliefs carved by John Henning Jr. The corners of the plinth support sculptures of an ox, sheep, plough and seed-drill all referencing Coke's agricultural innovations. (Note: The bowler hat was created in 1849 by James Lock & Co. for gamekeepers on the Holkham estate.)

In 1850, Thomas Coke, 2nd Earl of Leicester, called in the architect William Burn to build new stables to the east of the house, in collaboration with W. A. Nesfield, who had designed the parterres. Work started at the same time on the terraces surrounding the house. This work continued until 1857 and included, to the south and on axis with the house, the monumental fountain of Saint George and the Dragon dated c. 1849–57 and sculpted by Charles Raymond Smith. To the east of the house and overlooking the terrace, Burn designed the large stone orangery, with a three-bay pedimented centre and three-bay flanking wings. The orangery is now without its roof or its windows.

The Holkham estate is listed at Grade I on the Register of Historic Parks and Gardens of Special Historic Interest in England. The estate contains some 40 listed buildings: including the hall, the garden temple, the Triumphal arch and the Leicester Monument at the highest grade, Grade I; and the Church of St Withburga, the vinery, the obelisk, the kitchen garden, the Great Barn and the Longlands estate workshop and clock tower, all at the next highest grade, II*.

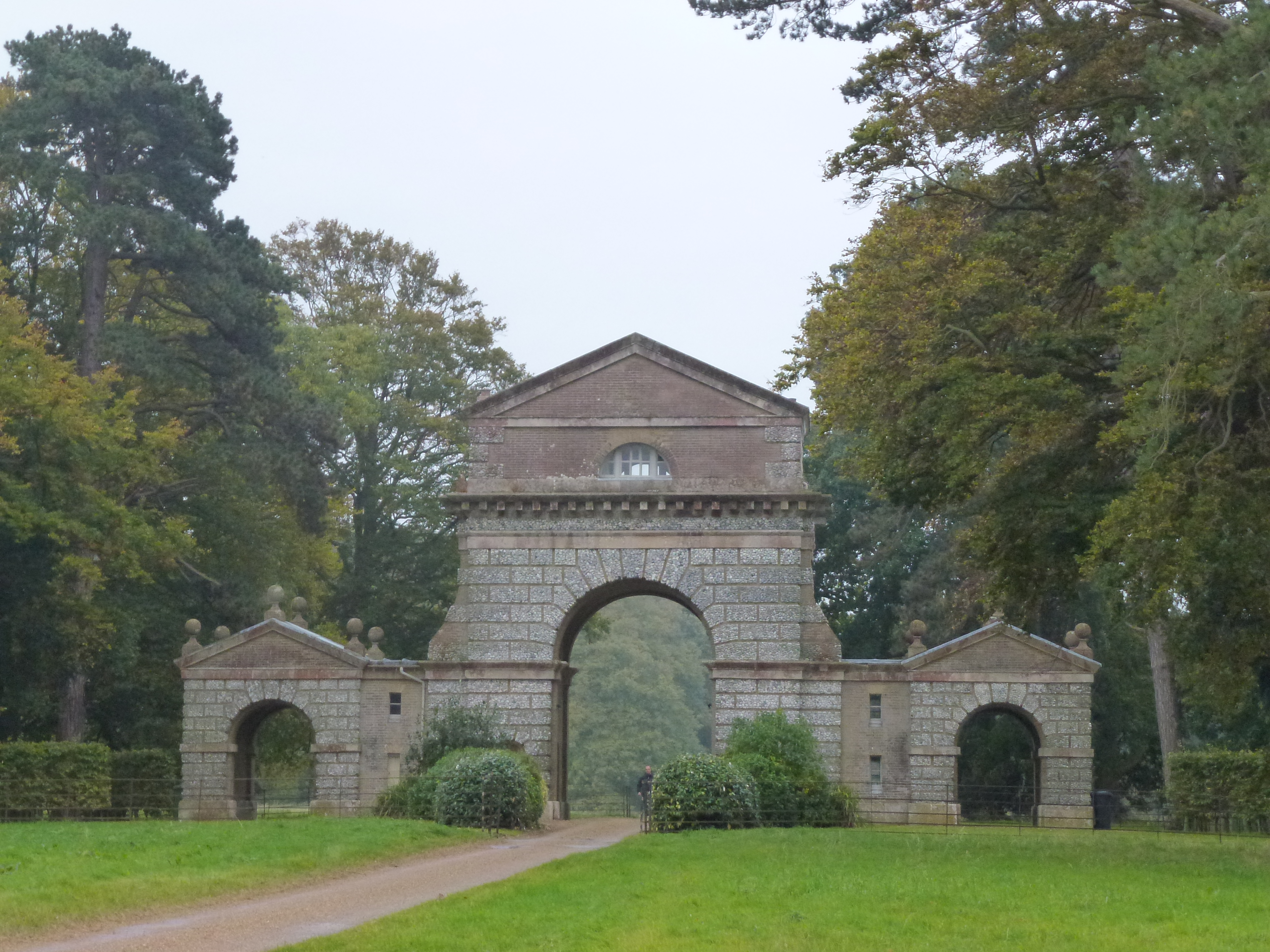
Kent's Triumphal Arch, the entrance to "Giant Castle"

== History ==
=== Cokes of Norfolk: 13th to 20th centuries ===
The Coke family is recorded as living in Norfolk in the early 13th century. The family's rise to wealth and prominence was driven by Edward Coke (1552–1634), who served as Solicitor General, Speaker of the House of Commons and Attorney General under both Elizabeth I and James I. Edward Coke amassed extensive estates in Norfolk, and elsewhere in England, but the Holkham property was a later addition, acquired through marriage by his fourth son, John. At this time, an Elizabethan house, Hill Hall, stood on the site. The estates passed down through the family, eventually descending to Thomas Coke, aged 10, on the death of his father in 1707. The creation of Holkham as a suitable home for him and for his descendants became his life's main work, and the death of his childless son Edward in 1753 left Coke disappointed and disillusioned. (Note: Although deeply saddened by his son's death, Edward's conduct in life caused Coke great concern. Refusing to consummate his marriage, he imprisoned his wife at Holkham for a year, until her mother was able to secure her release through a writ of habeas corpus. A scandalous, and very public, divorce followed.) One of his last letters was to Matthew Brettingham's son; "It is a melancholy thing to stand alone in one's own Country. I look around, not a house to be seen but my own. I am Giant, of Giant Castle, and have ate up all my neighbors—my nearest neighbour is the King of Denmark".

Coke was succeeded in 1759 by his nephew, Wenman (c. 1717–1776). However, Coke's will provided for his widow to remain at Holkham and complete the house. Margaret Coke's contribution has often been overlooked, with the suggestion that she merely presided over the furnishing of the house: in fact she oversaw the completion of many rooms, including the Marble Hall; had the stables and coach house built; and finished the landscaping of the park. Wenman's son, Thomas (1754–1842) inherited Holkham in 1776, and following a parliamentary career of modest success, and a more renowned vocation as an agrarian reformer, became known as "Coke of Norfolk", and was made Earl of Leicester of the seventh creation in 1837. Coke was devoted to Holkham; although, like his predecessors and successors, he made few changes to the house, writing, "I shall never venture rashly to interfere with the result of years of thought and study in Italy"; he did instigate major improvements to the gardens, the park and, above all, to the wider estate, where his innovations in animal husbandry, crop rotation, and the granting of unusually long leases to his tenants to encourage investment, saw the annual rent roll rise from just over £2,000 to over £20,000.

The second earl (Thomas Coke, 1822–1909) followed his father as a countryman, serving as Lord Lieutenant of Norfolk for 60 years. His successors, the third, fourth, fifth and sixth earls, were soldiers, or in the last instance a pilot, serving in the Boer War, and the First and Second World Wars. The fourth earl, Thomas Coke, (1880–1949), considered donating the hall to the National Trust but did not proceed with the plan. (Note: James Lees-Milne viewed the house as secretary of the Country Houses Committee of the National Trust in June 1947. While Lord Leicester did not take forward his plans to donate the house, Lees-Milne nevertheless recorded his view of the hall's importance; "I would definitely put Holkham among the first twenty great houses of England. With its collections it forms one very great work of art indeed".) The sixth earl, Anthony Coke (1909–1994), a cousin of the fifth earl, lived in South Africa and, on inheriting in 1976, determined not to move to England and sent his son Edward (1936–2015), to manage Holkham. (Note: Edward Coke, 7th Earl of Leicester, known as Eddy, had been envisaged as the likely heir to Holkham since the 1950s, as the fifth earl's marriage had not produced a son. The succession of an almost unknown heir caused the earl some concern and Eddy was brought to England for 'approval'. The earl's lawyer, who handled the initial meeting, reported; "[he] was intelligently inquisitive about Holkham without I think being at all prying [although he is] obviously and extremely South African".) Succeeding in 1994, the seventh earl is credited with reviving the Holkham estate; his obituary in the Daily Telegraph recorded that he transformed the hall "from a crumbling ancestral home to a major tourist attraction".

=== Holkham today ===
The enormous costs of building and furnishing Holkham nearly ruined the heirs of the 1st Earl, but, as a result, they were financially constrained from altering the house to suit later fashions. Thus, Holkham, "the supreme example of the neo-Palladian house", has remained almost untouched since its completion in 1764. (Note: In the 19th century many of the windows were replaced with large sheets of plate glass. The paned windows were reinstated by the 7th earl in the 20th century.) The hall was given Grade I listed building status in 1951. While open to the public, (Note: The tradition of visiting dates back to the hall's construction. The Norfolk Tour, published in 1775, recorded that the house, "can be seen any day of the week except Sunday by noblemen and foreigners, but on Tuesday only by other people".) it remains the family home of the Earls of Leicester of Holkham. The size of the wider estate has reduced from 40,000 acres (16,000 hectares) in the mid-20th century, to 25,000 (10,000 hectares) in the early 21st; but it remains a working country estate with over 200 full-time staff, making it the area's largest employer. The present earl, Thomas Coke, has sought to diversify the estate's income streams and to lessen the dependence on agriculture by developing new ventures; Holkham Estates saw a turnover of £35 million in 2017. (Note: An attic sale of some 400 lots located in the cellars and attics at Holkham was consigned to auction by the earl in February 2025, with a combined sales estimate of £350,000-£400,000.) The earl has also continued the renovation of the hall, and estate buildings, begun by his father. (Note: Much of the re-gilding of the hall's interior has been undertaken by the Honourable Rupert Coke, a professional gilder and the present earl's brother.) A history of the house, written by the Holkham archivist, Christine Hiskey, and described by the earl as "arguably the most important, certainly the most authoritative, book ever written on Holkham" was published in 2016.

== See also ==
- Art collections of Holkham Hall
- Noble Households – book with inventory of Holkham Hall of 1760

== Sources ==
- Aslet, Clive (2005). Landmarks of Britain. London, UK: Hodder & Stoughton. ISBN 978-0-340-73510-7.
- Bold, John (1988). Wilton House and English Palladianism. London: HMSO. ISBN 978-0-113-00022-7. OCLC 18630863.
- Boyington, Amy (2014). "The Countess of Leicester and her contribution to Holkham Hall" (PDF). Georgian Group. XXII. Archived (PDF) from the original on 11 August 2024.
- Chisholm, Hugh, ed. (1911). "Leicester, Thomas William Coke, Earl of" . Encyclopædia Britannica. Vol. 16 (11th ed.). Cambridge University Press. pp. 392–393.
- Clarke, Benjamin (1852). The British Gazetteer, Political, Commercial, Ecclesiastical, and Historical. Illustrated by a Full Set of Accurately Laid Down County Maps with All the Railways. H. G. Collins. OCLC 4307330.
- Colvin, Howard (1978). A Biographical Dictionary of British Architects 1600–1840 (3rd ed.). London: John Murray. ISBN 978-0-719-53328-0. OCLC 3926533.
- Cornforth, John (1996). "The Genesis and Creation of a Great Interior". In Andrew Moore (ed.). Houghton Hall: The Prime Minister, The Empress and the Heritage. London: Philip Wilson. ISBN 978-0-856-67438-9. OCLC 36167076.
- Curl, James Stevens (2016). Oxford Dictionary of Architecture (3rd ed.). Oxford: Oxford University Press. ISBN 978-0-199-67499-2. OCLC 942359044.
- Dickinson, Harry T. (2002). A Companion to Eighteenth-Century Britain. Oxford: Blackwell's. ISBN 978-0-631-21837-1. OCLC 49276245.
- Downs, Joseph (1925). "The Tower Hill Room". Bulletin of the Pennsylvania Museum. 21 (96): 4–11. doi:10.2307/3793826. JSTOR 3793826.
- Dutton, Ralph (1948). The English Interior. London: B. T. Batsford. OCLC 171069.
- — (1949). The English County House (3rd ed.). London: B. T. Batsford. OCLC 4726628.
- Girouard, Mark (1976). "Living with the past: Victorian alterations to the country house". In Jane Fawcett (ed.). The Future of the Past: Attitudes to Conservation 1174–1974. London: Thames & Hudson. ISBN 978-0-500-23231-6. OCLC 2339749.
- — (1980). Life In The English Country House. Harmondsworth: Penguin Books. ISBN 978-0-140-05406-4. OCLC 16483924.
- Guinness, Desmond; Sadler, Julius Trousdale (1976). The Palladian Style in England, Ireland and America. London: Thames and Hudson. ISBN 978-0-500-34067-7. OCLC 2575136.
- Harris, John (1995). The Palladian Revival: Lord Burlington, His Villa and Garden at Chiswick. New Haven and London: Yale University Press. ISBN 978-0-300-05983-0. OCLC 29702279.
- Hassall, W. O. (1978). "Ilexes at Holkham". Garden History. 6 (1): 58–60. doi:10.2307/1586556. JSTOR 1586556.
- Hiskey, Christine (1997). "The Building of Holkham Hall: Newly Discovered Letters" (PDF). Architectural History. 40: 144–158. doi:10.2307/1568671. JSTOR 1568671.
- — (2016). Holkham: The Social, Architectural and Landscape History of a Great English Country House. Norwich: Unicorn Press. ISBN 978-1-910-06598-3.
- Jackson-Stops, Gervase; Pipkin, James (1985). The Country House: A Grand Tour. London: Weidenfeld & Nicolson. ISBN 978-0-297-78680-1. OCLC 12940226.
- Jenkins, Simon (2003). England's Thousand Best Houses. London: Penguin Books. ISBN 978-0-713-99596-1. OCLC 52829818.
- Jones, Nigel R. (2005). Architecture of England, Scotland and Wales. Westport, Connecticut: Greenwood Press. ISBN 978-0-313-31850-4. OCLC 728067504.
- Lees-Milne, James (1953). The Age of Inigo Jones. London: B. T. Batsford. OCLC 1454971.
- — (1983). Caves of Ice: Diaries 1946–1947. London: Chatto & Windus. ISBN 978-0-701-12657-5. OCLC 1154224958.
- — (1986) [1962]. The Earls of Creation. London: Century Hutchinson. ISBN 978-0-712-69464-3. OCLC 13994328.
- Martins, Susanna Wade (1980). A Great Estate At Work: The Holkham Estate and its Inhabitants in the Nineteenth Century. Cambridge: Cambridge University Press. ISBN 978-0-521-08084-2.
- Montgomery-Massingberd, Hugh; Sykes, Christopher (1994). Great houses of England and Wales. London: Laurence King Publishing. ISBN 978-1-856-69053-9. OCLC 31662164.
- Moore, Andrew (2017). "Thomas Coke in Turin". In Karin Wolfe; Paola Bianchi (eds.). Turin and the British in the Age of the Grand Tour. Cambridge: Cambridge University Press. ISBN 978-1-107-14770-6.
- Mowl, Timothy; Earnshaw, Brian (1985). Trumpet at a Distant Gate: The Lodge as Prelude to the Country House. London: Waterstone. ISBN 978-0-947-75205-7. OCLC 12530444.
- Mowl, Timothy (2006). William Kent: Architect, Designer, Opportunist. London: Jonathan Cape. ISBN 978-0-224-07350-9. OCLC 851822861.
- Musson, Jeremy (2013). "William Kent: Designing Georgian Britain: Review". The British Art Journal. 14 (3): 119–121. JSTOR 43492076.
- Nicolson, Nigel (1965). Great Houses of Britain. London: Hamlyn. OCLC 23660488.
- Norwich, John Julius (1985). The Architecture of Southern England. London: Macmillan Publishers. ISBN 978-0-333-22037-5. OCLC 13792627.
- Pevsner, Nikolas; Wilson, Bill (2002). Norfolk 2: North-West and South. The Buildings of England. New Haven and London: Yale University Press. ISBN 978-0-300-09657-6. OCLC 1023242874.
- Prior, Nick (2002). Museums and Modernity: Art Galleries and the Making of Modern Culture. New York and Oxford: Berg Publishers. ISBN 978-1-859-73503-9. OCLC 49225357.
- Purcell, Mark (2019). The Country House Library. New Haven and London: Yale University Press. ISBN 978-0-300-24868-5. OCLC 1090442746.
- Reist, Inge Jackson; Baker, Malcolm (2021). Sculpture Collections in Europe and the United States 1500–1930: Variety and Ambiguity. Leiden, Netherlands: Brill Publishers. ISBN 978-9-004-45884-0.
- Salmon, Frank (2013). "'Our Great Master Kent' and the Design of Holkham Hall: A Reassessment". Architectural History. 56: 63–96. doi:10.1017/S0066622X00002458. JSTOR 43489731.
- — (2015). "Thomas Coke and Holkham from 1718 to 1734: the early history" (PDF). Georgian Group. XXIII: 29–46. Archived (PDF) from the original on 10 August 2024.
- — (2018). "The peer's "smooth piers": William Kent and Thomas Coke at work designing Holkham Hall in 1733–34" (PDF). Georgian Group. XXVI: 41–56. Archived (PDF) from the original on 10 August 2024.
- Schmidt, Leo (2015). "Holkham Hall: An Architectural 'Whodunnit'". Architectural History. 58: 83–108. doi:10.1017/S0066622X00002598. JSTOR 26406254.
- Sicca, Cinzia Maria (1986). "On William Kent's Roman Sources". Architectural History. 29: 134–157. doi:10.2307/1568504. JSTOR 1568504.
- Sitwell, Sacheverell (1945). British Architects and Craftsmen. London: B. T. Batsford. OCLC 2835467.
- Summerson, John (1955). Architecture in Britain 1530–1830. Pelican History of Art. Harmondsworth: Penguin Books. OCLC 928208399.
- — (1959). "The Classical Country House in 18th-century England". Journal of the Royal Society of Arts. 107 (5036): 539–587. JSTOR 41368764.
- — (1980) [1963]. The Classical Language of Architecture. World of Art. London: Thames & Hudson.
- Tavernor, Robert (1991). Palladio and Palladianism. World of Art. London: Thames and Hudson. ISBN 978-0-500-20242-5.
- Turner, Jane (1996). The Dictionary of Art. New York: Grove Publications. ISBN 978-1-884-44600-9. OCLC 43882128.
- Wade Martins, Susanna (2009). Coke of Norfolk: 1754–1842. Woodbridge: The Boydell Press. ISBN 978-1-843-83531-8.
- Watkin, David (2005). A History of Western Architecture (4th ed.). London: Laurence King Publishing. ISBN 978-1-856-69459-9. OCLC 60668531.
- Wilson, Michael I (1984). William Kent: Architect, Designer, Painter, Gardener, 1685–1748. Abingdon-on-Thames: Routledge & Kegan Paul. ISBN 978-0-710-09983-9. OCLC 10208150.
- Wilson, Richard; Mackley, Alan (1999). "How Much did the English Country House Cost to Build, 1660–1880?". The Economic History Review. 52 (3): 436–468. doi:10.1111/1468-0289.00132. JSTOR 2599140.
- —; — (2000). Creating Paradise: The Building of the English Country House 1660–1880. London and New York: Hambledon and London. ISBN 978-1-852-85252-8. OCLC 70672627.
- Wittkower, Rudolf (1974). Palladio and English Palladianism. London: Thames and Hudson. OCLC 462688249.
- Worsley, Giles (2007). Inigo Jones and the European Classical Tradition. New Haven and London: Yale University Press. ISBN 978-0-300-11729-5. OCLC 61821817.
