= Matthew Brettingham =

English architect (1699–1769)

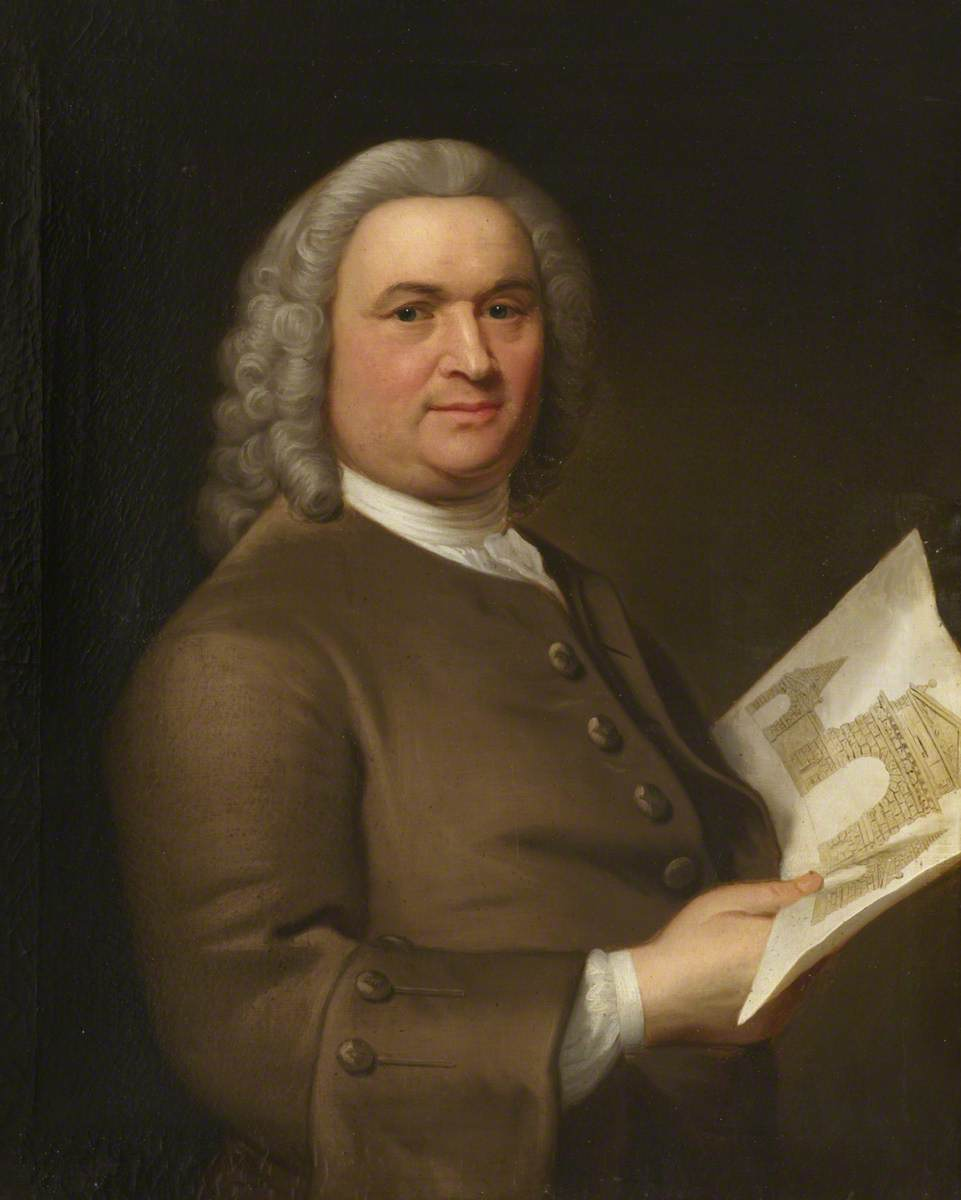
- 1749 portrait
- Born: 1699; Norwich, England
- Died: 19 August 1769 (aged 69–70); Norwich, England
- Occupation: Architect
- Buildings: Holkham Hall; Kedleston Hall; Norfolk House; Cumberland House

Matthew Brettingham (1699 – 19 August 1769), sometimes called Matthew Brettingham the Elder, was an English architect who supervised the construction of Holkham Hall, and became one of the best-known architects of his generation, despite coming from modest origins. Much of his principal work has since been demolished, particularly his work in London, where he revolutionised the design of the grand townhouse. As a result, he is often overlooked today, remembered principally for his Palladian remodelling of numerous country houses, many of them situated in the East Anglia area of Britain. As Brettingham neared the pinnacle of his career, Palladianism began to fall out of fashion and neoclassicism was introduced, championed by the young Robert Adam.

Born in Norwich, into a family of craftsmen, Brettingham worked initially as a surveyor, gaining experience through jobs for the city's civic authorities. Work included restorations at Norwich Cathedral, at the castle, at the local prison and the shire hall. His professional ascent began in 1743 with his appointment to the post of Clerk of Works at Holkham. The succeeding decades saw many aristocratic commissions, predominantly in East Anglia, but including work at Kedleston Hall in Derbyshire.

In addition to designing their country houses, Brettingham developed a substantial practice in the construction of town houses for the aristocracy. Major commissions included Norfolk House and Cumberland House, both demolished. Drawing inspiration from Italian urban palazzi, and from Andrea Palladio's rural villas, he created a style and arrangements of rooms perfectly suited to the lavish entertaining undertaken by the mid-18th-century nobility. Here, as in the country, he was ultimately superseded, and his reputation eclipsed, by the rise and success of Robert Adam. Brettingham died in 1769. His son, Matthew Brettingham the Younger, also pursued an architectural career.

== Early life ==
Brettingham was born in 1699, the second son of Launcelot Brettingham, a bricklayer or stonemason from Norwich, the county town of Norfolk, England. The younger Brettingham married Martha Bunn at St Augustine's Church, Norwich, on 17 May 1721 and they had nine children together. His early life is little documented, and one of the earliest recorded references to him is in 1719, when he and his elder brother Robert were admitted to the city of Norwich as freemen bricklayers. A critic of Brettingham's at this time claimed that his work was so poor that it was not worth the nine shillings a week (£88 in 2025) he was paid as a craftsman bricklayer. Whatever the quality of his bricklaying, he soon advanced himself and became a building contractor.

== Local contractor ==
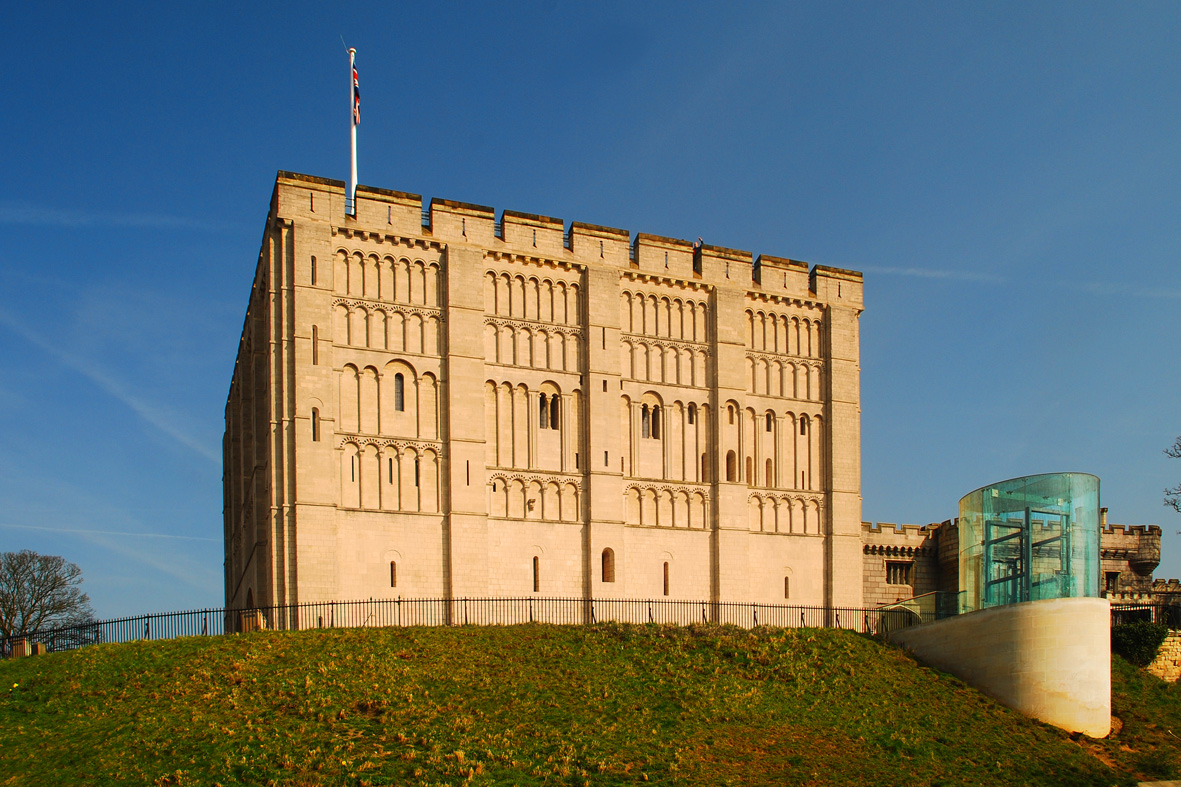
Brettingham repaired Norwich Castle in Norfolk

During the early eighteenth century, a building contractor had far more responsibilities than the title suggests today. A contractor often designed, built, and oversaw all the details of a building's construction to completion. Architects, often called surveyors, were employed only for the grandest and largest of buildings. By 1730, Brettingham is referred to as a surveyor, working on more important structures than cottages and agricultural buildings. In 1731, it is recorded that he was paid £112 (£22,500 in 2025) for his work on Norwich Gaol. From then, he appears to have worked regularly as the surveyor to the Justices (the contemporary local authority) on public buildings and bridges throughout the 1740s. Projects dating from this time include the remodelling of the Shirehouse in Norwich, the construction of Lenwade Bridge over the river Wensum in 1741, repairs to the façade of Norwich Cathedral in the 1740s, and to Norwich Castle between 1747 and 1749, as well as the rebuilding of much of St Margaret's Church, King's Lynn, which had been severely damaged by the collapse of its spire in 1742. His work on the Shirehouse, which was in the gothic style and showed a versatility of design rare for Brettingham, was to result in a protracted court case that was to rumble on through a large part of his life, with allegations of financial discrepancies. In 1755, the case was eventually closed. Brettingham was left several hundred pounds out of pocket—several tens of thousands, in present-day terms—and with a stain—if only a local one—on his character. Transcripts of the case suggest that it was Brettingham's brother Robert, to whom he had subcontracted and who was responsible for the flint stonework of the Shirehouse, who may have been the cause of the allegations. Brettingham's brief flirtation with the Gothic style, in the words of Robin Lucas, indicates "the approach of an engineer rather than an antiquary" and is "now seen as outlandish". The Shirehouse was demolished in 1822.

== Architect ==
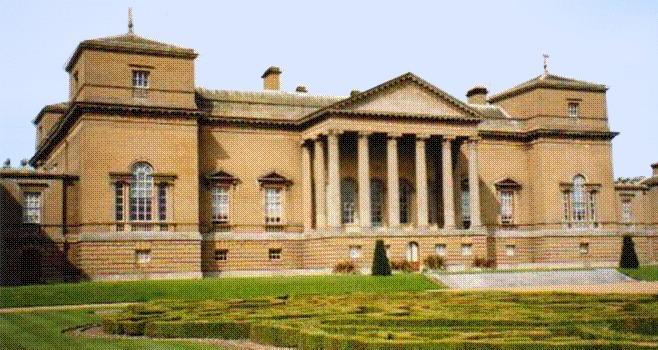
Holkham Hall in Norfolk. Matthew Brettingham's first notable employment was here as Clerk of the Works and executive architect in 1734.

In 1734, Brettingham had his first great opportunity when two of the foremost Palladian architects of the day, William Kent and Lord Burlington, were collaboratively designing a grandiose Palladian country palace, Holkham Hall, at Holkham in Norfolk for Thomas Coke, 1st Earl of Leicester. Brettingham was appointed Clerk of Works (sometimes referred to as executive architect), at an annual salary of £50 (£9,800 per year in 2025). He retained the position until the Earl died in 1759. The illustrious architects were mostly absent; indeed, Burlington was more of an idealist than an architect, thus Brettingham and the patron Lord Leicester were left to work on the project together, with the practical Brettingham interpreting the architects' plans to Leicester's requirements. It was at Holkham that Brettingham first worked with the fashionable Palladian style, which was to be his trademark. Holkham was to be Brettingham's springboard to fame, as it was through his association with it that he came to the attention of other local patrons, and further work at Heydon Hall and Honingham Hall established Brettingham as a local country-house architect.

Brettingham was commissioned in 1742 to redesign Langley Hall, a mansion standing in its own parkland in South Norfolk. His design was very much in the Palladian style of Holkham, though much smaller: a large principal central block linked to two flanking secondary wings by short corridors. The corner towers, while similar to those later designed by Brettingham at Euston Hall, were the work of a later owner and architect. The neoclassical entrance lodges were a later addition, by Sir John Soane. In 1743, Brettingham began work on the construction of Hanworth Hall, Norfolk, also in the Palladian style, with a nine-bay façade of brick with the centre three bays projected with a pediment.

In 1745, Brettingham designed Gunton Hall in Norfolk for Sir William Harbord, three years after the former house on the site was gutted by fire. The new house of brick had a principal façade like that of Hanworth Hall, however, this larger house was seven bays deep, and had a large service wing on its western side. His commissions began to come from further afield: Goodwood in Sussex and Marble Hill, Twickenham.

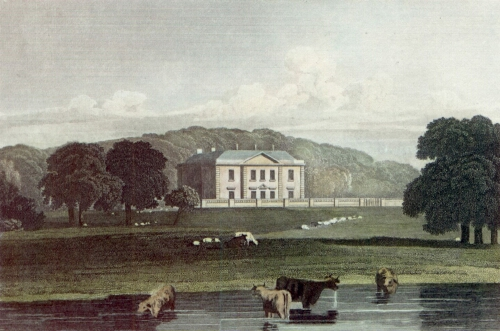
Gunton Hall, designed by Matthew Brettingham

In 1750, now well-known, the architect received an important commission to remodel Euston Hall in East Anglia, the Suffolk country seat of the influential 2nd Duke of Grafton. The original house, built circa 1666 in the French style, was built around a central court with large pavilions at each corner. While keeping the original layout, Brettingham formalised the fenestration and imposed a more classically severe order whereby the pavilions were transformed to towers in the Palladian fashion (similar to those of Inigo Jones's at Wilton House). The pavilions' domes were replaced by low pyramid roofs similar to those at Holkham. Brettingham also created the large service courtyard at Euston that now acts as the entrance court to the mansion, which today is only a fraction of its former size.

The Euston commission seems to have brought Brettingham firmly to the notice of other wealthy patrons. In 1751, he began work for Charles Wyndham, 2nd Earl of Egremont at Petworth House, Sussex. He continued work intermittently at Petworth for the next twelve years, including designing a new picture gallery from 1754, and a pair of lodges, originally called Gog and Magog but renamed the Gohanna lodges in honour of Lord Egremont's prize-winning racehorse, in 1756–1763. Over the same period his country-house work included alterations at Moor Park, Hertfordshire; Wortley Hall, Yorkshire; Wakefield Lodge, Northamptonshire; (Note: Wakefield Lodge, a hunting lodge for the Dukes of Grafton, is generally attributed to William Kent. However, as at Holkham, exact attribution is uncertain. In a paper for The Georgian Group published in 1993, Richard Hewlings suggests Brettingham may have had considerable input, perhaps executing Kent's initial designs.) and Benacre House, Suffolk.

== London townhouses ==
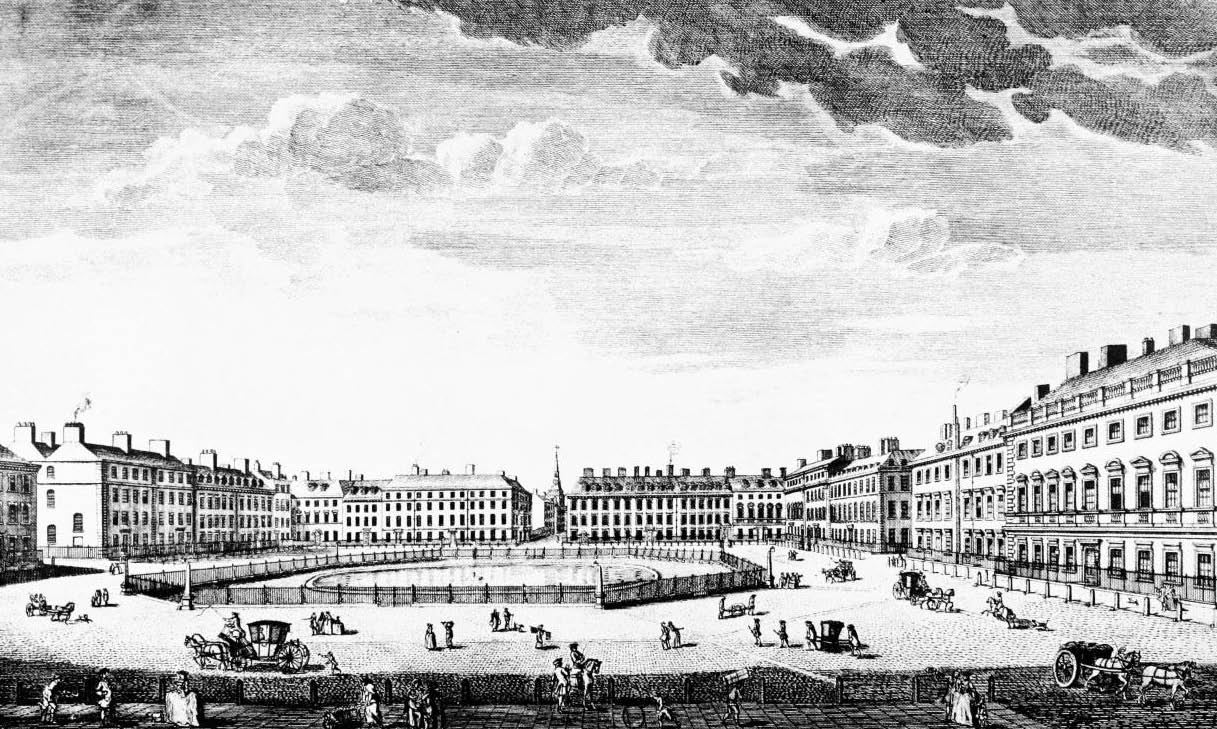
St James's Square in the 1750s: Brettingham designed Norfolk House on the far right

From 1747, Brettingham operated from London as well as Norwich. This period marks a turning point in his career, as he was now no longer designing country houses and farm buildings just for the local aristocrats and the Norfolk gentry, but for the greater aristocracy based in London.

One of Brettingham's greatest solo commissions came when he was asked to design a town house for Edward Howard, 9th Duke of Norfolk in St James's Square, London. Completed in 1756, the exterior of this mansion was similar to those of many of the great palazzi in Italian cities: bland and featureless, the piano nobile distinguishable only by its tall pedimented windows. This arrangement, devoid of pilasters and a pediment giving prominence to the central bays at roof height, was initially too severe for the English taste, even by the fashionable Palladian standards of the day. Early critics declared the design "insipid". There were, however, exceptions to this view; after attending the opening party in 1756, Horace Walpole described the house as "a scene of magnificence and taste".

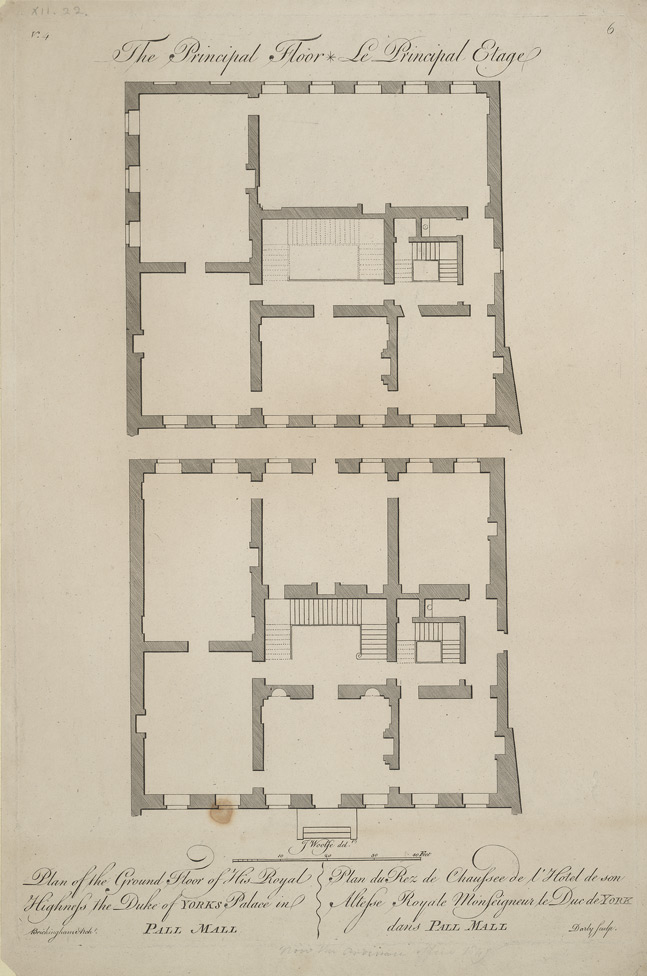
Plan of the ground and first floors of York House. Illustrating a circuit of rooms rather than an enfilade

But it was the design of the interior of Norfolk House that was particularly influential, coming to define the layout and ground plan of the London town house for the next century. The floor plan was based on an adaptation of one of the secondary wings he had built at Holkham Hall. A circuit of reception rooms centred on a grand staircase, with the staircase hall replacing the Italian traditional inner courtyard or two-storey hall. This arrangement of salons allowed the circulation of guests at large parties; having been received at the head of the staircase they were able to move through the reception rooms without having to double back on later-arriving guests. The second advantage was that while each room had access to the next, it also had access to the central stairs, thus allowing only one or two rooms to be used at a time for smaller functions. Previously, guests in London houses could only reach the principal salon by progressing through a long enfilade of minor reception rooms. In this square and compact way, Brettingham came close to recreating the layout of an original Palladian villa. He transformed what Andrea Palladio had conceived as a country retreat into a London mansion appropriate for the lifestyle of the British aristocracy, with its reversal of the usual Italian domestic pattern of a large palazzo in town, and a smaller villa in the country. As happened so often in Brettingham's career, Robert Adam later developed this design concept further, and was credited with its success. However, Brettingham's plan for Norfolk House was to serve as the prototype for many London mansions over the next few decades.

Brettingham's additional work in London included two more houses in St James's Square: No. 5 for the 2nd Earl of Strafford and No. 13 for Henry Liddell, 1st Baron Ravensworth. Lord Egremont, for whom Brettingham was working in the country at Petworth, gave Brettingham another opportunity to design a grandiose London mansion—the Egremont family's town house. Begun in 1759, this Palladian palace, known at the time as Egremont House, or more modestly as 94 Piccadilly, is one of the few great London town houses still standing. It later came to be known as Cambridge House and was the home of Lord Palmerston, and then of the Naval & Military Club. The club sold the house at the end of the 20th century, and planning permissions for conversion, firstly to a single private house and subsequently to a hotel and apartments, were approved in 2007, 2013 and 2017. As at 2021, the plans remained uncompleted.

== Kedleston Hall ==
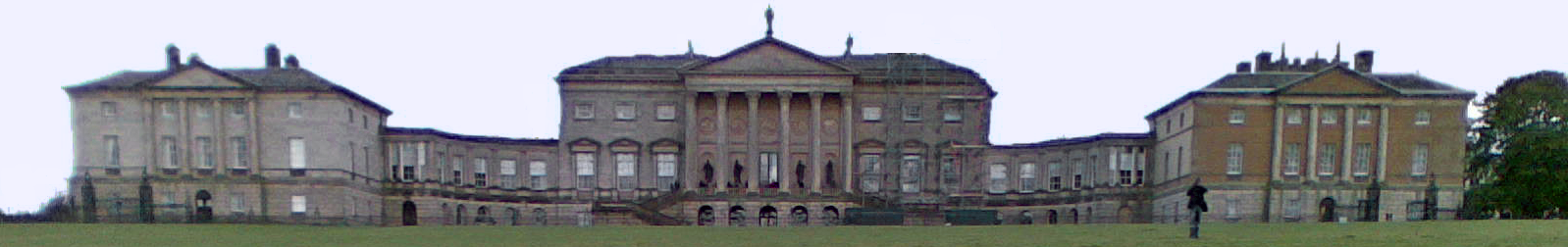
The North Front of Kedleston Hall in Derbyshire "has been described as 'the grandest Palladian façade in Britain, and with few rivals anywhere in the world'".

In 1759 Sir Nathaniel Curzon, later 1st Baron Scarsdale, commissioned Brettingham to design a great country house on his Derbyshire estate. Thirty years before a prospective design for a new Kedleston Hall had been drawn up by James Gibbs, one of the leading architects of the day, but Curzon wanted his new house to match the style and taste of Holkham. Lord Leicester, Holkham's owner and Brettingham's employer, was a particular hero of Curzon's. Curzon was a Tory from a very old Derbyshire family, and he wished to create a showpiece to rival the nearby Chatsworth House owned by the Whig Duke of Devonshire, whose family were relative newcomers in the county, having arrived little more than two hundred years earlier. However, the Duke of Devonshire's influence, wealth, and title were far superior to Curzon's, and Curzon was unable either to complete his house or to outdo the Devonshires (William Cavendish, 4th Duke of Devonshire, had been prime minister in the 1750s). This commission might have been the ultimate accolade Brettingham was seeking, to recreate Holkham but this time with full credit. Kedleston Hall was designed by Brettingham on a plan by Palladio for the unbuilt Villa Mocenigo. The design by Brettingham, similar to that of Holkham Hall, was for a massive principal central block flanked by four secondary wings, each a miniature country house, themselves linked by quadrant corridors. From the outset of the project, Curzon seems to have presented Brettingham with rivals. In 1759, while Brettingham was still supervising the construction of the initial phase, the northeast family block, Curzon employed architect James Paine, the most notable architect of the day, to supervise the kitchen block and quadrants. Paine also went on to supervise the construction of Brettingham's great north front. However, this was a critical moment for architecture in England. Palladianism was being challenged by a new taste for neoclassical designs, one exponent of which was Robert Adam. Curzon had met Adam as early as 1758, and had been impressed by the young architect newly returned from Rome. He employed Adam to design some garden pavilions for the new Kedleston. So impressed was Curzon by Adam's work that by April 1760 he had put Adam in sole charge of the design of the new mansion, replacing both Brettingham and Paine. Adam completed the north façade of the mansion much as Brettingham had designed it, only altering Brettingham's intended portico. (Note: The architectural critic, Benjamin Forgey, in a review of the Kedleston exhibition at the Octagon Museum in Washington, D.C., in 1987, drew a contrast between the Brettingham/Paine north front, and Adam's south façade; "the north front, its pedimented centerpiece and symmetrical wings designed mainly by Brettingham and/or Paine (but with a few telling alterations by Adam), is an impressive neoclassical exercise, strong, simple, clear. The south front, designed by Adam in 1760, is a vastly more muscular, more original undertaking, with projecting domed rotunda, sweeping double staircase and powerful Corinthian columns combined with elegant surface decorations".) The basic layout of the house remained loyal to Brettingham's original plan, although only two of the proposed four secondary wings were executed.

Brettingham moved on to other projects. In the 1760s, he was approached by his most illustrious patron, Prince Edward, Duke of York and Albany (brother of King George III), to design one of the greatest mansions in Pall Mall, York House. The rectangular mansion that Brettingham designed was built in the Palladian style on two principal floors, with the state rooms as at Norfolk House, arranged in a circuit around the central staircase hall. The house was a mere pastiche of Norfolk House, but for Brettingham it had the kudos of a royal occupant.

== Legacy ==
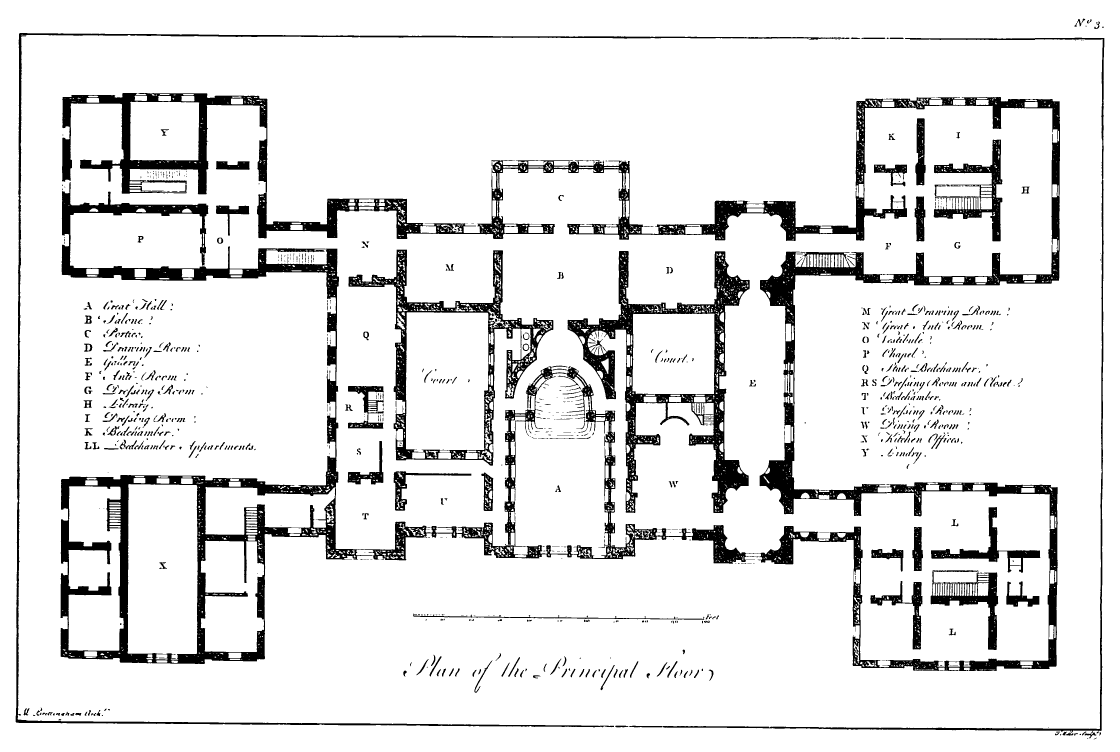
In 1761, Brettingham published the plans of Holkham Hall, signing each plate in the lower left corner "Matthew Brettingham, Architect".

Its royal occupant may very well have made York House the pinnacle of Brettingham's career. Built during the 1760s, it was one of his last grand houses. His last country-house commission was at Packington Hall, Warwickshire. In 1761, he published his plans of Holkham Hall, calling himself the architect, which led critics, including Horace Walpole, to decry him as a purloiner of Kent's designs. (Note: A portrait of Brettingham by John Theodore Heins Senior, showing him holding a drawing of the Triumphal Arch at Holkham, is held in the library of the Royal Institute of British Architects.) Brettingham died on 19 August 1769 at his house outside St Augustine's Gate, Norwich, and was buried in the aisle of the parish church. Throughout his long career, Brettingham did much to popularise the Palladian movement. His clients included a royal duke and at least twenty-one assorted peers and peeresses. He is not a household name today largely because his provincial work was heavily influenced by Kent and Burlington, and unlike his contemporary Giacomo Leoni he did not develop, or was not given the opportunity to develop, a strong personal stamp to his work on country houses. Ultimately, he and many of his contemporary architects were eclipsed by the designs of Robert Adam. Adam remodelled Brettingham's York House in 1780 and, having supplanted both Brettingham and James Paine at Kedleston, went on to replace Paine as architect at Nostell Priory, Alnwick Castle, and Syon House.

Brettingham's principal contribution to architectural change was perhaps the design of the grand London town house; often with unremarkable exteriors, Brettingham replaced the traditional long Baroque enfilades with a circulating plan of reception rooms suitable for lavish and large scale entertaining. Many of these anachronistic palaces are now long demolished; York House was torn down between 1908 and 1912, and Norfolk House in 1938; (Note: The panelling from the music room at Norfolk House, decorated by Giovanni Battista Borra, survives in the collection of the Victoria and Albert Museum.) or have been transformed for other uses and are inaccessible for public viewing. Hence, what little remains in London of his work is generally unknown. Outside of London, of Brettingham's work, only the buildings he re-modelled have survived, and for this reason Brettingham tends to be thought of as an "improver" rather than an architect of country houses. His entry in the Art UK directory describes him as "never more than an orthodox and unenterprising Palladian." George Wardlaw Burnet's entry in the 1885 Dictionary of National Biography concluded, "Exhibiting no great novelty of conception, it must be admitted he displayed knowledge and skill equal to those of any architect of his time".

There is no evidence that Brettingham ever formally studied architecture or travelled abroad. Reports of him making two trips to Continental Europe, are the result of confusion with his son, Matthew Brettingham the Younger. That he enjoyed success in his own lifetime is beyond doubt—Robert Adam calculated that when Brettingham sent his son on the Grand Tour (1747), he went with a sum of money in his pocket of around £15,000 (£2.93 million in 2025), an enormous amount at the time. However, part of this sum was probably used to acquire the statuary in Italy (documented as supplied by Matthew Brettingham the Younger) for the nearly completed Holkham Hall. Matthew Brettingham the Younger wrote that his father "considered the building of Holkham as the great work of his life", and it is perhaps the building for which he is best remembered although the exact nature and extent of his contribution continues to be a matter of scholarly debate.

== Sources ==
- Burnet, G. W. (1886). "Brettingham, Matthew". In Stephen, Leslie (ed.). Dictionary of National Biography. Vol. 6. London: Smith, Elder & Co. pp. 287–288.
- Colvin, Howard (1995). A Biographical Dictionary of British Architects 1600–1840 (3 ed.). New Haven, US and London: Yale University Press. ISBN 0-300-06091-2.
- Girouard, Mark (1978). Life in the English Country House. New Haven, US and London: Yale University Press. ISBN 0-300-02273-5.
- Harling, Robert (1969). Historic Houses. Conde Nast Publications.
- Hewlings, Richard (1993). "Wakefield Lodge and Other Houses of the Second Duke of Grafton" (PDF). The Georgian Group. 3: 43–61.
- Howell, James D. E. (1964). "Matthew Brettingham and the County of Norfolk". Norfolk Archaeology. 33, Part III (3). doi:10.5284/1077966.
- Jackson-Stops, Gervase (1990). The Country House in Perspective. Pavilion Books. ISBN 1-85145-383-0.
- Nicolson, Nigel (1965). Great Houses of Britain. London: George Weidenfeld & Nicolson Ltd. ISBN 0-600-01651-X.
- National Trust, ed. (1998). Kedleston Hall. Derbyshire Countryside.
- Schmidt, Leo (2015). "Holkham Hall: An Architectural 'Whodunnit'". Architectural History. 58: 83–108. doi:10.1017/S0066622X00002598. S2CID 194901745. (Subscription required)
- Sheppard, F. H. W. (1960). St. James Westminster, Part 1. Vol. 29. Survey of London.
- Wilson, Michael I. (1984). William Kent. London: Routledge & Kegan Paul. ISBN 0-7100-9983-5.
