= Peter Burman =

British architectural historian (born 1944)

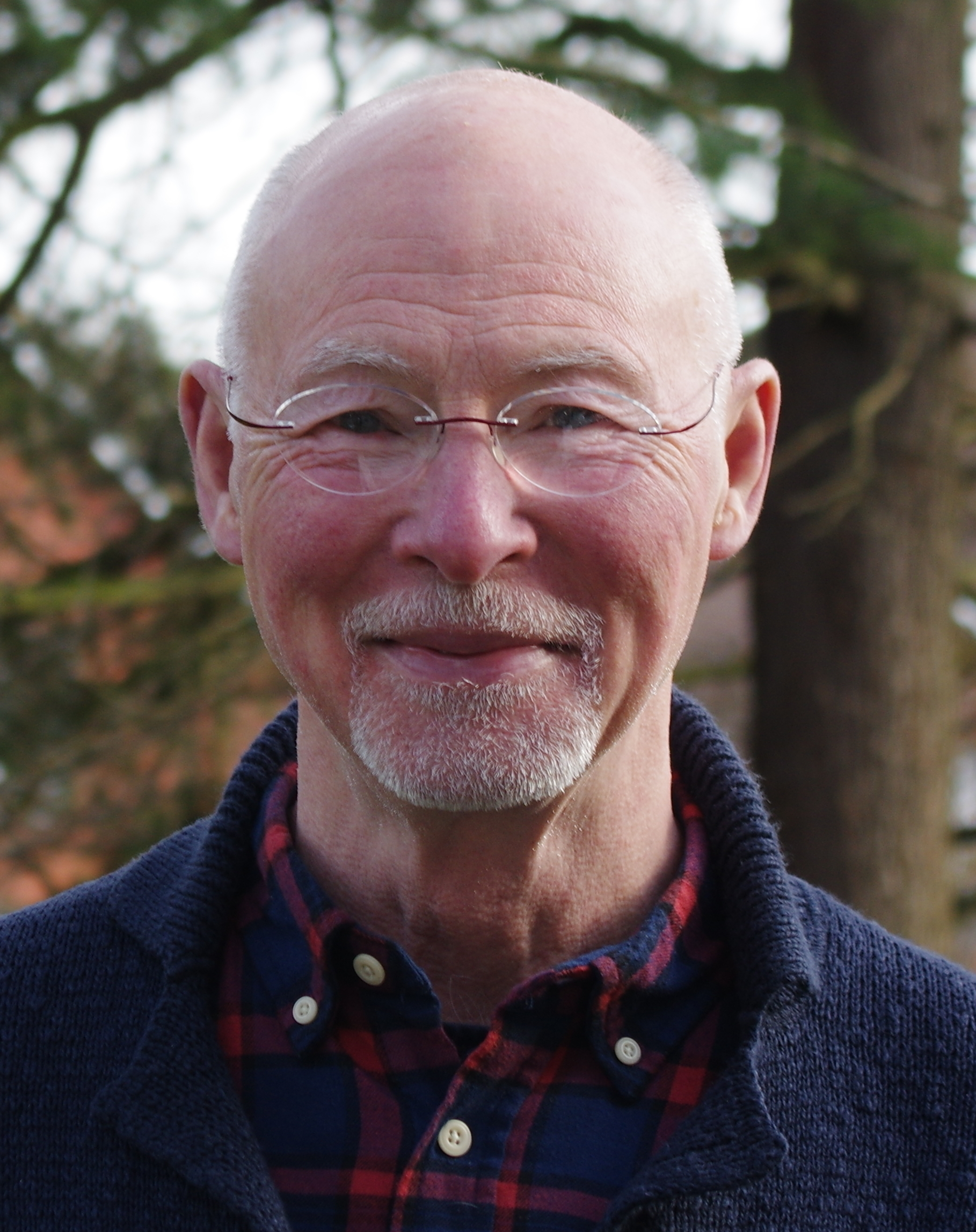
Dr Peter Burman in 2018

Peter Burman (born Peter Ashley Thomas Insull Burman, MBE FSA, Solihull, 15 September 1944) is a British architectural historian.

== Education ==
He studied History of Art at King's College, Cambridge. In 1980 he participated in the Mural Paintings Conservation Course at ICCROM (International Centre for the Study of the Preservation and Restoration of Cultural Property) in Rome.

== Career ==
From 1968 to 1990 he worked for the Council for the Care of Churches (now the Church Buildings Council) serving as its General Secretary from 1977 onwards. From 1990 to 2002 he was Director of the Centre for Conservation Studies, Department of Archaeology, University of York. From 2002 to 2007, he was Director of Conservation and Property Services at the National Trust for Scotland. From 2007 to 2012 he was Professor of Cultural Heritage Management at the Department of World Heritage Studies, Brandenburg Technical University, Cottbus. From 2012 onwards he has continued to be active as an arts and heritage consultant, for clients which have included the Duke of Buccleuch and the Chapter of Lincoln Cathedral.

== Other activities ==
He is a member of the Fabric Advisory Committee of St George's Chapel, Windsor Castle, and its Sculpture Committee. From 2013 to 2015 he was Chair of the Garden History Society for Scotland. He has a special interest in the use of building limes: he founded the Building Limes Forum for the United Kingdom in 1992, and served as its Convenor from 1992 to 2000. In February 2015 he was elected Vice-Chair of the Built Environment Forum for Scotland. He is a Guardian of the Society for the Protection of Ancient Buildings and chair of SPAB Scotland, and a founding trustee of SAVE Britain's Heritage. He is Chairman of the Falkland Stewardship Trust, Chairman of the Falkland Society, and Archivist and Trustee of Hopetoun House. In 2016 he was elected Chair of the Falkland Community Council.

He is a Companion of John Ruskin's Guild of St George, and was elected a Director of the Guild in 2018.

He is a member of the Vestry of St James, Goldenacre, and a member of the Provincial Buildings Committee of the Scottish Episcopal Church.

In October 2025 he was appointed Patron of the Medieval Kintyre Project.

In 2026 he was appointed President of the Edinburgh Society of Organists.

== Honours ==
In May 1974 he was elected a Fellow of the Society of Antiquaries of London. He received an MBE in the New Years Honours for 1990 as General Secretary of the Council for the Care of Churches. In 2003 he received an honorary doctorate of engineering (Dr.-Ing. e.h.) in monument conservation and architectural history (Denkmalpflege und Architekturgeschichte) from the Brandenburg Technical University, Cottbus. He is a member of the Art Workers' Guild.

== Personal life ==
In June 2019 he married Ross Burgess in a Humanist ceremony in Falkland, Fife, followed a week later by a ceremony at the Unitarian Church in Croydon.

== Bibliography ==
=== Books ===
- Terry Friedman and Peter Burman, James Gibbs as a Church Designer: An Exhibition Celebrating the Restoration of the Cathedral Church of All Saints at Derby, 1972, Chapterhouse Press, 1972.
- Marcus Binney and Peter Burman, Chapels & Churches: Who Cares (British Tourist Authority, 1977). Hardback, 320 pages. ISBN 0-85630-555-3.
- Marcus Binney and Peter Burman, Change and Decay: Future of Our Churches (Littlehampton Book Services Ltd, 1977). Hardback, 208 pages. ISBN 978-0289707746.
- Peter Burman, editor, Conservation of Wallpaintings: The International Scene (Council for the Care of Churches, 1986).
- Peter Burman, St Paul's Cathedral (Bell & Hyman, The New Bell's Cathedral Guides. 1987) ISBN 978-0713526165
- Peter Burman and Henry Stapleton, The Churchyards Handbook: Advice on the history and significance of churchyards, their care, improvement and maintenance (Church House Publishing for the Council for the Care of Churches. Third edition, 1988). ISBN 07151 75548.
- Peter Burman, Keith Garner and Leo Schmidt (editors), The Conservation of Twentieth Century Historic Buildings: Proceedings of a Conference at the Institute of Advanced Architectural Studies, 1993 (University of York, Inst. of Advanced Architectural Studies, 1996. ISBN 0 904761 36 3
- Peter Burman, editor, Treasures on Earth: A good housekeeping guide to churches and their contents (Donhead, 1994). Hardback, 320 pages.
- Peter Burman, editor, Economics of Architectural Conservation: Based on the Proceedings of a Consultation at King's Manor, 13–14 February 1995 (University of York, Inst. of Advanced Architectural Studies, 1995) Paperback 118 pages. ISBN 978-0904761511
- Peter Burman, editor, Architecture 1900 (Routledge 1998). Hardback 284 pages. ISBN 978-1873394328.
- Peter Burman, Conserving the Railway Heritage (Taylor & Francis, 1996), paperback, 244 pages. ISBN 978-0419212805.
- Leo Schmidt, Peter Burman, Christian Keller: Looking Forwards: The Country House in Contemporary Research and Conservation,: Proceedings of the Conference in York in 1999. Cottbus 2001.
- Peter Burman and Enrico Fodde, editors, This Common Bond: Training Cathedral Craftsmen and Conservators for the Next Generation (University of York, 2001) ISBN 0 904761 69 X.
- Peter Burman, editor, Celebrating Conservation: 30 Years of Conservation Studies at the University of York (University of York, 2002) ISBN 0 904761 70 3.

=== Chapters in books ===
- Peter Burman, "Small Town Stations", in Marcus Binney & David Pearce, Railway Architecture (Orbis Publishing Limited 1979, republished Bloomsbury Books, 1985).
- Peter Burman, "Chapter 15: 'Hallowed Antiquity': Ethical Considerations in the Selection of Conservation Treatments", in N. S. Baer and R. Snethlage, The Conservation of Historic Stone Structures (John Wiley and Sons, 1997).
- Peter Burman, "Chapter 23: Decoration, Furnishings and Art since 1900". In Derek Keene, Arthur Burns and Andrew Saint, St. Paul's: The Cathedral Church of London, 604–2004 (Yale University Press. 2004) ISBN 9780300092769
- Peter Burman, "Das Schöne mit dem Nützlichen: Englische Vorbilder und Einflüsse auf die Potsdamer Parklandschaft", in Nichts gedeiht ohne Pflege: Die Potsdamer Parklandschaft und ihre Gärtner (Potsdam: Stiftung Preußischer Schlösser und Gärten Berlin-Brandenburg, 2001).
- Peter Burman, "Noble ideal or political football?: A personal view of the World Heritage Convention and aspects of its progress during the past thirty years", in Jahrbuch, Stiftung Preußischer Schlösser und Gärten Berlin-Brandenburg, Band 4: 2001/2002 (Berlin: Akademie Verlag, 2003).}.
- Peter Burman, "Introduction", in Quiet Hands: A Retrospective of Arts & Crafts Furniture Maker Nicholas Hobbs (William Morris Gallery, 2010).
- Peter Burman, "Reconstruction in Theory and Practice:Reflections from a British Perspective" in Uta Hassler and Winfried Nerdinger (editors), Das Prinzip Rekonstruktion (vdf Hochschulverlag AG an der ETH Zurich, 2010) ISBN 978-3-7281-3347-2.
- Peter Burman and Dennis Rodwell, "The Contribution of the United Kingdom to European Architectural Heritage Year 1975", in A Future for our Past: The 40th Anniversary of European Architectural Heritage Year (1975–2015) (Berlin: Hendrik Bäßler Verlag, 2015), pp 262–275).
- Peter Burman, Chapter 3 "Abercorn House and Churchyard and the Hopetoun Mausoleum", and Chapter 4 "The Useful and Beautiful on the Hopetoun Estate", in Countess of Hopetoun, Polly Feversham and Leo Schmidt (editors), Hopetoun, Scotland's Finest Stately Home (Hirmer Verlag GmbH, Munich, 2020) ISBN 978-3777434391.

=== Articles in journals and magazines ===
- Peter Burman, "Inigo Jones at Hale" [Concerning Hale Church, Hampshire], Country Life, 7 February 1974.
- Peter Burman, "The Revival of Lime for Cathedral Repairs", Lime News, Vol. 4 No. 2 (The Building Limes Forum, 1996).
- Peter Burman, "'Obstinate Sincerity': A Reading of A. R. Powys", The Powys Journal, Volume VI, 1996 ISBN 978-1874559-15-3.
- Peter Burman, "Conservation Philosophy in Practice: A Scottish Perspective" in Architectural Heritage XVII: The Journal of the Architectural Heritage Society of Scotland (Edinburgh University Press, 2006).
- Peter Burman, "Judith Scott, obituary." The Guardian, 7 July 2011.
- Peter Burman, "Prophet of Preservation" [i.e. John Ruskin] in the SPAB Magazine, Winter 2018 (Society for the Protection of Ancient Buildings).
- Peter Burman, "Robert and Eve Baker: A Tribute" in The Journal of the Building Limes Forum, Volume 25, 2018.
- Peter Burman, "Historic Organs as Mainstream Cultural Heritage" in BIOS Journal Volume 43 (British Institute of Organ Studies, 2019).
- Peter Burman, "Rory Young obituary", The Guardian, 4 April 2023.
- Peter Burman, "Save our Churches", Scottish Field, August 2025, pp 32–33.
