= Matthew Brettingham the Younger =

British architect (1724–1803)

Matthew Brettingham the Younger (bapt. 28 December 1724 – 18 March 1803) was a British architect. He was the eldest son of Matthew Brettingham the Elder and worked also in Palladian style.

He travelled to Italy in 1747, where he purchased sculptures and artwork for his British patrons, including Thomas Coke, 1st Earl of Leicester. He returned to England in 1754.

One of his patrons, Frederick North, Lord North, made him President of the Board of Green Cloth. North and Brettingham had met as young men in Rome. The value of the appointment fell after the passage of the Civil List and Secret Service Money Act 1782, and North appointed Brettingham deputy revenue collector of the Cinque Ports, an office which yielded an income of several hundred pounds a year.

His architectural practice was largely restricted to working for his father until 1769, when his father died, and after that it was limited in scope. In the words of Howard Colvin, "the income derived from his sinecures seems largely to have relieved Brettingham from the need to develop an extensive architectural practice."

One of Brettinghams' notable works is the 18th-century remodel of Kingston Lacy House, then Kingston Hall, in Dorset, England.
