= Albert Auwercx =

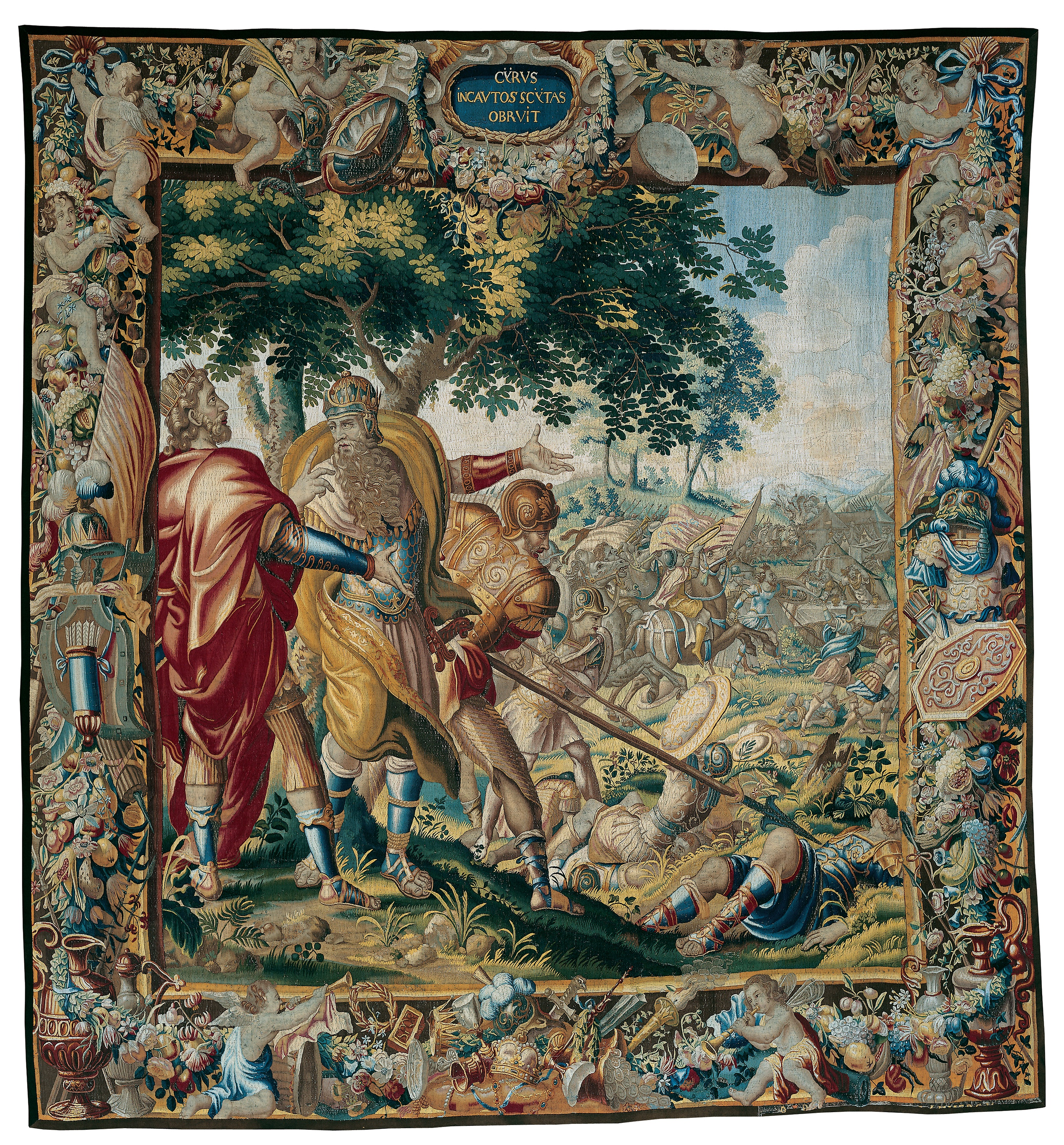
Cyrus Defeats Spargapises from The Story of Cyrus, c. 1670. Tapestry, workshop of Albert Auwercx.

Albert Auwercx (sometimes Auwerx) (c. 1629–1709) was a Brussels tapestry-maker (tapissier) who played an important part in the tapestry industry of that city. His workshop partner was his brother Nicolas.

== Early life ==
Albert Auwercx was born around 1629 to Marcus and Clara Canart. He was christened on 10 February 1629 in the Brussels Church of Our Lady of the Chapel, which was known for its connections to the tapestry industry.

== Tapestry industry ==
Auwercx opened his workshop in 1657 and was granted exemption from taxation by the city of Brussels in 1671. Through the careful marriages of his children and the choice of godparents, he formed alliances with other important tapissiers. After 1679 he served several terms as dean of the tapestry guild. In 1705, when the city of Brussels tallied all the tapestry looms in the city, the Auwercx workshop contained five looms out of a citywide total of fifty-three. The weaver's mark AVWERCX or A. AVWERC in the selvage often identifies products of his workshop.

== Death ==
Auwercx was buried in the church of Our Lady of the Chapel on 31 August 1709. His workshop continued to be maintained by his son Philippe (1663–1740).
