= Frank Salmon =

English historian (born 1962)

Frank Edwin Salmon (born 8 June 1962) is an English architectural historian based at the University of Cambridge, where he was the President of St John's College Cambridge until 2019. He is also a Fellow of the Society of Antiquaries, a Trustee of Sir John Soane's Museum and a member of Historic England's Expert Advisory Group.

== Biography and works ==
Salmon was born in Ipswich and educated at Northgate Grammar School for Boys, Downing College, Cambridge, and the Courtauld Institute of Art. He taught at the University of Manchester from 1989 to 2002 and as Adjunct Associate Professor for Yale University's Paul Mellon Centre for Studies in British Art in London from 2002 to 2006. Since then, he has taught in the Department of History of Art at Cambridge, where he succeeded David Watkin. He has been a Fellow of St John's College, Cambridge, since 2006.

He won the Hawksmoor Essay Medal of the Society of Architectural Historians of Great Britain in 1992. In 2001 his book Building on Ruins was joint winner of the Whitfield Prize of the Royal Historical Society, and it also won the 2002 Spiro Kostof Prize of the American Society of Architectural Historians. In 2006, Salmon was the invited Plenary Speaker in Savannah, Georgia, at the annual meeting of the Society.

Salmon's reassessment of William Kent's public architecture, including unbuilt designs for new Houses of Parliament of the 1730s, appeared in William Kent: Designing Georgian Britain (2013), the book that accompanied the major William Kent exhibition held at the Bard Graduate Center, New York, and the Victoria and Albert Museum, London, in 2014.

Salmon has served as Chairman of the Society of Architectural Historians of Great Britain (2003–2006) and as Chairman of the Faculty of Archaeology, History and Letters of the British School at Rome (2006–2011). The Rickman Society, a graduate architectural history discussion group named after Thomas Rickman, author of An Attempt to Discriminate the Styles of English Architecture (1817) and designer of the 'Wedding Cake' New Court and the Bridge of Sighs at St John's College, Cambridge, meets in Salmon's rooms at St John's.

He is married to art historian Catharine MacLeod, Curator of Seventeenth-Century Collections at the National Portrait Gallery, London, and has two children.

== Publications ==
- Building on Ruins: The Rediscovery of Rome and English Architecture, Ashgate, 2000
- Summerson and Hitchcock: Centenary Essays on Architectural Historiography, ed., Yale University Press, 2006
- The Persistence of the Classical: Essays on Architecture Presented to David Watkin, ed., Philip Wilson Publishers, 2008
