= Leo Schmidt =

German curator

Leo Schmidt (born Leopold Rupert Schmidt, in 1953) is a German curator of monuments and a historian of art and architecture. He is professor at the department of architectural conservation at the Brandenburg University of Technology.

== Early life and education ==
Schmidt studied art history, classical archeology and history at the University of Freiburg and at LMU Munich. In 1980, he gained his Doctor of Philosophy at the University of Freiburg with a thesis on the architecture of Holkham Hall.

== Career ==
From 1980 until 1995, Schmidt worked as a senior investigator in the State Department for the Care of Historic Buildings in Baden-Württemberg; last as the head of department of monument inventory in Baden. Since 1995, he is full professor holding the chair for architectural conservation at the Brandenburg University of Technology.

Schmidt's research interests include the theory and practice of heritage preservation and its history, the history of city development and historic town centres, and architecture and urban planning during the reign of the Wilhelmine Empire. He has studied building archeology and heritage preservation of English Country houses of the 18th century. He has compiled a history of the building of the Berlin Wall and the army research center Peenemünde. He has published a number of books and articles on this subject.

Since 2006, he is a fellow of the Society of Antiquaries of London.

== Selected publications ==
- Leo Schmidt, Peter Burman, Christian Keller: Looking Forwards: The Country House in Contemporary Research and Conservation, Proceedings of the Conference in York in 1999. Cottbus 2001
- Polly Feversham, Leo Schmidt: Die Berliner Mauer Heute - Denkmalwert und Umgang. The Berlin Wall Today - Cultural Significance and Conservation Issues, Berlin 1999; ISBN 3-345-00733-9
- Axel Klausmeier, Leo Schmidt: Wall Remnants - Wall Traces, Bad Münstereifel 2004; ISBN 3-929592-40-1
- Leo Schmidt, Henriette von Preuschen (Hrsg.): On Both Sides of the Wall. Preservation of Monuments and Sites of the Cold War Era - Auf beiden Seiten der Mauer. Denkmalpflege an Objekten des Kalten Krieges, Bad Münstereifel 2005; ISBN 3-929592-76-2
- Leo Schmidt, Christian Keller, Polly Feversham: Holkham, München-Berlin-London-New York 2005; ISBN 3-7913-3414-X
- Countess of Hopetoun, Polly Feversham and Leo Schmidt (editors), Hopetoun, Scotland's Finest Stately Home (Hirmer Verlag GmbH, Munich, 2020) ISBN 978-3777434391.
