= West Norfolk Militia =

Auxiliary unit of the British Army

1st or West Norfolk Militia 3rd Battalion, Norfolk Regiment
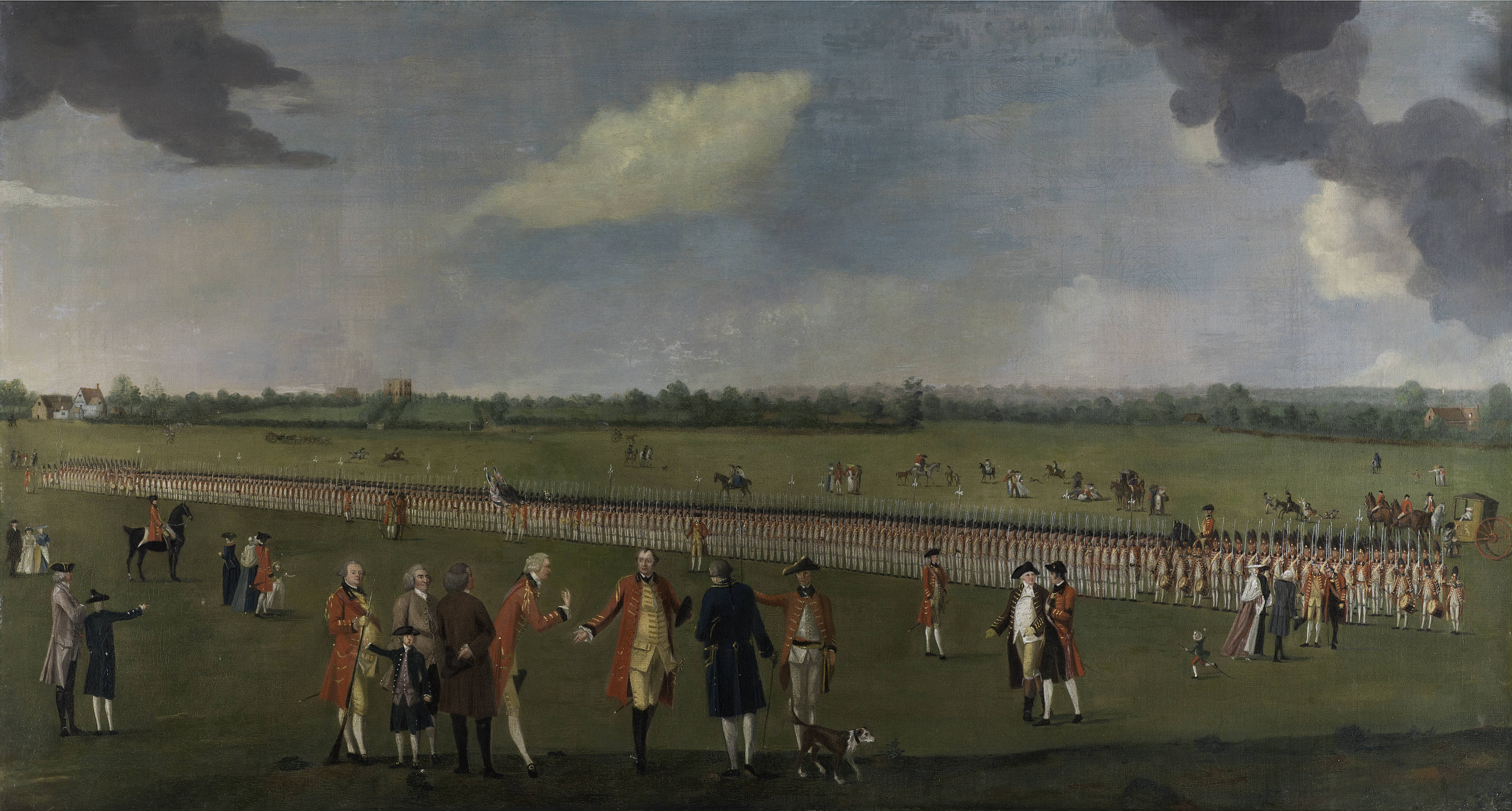
- c. 1759–1763 painting of the Norfolk Militia being reviewed
- Active: 7 October 1758–1 April 1953
- Country: Kingdom of Great Britain (1758–1800); United Kingdom (1801–1953)
- Branch: Militia/Special Reserve
- Role: Infantry
- Size: 1 Battalion
- Part of: Norfolk Regiment
- Garrison/HQ: Norwich
- Engagements: Second Boer War

Commanders
- Notable commanders: Field Marshal George Townshend, 1st Marquess Townshend; George Walpole, 3rd Earl of Orford; Horatio Walpole, 2nd Earl of Orford

The West Norfolk Militia was an auxiliary military regiment in the English county of Norfolk in East Anglia. First organised during the Seven Years' War it carried out internal security and home defence duties in all of Britain's major wars. It later became a battalion of the Norfolk Regiment, served in South Africa during the Second Boer War, and supplied thousands of recruits to the fighting battalions during World War I. After 1921 the militia had only a shadowy existence until its final abolition in 1953.

== Background ==
The universal obligation to military service in the Shire levy was long established in England and its legal basis was updated by two Acts of 1557, which placed selected men, the 'Trained Bands', under the command of Lords Lieutenant appointed by the monarch. This is seen as the starting date for the organised county militia in England. It was an important element in the country's defence at the time of the Spanish Armada in the 1580s, and control of the militia was one of the areas of dispute between King Charles I and Parliament that led to the English Civil War. Although hardly employed during the civil wars, the Norfolk Trained Bands were active in controlling the country under the Commonwealth and Protectorate. The English militia was re-established under local control in 1662 after the Restoration of the monarchy, and Norfolk supported five regiments of foot and one of horse. However, after the Peace of Utrecht in 1715 the militia was allowed to decline.

== 1757 Reforms ==
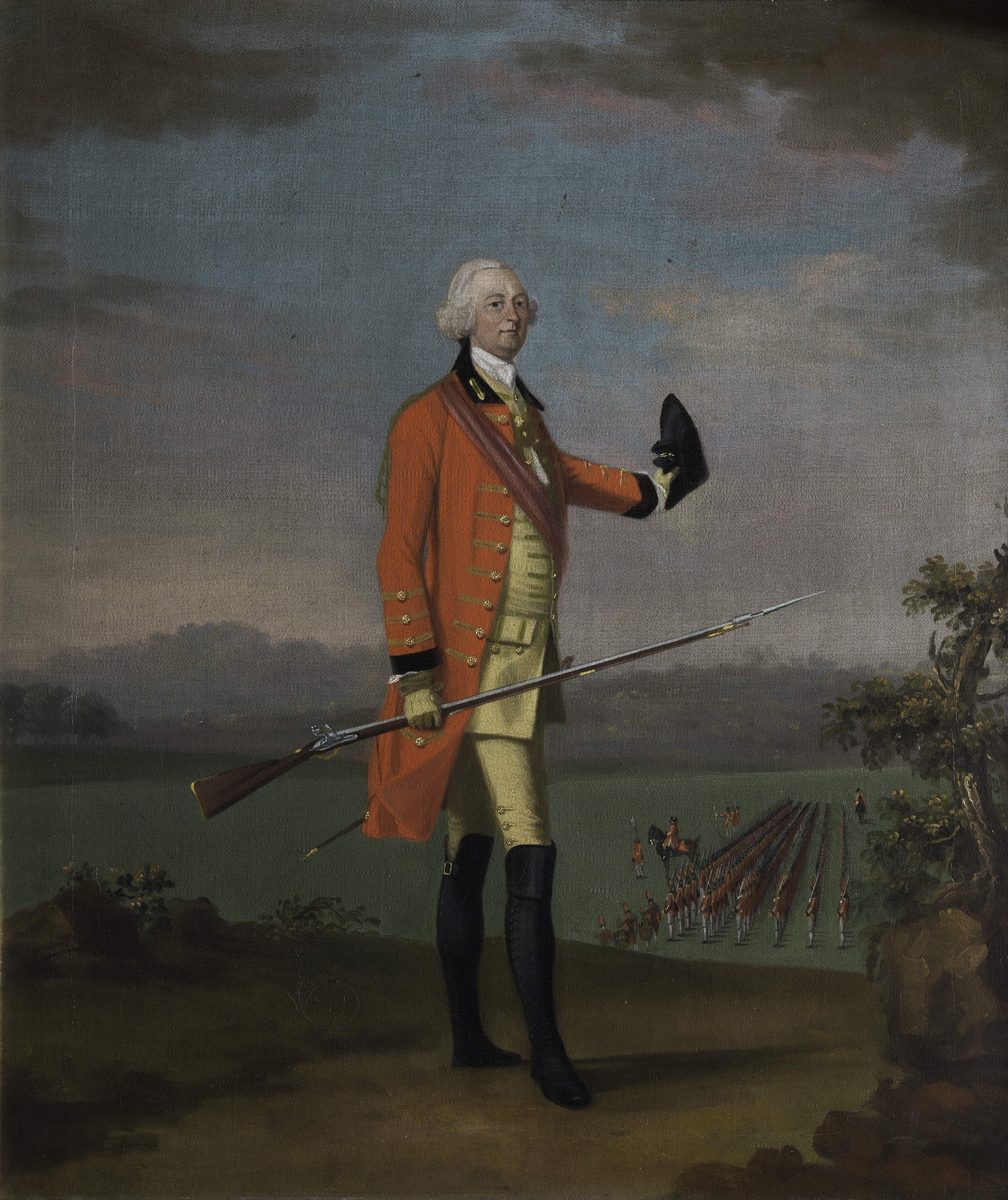
c. 1758 portrait of the Western Battalion officer Thomas de Grey

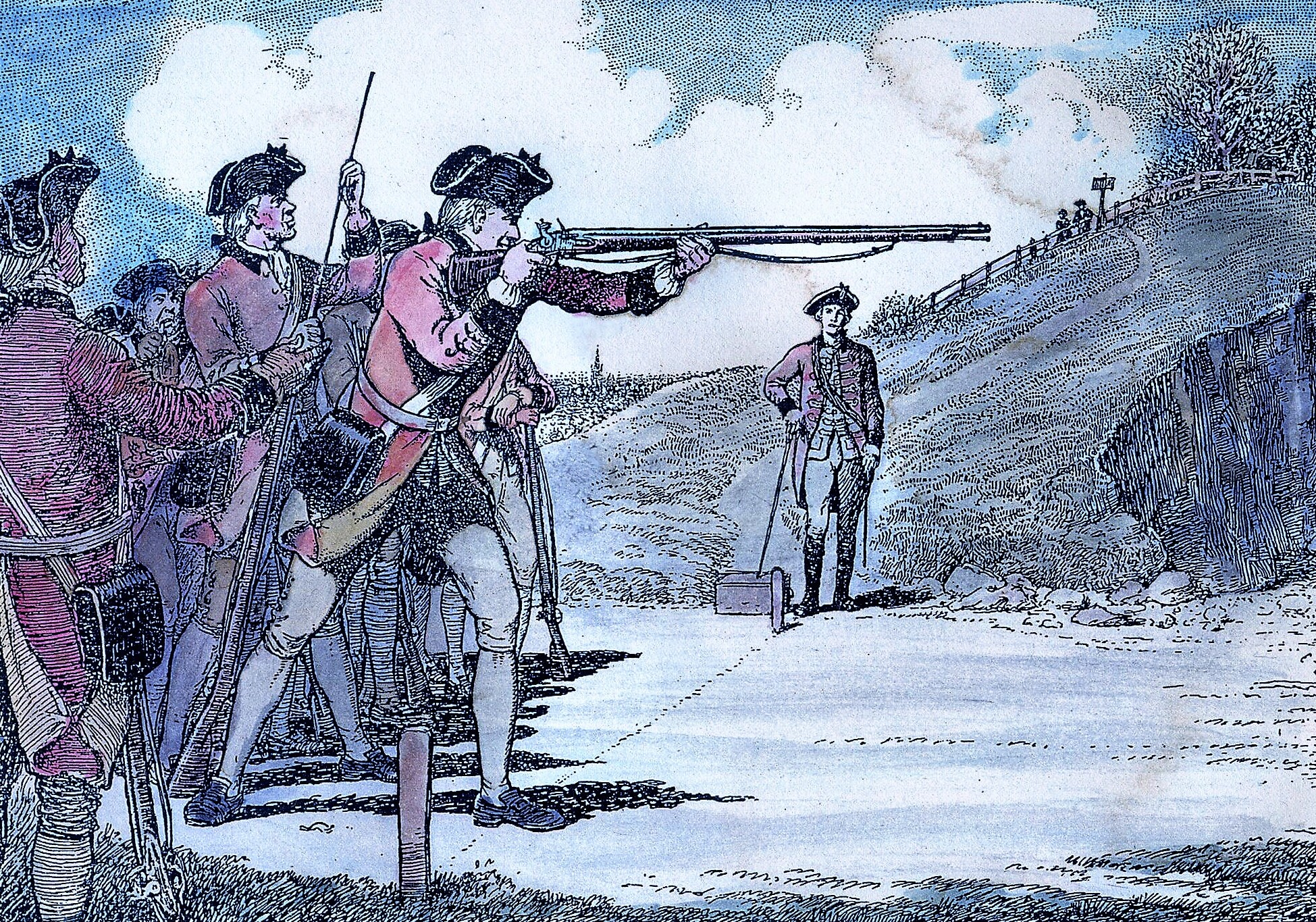
The Norfolk Militia undergoing musketry training in 1759

Under threat of French invasion during the Seven Years' War a series of Militia Acts from 1757 reorganised the county militia regiments, the men being conscripted by means of parish ballots (paid substitutes were permitted) to serve for three years. In peacetime they assembled for 28 days' annual training. There was a property qualification for officers, who were commissioned by the lord lieutenant. An adjutant and drill sergeants were to be provided to each regiment from the Regular Army, and arms and accoutrements would be supplied when the county had secured 60 per cent of its quota of recruits.

Norfolk's quota was set at 960 men in two battalions, with the City of Norwich contributing 151 of the men. The Lord Lieutenant of Norfolk, George Walpole, 3rd Earl of Orford, was an enthusiast for the militia, and made rapid progress with the assistance of the Townshend family, particularly Colonel George Townshend, MP for Norfolk, a Regular soldier who promoted the militia legislation in parliament. A number of old soldiers were recruited as sergeants to train the balloted men, and a number of volunteers to the ranks were appointed as corporals. Both battalions received their arms from the Tower of London on 7 October 1758 and paraded at Fakenham in November. Orford appointed Townshend as colonel of the 1st or Western Battalion and Sir Armine Wodehouse, 5th Baronet, of the 2nd or Eastern Battalion. The two battalions were embodied (mobilised) for fulltime service on 24 June 1759 and on 4 July marched by four 'divisions' (half battalions) to Portsmouth to do duty under Major General Holmes. Due to the heat, they set off soon after midnight, but were described as being in good spirits. The Western Battalion would have been under the command of Lieutenant-Colonel William Windham, because Townshend was serving as a brigadier in Wolfe's expedition to Quebec. En route the two battalions passed through London and under Orford's command were reviewed by King George II in front of Kensington Palace. They were the first of the reformed militia regiments 'which offered to march wherever they might be most serviceable to the public defence', and the King ordered that they 'should be distinguished by the title of Militia Royal', but this was never done. The Prince of Wales (soon to be King George III) also showed the Norfolk Militia favour. (Note: Norfolk claimed to have raised the first regiment under the new Acts, but it was actually the second county regiment (after Dorset) to be issued with arms.)

By August the divisions of the two battalions were alternately guarding prisoners of war and undergoing training. While at Hilsea Barracks, Portsmouth, Windham published a drill manual, A Plan of Discipline, Composed for the Use of the Militia of the County of Norfolk, probably drawing on Townshend's knowledge, and which Townshend revised in 1768 after Windham's death. This is said to have become one of the most important drill manuals employed during the American Revolution. However, a report on the West Norfolks said that the officers were not well chosen, and the adjutant had been incapacitated by a stroke.

Hilsea Barracks proved to be infected with smallpox, dysentery and typhus, and the men from isolated Norfolk villages with little immunity succumbed in large numbers. Casualties were severe, and those who did not die suffered long convalescences. In October the Norfolks were relieved by the Warwickshire Militia, but only after the barracks had been thoroughly cleaned.

During the autumn of 1759–60 the Norfolk companies were first dispersed in billets across Hampshire and Surrey, and then in November they were marched to Cirencester in Gloucestershire, where they were joined by a recruiting party and recruits from Norwich. Thereafter the battalions were posted to various towns for garrison duty and to guard prisoners. On 28 May 1761 King George granted Regimental colours to the two battalions of the Norfolk Militia.

With the Seven Years War drawing to an end, orders to disembody (demobilise) the two Norfolk battalions were issued on 15 December 1762. Annual training continued thereafter: the West Norfolks usually at East Dereham. Ballots were held regularly, and officers were commissioned to fill vacancies.

=== American War of Independence ===
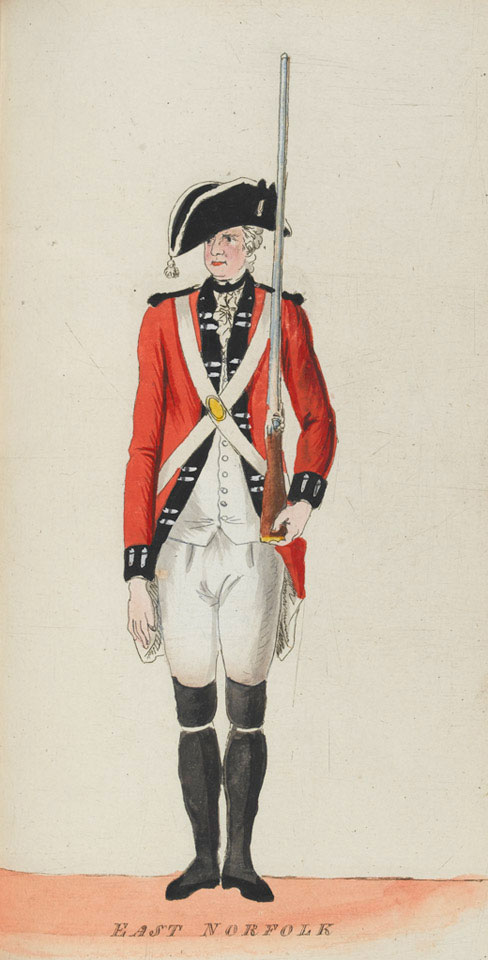
c. 1780 engraving of an East Norfolk Militia private

The militia was called out after the outbreak of the War of American Independence when the country was threatened with invasion by the Americans' allies, France and Spain. Orford ordered the Norfolk Militia to assemble on 13 April 1778 and he took personal command of the Western battalion. On its first assembly, Orford dismissed 20 'misshapen, underlimbed, distempered men' and told his deputies to send only 'sizeable, able-bodied men'. The battalion was reviewed on Mousehold Heath outside Norwich by Lt-Gen Sir Richard Pierson in mid-May.

It became normal policy to gather the militia regiments into encampments during the summer months where they could be exercised in larger formations, but the West Norfolks spent most of their embodied service camped by themselves on coast defence duties. The regiment benefited from the training opportunities of these camps even though isolated from other units, and despite Orford's bouts of mental illness he was enthusiastic and enterprising. He had instruction cards printed, and the regiment was put through every manoeuvre in Lord Amherst's instructions. At Aldeburgh in 1778 the regiment carried out a mock sea battle, practising forming orderly lines and columns of boats directed by flag signal, and in volley firing from the boats. The culmination was to row out and surround a ship moored offshore, fire two volleys and then board it with fixed bayonets, with a prize for the first boat to board. At the end of the camp the inspecting officer observed that 'they must have been a great deal manoeuvred and likely to be ready and attentive to orders in the noise and confusion of service', though he complained that they were not so good on parade. Orford was keen on marksmanship, and his 600-strong regiment used some 14,000 rounds of ammunition each camping season, then considered a large amount. The results were good by 18th century standards of musketry: on one occasion in 1780 130 shots out of 600 hit the target. One company that consistently won the shooting competitions was accused of loading with two balls instead of one, so Orford carried out experiments to see if this was a good idea.

A frequent task for the militia was chasing smugglers. While camped at Aldeburgh in 1779 the West Norfolks sent a party 4 miles (6 km) up the coast to intercept a cutter that was landing contraband. They were too late to intercept the boat, but found casks of spirits hidden in a cave. A party was left to prevent more landings. A little later a landing was made at Dunwich, and 20 militiamen mounted on baggage horses chased the smugglers for 40 miles (64 km) in 4 hours, capturing a letter giving details of the next run. Again, a detachment was sent to camp at the landing point, to deter a cutter that was loitering offshore. Orford remarked that the clergy, lawyers and doctors of the area were all smugglers, and in Aldeburgh itself every inhabitant was one except the parson. The government always took the precaution of stationing the militia outside their own counties, so that they would not be called upon to fight their friends and relations. When the regiment camped by itself in 1779 and 1780, Orford took upon himself the role of food contractor, supplying the cattle and sheep rather than relying on the retail market.

In February 1780 the battalion was billeted at Ipswich. In August it was camped on Tenpenny Common, and on 18 August it was reviewed by its former commanding officer, now Lt-Gen Viscount Townshend, Master-General of the Ordnance, on his way to Landguard Fort. It went into winter quarters at Hull in November 1780. In May 1782 it was at Swaffham and Dereham on its way to camp at Caister near Yarmouth. At Caister the Earl of Orford erected a battery for four cannon between the camp and the sea. The battalion was reviewed at Herringfleet by Gen Henry Conway in September. The camp at Caister broke up in mid-November and the battalion marched back through Norwich to winter quarters in Dereham, Swaffham, King's Lynn and Downham Market. The Treaty of Paris to end the war was now being negotiated, and the militia could be stood down. The West Norfolks were disembodied at King's Lynn in March 1783. From 1784 to 1792 the militia were supposed to assemble for 28 days' annual training, even though to save money only two-thirds of the men were actually called out each year. In 1786 the number of permanent non-commissioned officers (NCOs) was reduced. The Earl of Orford died in 1791 and was succeeded on 31 March 1792 by his kinsman, the Hon Horatio Walpole, MP for King's Lynn.

=== French Revolutionary War ===
The militia had already been called out before Revolutionary France declared war on Britain on 1 February 1793. George Townshend, now 1st Marquess Townshend and Lord Lieutenant of Norfolk, was ordered on 19 December to embody (mobilise) the Norfolk Militia. The French Revolutionary Wars saw a new phase for the English militia: they were embodied for a whole generation, and became regiments of full-time professional soldiers (though restricted to service in the British Isles), which the Regular Army increasingly saw as a prime source of recruits. They served in coast defences, manned garrisons, guarded prisoners of war, and carried out internal security duties, while their traditional local defence duties were taken over by the Volunteers and mounted Yeomanry.

In August 1793 the West Norfolk regiment, with 8 companies, was at Lexden Camp in Essex, along with the East Kent and South Lincolnshire Militia. In May 1794 the regiment was in camp at Danbury, Essex, in June 1795 at a large camp at Warley, Essex, under Lt-Gen Cornwallis, and it was at Shorncliffe Army Camp in Kent in October 1796.

In September 1798 the officers and most of the men of the West Norfolk Militia volunteered for service in Ireland during the Irish Rebellion, but their offer was not accepted. With the signing of the Treaty of Amiens the war ended and the militia were disembodied in 1802.

=== Napoleonic Wars ===
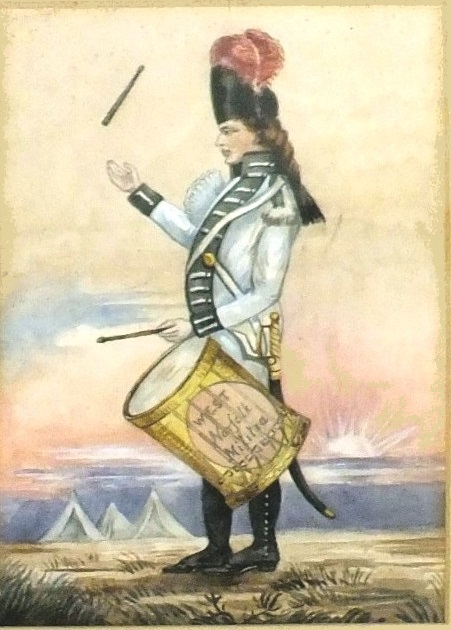
Illustration of a West Norfolk Militia drummer

However, the Peace of Amiens was short-lived and Britain declared war on France once more on 18 May 1803, the West and East Norfolk regiments having already been re-embodied at Yarmouth, East Dereham and Swaffham on 21 March. In June 1804 the West and East Norfolks, with other militia regiments, were stationed at Colchester, using Lexden Heath for parades. On 25 July 1804 both regiments marched from Colchester barracks and arrived at Coxheath Camp in Kent on 27 July after a rapid and fatiguing march. The East and West Norfolks with the Royal Buckinghamshire Militia formed Maj-Gen Baird's Brigade.

Large numbers of militia were recruited into the Regulars during 1805, and recourse was made to the ballot to make up the numbers, when large amounts were paid for substitutes, though the establishments of the Norfolk regiments were reduced to the numbers before the Supplementaries were added (98 NCOs and drummers, 786 privates).

During the invasion crisis of 1805, while Napoleon assembled an expeditionary force across the English Channel at Boulogne, the Norfolk Militia were stationed in the Southern District (Sussex), the most vulnerable sector. Together with the Nottinghamshire Militia the East and West Norfolks formed a brigade under Maj Gen Alexander Mackenzie Fraser, defending Dungeness, with headquarters (HQ) in Winchelsea. On 1 September the West Norfolks had 712 men under Lt Col George Nelthorpe at Clifford Camp, together with five companies of the East Norfolks. The West Norfolks were inspected at Canterbury by the Commander-in-Chief, the Duke of York, in August 1806.

On 16 August 1809 the West Norfolk Militia, under the command of Col Walpole (now the 2nd Earl of Orford of the third creation), marched from Colchester into Norwich, the first time the regiment had been stationed in the city for nearly 30 years. In May 1811 they were at King's Lynn and in December that year they were at Woodbridge, Suffolk, from where they went to Harwich.

=== Norman Cross Depot ===
A purpose-built Prisoner-of-war camp, the first of its type, was provided at Norman Cross, near Peterborough. Detachments of the Norfolk Militia became heavily involved in operating the camp and in escorting prisoners there from Yarmouth. Lieutenant Thomas Borrow of the West Norfolk Militia, father of the author George Borrow, was quartered at Norman Cross from July 1811 to April 1813 and George spent his ninth and tenth years in the barracks there. He later dramatised the prison in his book Lavengro.

By April 1813 the regiment was stationed at Berwick-upon-Tweed, and from there it went to Edinburgh Castle.

=== Ireland ===
The West Norfolk Militia was disembodied in 1814, following Napoleon's defeat and abdication. However, on his escape from Elba, the West Norfolks were assembled by beat of drum in April 1815, preparatory to being re-embodied in June during the Hundred Days campaign. After Napoleon's final defeat at Waterloo the bulk of the British Army was engaged in occupation duties in France, and the West Norfolks volunteered for service in Ireland. On 15 September the regiment, 800 strong, marched to Harwich, where it embarked. It was stationed at Clonmel and Templemore until it returned to England in April 1816. Once again, George Borrow accompanied his father (now a captain) on this service and dramatised it in Lavengro.

The regiment returned to Norwich on 11 May 1816 and so was on hand to help put down the riots that broke out in the city in June. The regiment was finally disembodied on 27 June.

=== Long Peace ===
After Waterloo there was another long peace. Although officers continued to be commissioned into the militia and ballots were still held until suspended by the Militia Act 1829, the regiments were rarely assembled for training and the permanent staffs of sergeants and drummers (who were occasionally used to maintain public order) were progressively reduced.

Horatio Walpole, 3rd Earl of Orford (of the third creation) was appointed colonel of the West Norfolks on 26 June 1822 after the death of his father. His lt-col was George Nelthorpe, who had been appointed in 1799, and both retained these positions until after the 1852 reforms.

== 1852 reforms ==
The Militia of the United Kingdom was revived by the Militia Act 1852, enacted during a renewed period of international tension. As before, units were raised and administered on a county basis, and filled by voluntary enlistment (although conscription by means of the Militia Ballot might be used if the counties failed to meet their quotas). Training was for 56 days on enlistment, then for 21–28 days per year, during which the men received full army pay. Under the Act, Militia units could be embodied by Royal Proclamation for full-time home defence service in three circumstances:

1. 'Whenever a state of war exists between Her Majesty and any foreign power'.
2. 'In all cases of invasion or upon imminent danger thereof'.
3. 'In all cases of rebellion or insurrection'.

The West and East Norfolk Militia regiments were reformed in 1853, and a Norfolk Artillery Militia was also formed, partly by transfers from the two infantry regiments. The West Norfolks were called out for 28 days' training on 25 April 1854.

=== Crimean War and Indian Mutiny ===
War with Russia broke out in 1854 and an expeditionary force was sent to the Crimea. The militia then began to be called out for home defence. All three Norfolk regiments were embodied on 27 December 1854, the West Norfolks commanded by Lt-Col H.F.C. Custance. Because of the way the 1852 Act had been drafted, a number of men enlisted before April 1854 had to be released, reducing the effective strength of the West Norfolks by 200 to only 460. However, an increased bounty induced many of them to re-enlist.

In June 1855 the West Norfolk Militia was presented with new Colours by the Countess of Albemarle. The Earl of Orford (now fulfilling the role of Honorary Colonel of the regiment) replied to her speech, and the colours were then trooped and the regiment marched past.

Early next month the West Norfolk Militia went to Aldershot Camp and then to Fermoy Barracks in Ireland. With the ending of the war the regiment returned to Norwich in June 1856, where it was disembodied the following month.

The West Norfolk Militia was called out again for garrison duty when much of the army was sent to quell the Indian Mutiny. It was embodied on 10 November 1857, about 700 strong. On 23 December Battalion HQ and three companies under Lt-Col Custance went by rail to Chester, three companies under Maj Bedingfield to Liverpool and the other two under Capt Marsham to Stockport. In April 1858 the regiment returned to Norwich and was disembodied shortly afterwards.

=== Thorpe rail disaster, 1874 ===
Two serving members of the West Norfolk Militia, Sgt Major Frederick Cassell and Sgt Robert Ward, are recorded to have been killed in the Thorpe rail accident whilst returning from a fishing trip. Their bodies were recovered and they were buried with full military honours. Ward had previously been in the Coldstream Guards.

== Cardwell and Childers Reforms ==
Under the 'Localisation of the Forces' scheme introduced by the Cardwell Reforms of 1872, militia regiments were brigaded with their local Regular and Volunteer battalions. Sub-District No 31 (County of Norfolk) set up its depot at Gorleston Barracks at Great Yarmouth. It comprised:

- 1st and 2nd Battalions, 9th (Norfolk) Regiment of Foot
- West Norfolk Militia at Norwich
- East Norfolk Militia at Yarmouth
- 1st (City of Norwich) Norfolk Rifle Volunteer Corps
- 2nd (Great Yarmouth) Norfolk Rifle Volunteer Corps
- 3rd Norfolk Rifle Volunteer Corps at East Dereham
- 4th Norfolk Rifle Volunteer Corps at Norwich

Militia battalions now had a large cadre of permanent staff (about 30) and a number of the officers were former Regulars. Around a third of the recruits and many young officers went on to join the Regular Army. The Militia Reserve introduced in 1867 consisted of present and former militiamen who undertook to serve overseas in case of war. They were called out in 1878 during the international crisis caused by the Russo-Turkish War.

Following the Cardwell Reforms a mobilisation scheme began to appear in the Army List from December 1875. This assigned Regular and Militia units to places in an order of battle of corps, divisions and brigades for the 'Active Army', even though these formations were entirely theoretical, with no staff or services assigned. The West and East Norfolk Militia were both assigned to 1st Brigade of 2nd Division, VII Corps. The brigade would have mustered at Northampton in time of war.

=== 3rd Battalion, Norfolk Regiment ===
The Childers Reforms of 1881 completed the Cardwell process by converting the Regular regiments into county regiments and incorporating the militia battalions into them. The 9th Foot became the Norfolk Regiment with the following organisation:

- 1st and 2nd Battalions, Norfolk Regiment
- 3rd (1st Norfolk Militia) Battalion, Norfolk Regiment
- 4th (2nd Norfolk Militia) Battalion, Norfolk Regiment
- 1st –4th Volunteer Battalions, Norfolk Regiment

Britannia Barracks, which took its name from the regimental badge, was built between 1885 and 1887 on Mousehold Heath at the edge of Norwich as a depot for the Norfolk Regiment and this became the base for the 3rd Bn.

The 3rd and 4th Battalions Norfolks, the Norfolk Artillery Militia, and the 3rd (West Suffolk Militia) Battalion, Suffolk Regiment, were brigaded together at Great Yarmouth for annual training in 1899.

=== Second Boer War ===
With the bulk of the Regular Army serving in South Africa during the Second Boer War, the Militia were called out. The 3rd Battalion was embodied on 25 January 1900

The battalion volunteered for overseas service and on 25 February embarked with a strength of 22 officers and 503 other ranks (ORs) under the command of Col F.H. Custance. It arrived at Cape Town and then sailed on to East London where it disembarked on 21 March 1900. On 4 April it concentrated at Bethulie in the Orange Free State and then went to Springfontein and Edenburg, dropping off small detachments to guard bridges and culverts along the way. On 13 July the battalion moved to Kaffir River, between Edenburg and Bloemfontein, battalion HQ remaining there for a year while the blockhouse line was established, with Col Custance appointed commandant of the 50 miles (80 km) section. The line was often attacked, the Kaffir River being a favourite spot for Boer despatch riders to try to cross the line. On 13 July 1901 the battalion proceeded to Norvalspont where the main line railway crossed the Orange River, and occupied the blockhouse line for 12 miles (19 km) south and 18 miles (29 km) north of the river. The line was often attacked, but the barbed wire, trenches parallel to the railway line, and telephone communication made it an almost impassable barrier to the Boers. Early in 1902 the battalion embarked for the UK where it was disembodied on 11 April 1902.

One officer of the battalion was killed while attached to 2nd Bn Norfolks; 11 ORs were killed or died of disease during their service with the battalion. The battalion was awarded the Battle Honour South Africa 1900–02 and the men received the Queen's South Africa Medal with the clasps for 'Cape Colony' and 'Orange Free State', and the King's South Africa Medal with clasps for '1901' and '1902'.

== Special Reserve ==
After the Boer War, the future of the militia was called into question. There were moves to reform the Auxiliary Forces (Militia, Yeomanry and Volunteers) to take their place in the six Army Corps proposed by the Secretary of State for War, St John Brodrick. However, little of Brodrick's scheme was carried out. Under the more sweeping Haldane Reforms of 1908, the Militia was replaced by the Special Reserve (SR), a semi-professional force whose role was to provide reinforcement drafts for regular units serving overseas in wartime, rather like the earlier Militia Reserve. The battalion became the 3rd (Reserve) Battalion, Norfolk Regiment, on 31 May 1908.

=== 3rd (Reserve) Battalion ===
On the outbreak of World War I on 4 August 1914 the battalion was embodied at Norwich under the command of Lt-Col W. Corrie Tonge, DSO. The first task of the permanent staff was to assist the depot staff at Britannia Barrack to call up, clothe and equip the Army Reservists: 800 had been processed by midnight on 6 August, of which 700 had been despatched in two drafts to the 1st Battalion mobilising at Holywood in Northern Ireland, before proceeding to the Western Front. On 8 August the SR battalion was mobilised with a strength of about 600 and next day it went to its war station at Felixstowe where together with the SR battalions of the Suffolk Regiment, Bedfordshire Regiment, Essex Regiment and Loyal North Lancashire Regiment, the 3rd Bn Norfolks formed an SR brigade to relieve the Territorial Force battalions in the Harwich Defences. The first task for the SR brigade was to dig entrenchments and erect barbed wire to supplement the defences, after which intensive training began. As well as defence tasks, the battalion's role was to equip Special Reservists, new recruits and returning wounded and send them as reinforcement drafts to the regular battalions of the Norfolks serving overseas. At times the strength of the 3rd Bn reached 100 officers and 3000 ORs. The 10th (Reserve) Bn (see below) was formed alongside it in the Harwich Garrison in October to supply drafts to the 'Kitchener's Army' battalions of the Norfolks that were being raised. Lieutenant-Col Tonge was succeeded in command by Col Sir Kenneth Kemp, 12th Baronet, returning from retirement, and finally by Lt-Col C.M. Jickling, who held the command from July 1917 to July 1919.

3rd Norfolks spent the whole war in the Harwich Garrison, sending drafts to the fighting battalions: 724 officers passed through the battalion, 13,029 ORs were sent to battalions of the Norfolks, and 5854 to other units, many to the Essex Regiment. In June–July 1915 a draft of 300 volunteers from the battalion for the 1st Essex was aboard HM Transport Royal Edward when she was torpedoed and sunk in the Aegean Sea on the way to Gallipoli. Only 18 of the 300 Norfolk men were picked up; afterwards the 3rd Bn Norfolks despatched another 150-man draft to the Essex Regiment. When the 2nd Norfolks was besieged at Kut al Amara from December 1915 the relieving force included a large draft for the battalion, which had arrived from the UK. This was combined with a similar draft for the 2nd Dorset Regiment to form a 'Composite English Battalion' in 21st Indian Brigade of 7th (Meerut) Division. This battalion was nicknamed the 'Norsets' and fought in the desperate attempts to break through to Kut. After the fall of Kut the Norsets continued in service until further reinforcements arrived and the 2nd Norfolks and 2nd Dorsets were reconstituted. Under War Office Instruction 106 of 10 November 1915 the 3rd Bn was ordered to send a draft of 109 men to the new Machine Gun Training Centre at Grantham where they were to form the basis of a brigade machine-gun company of the new Machine Gun Corps. In addition, 10 men at a time were to undergo training at Grantham as battalion machine gunners. The order stated that 'Great care should be taken in the selection of men for training as machine gunners as only well educated and intelligent men are suitable for this work'.

No invasion force ever threatened the Harwich Defences during the war, but from January 1915 German airships and later aircraft were sometimes seen passing over the coast. On 4 July and 22 July 1917 squadrons of aircraft bombed the Felixstowe area, causing numerous casualties among the garrison and civilians, though the Norfolks escaped unscathed.

Hostilities ended with the Armistice with Germany in November 1918, but in March 1919 the 3rd Bn was moved to Ireland, where it was quartered in Victoria Barracks, Belfast. Its role was peacekeeping between the different religious communities during the crisis preceding the Partition of Ireland. Between March and July the 3rd Bn was progressively turned into the peacetime Regular 1st Bn, after which battalion HQ was absorbed by the 1st Bn and returned to England to be disembodied.

=== 10th (Reserve) Battalion ===
After Lord Kitchener issued his call for volunteers in August 1914, the battalions of the 1st, 2nd and 3rd New Armies ('K1', 'K2' and 'K3' of 'Kitchener's Army') were quickly formed at the regimental depots, which struggled to cope with the influx of volunteers. The SR battalions also swelled with new recruits and were soon well above their establishment strength. On 8 October 1914 each SR battalion was ordered to use the surplus to form a service battalion of the 4th New Army ('K4'). Accordingly, the 3rd (Reserve) Bn in the Harwich defences formed the 10th (Service) Bn, Norfolk Regiment at Walton-on-the-Naze in October. It became part of 94th Brigade in 31st Division. In April 1915 the War Office decided to convert the K4 battalions into 2nd Reserve units, providing drafts for the K1–K3 battalions in the same way that the SR was doing for the Regular battalions. 94th Brigade became 6th Reserve Brigade and the Norfolk battalion became 10th (Reserve) Battalion, at Colchester, where it trained drafts for the 7th, 8th and 9th (Service) Bns of the regiment. In March 1916 it returned to Parkeston, Harwich. On 1 September 1916 the 2nd Reserve battalions were transferred to the Training Reserve (TR) and the battalion was redesignated 25th Training Reserve Bn, still in 6th Reserve Bde. The training staff retained their Norfolks badges. It was redesignated 249th (Infantry) Bn, TR on 4 July 1917, then on 24 October 1917 it was transferred to the Bedfordshire Regiment as 51st (Graduated) Bn and continued training reinforcements until the end of the war. On 8 February 1919 it was converted into a service battalion and in March went to Germany where it joined 102nd Brigade in Eastern Division of the British Army of the Rhine. The division was disbanded in July 1919 and the battalion returned to the UK and was finally disbanded on 27 March 1920 at Catterick Camp.

=== Postwar ===
The disembodied SR resumed its old title of Militia in 1921 but like most militia units the 3rd Norfolks remained in abeyance after World War I. By the outbreak of World War II in 1939, no officers remained listed for the battalion. The Militia was formally disbanded in April 1953.

== Commanders ==
=== Colonels ===
The following served as Colonel of the Regiment:

- Field Marshal George Townshend, 1st Marquess Townshend, Col of the West Norfolk Militia from 1759.
- George Walpole, 3rd Earl of Orford (of the second creation), as Lord Lieutenant was Colonel of the whole Norfolk Militia 1759; later Col of the West Norfolk Militia until 31 March 1792.
- Horatio Walpole, 2nd Earl of Orford (of the third creation), from Lt-Col East Norfolk Militia appointed 19 March 1792.
- Horatio Walpole, 3rd Earl of Orford (of the third creation), appointed 26 June 1822.

Following the 1852 Militia Act the rank of colonel was abolished in the militia and the lieutenant-colonel became the commanding officer (CO); at the same time, the position of Honorary Colonel was introduced.

=== Lieutenant-Colonels ===
Lieutenant-Colonels of the regiment (commanding officers after 1852) included the following:

- Lt-Col William Windham, from 1759; died 30 October 1761.
- Lt-Col George Nelthorpe, appointed 2 April 1799; until 1854
- Lt-Col Hambleton Francis Custance, promoted 16 May 1854; appointed Hon Col 17 August 1881
- Lt-Col Randall R. Burroughs, promoted 5 October 1881
- Lt-Col F.W. Garnett, promoted 17 March 1888
- Lt-Col Frederic H. Custance, former Capt & Lt-Col, Grenadier Guards, promoted 4 April 1896
- Lt-Col Sir Kenneth Hagar Kemp, 12th Baronet, promoted 15 October 1904
- Lt-Col W. Corrie Tonge, DSO, retired Regular Major, promoted 27 August 1910.
- Lt-Col E.W. Margesson, CMG, retired Regular Brevet Lt-Col, appointed 28 August 1917.

=== Honorary Colonels ===
The following served as Honorary Colonel of the regiment:

- Sir Hambleton Francis Custance, KCB, appointed 17 August 1881.
- Gen Sir Edward Bulwer, KCB, appointed 29 July 1896.
- Col Frederic H. Custance, CB, appointed 8 February 1905; re-appointed under Special Reserve

=== Other notable members ===
- Hon Frederick Walpole, younger son of the 3rd Earl of Orford (of the third creation) was an officer in the Royal Navy and simultaneously captain (18 March 1852) and later major (17 May 1859) in the West Norfolk Militia; MP for North Norfolk; died 1876.

== Heritage & ceremonial ==
=== Uniforms & Insignia ===
When the Norfolk Militia paraded at Kensington Palace in 1759 the uniform was red with black facings, and the West Norfolks retained these until at least 1780. There is a print of about 1780 showing a drummer of the regiment wearing a white coat with black facings. Normally drummers wore 'reversed' colours, ie a coat of the facing colour, faced red; however, when the facing colour was black or red, the drummer's coat was white, with the normal facing colour. The West Norfolks changed to white facings before 1846. In 1881 the West Norfolks adopted the uniform of the Norfolk Regiment, which in that year was obliged to adopt white facings as an English line regiment. The only militia distinction worn on the Norfolks' uniform was the letter 'M' on the shoulder strap. The Norfolk Regiment, including its militia battalions, regained its traditional yellow facings in 1905.

The badge of the Norfolk Militia regiments was the Coat of arms of the City of Norwich, with a castle above a lion of England. In 1881 they adopted the Britannia badge of the Norfolk Regiment, but the officers of all the battalions of the Norfolk Regiment wore the castle on their waistbelt plate.

The buttons of the 1st Norfolk Militia about 1800–33 carried the design of an eight-pointed star with '1 NM' in the centre. The officers' Coatee buttons 1833–55 had the number '39' within a crowned circle with the regimental title inscribed on it, all superimposed on an eight-pointed cut star.

=== Precedence ===
In the Seven Years' War militia regiments camped together took precedence according to the order in which they had arrived. During the War of American Independence the counties were given an order of precedence determined by ballot each year. For the Norfolk Militia the positions were:

- 28th on 1 June 1778
- 34th on12 May 1779
- 9th on 6 May 1780
- 7th on 28 April 1781
- 33rd on 7 May 1782

The militia order of precedence balloted for in 1793 (Norfolk was 4th) remained in force throughout the French Revolutionary War: this still covered all the regiments in the county. Another ballot for precedence took place at the start of the Napoleonic War, when Norfolk was 46th.This order continued until 1833. In that year the King drew the lots for individual regiments and the resulting list remained in force with minor amendments until the end of the militia. The regiments raised before the peace of 1763 took the first 47 places: the West Norfolk was 39th and the East Norfolk was 40th. Although most regiments paid little notice to the additional number, the West Norfolk Militia did wear the numeral 39 on its buttons.

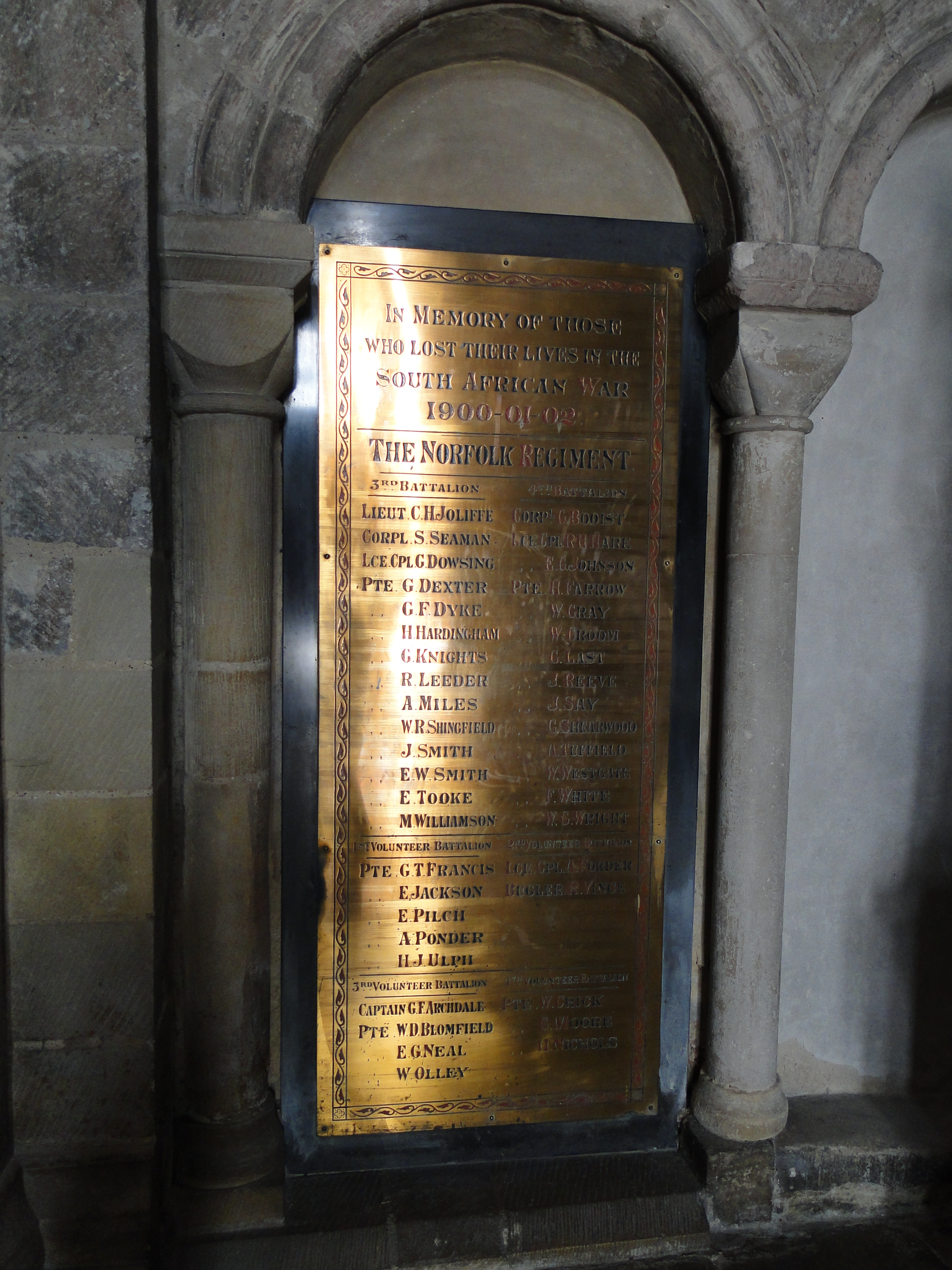
Boer War Memorial in Norwich Cathedral to the militia and volunteer battalions of the Norfolk Regiment.

=== Memorials ===
The names of the officers and men of militia and volunteer battalions of the Norfolk Regiment who died during the Second Boer War are engraved on a brass plate in Norwich Cathedral.

=== Battle Honour ===
The regiment bore the single Battle honour South Africa, awarded for its service in the Second Boer War. This was rescinded in 1910 when the Special Reserve battalions assumed the same honours as their parent regiments.

== See also ==
- Militia (Great Britain)
- Militia (United Kingdom)
- Special Reserve
- Norfolk Militia
- East Norfolk Militia
- Norfolk Artillery Militia
- Royal Norfolk Regiment
