= East Norfolk Militia =

Auxiliary unit of the British Army

2nd or East Norfolk Militia 4th Battalion, Norfolk Regiment
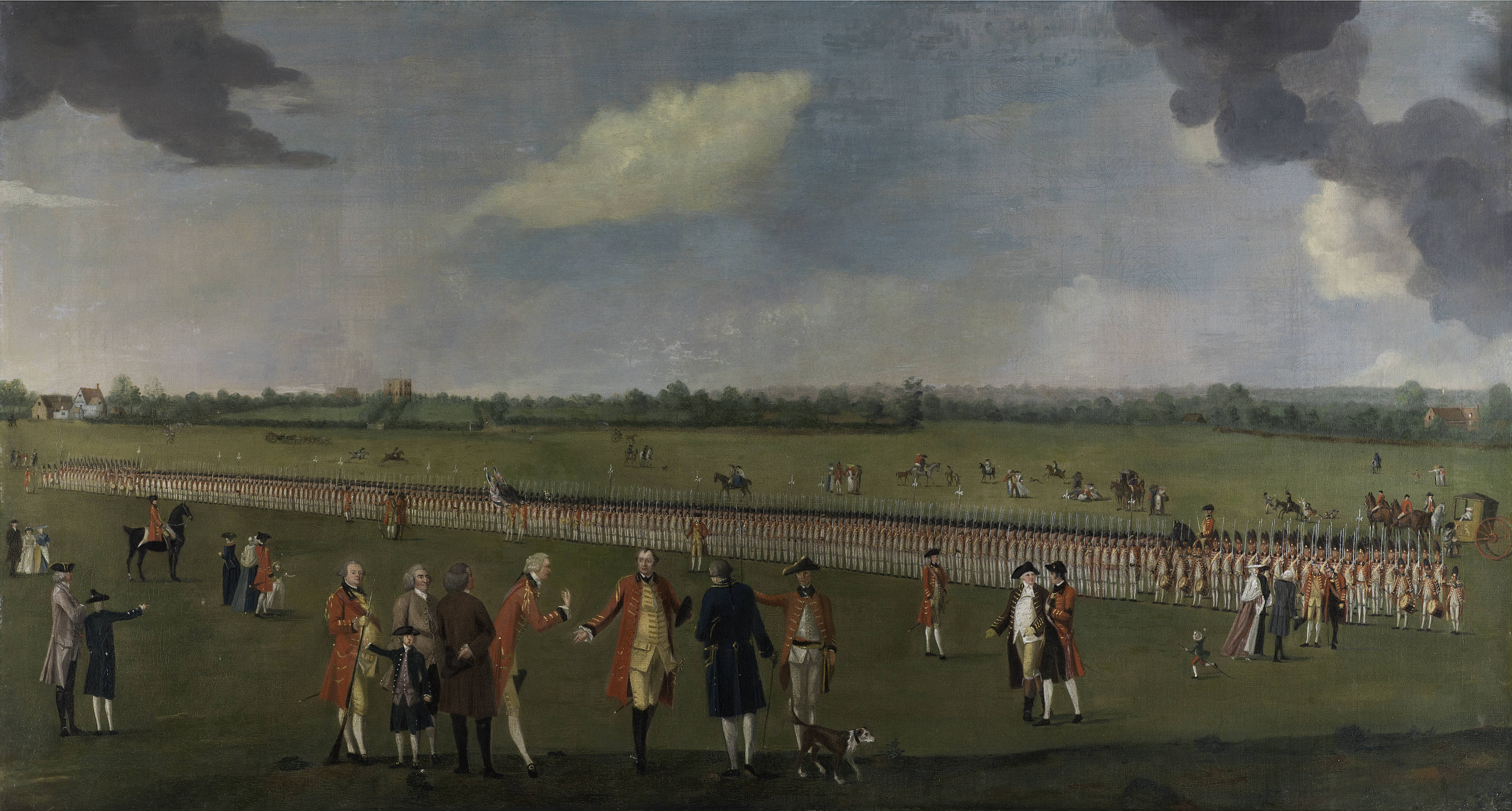
- c. 1759–1763 painting of the Norfolk Militia being reviewed
- Active: 7 October 1758–15 July 1908
- Country: Kingdom of Great Britain (1758–1800); United Kingdom (1801–1908)
- Branch: Militia
- Role: Infantry
- Size: 1 Battalion
- Part of: Norfolk Regiment
- Garrison/HQ: Great Yarmouth

Commanders
- Notable commanders: Sir Armine Wodehouse, 5th Baronet; John Wodehouse, 1st Baron Wodehouse; John Wodehouse, 2nd Baron Wodehouse; Sir Edmund Lacon, 3rd Baronet

The East Norfolk Militia was an auxiliary military unit in the English county of Norfolk in East Anglia. First organised during the Seven Years' War it carried out internal security and home defence duties in all of Britain's major wars. It later became a battalion of the Norfolk Regiment, but was disbanded in 1908.

== Background ==
The universal obligation to military service in the Shire levy was long established in England and its legal basis was updated by two acts of Parliament of 1557, which placed selected men, the 'Trained Bands', under the command of Lords Lieutenant appointed by the monarch. This is seen as the starting date for the organised county militia in England. It was an important element in the country's defence at the time of the Spanish Armada in the 1580s, and control of the militia was one of the areas of dispute between King Charles I and Parliament that led to the English Civil War. Although hardly employed during the civil wars, the Norfolk Trained Bands were active in controlling the country under the Commonwealth and Protectorate. The English militia was re-established under local control in 1662 after the Restoration of the monarchy, and Norfolk supported five regiments of foot and one of horse. However, after the Peace of Utrecht in 1715 the militia was allowed to decline.

== 1757 reforms ==
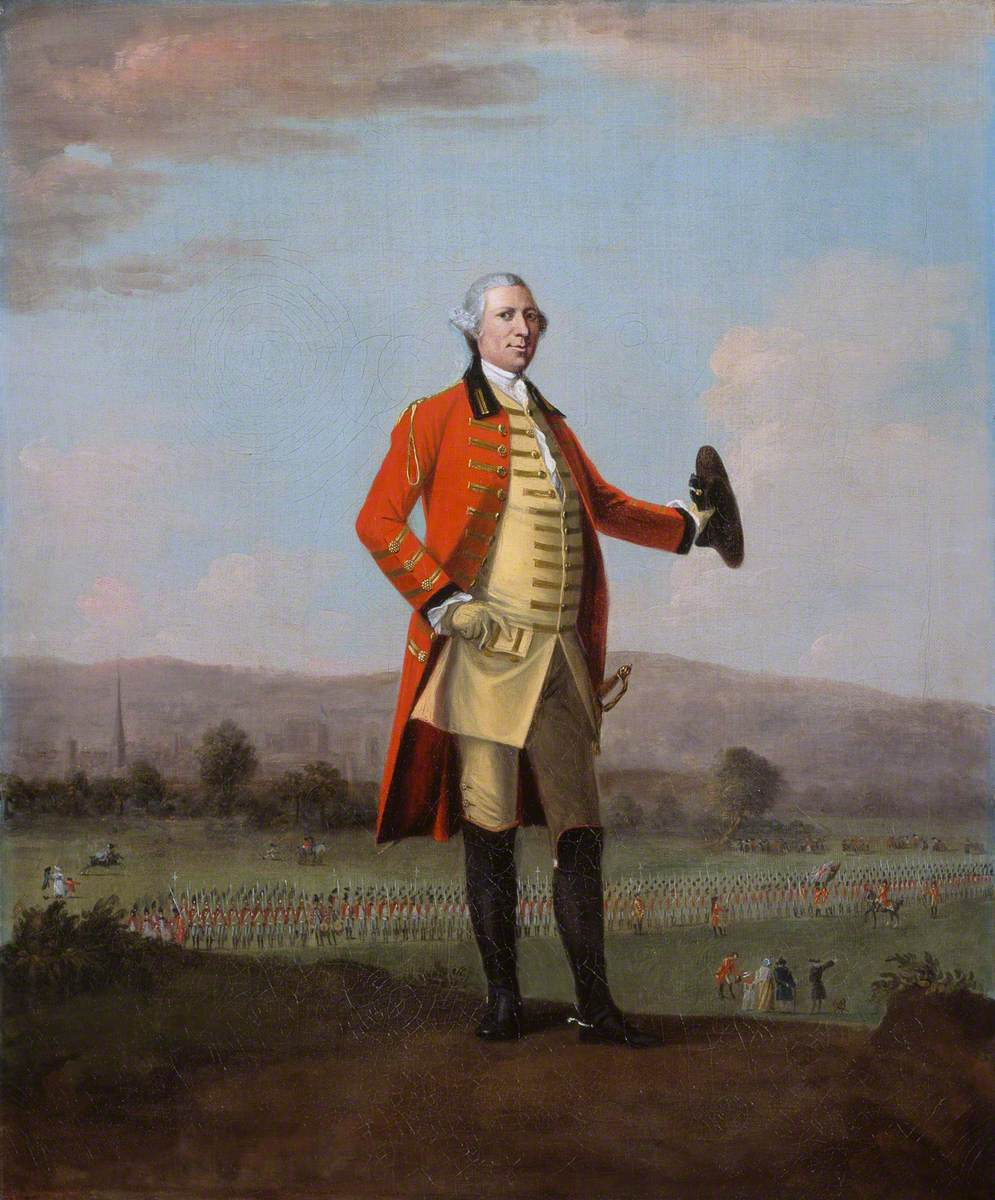
c. 1759 portrait of Armine Wodehouse reviewing the Eastern Battalion

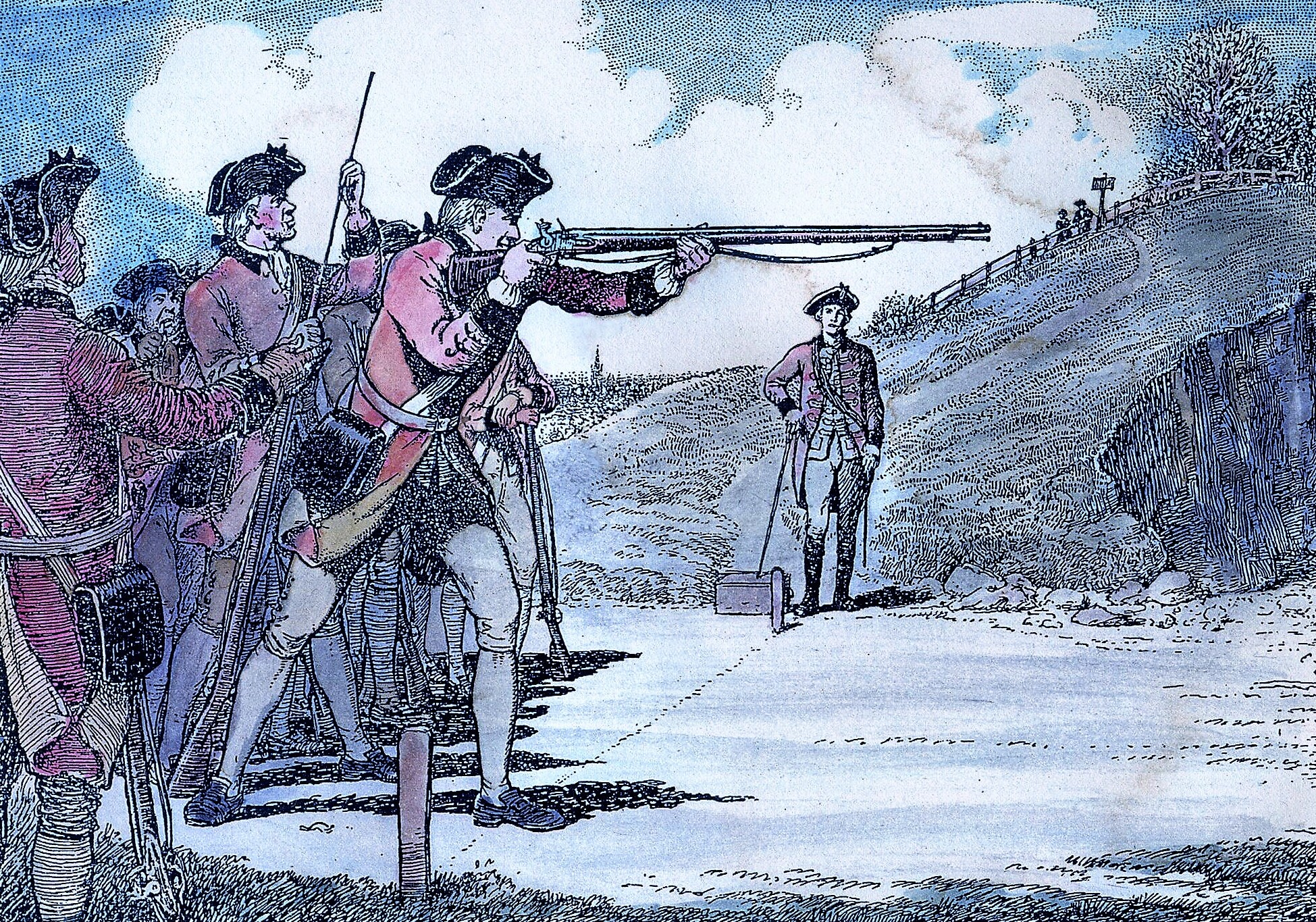
The Norfolk Militia undergoing musketry training in 1759

Under threat of French invasion during the Seven Years' War a series of Militia Acts from 1757 reorganised the county militia regiments, the men being conscripted by means of parish ballots (paid substitutes were permitted) to serve for three years. In peacetime they assembled for 28 days' annual training. There was a property qualification for officers, who were commissioned by the lord lieutenant. An adjutant and drill sergeants were to be provided to each regiment from the Regular Army, and arms and accoutrements would be supplied when the county had secured 60 per cent of its quota of recruits.

Norfolk's quota was set at 960 men in two battalions, the City of Norwich contributing 151 of the men. The Lord Lieutenant of Norfolk, the 3rd Earl of Orford, was an enthusiast for the militia, and made rapid progress with the assistance of the Townshend family, particularly Colonel George Townshend, MP for Norfolk, a regular soldier who promoted the militia legislation in parliament. Both battalions received their arms from the Tower of London on 7 October 1758 and paraded at Fakenham in November. Orford appointed George Townshend as Colonel of the 1st or Western Battalion and Sir Armine Wodehouse, 5th Baronet, of the 2nd or Eastern Battalion. Orford reviewed the Eastern Battalion on 4 June 1759 at Magdalen Fairstead, just outside Norwich, after they had completed their training there and at King's Lynn. The review was reported in the press, with the conduct of the men being praised. Orford reported the strength of the East Battalion as 33 officers, 24 serjeants, 23 drummers and 466 rank and file, organised in 12 companies, and that the two battalions would be ready to march at four days' notice. They were embodied for fulltime service on 24 June 1759 and on 4 July marched by four 'divisions' (half battalions) to Portsmouth to do duty. (The Western battalion would have been under the command of Lieutenant-Colonel William Windham, because Townshend was serving as a brigadier in Wolfe's expedition to Quebec.) En route the two battalions passed through London and under Orford's command were reviewed by King George II in front of Kensington Palace. They were the first of the reformed militia regiments 'which offered to march wherever they might be most serviceable to the public defence', and the King ordered that they 'should be distinguished by the title of Militia Royal', but this was never done. (Note: Norfolk claimed to have raised the first regiment under the new Acts, but it was actually the second county regiment (after Dorset) to be issued with arms.)

By August the divisions of the two battalions were alternately guarding prisoners of war and undergoing training. While at Hilsea Barracks, Portsmouth, Windham published a drill manual, A Plan of Discipline, Composed for the Use of the Militia of the County of Norfolk, drawing on Townshend's expert knowledge, and which Townshend revised in 1768 after Windham's death. This is said to have become one of the most important drill manuals employed during the American Revolution.

Hilsea Barracks was infected with Smallpox, Dysentery and Typhus, and the men from isolated Norfolk villages with little immunity succumbed in large numbers. Casualties were severe, and those who did not die suffered long convalescences. In October the Norfolks were relieved by the Warwickshire Militia, but only after the barracks had been thoroughly cleaned.

During the winter of 1759–60 the Norfolk companies were first dispersed in billets across Hampshire and Surrey, and then in November they were marched to Cirencester in Gloucestershire, where they were joined by a recruiting party and recruits from Norwich. In June 1760 the East battalion marched back to Norwich and Yarmouth, where they took over guarding French prisoners. On 28 May 1761 King George granted the two battalions of the Norfolk Militia a 'Warrant for Colours'. In June 1762 the East Battalion was ordered to leave a detachment at Yarmouth and to take over duties at Ipswich and Landguard Fort from the East Suffolk Militia. It was relieved in October and moved to winter quarters in King's Lynn and Fakenham, though the men were ordered to vacate Fakenham during the town's annual fair.

With the Seven Years' War drawing to an end orders to disembody the two Norfolk battalions were issued on 15 December 1762. Annual training continued thereafter – the East Norfolks usually at Norwich or Yarmouth – ballots were held regularly, and officers were commissioned to fill vacancies. Sir Armine Wodehouse gave up the command of the East Battalion and his eldest son John Wodehouse was promoted to Lt-Col on 19 May 1774 and then to Colonel on 6 June the same year. John Wodehouse, later 1st Lord Wodehouse, had marched as a private militiaman in the battalion under his father's command when it was first raised.

=== American War of Independence ===
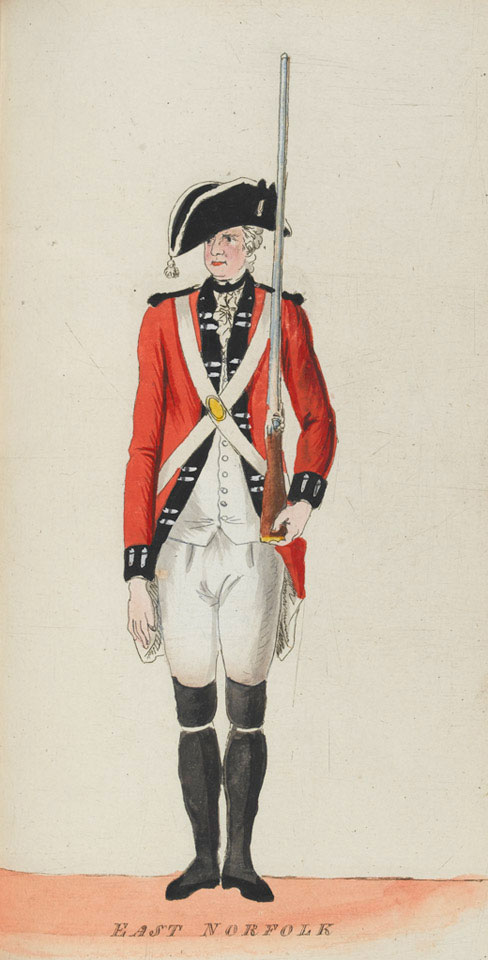
c. 1780 engraving of an East Norfolk Militia private

The militia was called out after the outbreak of the War of American Independence when the country was threatened with invasion by the Americans' allies, France and Spain. Orford ordered the Norfolk Militia to assemble on 13 April 1778, ammunition was issued, and the Eastern Battalion marched from Norwich to Yarmouth on 23 April. Here it was reviewed by Lt-Gen Sir Richard Pierson on 15 May, and then on 19 May was ordered to its war station at Harwich and Landguard Fort, with detachments billeted at Colchester and Manningtree. From June 1778 the East Norfolks are officially referred to as a 'regiment' rather than a 'battalion'; at this time it consisted of 8 companies. Detachments were moved around Essex during the summer and then in November the East Norfolks were ordered to exchange with the Cambridgeshire Militia and went back to Yarmouth for its winter quarters, arriving on 5 December.

On 4 June 1779 the East Norfolks marched to Coxheath Camp near Maidstone in Kent, which was the army's largest training camp. Here the militia were exercised under Lt-Gen Pierson as part of a division alongside Regular troops while providing a reserve in case of French invasion of South East England. The camp broke up in November and the East Norfolks marched back in two divisions to Yarmouth and King's Lynn for the winter. In February 1780 the division at King's Lynn joined the other at Yarmouth, then on 25 May the whole regiment was ordered to Tiptree Heath in Essex, where it joined two regular and six militia regiments in summer camp. The East Norfolks returned to Yarmouth in October. In May 1781 the regiment marched to Ipswich, with detachments across Suffolk at Woodbridge, Wickham Market and Saxmundham, where it was on standby to support revenue officers in catching smugglers. In June it took part in the King's Birthday Parade at Landguard Fort. It spent the winter at Yarmouth as usual, and in the summer of 1782 it went to Warley Camp in Essex. In November, now only 7 companies strong, the regiment marched to winter quarters dispersed around south-west Norfolk at Dereham, Attleborough, Harling, New Buckenham and places nearby.

The Treaty of Paris to end the war was now being negotiated, and the militia could be stood down. The East Norfolks were disembodied at Wymondham in March 1783.

From 1784 to 1792 the militia were supposed to assemble for 28 days' annual training, even though to save money only two-thirds of the men were actually called out each year. In 1786 the number of permanent non-commissioned officers (NCOs) was reduced.

=== French Revolutionary War ===
The East Norfolk Militia had already been called out on 19 December 1792 before Revolutionary France declared war on Britain on 1 February 1793. The French Revolutionary Wars saw a new phase for the English militia: they were embodied for a whole generation, and became regiments of full-time professional soldiers (though restricted to service in the British Isles), which the regular army increasingly saw as a prime source of recruits. They served in coast defences, manned garrisons, guarded prisoners of war, and carried out internal security duties, while their traditional local defence duties were taken over by the Volunteers and mounted Yeomanry.

The East Norfolk regiment began its service by marching its 8 companies to the Colchester neighbourhood on 15 February. Finding a suitable training ground in a town where a regiment was billeted could be a problem: the Secretary at War reluctantly agreed to repay the East Norfolks a guinea spent on hiring a ground at Colchester without prior permission. The regiment then went by way of Chelmsford to Chatham, Kent. On 1 July the regiment arrived to join a large militia encampment at Broadwater in Sussex. On 6 August the whole camp moved to Ashdown Forest for a few days before spending two weeks training at Brighton and then returning to Broadwater for the rest of the summer. In October the regiment marched in two divisions across Sussex and Hampshire and then back to Chichester in West Sussex for the winter.

In May 1794 the regiment went into camp on Fairlight Down above Hastings. By now it had been issued with two 6-pounder 'battalion guns'. In November it marched to Gravesend in North Kent for the winter. The following spring the regiment was quartered in the Medway Towns to prevent rioting, and then marched to summer camp at Deal, where it was brigaded with the Royal Lancashire and East Middlesex Militia under Maj-Gen Grenfield. The brigade was reviewed at Dover by the Commander-in-Chief, the Duke of York, in October, after which the East Norfolks wintered around Braintree, Essex, with a detachment guarding the Royal Gun Powder Magazine at Purfleet. When an election was held at Cheltenham in 1786 the regiment was temporarily moved out of nearby Braintree and quartered in the North London suburbs. For their summer training in 1797 the militia were again formed into brigades. The East Norfolks, together with the Cambridgeshires, West Suffolks and Warwickshires, formed the 2nd Brigade of General Sir William Howe's Division.

After 17 months at Chelmsford the East Norfolks were sent to Norman Cross Barracks in November 1797. Here the regiment guarded the huge Prisoner-of-war camp (see below). In March 1798 the regiment was ordered to Downham, Norfolk, and Wisbech, Cambridgeshire, and later to Cambridge and Newmarket, Suffolk. Here they were joined by the East Norfolk detachment of the Supplementary Militia formed in 1796 and now called out to replace those militiamen who had volunteered for the Regulars.

Lord Wodehouse resigned the colonelcy of the regiment in 1798 and recommended his eldest son, Captain the Hon John Wodehouse, to the Home Secretary, the William Cavendish-Bentinck, 3rd Duke of Portland, to be his successor. Portland passed this recommendation to Townshend (now Lord Lieutenant of Norfolk) and the young man was accordingly commissioned as colonel on 14 July 1798.

In September 1798 the officers and most of the men of the East Norfolk Militia volunteered for service in Ireland during the 1798 Rebellion, but their offer was not accepted.

In October 1798 the regiment was at Ipswich, when it took part in a field day, and in October 1799 was distributed across Suffolk, with headquarters (HQ) at Beccles. In June 1800 it was ordered to march to Yorkshire, where it was stationed at Pontefract and Boroughbridge (3 companies), Doncaster (3) and Bawtry (2). By September 1800 it was at Sheffield, from where it went in November to winter quarters at Lichfield in Staffordshire. In May 1801 the regiment was at Derby, from where it moved to quarters in Manchester and Macclesfield. In September that year a preliminary peace treaty was agreed, and with the prospect of the militia being stood down the East Norfolks returned to East Anglia, being quartered in Colchester Barracks and later at Ipswich. After the signing of the Treaty of Amiens on 27 March 1802 the regiment marched to Yarmouth to be disembodied on 24 April.

=== Prisoner shooting ===
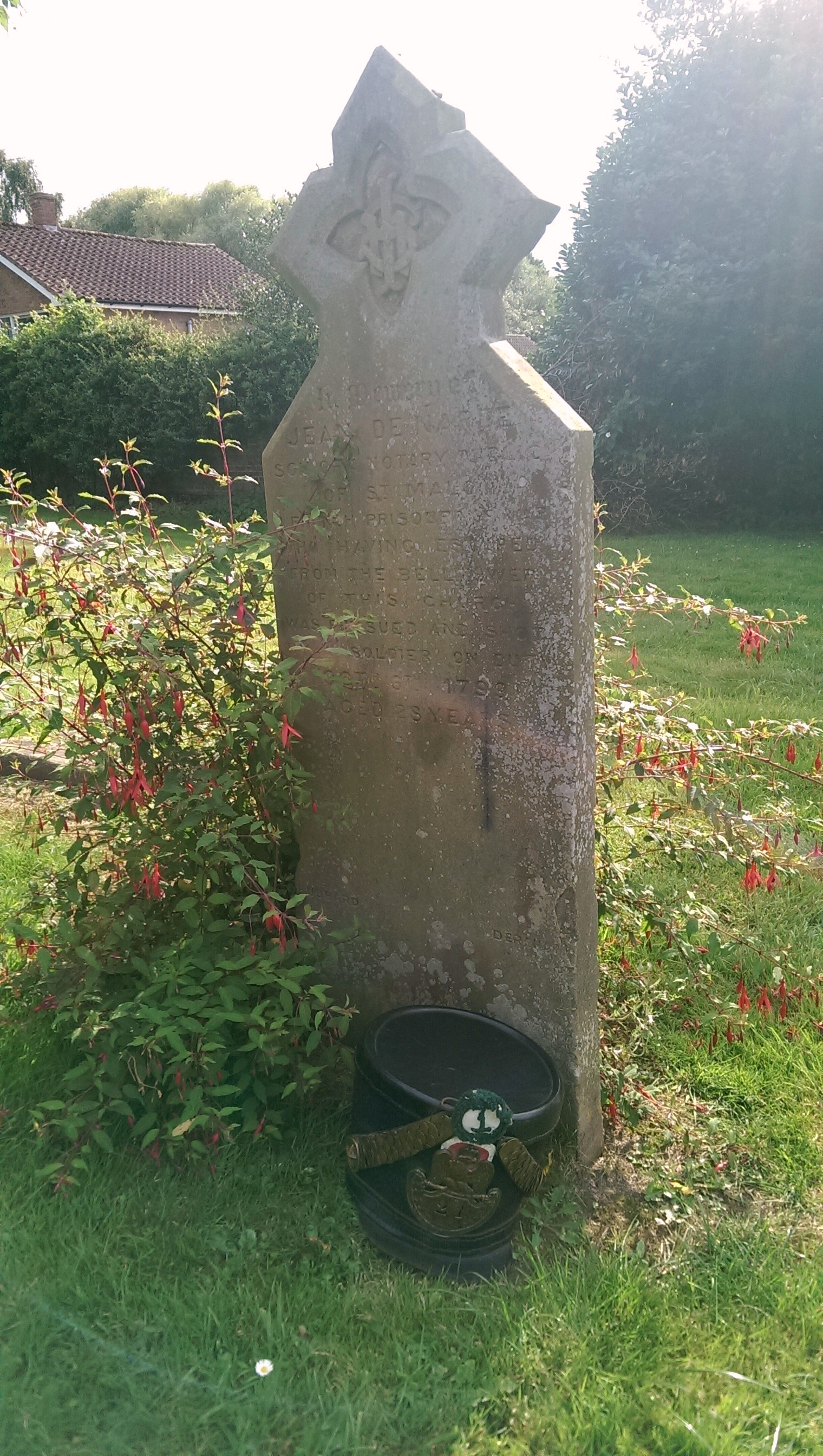
Jean De Narde's grave at Dereham

In 1799 the East Norfolk Militia was escorting French prisoners from Yarmouth to the Prisoner-of-war camp at Norman Cross. The bell tower of Dereham church was employed as a makeshift overnight cell for these prisoners. Jean De Narde, a 28-year lieutenant and son of a notary from St. Malo, escaped from the tower, but could not leave the churchyard due to posted sentries. Being unable to escape, De Narde chose to hide in a tree; but his absence was noted and he was soon discovered by a sergeant. De Narde ignored orders to surrender and the sergeant shot him dead. The local people of Dereham were ashamed of this killing and a monument was built by public subscription.

A memorial service for Jean De Narde was held at Dereham church on 23 July 2016, including a re-enactment of the shooting and a minute's silence. A short documentary on the subject of the shooting was released in 2017.

=== Napoleonic Wars ===
The Norfolk Militia training in front of tourists at Cromer

The Peace of Amiens was short-lived and Britain declared war on France once more on 18 May 1803, the East Norfolk Militia having already been re-embodied at Yarmouth on 21 March. In June it was distributed across Suffolk at Beccles (2 Companies), Bungay (1), Lowestoft (1), Halesworth and Blythburgh (2), and Saxmundham and Framlingham (2). In June 1804 the West and East Norfolks, with other militia regiments, were stationed at Colchester Barracks, using Lexden Heath for parades. On 25 July 1804 both regiments marched from Colchester and arrived at Coxheath Camp in Kent on 27 July after a rapid and fatiguing march. The East and West Norfolks with the Royal Buckinghamshire Militia formed Maj-Gen Baird's Brigade.

Large numbers of militia were recruited into the Regulars during 1805 (men from the East Norfolks mainly joined the new 96th Foot), and recourse was made to the ballot to make up the numbers, when large amounts were paid for substitutes, though the establishments of the Norfolk regiments were reduced to the numbers before the Supplementaries were added (98 NCOs and drummers, 786 privates).

During the invasion crisis of 1805, while Napoleon assembled an expeditionary force across the English Channel at Boulogne, the Norfolk Militia were stationed in the Southern District (Sussex), the most vulnerable sector. Together with the Nottinghamshire Militia the East and West Norfolks formed a brigade under Maj Gen Alexander Mackenzie Fraser, with headquarters in Winchelsea. On 1 September the East Norfolks had 698 men under Lt-Col Sir George Berney Brograve, 2nd Baronet, five companies with the West Norfolks at Clifford Camp, and the other five at Rye & Pleydon Barracks with the Nottinghamshires.

By November 1805 the East Norfolks were at Hastings Barracks, moving to Riding Street Barracks later that month. The following February the regiment was ordered to Chelmsford Barracks, moving to Colchester Barracks in May. On 10 October the garrison of Colchester was reviewed by the Duke of York, then the regiments marched out to winter quarters, the East Norfolks going to Ipswich. In August 1808 the regiment moved out of the old barracks in Ipswich to the newly built barracks on Woodbridge Road. In June 1809 it moved to Kent join the Chatham garrison; in 1810 it was at nearby Sheerness, and the following year at Ramsgate Barracks.

=== Ireland ===
The Interchange Act 1811 passed in July allowed English militia regiments to serve in Ireland once again, for a period of up to two years. The East Norfolks was one of the regiments that volunteered for this service, and in September the main body, 700 strong, marched to Bristol from where it sailed to Ireland and marched to Cahir. The rest of the regiment was at sea for over 10 weeks before it reached Cork on 26 November and was able to rejoin. The regiment shifted its quarters to Mallow in May 1812, and then to Limerick in January 1813. In June 1813 it was billeted across County Limerick and County Clare when it was relieved by the North Cork Militia and sailed back to England.

The regiment landed at Plymouth in late June and was quartered at Honiton where the following month it was joined by its depot detachment, which had remained at Sheerness during the Irish deployment, and by the regiment's recruits from Norwich. By December it was at Dartmouth, Devon. After Napoleon abdicated on 6 April 1814, the militia began to be stood down. The East Norfolks marched from Plymouth to Woodbridge in May, and then returned to Yarmouth, where it was disembodied at Yarmouth on 24 June 1814. It was not called out during the short Waterloo campaign in 1815.

=== Long peace ===
After Waterloo there was another long peace. The East Norfolk Militia was mustered at Yarmouth for training in 1820, 1821, 1825, 1826 and 1831, but not thereafter. Although officers continued to be commissioned into the militia, the permanent staffs of sergeants and drummers (who were occasionally used to maintain public order) were progressively reduced. John Wodehouse (2nd Lord Wodehouse from 1834) retained the colonelcy until 1843, when his younger son Major the Hon Berkeley Wodehouse, formerly of the 8th Hussars, took over the command.

== 1852 reforms ==
The Militia of the United Kingdom was revived by the Militia Act 1852, enacted during a renewed period of international tension. As before, units were raised and administered on a county basis, and filled by voluntary enlistment (although conscription by means of the Militia Ballot might be used if the counties failed to meet their quotas). Training was for 56 days on enlistment, then for 21–28 days per year, during which the men received full army pay. Under the Act, Militia units could be embodied by Royal Proclamation for full-time home defence service in three circumstances:

1. 'Whenever a state of war exists between Her Majesty and any foreign power'.
2. 'In all cases of invasion or upon imminent danger thereof'.
3. 'In all cases of rebellion or insurrection'.

The West and East Norfolk Militia were reformed in 1853, and a Norfolk Artillery Militia was also formed, partly by transfers from the two infantry regiments. The government's orders to build an armoury and quarters in Great Yarmouth for the permanent staff of the East Norfolk Militia and Norfolk Artillery Militia caused headaches for the Norfolk civil authorities. One suitable building was across the border in Suffolk, and the large barracks at Yarmouth was occupied by Royal Navy as a hospital. Eventually the hospital was converted into Gorleston Barracks for the artillery militia.

When the East Norfolk regiment was resuscitated the field officers (Col Berkeley Wodehouse, Lt-Col William Mason and Maj Sir Edmund Lacon, 3rd Baronet) and the adjutant continued in their posts, but a number of former Regular Army officers were appointed as company commanders, along with a roster of new junior officers. The East Norfolk Militia was called out for training under Lt-Col Mason on 25 April 1854. The regiment was presented with new colours on 16 May 1854 at a public ceremony held on South Denes, Great Yarmouth, attended by 10,000 persons, including civic dignitaries. The day concluded with a ball held at Great Yarmouth Town Hall, which had been decorated with the new colours, mirrors and stars formed of bayonets. These colours were still being carried in 1898. The regiment completed its training on 27 May and the men were sent home, though some had expected the regiment to be kept embodied in view of the outbreak of the Crimean War.

=== Crimean War ===
An expeditionary force having been sent to the Crimea, the militia began to be called out for home defence. All three Norfolk regiments were embodied on 27 December 1854. Because of the way the 1852 Act had been drafted, a number of men enlisted before April 1854 had to be released, reducing the effective strength of the regiments. However, an increased bounty induced many of them to re-enlist.

In February 1856, the East Norfolk Militia left Great Yarmouth by train, travelling to a hutted encampment at Colchester. At Colchester railway station they were met by the band of the Essex Rifle Militia. The strength at this time was recorded as 1 Major (Lacon), 13 officers, 3 staff sergeants and 415 men. On April 23 the units at Colchester, including the East Norfolk Militia, were reviewed by Prince Albert. The war had ended on 30 March with the Treaty of Paris and In June the warrant for disembodying the militia was issued. The East Norfolks returned to Great Yarmouth to be paid off. Unlike the West Norfolks, the regiment was not re-embodied during the Indian Mutiny. From 1857 the regiment was called out annually for training at Great Yarmouth.

Major Sir Edmund Lacon had been in effective command of the regiment during its embodiment. He was promoted to Lt-Col on 31 August 1859 and on 16 March 1860 he became Lt-Col Commandant, with Berkeley Wodehouse retiring to become the first Honorary Colonel. From 1864 Lacon was simultaneously Lt-Col Commandant of the 1st Norfolk Artillery Volunteers formed in 1859.

On 20 May 1861, the East Norfolk Militia were involved in a serious military riot at Yarmouth, against men of the Royal Artillery. It was reported in the Norfolk Chronicle that this riot included the use of belts and stones, and that 200 Artillerymen, armed with swords and knives issued from the arsenal, had to be prevented from joining the fight by "persuasion and threats". The report says that officers from both corps were involved in ending the riot, and that guards had to be placed on the bridge to keep the Artillery out of Yarmouth and the Militia from crossing into Southtown.

== Cardwell and Childers reforms ==
Under the Localisation of the Forces scheme introduced by the Cardwell Reforms of 1872, militia regiments were brigaded with their local Regular and Volunteer battalions. Sub-District No 31 (County of Norfolk) set up its depot at Gorleston Barracks at Great Yarmouth, the headquarters of the Norfolk Artillery Militia. It comprised:

- 1st and 2nd Battalions, 9th (Norfolk) Regiment of Foot
- West Norfolk Militia at Norwich
- East Norfolk Militia at Yarmouth
- 1st (City of Norwich) Norfolk Rifle Volunteer Corps
- 2nd (Great Yarmouth) Norfolk Rifle Volunteer Corps
- 3rd Norfolk Rifle Volunteer Corps at East Dereham
- 4th Norfolk Rifle Volunteer Corps at Norwich

Militia battalions now had a large cadre of permanent staff (about 30) and a number of the officers were former Regulars. Around a third of the recruits and many young officers went on to join the Regular Army. The Militia Reserve introduced in 1867 consisted of present and former militiamen who undertook to serve overseas in case of war. They were called out in 1878 during the international crisis caused by the Russo-Turkish War.

Following the Cardwell Reforms a mobilisation scheme began to appear in the Army List from December 1875. This assigned Regular and Militia units to places in an order of battle of corps, divisions and brigades for the 'Active Army', even though these formations were entirely theoretical, with no staff or services assigned. The West and East Norfolk Militia were both assigned to 1st Brigade of 2nd Division, VII Corps. The brigade would have mustered at Northampton in time of war.

=== 4th (2nd Norfolk Militia) Battalion, Norfolk Regiment ===
The Childers Reforms of 1881 completed the Cardwell process by converting the Regular regiments into county regiments and incorporating the militia battalions into them. The 9th Foot became the Norfolk Regiment with the following organisation:

- 1st and 2nd Battalions, Norfolk Regiment
- 3rd (1st Norfolk Militia) Battalion, Norfolk Regiment
- 4th (2nd Norfolk Militia) Battalion, Norfolk Regiment
- 1st–4th Volunteer Battalions, Norfolk Regiment

Britannia Barracks, which took its name from the regimental badge, was built between 1885 and 1887 on Mousehold Heath at the edge of Norwich as a depot for the whole of the Norfolk Regiment. In 1889 the annual training for the 4th Battalion was moved from Yarmouth to the new depot, and a "great number of men bought their discharge rather than train at Norwich". The following year the training was at a tented camp on Abbey Fields at Colchester, where a grand review was held for the Queen's birthday. In following years the battalion's training returned to Yarmouth, sometimes brigaded with the Norfolk Artillery Militia. The sequence was broken in 1898 when the 4th Norfolks returned to Abbey Fields, brigaded with the 3rd (West Suffolk Militia) Battalion, Suffolk Regiment and the 4th (Hertfordshire Militia) Battalion, Bedfordshire Regiment. 3rd and 4th Bns Norfolks, the Norfolk Artillery Militia, and the 3rd Suffolks were brigaded together at Yarmouth for annual training in 1899.

=== Second Boer War ===
With the bulk of the Regular Army serving in South Africa during the Second Boer War, the Militia were called out. The 4th Battalion was embodied on 1 May 1900 and disembodied on 17 July the following year. Although the 4th Bn Norfolks was not deployed overseas, 14 names of men from the battalion appear on the Boer War memorial to the militia and volunteer battalions of the Norfolks in Norwich Cathedral. These are likely to include Militia Reserve men serving with other units.

== Disbandment ==
After the Boer War, the future of the militia was called into question. There were moves to reform the Auxiliary Forces (Militia, Yeomanry and Volunteers) to take their place in the six Army Corps proposed by the Secretary of State for War, St John Brodrick. However, little of Brodrick's scheme was carried out. Under the more sweeping Haldane Reforms of 1908, the Militia was replaced by the Special Reserve (SR), a semi-professional force whose role was to provide reinforcement drafts for regular units serving overseas in wartime, rather like the earlier Militia Reserve. For the Norfolk Regiment this role was fulfilled by the 3rd Battalion, and the 4th Battalion was disbanded on 15 July 1908.

== Commanders ==
=== Colonels ===
The following served as Colonel of the Regiment:

- Sir Armine Wodehouse, 5th Baronet, from 1759
- John Wodehouse, 1st Baron Wodehouse, son of the above, promoted from Lt-Col 6 June 1774; resigned 1798.
- John Wodehouse, 2nd Baron Wodehouse, son of the above, promoted from Captain 14 July 1798.
- Hon Berkeley Wodehouse, son of the above, former Major, 8th Hussars, appointed 9 September 1842.

Following the 1852 reforms the rank of colonel was progressively abolished in the militia and the lieutenant-colonel became the commanding officer; at the same time, the position of Honorary Colonel was introduced.

=== Lieutenant-Colonels ===
Lieutenant-Colonels of the regiment (commanding officers from 1860) included the following:

- Lt-Col Henry William Wilson, from first formation
- Lt-Col John Wodehouse, appointed 19 May 1774, promoted to Col 6 June 1774
- Lt-Col Jacob Preston, appointed 6 June 1774
- Lt-Col the Hon Horatio Walpole by 1780, promoted to Colonel, West Norfolk Militia 19 March 1792
- Lt. Col Richard Ward promoted 19 March 1792
- Lt-Col Edmund Mapes promoted 19 June 1799
- Lt-Col Charles Lucas appointed 17 February 1804, resigned 1805
- Lt-Col Sir George Berney Brograve, 2nd Baronet, promoted 7 May 1805, resigned May 1806
- Lt-Col John Staniforth Patteson, promoted 19 May 1806, resigned April 1808
- Lt-Col William Durrant promoted 27 April 1808.
- Lt-Col William Mason promoted 6 May 1824
- Lt-Col Sir Edmund Lacon, 3rd Baronet promoted 31 August 1859, became Lt-Col Commandant 16 March 1860; Hon Col of the regiment 1881
- Lt-Col Cmndt Henry Mathew, promoted 18 April 1881
- Lt-Col Charles Applewhaite, promoted 19 May 1886
- Lt-Col Thomas William Haines, promoted 24 April 1888
- Lt-Col Sir Charles Harvey, 2nd Baronet, promoted 11 December 1895
- Lt-Col Edmund Kerrison, CMG, retired from the Royal Artillery, appointed 3 February 1900
- Lt-Col William Danby, former Major, 7th Dragoon Guards, promoted 3 February 1905

=== Honorary Colonels ===
The following served as Honorary Colonel of the regiment:

- Col Hon Berkeley Wodehouse, former CO, appointed 16 March 1860, died 13 September 1877
- Col Sir Edmund Lacon, 3rd Baronet, appointed 9 April 1881; also appointed Hon Col of the 1st Norfolk Artillery Volunteers on 31 December 1881; died 2 December 1888.
- Lt-Col Arnold Keppel, 8th Earl of Albemarle, GCVO, CB, VD, TD, appointed 26 September 1900

=== Other notable members ===
- Maj-Gen George Stracey Smyth, appointed ensign in the East Norfolk Militia on 20 May 1779 at the age of 12, transferred to the Regular Army the following year; later Lieutenant Governor of New Brunswick.
- Sir Edmund Lacon, 2nd Baronet, father of the later Hon Col, commissioned as major 29 June 1824 (the same day that his son was commissioned as captain in the regiment).
- Sir Edmund B.K. Lacon, 4th Baronet, son of the Hon Col, former lieutenant in the Royal Welch Fusiliers, commissioned as captain 12 June 1867, promoted major 16 April 1881.
- Maj the Hon St Leger Vincent, DSO, retired Major, King's Royal Rifle Corps, appointed 12 October 1904; transferred to the 3rd (Reserve) Bn (former West Norfolk Militia) on disbandment of 4th Bn; commanded a battalion of the Manchester Regiment during World War I.

== Heritage and ceremonial ==
=== Uniforms and insignia ===
When the Norfolk Militia paraded at Kensington Palace in 1759 the uniform was red with black facings. The East Norfolks retained these facings until at least 1850, but changed to white before 1855. In 1881 the East Norfolks adopted the uniform of the Norfolk Regiment, which in that year was obliged to adopt white facings as an English line regiment. The only militia distinction worn on the Norfolks' uniform was the letter "M" on the shoulder strap.

The badge of the Norfolk Militia regiments was the Coat of arms of the City of Norwich, with a castle above a lion of England. The other ranks' Forage cap badge 1874–81 was the Royal crest above a scroll inscribed EAST NORFOLK. In 1881 all ranks adopted the Britannia badge of the Norfolk Regiment, but the officers of all the battalions of the Norfolk Regiment wore the castle on their waistbelt plate.

An East Norfolk Militia button believed to date from 1770 to 1780 has "E" over NORFOLK over "B" (for Battalion). A button from ca 1780–1800 has an ornate 'EN' within an eight-pointed cut star. The officers' buttons until 1881 carried the castle and lion within a crowned garter inscribed EAST NORFOLK.

In about 1800 the officers' shoulder-belt plate was oval with the castle and lion on a shield. About 1845–55 it had a cut star with St George's Cross in the centre, all within a crowned garter below a scroll inscribed EAST NORFOLK.

=== Precedence ===
In the Seven Years' War militia regiments camped together took precedence according to the order in which they had arrived. During the War of American Independence the counties were given an order of precedence determined by ballot each year. For the Norfolk Militia the positions were:

- 28th on 1 June 1778
- 34th on12 May 1779
- 9th on 6 May 1780
- 7th on 28 April 1781
- 33rd on 7 May 1782

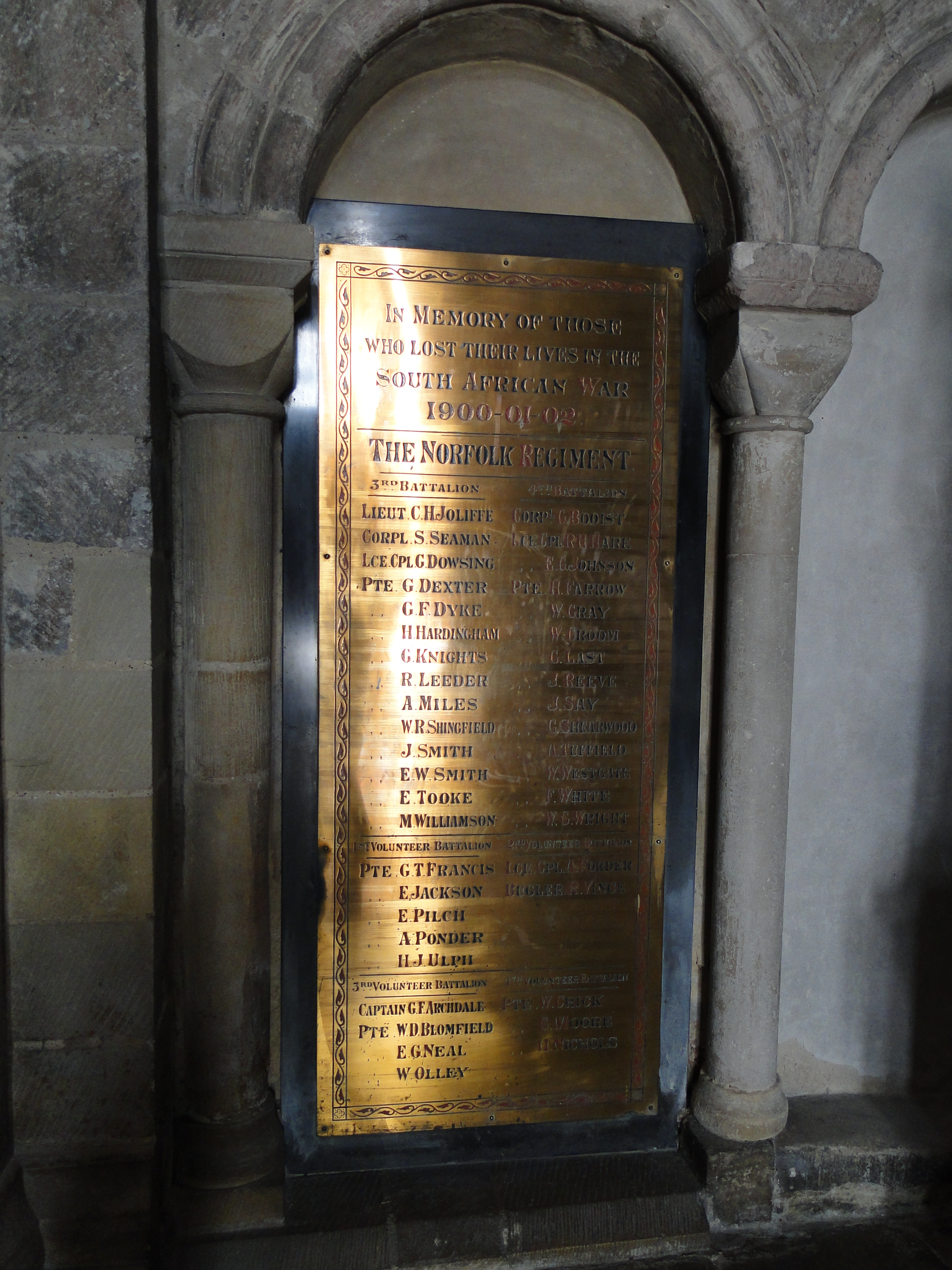
Boer War Memorial in Norwich Cathedral to the militia and volunteer battalions of the Norfolk Regiment.

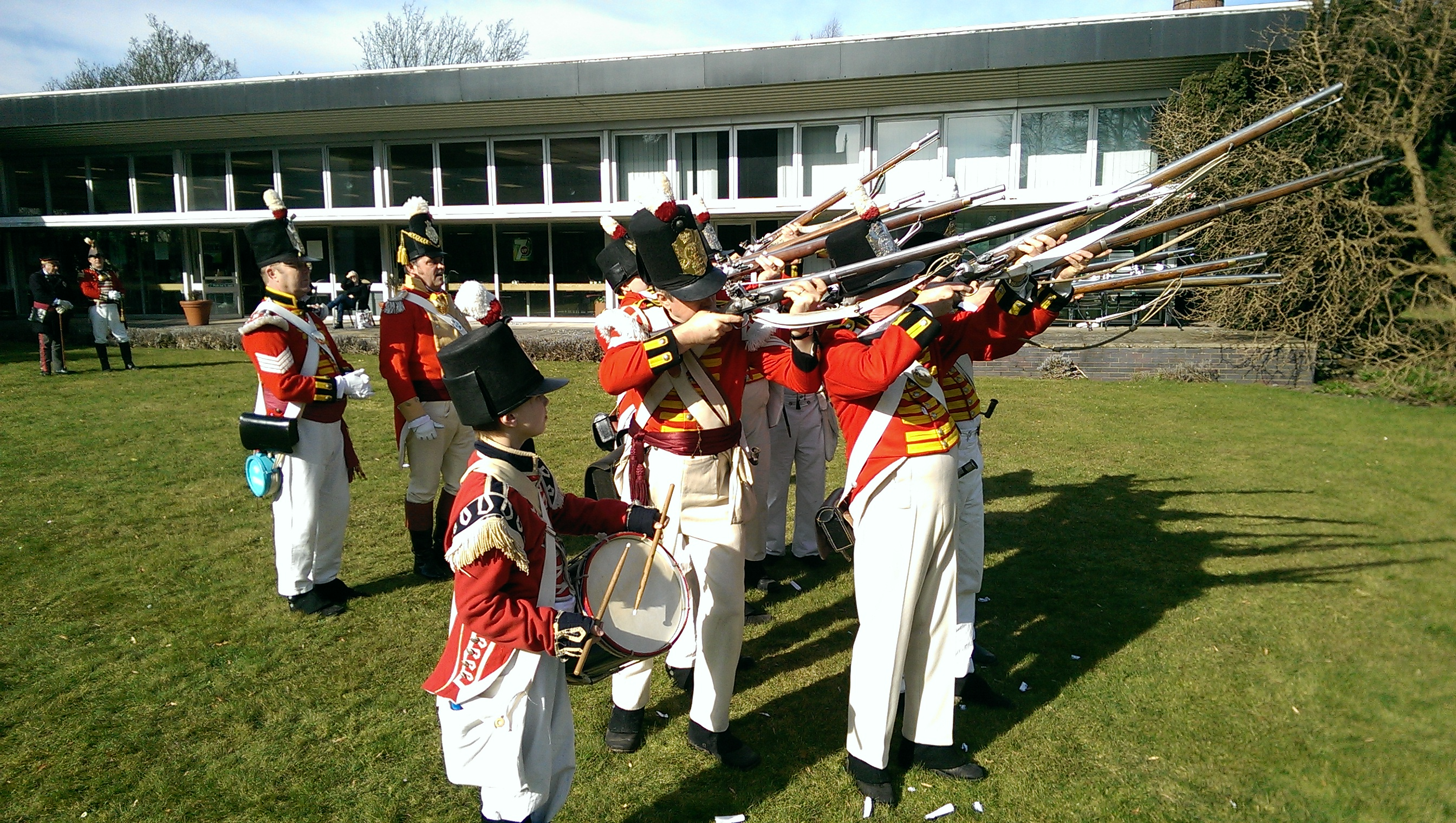
Re-enactors wearing the later (pre-Waterloo) pattern uniform of the East Norfolk Militia.

The militia order of precedence balloted for in 1793 (Norfolk was 4th) remained in force throughout the French Revolutionary War: this still covered all the regiments in the county. Another ballot for precedence took place at the start of the Napoleonic War, when Norfolk was 46th.This order continued until 1833. In that year the King drew the lots for individual regiments and the resulting list remained in force with minor amendments until the end of the militia. The regiments raised before the peace of 1763 took the first 47 places: the West Norfolk was 39th and the East Norfolk was 40th, although most regiments paid little notice to the additional number.

=== Memorials ===
The names of the officers and men of militia and volunteer battalions of the Norfolk Regiment who died during the Second Boer War are engraved on a brass plate in Norwich Cathedral.

== East Norfolk Militia (re-enactment group) ==
The East Norfolk Militia is a Napoleonic era re-enactment group, formed in 2000 to help celebrate the bicentenary of Horatio Nelson, 1st Viscount Nelson being awarded the Freedom of the borough of Great Yarmouth.

== See also ==
- Militia (Great Britain)
- Militia (United Kingdom)
- Norfolk Militia
- West Norfolk Militia
- Norfolk Artillery Militia
- Royal Norfolk Regiment
- East Norfolk Militia re-enactment group
