= Norfolk Artillery =

Norfolk Artillery may refer to:

- Norfolk Artillery Militia – a unit of the Militia (United Kingdom)
- 1st Norfolk Artillery Volunteers – a unit of the British Volunteer Force
