= John Penrice =

Major John Penrice (Great Yarmouth, 5 December 1818 – 1892) was a British soldier, photographer, and the author of an English glossary of the Quran (1873) based on the edition of Gustav Leberecht Flügel (1834).

== Biography ==
His father John Penrice Sr. (1787–1844) was a captain in the King's 15th Hussars. He had young brothers and sisters including, Thomas Penrice of Kilvrough (b. 1820), Captain Herbert Newton Penrice of the Royal Engineers whose tunnelling machine was used during the Crimean War. and Rev. Charles Berners Penrice.

A captain, then major (1855) in the Norfolk Artillery Militia, Penrice exhibited calotypes and waxed-paper architectural and landscape views in the 1854 and 1855 Photographic Society exhibitions in London and in the 1855 London Photographic Institution exhibition. His work after that was in collodion. It is said, he had "a complex character, Penrice eventually became a justice of the peace in Norfolk. In 1844, on the death of his father, he sent twenty-five major paintings from Wilton House, the family home near Yarmouth in Norfolk, to Messrs Christie and Manson. Some of these are in the National Gallery, London, and The Metropolitan Museum of Art, New York. In 1861 he published The Valley of the Nile, a series of one hundred stereoscopic views taken in Egypt and Nubia. Although Penrice’s photographs are now virtually unknown, his Dictionary and Glossary of the Koran first published in 1873 is a substantial piece of scholarship". Penrice served in Egypt and Nubia with British troops, his Dictionary and Glossary of the Koran is supposed to be an authoritative work of its kind. In the past 150 years multiple editions of the lexicon have been published.
