= Sir Kenneth Hagar Kemp, 12th Baronet =

English baronet, lawyer, soldier, banker, landowner, and cricketer

Sir Kenneth Hagar Kemp CBE (21 April 1853 – 22 April 1936) was an English baronet, lawyer, soldier, banker and landowner who also played first-class cricket for the Marylebone Cricket Club (MCC) and Cambridge University in a few matches in the 1870s. He was born at Erpingham, Norfolk and died at Sheringham, also in Norfolk.

== Family background ==
Kemp was the son of Nunn Robert Pretyman Kemp, a Norfolk clergyman; he owed his middle name to his mother, who had been a Miss Hagar. His father died when he was six years old, and Kemp was then educated at the Clergy Orphan School in Canterbury, followed by Jesus College, Cambridge. In 1874, following the deaths of two elderly and childless cousins (and the death the previous year of his own elder brother), he inherited the Kemp baronetcy which dated from 1642 and which brought him ownership of Gissing Hall in Norfolk and substantial landholdings.

== Cricket career ==
Kemp appeared in four first-class matches. He played once for MCC in 1872 and then in three games while he was at Cambridge University in 1873, though in only one of the three did he appear for the university side – he played against the university for an MCC team and a side that was called "An England XI". He was a middle- or lower-middle-order batsman and for the "England" team he bowled three overs without taking a wicket; his highest score was also in that game with an innings of 41.

Though Kemp's senior cricket ended in 1873, he continued to play in non-first-class MCC matches for the next decade and more, and also appeared in non-first-class games for the Norfolk county side which was founded in 1876.

== Career outside cricket ==
Following graduation from Cambridge University in 1875, Kemp had a varied career. He joined the part-time West Norfolk Militia as a supernumerary Second lieutenant on 10 January 1877 while he trained as a lawyer, being called to the bar in 1880. He was also a partner in the Norfolk bank, Lacon Youell & Kemp, and in the 1895 general election and the 1899 by-election he stood for the Conservatives in the North Norfolk constituency, unsuccessfully.

Kemp's parallel legal and militia careers lasted for many years. As a lawyer, he was the author of a book on the Law of Allotments and practised as a barrister on the South-East Circuit. Meanwhile, he steadily progressed through the West Norfolk Militia (which became the 3rd (1st Norfolk Militia) Battalion, Norfolk Regiment, in 1881): Captain, 7 March 1883, Major 28 March 1894, and Lieutenant-Colonel commanding the battalion 15 October 1904. He served in South Africa during the Second Boer War. He retired from the militia (by then the Special Reserve) in 1910 with the honorary rank of Colonel, but returned to duty on the outbreak of World War I, commanding the 2nd (Home Service) Garrison Battalion, Suffolk Regiment in 1916, and then returning to his former command, 3rd Battalion Norfolk Regiment, until July 1917. At the end of the war he was appointed Commander of the Order of the British Empire "for valuable services rendered in connection with the War".

== Family ==
Kemp married Henrietta Hamilton in 1876; they had one son, Richard Hamilton Kemp, and four daughters. Richard Kemp predeceased his father and left two daughters of his own, so the baronetcy became extinct on Kenneth Kemp's death in 1936.

Baronetage of England
Preceded by Thomas Kemp	Baronet (of Gissing); 1874–1936	Extinct
