= VII Corps (United Kingdom) =

Corps of the British Army

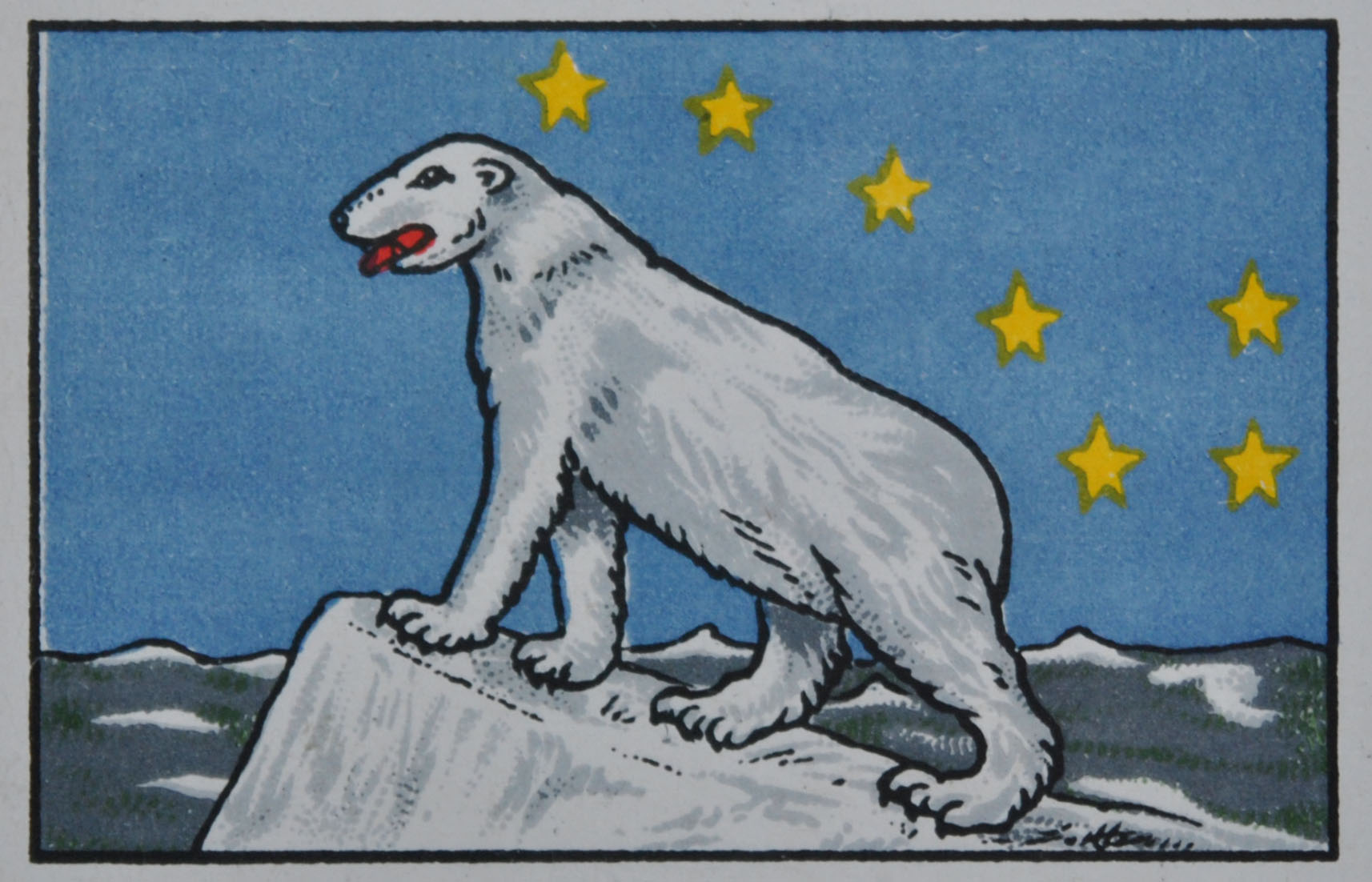
- VII Corps formation badge during the First World War
- Active: First World War; Second World War
- Country: United Kingdom
- Branch: British Army
- Type: Field corps
- Part of: British Expeditionary Force (1915-18); GHQ Home Forces (1940, 1944-45)
- Engagements: Battle of the Somme; German Retreat to the Hindenburg Line; Battle of Arras; Battle of Cambrai; Battle of the Somme (1918)

Commanders
- Notable commanders: Lt-Gen Sir Thomas D'Oyly Snow KCB KCMG; Lt-Gen Sir Walter Congreve VC KCB MVO

The VII Corps was an army corps of the British Army active in the First and Second World Wars. In the early part of the Second World War, it was part of the defence forces of the United Kingdom, and later acted as a shadow formation for deception purposes.

== Prior to the First World War ==
In 1876, a Mobilisation Scheme was published for the forces in Great Britain and Ireland, including eight army corps of the 'Active Army'. The '7th Corps' was to be headquartered at York, formed from Irish and English militia. In 1880, its order of battle was as follows:

- 1st Division (York)
  - 1st Brigade (York)
    - 5th West York Militia (Knaresborough), 6th West York Militia (Halifax), Leicestershire Militia (Leicester)
  - 2nd Brigade (York)
    - North Down Militia (Newtownards), South Down Militia (Downpatrick), Dublin County Militia (Dublin)
  - Divisional Troops
    - 106th Foot (Preston), Yorkshire Yeomanry (York)
  - Artillery
    - N/2nd Brigade Royal Artillery (Coventry)
- 2nd Division (Northampton)
  - 1st Brigade (Northampton)
    - 1st & 2nd Northampton and Rutland Militia (Northampton), 1st Norfolk Militia (Norwich), 2nd Norfolk Militia (Yarmouth)
  - 2nd Brigade (Northampton)
    - Cambridge Militia (Ely), West Suffolk Militia (Bury St Edmunds), West Essex Militia (Chelmsford)
  - Divisional Troops
    - 76th Foot (Sheffield), Southern Nottinghamshire Yeomanry (Nottingham), Nottinghamshire Yeomanry (Worksop)
- 3rd Division (Darlington)
  - 1st Brigade (Darlington)
    - North Lincoln Militia (Lincoln), South Lincoln Militia (Grantham), Nottinghamshire Militia (Newark)
  - 2nd Brigade (Newcastle)
    - Hertfordshire Militia (Hertford), Bedfordshire Militia (Bedford), Huntingdonshire Militia (Huntingdon)
  - Divisional Troops
    - 36th Foot (Fleetwood), 2nd West York Yeomanry (Halifax)
- Cavalry Brigade (Doncaster)
  - 6th Dragoons (Edinburgh), 21st Hussars (Leeds), 4th Dragoon Guards (York), 1st West York Yeomanry (Doncaster)

This scheme had been dropped by 1881.

== First World War ==
VII Corps formed in France on 14 July 1915 under the command of Lt-General Thomas D'Oyly Snow (previously commander of 27th Division) as part of Sir Charles Monro's Third Army on the Western Front.

Order of Battle of VII Corps 14 July 1915
General Officer Commanding (GOC): Lt-Gen Sir Thomas D'O. Snow

- 4th Division
- 37th Division
- 48th (South Midland) Division

=== 1916 ===
In 1916 VII Corps remained in Third Army, now commanded by Sir Edmund Allenby. The Corps' first serious action was in the Somme Offensive of 1916, on the first day of which it carried out a disastrous diversionary attack at Gommecourt, in which 46th Division suffered 2455 casualties, and 56th Division 4313, for no permanent gain.

Order of Battle of VII Corps 1 July 1916
GOC: Lt-Gen Sir Thomas D'O. Snow
GOC, Royal Artillery: Brig-Gen C.M. Ross-Johnson
GOC, Heavy Artillery: Brig-Gen C.R. Buckle
Chief Engineer: Brig-Gen J.A. Tanner

- 46th (North Midland) Division
- 56th (1/1st London) Division
- 37th Division (in reserve)

From 10 May 1916 to 16 July 1917, 1st North Irish Horse constituted VII Corps Cavalry Regiment.

=== 1917 ===
When the German Army retreated to the Hindenburg Line in March 1917, VII Corps was the only part of Third Army required to follow up, south of the new line's pivot at Vimy Ridge.

Order of Battle of VII Corps 14 March-5 April 1917

- 14th (Light) Division
- 21st Division
- 39th Division
- 56th (1/1st London) Division

During the Arras Offensive of April and May 1917, VII Corps was engaged in all three Battles of the Scarpe. During the First Battle of the Scarpe, 9–14 April, it had the same divisions under command, with the addition of 50th (Northumbrian) Division, which captured the Wancourt Ridge. VII Corps then had 30th, 50th and 33rd Division engaged in the Second Battle of the Scarpe, 23–24 April. During the Third Battle of the Scarpe, 3–4 May, it operated with 14th (Light), 14th (Eastern) and 21st Divisions. Finally, for the subsequent actions on the Hindenburg Line, 20 May-16 June, VII Corps had 21st and 33rd Divisions under command.

Later in 1917, the corps fought in the Battle of Cambrai.

=== 1918 ===
In 1918 the command was taken over by Lt-Gen Sir Walter Congreve, VC, KCB, MVO. and the corps fought during Operation Michael and the subsequent victorious British advance of the Hundred Days Offensive that ended the war.

Order of Battle of VII Corps 21 March-23 March 1918

9th Division 16th Division 21st Division 39th Division

Order of Battle of VII Corps 24 March-26 March 1918

9th Division 16th Division 21st Division 35th Division 39th Division 1st Cavalry Division

Order of Battle of VII Corps 27 March-29 March 1918

9th Division 21st Division 35th Division 1st Cavalry Division

Order of Battle of VII Corps 28 March-5 April 1918

9th Division 21st Division 35th Division 1st Cavalry Division 4th Australian Division

== Second World War ==
VII Corps was reformed in the United Kingdom during mid-1940 to control field forces deployed to counter the German invasion threat of that year. On 17 July, that year it comprised 1st Canadian Infantry Division, 1st Armoured Division, and 2nd New Zealand Expeditionary Force (UK), a somewhat oversized brigade based on the second NZ echelon of troops (of the 2nd New Zealand Expeditionary Force) which had been diverted to the United Kingdom from Egypt. The Corps was placed under the command of Lieutenant-General Andrew McNaughton, a Canadian Army officer. At the time its allotted task was to 'counter-attack and destroy any enemy force invading the counties of Surrey, Kent, Sussex and Hampshire which was not destroyed by the troops of the Eastern and Southern Commands'.

The Official History of New Zealand in the Second World War 1939–45 writes:

The rest of the echelon spent their time training for their role in the defence of Britain. General Freyberg had given the officers an inspiring survey of the military situation; the press and Mr Churchill warned everyone that each weekend was a potential crisis. And history seemed to be repeating itself with some romantic variations. On 6 July the battalions were inspected by King George VI, and men with imagination and some slight knowledge of history thought of Elizabeth I at Tilbury or of George III reviewing his regiments when they were waiting for the forces of Napoleon.

At this stage the battalions and detachments of reinforcements with the Second Echelon had been organised into 2 NZEF (UK), with a Force Headquarters and three groups. Headquarters Covering Force (Brigadier Miles) had C Squadron of the Divisional Cavalry Regiment, a machine-gun company and an infantry battalion commanded by Lieutenant-Colonel Fraser and made up of the men from the two batteries of 5 Field Regiment and the two batteries of 7 Anti-Tank Regiment that were still without guns. The Mixed Brigade (Brigadier Barrowclough) was formed from 28 (Maori) Battalion and 29 (or Composite) Battalion (Lieutenant-Colonel McNaught) organised from the unattached infantry reinforcements. The third group was 5 Infantry Brigade (Brigadier Hargest). Fourth Anti-Tank Company was attached to the Mixed Infantry Brigade and 5 Anti-Tank Company to 5 Infantry Brigade.

There was still an acute shortage of arms, vehicles and equipment. Fifth Field Regiment had only one battery: a collection of 18-pounder guns and 4.5-inch (110 mm) howitzers. The anti-tank companies had been given the Bedford 30-cwt trucks, sheeted with 5/8-inch (16 mm) steel plate and equipped with Bren guns and anti-tank rifles. C Squadron Divisional Cavalry had six light tanks and six Bren carriers. The Army Service Corps details, men from the Petrol and Ammunition Companies, had motor lorries, but for the transportation of troops 8 and 9 Motor Coach Companies had been attached from the Royal Army Service Corps. With their enormous camouflaged buses they could lift the whole force in one move.

On 25 December 1940 VII Corps was renamed the Canadian Corps at a time when the threat of German invasion had somewhat dissipated and as the growing number of Canadian troops in the United Kingdom made the formation of a larger Canadian formation advisable. It was based at Headley Court in Surrey.

Later in the war it was notionally reactivated for deception purposes as a formation of the British Fourth Army as part of Operation Fortitude North, the threat to invade Norway at the time of the Normandy landings, with headquarters at Dundee. It was composed of the genuine British 52nd Infantry Division at Dundee, the notional U.S. 55th Division in Iceland, a Norwegian brigade, and three notional U.S. Army Ranger battalions in Iceland, plus corps troops. It moved south with Fourth Army for Fortitude South II, the continuation of the threat to the Pas de Calais, with headquarters at Folkestone in Kent and consisting of the British 61st and 80th divisions and 5th Armoured Division, the latter two notional and the 61st a genuine but low-establishment formation. It notionally moved to East Anglia in September, to Yorkshire in December, and was notionally disbanded in January 1945. Its insignia was a scallop shell on a blue ground.

== General Officers Commanding ==
Commanders included:

- 15 Jul 1915 – 3 Jan 1918 Lieutenant-General Sir Thomas Snow
- 3 Jan – 13 Apr 1918 Lieutenant-General Sir Walter Congreve
- 13 Apr – 19 Jun 1918 Major-General Sir Robert Whigham
- Jul–Dec 1940 Lieutenant-General Andrew McNaughton
