= Norfolk Artillery Militia =

Auxiliary unit of the British Army

Norfolk Artillery Militia PoW Own Norfolk Artillery (Eastern Division) RA Prince of Wales's Own Norfolk RGA (M)
- Active: 2 May 1853–March 1909
- Country: United Kingdom
- Branch: Militia
- Role: Garrison Artillery
- Part of: Eastern Division, RA
- Garrison/HQ: Great Yarmouth
- Engagements: Second Boer War

Commanders
- Colonel of the Regiment: King Edward VII
- Notable commanders: Jacob, Lord Hastings; Charles, Lord Suffield; Thomas, Viscount Coke,

The Prince of Wales's Own Norfolk Artillery was a part-time auxiliary unit of Britain's Royal Artillery in the County of Norfolk from 1853 to 1909. Its role was to serve in home defence in time of war, but it also provided an active service company in the Second Boer War. Under the patronage of Edward, Prince of Wales, it became a socially exclusive regiment.

== Background ==
The long-standing national Militia of the United Kingdom was revived by the Militia Act 1852 (15 & 16 Vict. c. 50), enacted during a period of international tension. As before, units were raised and administered on a county basis, and filled by voluntary enlistment (although conscription by means of the Militia Ballot might be used if the counties failed to meet their quotas). Training was for 56 days on enlistment, then for 21–28 days per year, during which the men received full army pay. Under the Act, Militia units could be embodied by Royal Proclamation for full-time home defence service in three circumstances:

1. 'Whenever a state of war exists between Her Majesty and any foreign power'.
2. 'In all cases of invasion or upon imminent danger thereof'.
3. 'In all cases of rebellion or insurrection'.

The 1852 Act introduced Artillery Militia units in addition to the traditional infantry regiments. Their role was to man coastal defences and fortifications, relieving the Royal Artillery (RA) for active service.

== History ==
The Norfolk Artillery Militia was formed under a Royal Warrant dated 2 May 1853 and comprised two companies with a total establishment of 183 all ranks. Detachments of men were transferred from the West Norfolk and East Norfolk Militia (52 from the latter) and the remainder were new recruits. The first Captain Commandant was Jacob Astley, 17th Lord Hastings, formerly of the Life Guards, with his uncle, Francis L'Estrange Astley, as Second Captain.

Headquarters was established at Great Yarmouth, where it took over the old Southtown Naval Barracks in 1855 after a long dispute between the County of Norfolk, the War Office and the Admiralty. This was renamed Gorleston Barracks. (Note: The Old Militia Barracks on All Saints Green in Norwich has apparently been misidentified as the barracks of the Norfolk Artillery Militia. However, this corps was always based at Great Yarmouth, and the All Saints Green site was in fact used by batteries of the 1st Norfolk Artillery Volunteers, later 1st East Anglian Brigade, Royal Field Artillery.)

=== Crimean War & Indian Mutiny ===
An expeditionary force of the Regular Army having been sent to the Crimean War in 1854, militia units were embodied for full-time service to man the home defences. The new Norfolk Artillery Militia was mustered on 27 December 1854 and embodied from 25 January 1855. In early March it went by train to Eastbourne, Sussex, where it served returning to Yarmouth in April 1855, where it served until it was disembodied on 15 June 1856. At the end of the embodiment the corps was increased from two to four companies, with an established strength of 451 all ranks, and a band was formed.

With the expansion of the corps, Francis Astley was appointed Lieutenant-Colonel Commandant on 1 June 1855, and Lord Hastings became its first Honorary Colonel on 24 May 1856.

The unit was embodied again on 5 April 1859 while the bulk of the Regular Army was fighting in the Indian Mutiny. It was sent to serve in the defences at Sheerness in Kent. In May 1859 during this period of embodiment the corps was increased again, from four to six companies. During April 1860 the corps moved to Woolwich, where it served until it was disembodied on 18 August that year.

On 9 May 1866 Charles, 5th Lord Suffield, was appointed Lt-Col Cmdt of the Norfolk Artillery Militia. He had served in the 7th Hussars and two of his younger brothers were already officers in the corps. He was a friend of Edward, Prince of Wales, and several of the Prince's connections subsequently served in the corps.

The Militia Reserve introduced in 1867 consisted of present and former militiamen who undertook to serve overseas in case of war. From the Norfolk Artillery Militia 114 qualified men (25 per cent of its strength) volunteered and were accepted.

=== Prince of Wales's Own ===
Period print of the Prince of Wales reviewing the Norfolk Artillery Militia at Great Yarmouth, June 1872.

Period print of the Prince of Wales attending a Mess Dinner at the Yarmouth New Assembly Rooms.

In May 1872 the Prince of Wales was appointed Honorary Colonel of the corps in succession to Lord Hastings, who had died the previous year. In September 1875 the corps applied for royal permission to change its title to the Prince of Wales's Own Norfolk Artillery Militia and to wear the Prince of Wales's feathers as a collar badge. The change of title was granted in November that year, but the badge appears never to have been granted, though the regiment did incorporate the PoW feathers into a crest used on letterheads etc.

The Artillery Militia was reorganised into 11 divisions of garrison artillery in 1882, and the Norfolk unit was assigned to the Eastern Division, becoming the Prince of Wales's Own 2nd Brigade, Eastern Division, Royal Artillery on 1 April. The title was altered on 1 July 1889 to Prince of Wales's Own Norfolk Artillery (Eastern Division RA).

The Great Yarmouth Assembly Rooms were frequently used as the Officer's Mess whilst artillery practice was conducted on South Denes. In 1883 Lt-Col Lord Suffield and Maj Edward Southwold Trafford purchased the building on behalf of the corps, and the building remained under militia ownership until 1918 (after which it became a Masonic Lodge).

In 1889 the PoW Own Norfolk Artillery was brigaded with the 3rd and 4th Battalions, Norfolk Regiment, (formerly the West and East Norfolk Militia) and the 3rd (West Suffolk Militia) Battalion, Suffolk Regiment at Great Yarmouth for annual training in 1889. On 23 April that year No 1 Battery of the corps had provided a guard of honour when Queen Victoria visited the Prince of Wales at Sandringham House. In commemoration of this, No 1 Battery was designated 'The Queen's Battery' on 9 May 1890 by Her Majesty's special command.

Colonel Viscount Coke, retired from the Scots Guards, was appointed Lt-Col Commandant of the PoW Own Norfolk Artillery on 21 February 1894.

=== Second Boer War ===
The PoW Own Norfolk Artillery was embodied for permanent service on 2 May 1900 during the Second Boer War, the militia reserve having already been called up. It was one of seven Militia artillery units to volunteer for overseas service, and formed a Special Service Company of 5 officers and 134 other ranks (ORs) under the command of Col Viscount Coke.

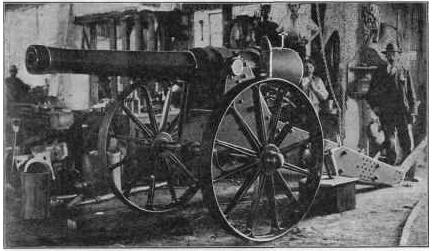
'Long Cecil' in the De Beers' workshop.

The company arrived at Cape Town on 27 May 1900 and proceeded to Kimberley. The headquarters and most of the company then moved on to the Orange River, leaving Capt C.H. Walter and a detachment of 35 ORs at Beaconsfield Camp, Kimberley. This detachment took over the famous Long Cecil gun, which had been built in the workshops of the De Beers diamond mine during the recently ended Siege of Kimberley. Two non-commissioned officers (NCOs) and six gunners were detached from here to man the two quick-firing (QF) guns on the armoured trains Wasp and Challenger.

The rest of the company at Orange River occupied Fort Antrim, with Capt F.A. Twiss and 20 ORs taking up a position with QF guns on the north bank. Eight NCOs and men did duty on the armoured trains Bulldog and Blackhatla. Meanwhile 40 NCOs and men were trained as Mounted infantry (MI) following the success of the Royal Artillery Mounted Rifles formed from Regular gunners who otherwise had little role in anti-guerrilla operations. The company returned to Kimberley on 31 January 1901 and sent detachments to man 15-pounder breechloading (BL) field guns in defences at Koffyfontein, Christiana and Boshof (Lt Hon Bertram Gurdon with two guns). Lieutenant L.G. Buxton with 15 ORs manned a 15-pdr Elswick gun which formed part of the escort for convoys to and from Boshof, and on one occasion it helped to drive off an attack by Jacob's Commando on the convoy. The men also acted as escort for the Royal Engineers building the blockhouse line from Kimberley to Boshof.

After peace was declared in May 1902, the company left Cape Town aboard the RMS Walmer Castle in late June and arrived at Southampton the following month. The men who served with the Special Service Company received the Queen's South Africa Medal with clasps for 'Transvaal', 'Orange River', 'Cape Colony', 'South Africa 1901' and 'South Africa 1902'. Two men had died on service, one from disease, the other from an accident. The rest of the PoW Norfolk Artillery in the UK had been disembodied on 13 October 1900.

From 1902 most units of the Militia artillery formally became part of the Royal Garrison Artillery (RGA), the Norfolk unit taking the title of Prince of Wales's Own Norfolk RGA (M). Sir Savile Crossley, 2nd Baronet, (later created Lord Somerleyton), who first been commissioned as lieutenant on 1 July 1881, granted the honorary rank of major on 17 April 1895 and lt-col on 15 June 1901, became commanding officer on 11 August 1906. (Note: Crossley served with the Imperial Yeomanry during the Boer War, and with the Suffolk Yeomanry during World War I.)

== Disbandment ==
After the Boer War, the future of the Militia was called into question. There were moves to reform the Auxiliary Forces (Militia, Yeomanry and Volunteers) to take their place in the six Army Corps proposed by St John Brodrick as Secretary of State for War. One of the problems with the militia artillery was that their war stations were distant from their recruiting areas. As a result, some batteries of Militia Artillery were to be converted to field artillery. However, little of Brodrick's scheme was carried out.

Under the sweeping Haldane Reforms of 1908, the Militia was replaced by the Special Reserve (SR), a semi-professional force whose role was to provide reinforcement drafts for Regular units serving overseas in wartime. The plan was to convert the RGA (M) into SR units of the Royal Field Artillery. The Commanding Officer appealed to the War Office that the Norfolk unit should remain part of the RGA, but was overruled. Although the majority of the officers and men accepted transfer to the PoW Own Norfolk Royal Field Reserve Artillery on 28 April 1908, all these units were disbanded in March 1909. Instead the men of the RFA Special Reserve would form Brigade Ammunition Columns for the Regular RFA brigades on the outbreak of war.

== Uniforms and insignia ==
When the unit was formed in 1853 it was at first uniformed in dark 'workhouse' grey, then in a military pensioner's blue Frock coat with red cuffs, and blue trousers with red piping down the side. In 1855 the uniform was assimilated to that of the Regular RA, in blue with red facings and trouser stripe, but with silver/white lace and piping instead of gold/yellow. The ornate badge on the officers' full dress helmet ca 1853–60 incorporated the Coat of arms of the City of Norwich. Busbies replaced these helmets and the ORs' bell-topped shakos in 1860. When the busbies were withdrawn from the Regular RA in 1878, the militia artillery were not issued with the replacement blue cloth Home Service helmet. The Norfolk unit was permitted to wear the new helmet, provided it was not at public expense, so George Astley, 20th Baron Hastings, nephew of the first commanding officer and himself a lieutenant in the unit, presented helmets for all the men. The helmet plates were of the standard Eastern Division RA pattern, with the words 'NORFOLK ARTILLERY' on the lowermost scroll. On the khaki service dress ca 1907 the ORs wore a brass shoulder title with 'RGA" over 'NORFOLK'.

== Honorary Colonels ==
The following served as Honorary Colonel of the unit:

- Jacob Astley, 17th Lord Hastings, former commanding officer (CO), appointed 24 May 1856.
- Edward, Prince of Wales, appointed May 1872; succeeded as King Edward VII 1901, and subsequently became Colonel-in-Chief.
- Charles, 5th Lord Suffield, GCVO, KCB, VD, former CO, appointed 9 November 1906.

=== Other notable members ===
- John Penrice, Great Yarmouth photographer and Quran scholar, served as captain and then major from 1 June 1855.
- Hon Ralph Harbord, former captain in the 71st Foot, and Hon Harbord Harbord, younger brothers of Lt-Col Lord Suffield, commissioned as captain (30 May 1859) and lieutenant (8 April 1859) respectively; Harbord Harbord later achieved the honorary rank of lt-col.
- Sir William ffolkes, MP, served as a lieutenant from 17 April 1868
- Capt the Hon Assheton Harbord, younger son of Lt-Col Lord Suffield, was granted the honorary rank of major on 17 April 1895.
- Edwin Alderson, served as a lieutenant 1876–78 before transferring to the Royal Scots; later Lieutenant-General commanding the Canadian Expeditionary Force in World War I.
- George Astley, 20th Baron Hastings, nephew of the first commanding officer and son-in-law of Lt-Col Lord Suffield, served as lieutenant and later captain from 21 May 1888, and his younger brother the Hon Henry Jacob was commissioned as lieutenant on 13 April 1889.
- Hon George Keppel, formerly of the Gordon Highlanders, was commissioned as lieutenant on 13 April 1899; his wife Alice Keppel was Edward VII's mistress.
- Walter, Viscount Bury, nephew of the above, later 9th Earl of Albemarle, commissioned as lieutenant on 25 August 1900 before transferring to the Scots Guards the following year.
- Baron Maurice de Forest, early motor racing driver, MP, and later a Count of Liechtenstein, served as second lieutenant between 1900 and 1903 before transferring to the Staffordshire Yeomanry.
- Hon Lt-Col Sir Thomas Leigh Hare, 1st Baronet, first commissioned as a sub-lieutenant in the corps on 20 May 1876, later a lieutenant in the Scots Guards, was appointed captain on 21 July 1894 and major on 7 May 1904
- Hon Bertram Gurdon (later 2nd Lord Cranworth) was commissioned into the corps as a 2nd lieutenant on 25 August 1900 and was wounded in South Africa; he later won a Military Cross during World War I.

== Precursor units ==
The Honourable Artillery Company of Norwich formed in response to the Jacobite rebellion of 1715 was a Volunteer rather than Militia unit. It modelled itself on the Honourable Artillery Company of London and was in fact an infantry company. It assembled in St Andrew's Hall Garden, and used the 'low rooms by the porch' to store their weapons. It existed until about 1740, and was revived as the Artillery Company of the City of Norwich at the time of the Jacobite rebellion of 1745, finally disappearing in 1750.

The West and East Norfolk Militia may have provided men to serve guns in 1799, and there was a corps of Volunteer Artillery at Yarmouth by 1805.

== See also ==
- Norfolk Militia
- West Norfolk Militia
- East Norfolk Militia
- Eastern Division, Royal Artillery
- Militia Artillery units of the United Kingdom and Colonies
