= Dictionary and Glossary of the Koran =

Reference work by John Penrice (1873)

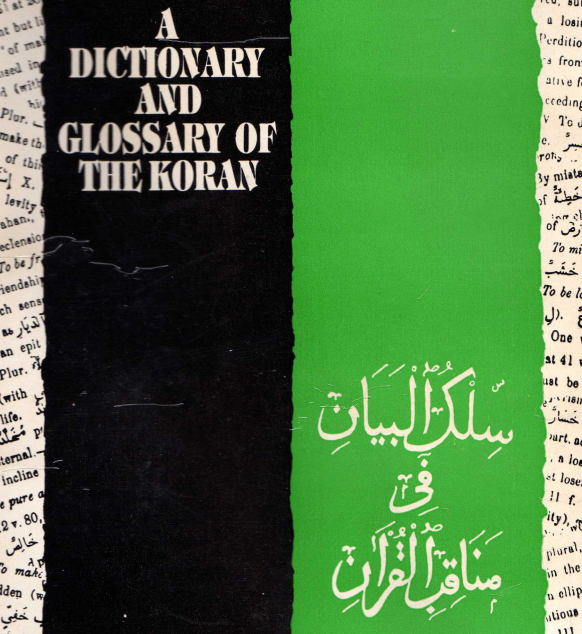
An image of the title page of the book, "Dictionary and Glossary of the Koran" by John Penrice (1873)

A Dictionary and Glossary of the Koran, was first published in 1873 by John Penrice. It is a small compact reference guide consisting of 180 pages. It contains detailed entries on parts of speech and the meanings of words of the Quran.

== Overview ==
A Dictionary and Glossary of the Koran is an Arabic/English reference guide that provides information on the speech and meaning of words in the Quran. The work also contains passages that explain the Islamic tenents and articles of worship, in order to make the text more comprehensive. While writing the text Penrice saw Gustav Flügel's Concordantiae Corani arabicae as a "sheet anchor" for his work.

Per El-Said Badawi, the work was the first of its kind and "for a long time the only one". The book has been considered pioneering by Shawkat Toorawa, who noted that it was still useful.

Little is known about the author beyond his authorship of A Dictionary and Glossary of the Koran, with Toorawa stating that he was a Patron of the Living in the Diocese of Norwich.

== Publication history ==
A Dictionary and Glossary of the Koran was first published in 1873 and has been repeatedly republished. Some companies that have republished the work have included the 1988 publication by Adam Publishers & Distributors, as well as the 2006 publication by Asian Educational Services, which had revised the text to include traditional verse numbering.

== Reception ==
In 1874, a year after publication, The Academy reviewed the book, stating that "it is a pity that a glossary such as this, which appears to have many of the qualities which combine to form a handy help to beginners, should be marred by a suspicion of plagiarism", apparently from Edward William Lane's Arabic–English Lexicon. A 1971 reprint was reviewed by Peter F. Abboud in The Middle East Journal, who noted that the book was designed for previous generations, but would still be a "handy and useful companion" for students. Similarly, Clifford Edmund Bosworth's review in the Journal of Semitic Studies stated that while the book was helpful for students, for "the serious Arabist, however, the value of the book is small". He pointed out that the book was "worth reprinting only inasmuch as nothing similar or better has appeared since".
