= William Windham Sr. =

English landowner (1717–1761)

William Windham FRS
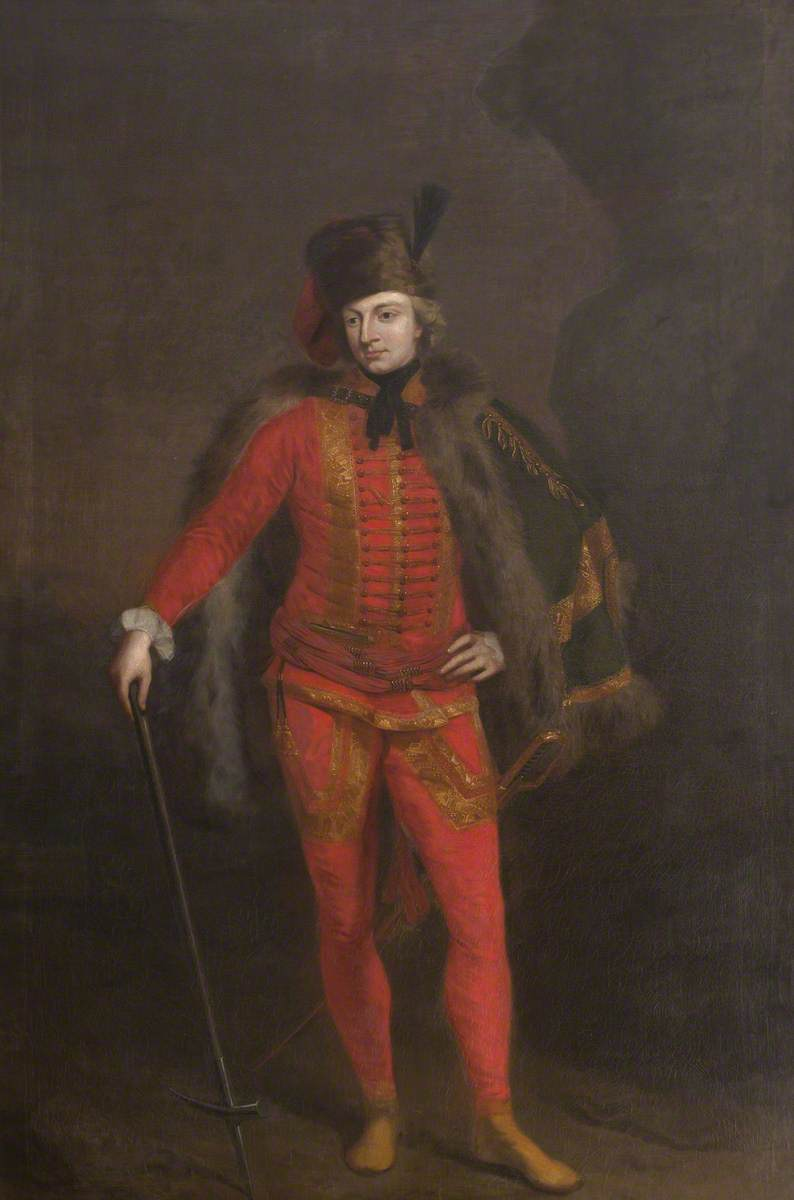
- Born: 1717; England
- Died: 30 October 1761 (aged 43–44)
- Occupations: Landowner and writer
- Children: William Windham
- Father: Ashe Windham

William Windham, FRS (1717 – 30 October 1761) was an English landowner and writer. The son of Ashe Windham and Elizabeth Dobyns, he made an extensive Grand Tour of Europe in his youth, accompanied by his tutor, Benjamin Stillingfleet; the pair left England in 1737. During 1740–1741, Windham and Stillingfleet were members of a circle of British expatriates known as The Common Room. The circle lived in Geneva, and amused themselves with amateur theatricals (an unusual sight in that Calvinist city).

Other members of the group included Richard Aldworth, the 7th Earl of Haddington and his brother, and Lord Hervey. In June 1741, several members of the circle, including Windham, joined Richard Pococke in making an expedition to Chamonix. They appear to have been the first recorded travellers for pleasure in the region, scaling Montenvers with the aid of local guides and giving the name of "Mer de Glace" to the glacier they subsequently examined. Stillingfleet and Windham returned to Geneva 25 June 1741, and returned to England in July 1742.

Returning to England, he became a friend of the actor David Garrick. In 1744, he published a pamphlet, Letter from an English gentleman ... giving an account of a journey to the glacieres or ice alps of Savoy, describing his experiences and observations there. This piece of work, in addition to a talent for mathematics, secured his admission to the Royal Society on 26 April 1744. He married late, having had an illegitimate daughter, Elizabeth, by his first mistress, Mary Morgan, and marrying his second, the widow Sarah Lukin, on 13 February 1750 shortly before the birth of his son, William, on 3 May 1750.

The year before, Windham's father Ashe died, and he inherited the family seat of Felbrigg Hall. Elizabeth went on to marry Thomas de Grey. After inheriting the house, he took considerable interest in the local militia, particularly in 1756 when the Seven Years' War made a French invasion a possibility. He aided Lord Townshend in forming the West Norfolk Militia in 1757, and the two co-authored A Plan of Discipline, Composed for the use of the Militia of the County of Norfolk in 1759. This work became one of the principal drill manuals used during the American Revolution. However, Windham did not live to see this, as he died of tuberculosis in 1761.
