= Gorleston Barracks =

- Gorleston

Site information
- Type: Barracks
- Owner: War Office
- Operator: British Army

Location
- Location within Norfolk
- Coordinates: 52.600°N 1.723°E

Site history
- Built: 1853
- Built for: War Office
- In use: 1853–1887

Gorleston Barracks was a military installation in Gorleston in Norfolk.

== History ==
The site was originally occupied by a Board of Ordnance store designed by James Wyatt and built in 1806 to supply Royal Navy ships anchored off Great Yarmouth during the Napoleonic Wars. This facility was converted into army barracks to accommodate the Prince of Wales Own Norfolk Artillery Militia in 1853. In 1873 a system of recruiting areas based on counties was instituted under the Cardwell Reforms and the barracks became the depot for the two battalions of the 9th (East Norfolk) Regiment of Foot. Following the Childers Reforms, the regiment evolved to become the Norfolk Regiment with its depot in the barracks in 1881.

The barracks were decommissioned after the Norfolk Regiment moved to Britannia Barracks in Norwich in the 1887. The site was sold to Colman's for food manufacturing in 1890 and then to Great Yarmouth Borough Council in 1924; the buildings suffered some damage during the Second World War.

At some point, the barracks were demolished, and an housing estate called Barrack Estate was built on the site.
