= Britannia Barracks =

Former barracks in Norwich, England

- Norwich
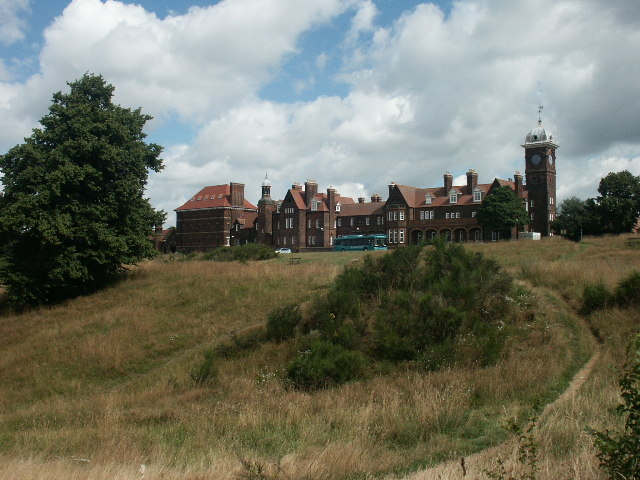
- Britannia Barracks

Site information
- Type: Barracks
- Owner: Ministry of Defence
- Operator: British Army

Location
- Location within Norfolk
- Coordinates: 52.63758°N 1.31753°E

Site history
- Built: 1885–1887
- Built for: War Office
- In use: 1887-Present

Garrison information
- Occupants: Royal Norfolk Regiment

Britannia Barracks was a military installation in Norwich.

== History ==
The barracks were built in the architectural style of Norman Shaw on Mousehold Heath as the depot for the Royal Norfolk Regiment between 1885 and 1887. The name of the barracks was taken from the badge of the Regiment. The barracks served as an Initial Training Centre for recruits during the Second World War. The Regiment remained at the barracks until it amalgamated with the Suffolk Regiment to form the 1st East Anglian Regiment in 1959. Most of the buildings survive as part of Norwich Prison.
