= Lady Mary Coke =

British noble and writer (1727–1811)

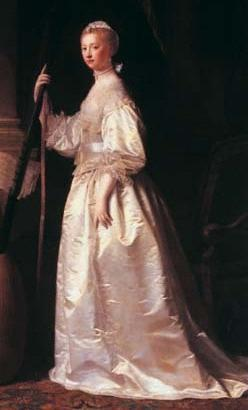
- Lady Mary Coke, by Allan Ramsay.
- Born: 6 February 1727 either at Ham, Surrey or at 27 Bruton Street, London, England
- Died: 30 September 1811 (aged 84); Morton House, Chiswick, England
- Occupations: Author, letter writer, journal writer
- Spouse: Edward Coke, Viscount Coke (m. 1747; died 1753)
- Parent(s): John Campbell, 2nd Duke of Argyll; Jane Warburton

Lady Mary Coke (6 February 1727 – 30 September 1811) was an English noblewoman known for her letters and private journal. She made pointed observations of people in her circle and political figures. Although not intended for publication, an edition of her letters and journal, including entries from 1766 to 1774, was published in 1889 by a distant great-nephew.

== Life ==
=== Marriage and separation ===
She was the fifth and youngest daughter of the soldier and politician John Campbell, 2nd Duke of Argyll (1680–1743), and his second wife, Jane (c.1683–1767), a maid of honour to Queen Anne and Caroline, Princess of Wales. Mary grew up in Sudbrook or in London, visiting her father's ancestral estate at Inveraray Castle in Argyll at least once and possibly more often.

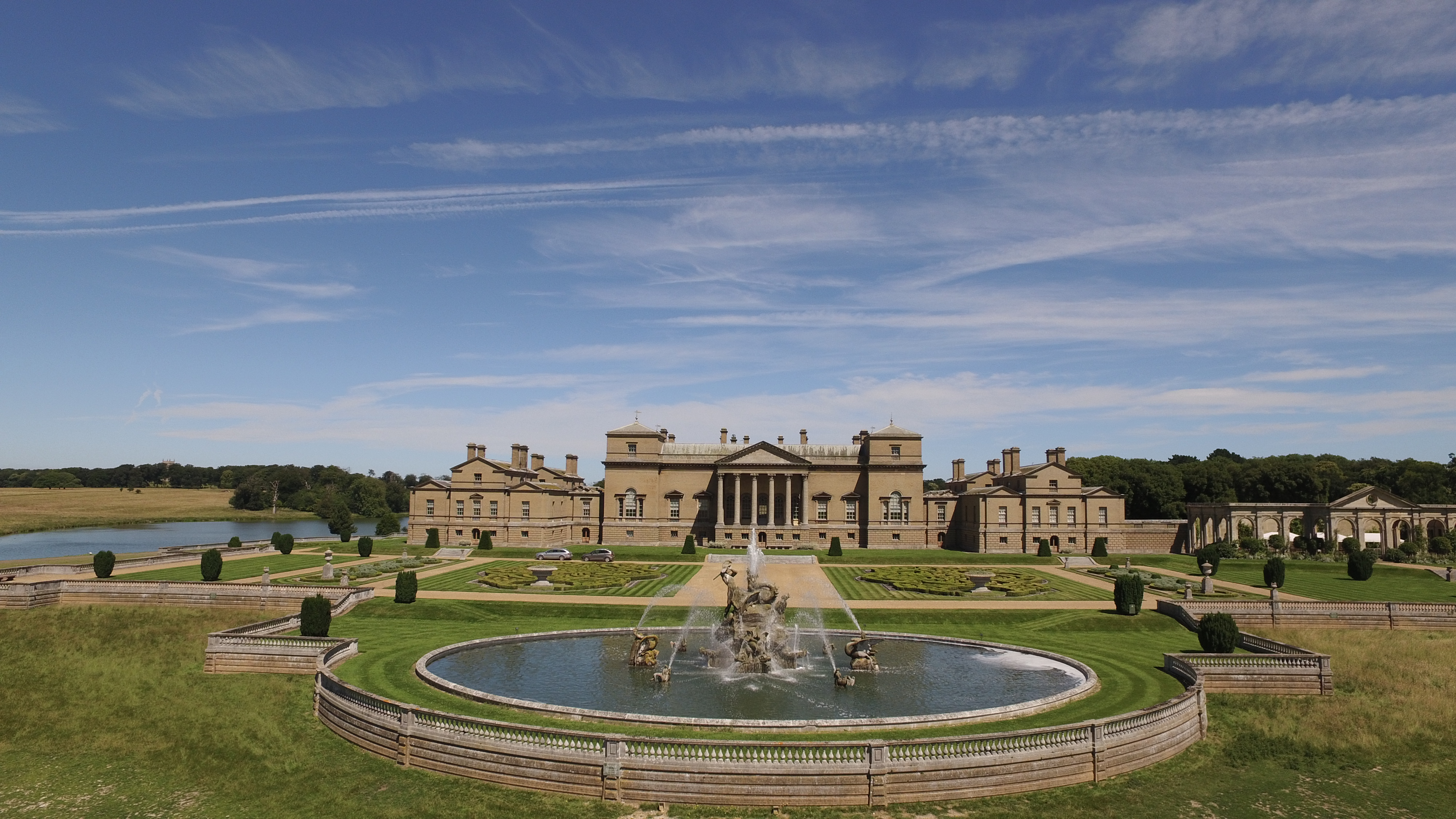
Holkham Hall, Norfolk

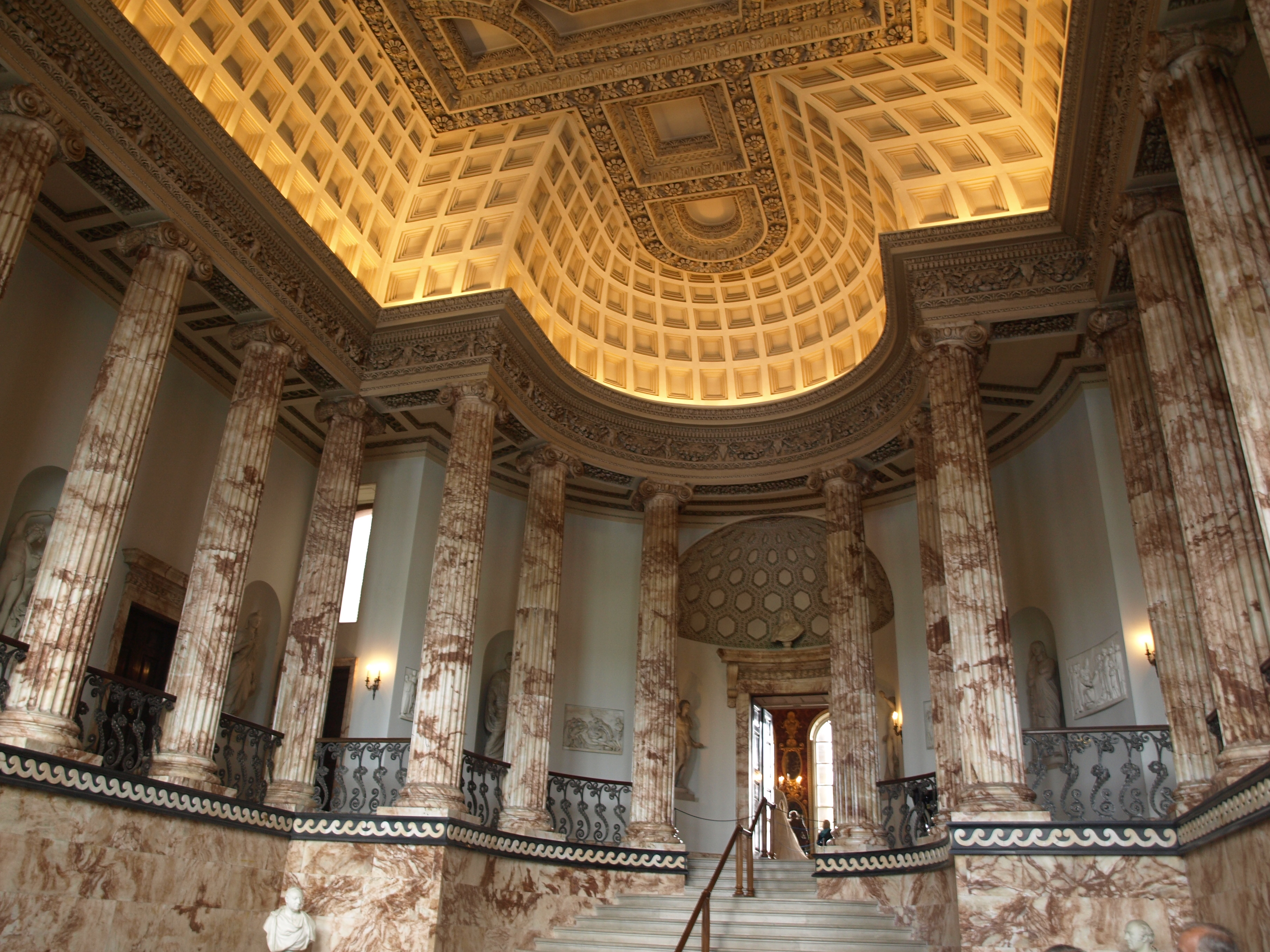
The marble hall at Holkham. The ornate decoration wasn't finished until 1764, overseen by Lady Coke's mother in-law.

She married on 1 April 1747, Edward Coke, Viscount Coke (1719–1753); son of Thomas Coke, 1st Earl of Leicester and Lady Margaret Tufton. Their courtship had been strained, and in retaliation Edward left her alone on their wedding night and from then on virtually imprisoned her at his family estate at Holkham Hall, Norfolk with his parents. She reacted by refusing to have intercourse with him. She never used the title Viscountess Coke.

Their families went to litigation, and eventually produced a settlement in 1750 whereby Lady Mary could live with her mother at Sudbrook but had to remain married to Coke until his death, which came in 1753, when Mary was 26. Already having received a handsome legacy from her father, she set out on her life of independence (she never remarried), that became (as her entry in the Dictionary of National Biography puts it) "marked by gossip, travel, devotion to royalty, and self-imposed misadventure".

Mary occupied Aubrey House, in the Campden Hill area of Holland Park from 1767 to 1788. A London County Council blue plaque commemorates her and other residents of the house. In 1786 she purchased a house in Chelsea from the Ashburnham estate and in 1793, she purchased additional land at Sandy End, Chelsea. In 1807, she sold her Chelsea estate and moved to her final home at Chiswick.

=== Royal romance? ===
In her grandiose shows of grief on the death of Prince Edward, Duke of York and Albany, in 1767, Lady Mary alleged in veiled hints that they had been secretly married, a claim that brought her further derision. He had been a subject of an intensely emotional and lengthy flirtation, which she alleged had been passionate on both sides. According to most accounts, the relationship had been one-sided, with York regarding it and her as a joke.

=== Trips to Europe ===
On her first trip to Europe in 1770–71, Lady Mary became a friend of Empress Maria Theresa and was warmly welcomed at the Viennese court. She alienated her friend on her third visit in 1773 by interfering in court intrigue. Mary, however, did not see that this predicament had been self-inflicted and from then on saw any disaster – servants' incompetence, unsuccessful auction bids, rheumatism – as part of a Maria Theresa-instigated plot pursuing her across Europe. Emily Barry (née Stanhope, Countess of Barrymore, and wife of the 6th Earl) was accused by Mary of luring away her previously faithful servant whilst she was in Paris in 1775, to aid an alleged assassination plot against her by Maria Theresa's daughter Marie Antoinette and her underlings.

=== Walpole ===
It was the 1775 event which finally drove away another of Coke's close friends, Horace Walpole. Though devoted and mock-gallant in his flattery of her (his The Castle of Otranto in 1765 was dedicated to her), Walpole also believed that she had a lack of a sense of humour and pride in her own self-importance which made most of her misfortunes self-inflicted. He called her and two of her sisters (Caroline Townshend, Baroness Greenwich, and Lady Betty Mackenzie) the three furies, and wrote elsewhere:

'She was much a friend of mine, but a later marriage, which she particularly disapproved, having flattered herself with the hopes of one just a step higher, has a little cooled our friendship. In short, though she is so greatly born, she has a frenzy for royalty, and will fall in love with and at the feet of the Great Duke and Duchess, especially the former, for next to being an empress herself, she adores the Empress Queen, or did—for perhaps that passion not being quite reciprocal, may have waned. However ... Lady Mary has a thousand virtues and good qualities: she is noble, generous, high-spirited, undauntable, is most friendly, sincere, affectionate, and above any mean action. She loves attention, and I wish you to pay it even for my sake, for I would do anything to serve her. I have often tried to laugh her out of her weakness, but as she is very serious, she is so in that, and if all the sovereigns in Europe combined to slight her, she still would put her trust in the next generation of princes. Her heart is excellent, and deserves and would become a crown, and that is the best of all excuses for desiring one.'

=== Political observer ===
Lady Mary saw evidence of a conspiracy (this time a Catholic one against the Protestant succession) in Margaret Nicholson's attempt to assassinate George III in 1786 and Maria Fitzherbert's rumoured marriage to George, Prince of Wales.

Some of her observations were more accurate, for example her praise of the Duchess of Devonshire's political skill, in 1787: "As soon as ever any young man comes from abroad he is immediately invited to Devonshire House and to Chatsworth—and by that means he is to be of the [Whig] opposition". She avidly collected political information, deploying it to protect herself, her friends and her family, and passing it on to her sisters in her journal. She was a frequent visitor to the Houses of Commons and Lords, witnessing political controversies such as Warren Hastings's trial and the debate over the Cumberland election petition in 1768 (in which she backed Sir James Lowther).

=== Death ===
She bought Morton House, Chiswick, in 1807, four years before her death there in 1811. She appreciated that Sir Stephen Fox had built it late in the 17th century and the house had been little altered since. After her death, it was acquired by the Duke of Devonshire.

Lady Mary was buried in Westminster Abbey in her father's family vault on 11 October 1811.

== Journal ==
Lady Mary is mainly known from her journal, never intended for publication and instead written for self-amusement and for the amusement of her sisters, most especially Anne (1719/20–1785), who had married William Wentworth, 2nd Earl of Strafford, in 1741. Her Oxford Dictionary of National Biography (DNB) entry states: "The journal ranges from banal descriptions of card games and weather to perceptive social observation and expressions of sincere affection, often closely and unselfconsciously juxtaposed. The personality which emerges from the whole combines elements of the mundane and the preposterous with the deeply sympathetic."

She began writing it in August 1766 and stopped making regular additions in January 1791, when Anne's husband died. The published edition includes entries only up to December 1774. (Her great-great-great-nephew James Archibald Home edited this edition.) After 1791, Lady Mary continued to pass on her opinions to friends and relatives, such as her niece Lady Frances Scott (her sister Caroline's daughter by her first marriage to Francis, earl of Dalkeith) and her first cousin once removed Lady Louisa Stuart. Louisa Stuart in 1827 wrote an acerbic memoir of Lady Mary, which is another major source for her life.

== Publication ==
- Lady Mary Coke (1889). James Archibald Home (ed.). The letters and journals of Lady Mary Coke.

== Sources ==
- DNB
