= Wenman Coke (died 1776) =

British politician and landowner

Wenman Coke

Wenman Coke (ca. 1717 – 11 April 1776), known as Wenman Roberts until 1750, was a British landowner and politician who sat in the House of Commons between 1753 and 1776.

== Background ==
Born Wenman Roberts, he was the son of Major Philip Roberts (a grandson of Sir Francis Wenman, 1st Baronet) and Anne Coke, daughter of Edward Coke and Carey Newton. He assumed the surname of Coke (pronounced "Cook") in lieu of his patronymic in 1750. In 1759 he succeeded to the substantial estates of his uncle, Thomas Coke, 1st Earl of Leicester, including the Coke family seat of Holkham Hall, Norfolk. Wenman's great-great grandfather, Sir Lewes Roberts (1596–1641), was a British merchant with the Levant and East India companies and an economist/writer on foreign commerce topics. Wenman's mother, Anne Coke, descended from the great barrister and jurist Sir Edward Coke and from Thomas Osborne, 1st Duke of Leeds on her father, Edward Coke's side. Anne Coke descended from Mary Boleyn Carey and Sir John Newton on her mother, Carey Newton's side. Anne Coke's grandfather, Sir John Newton, 3rd Baronet, was a third cousin of Sir Isaac Newton.

== Political career ==
Coke was returned to Parliament for Derby in 1772. At the 1774 general election he was returned for both Derby and Norfolk, and chose to sit for the latter. He continued to represent this constituency until his death two years later.

== Family ==
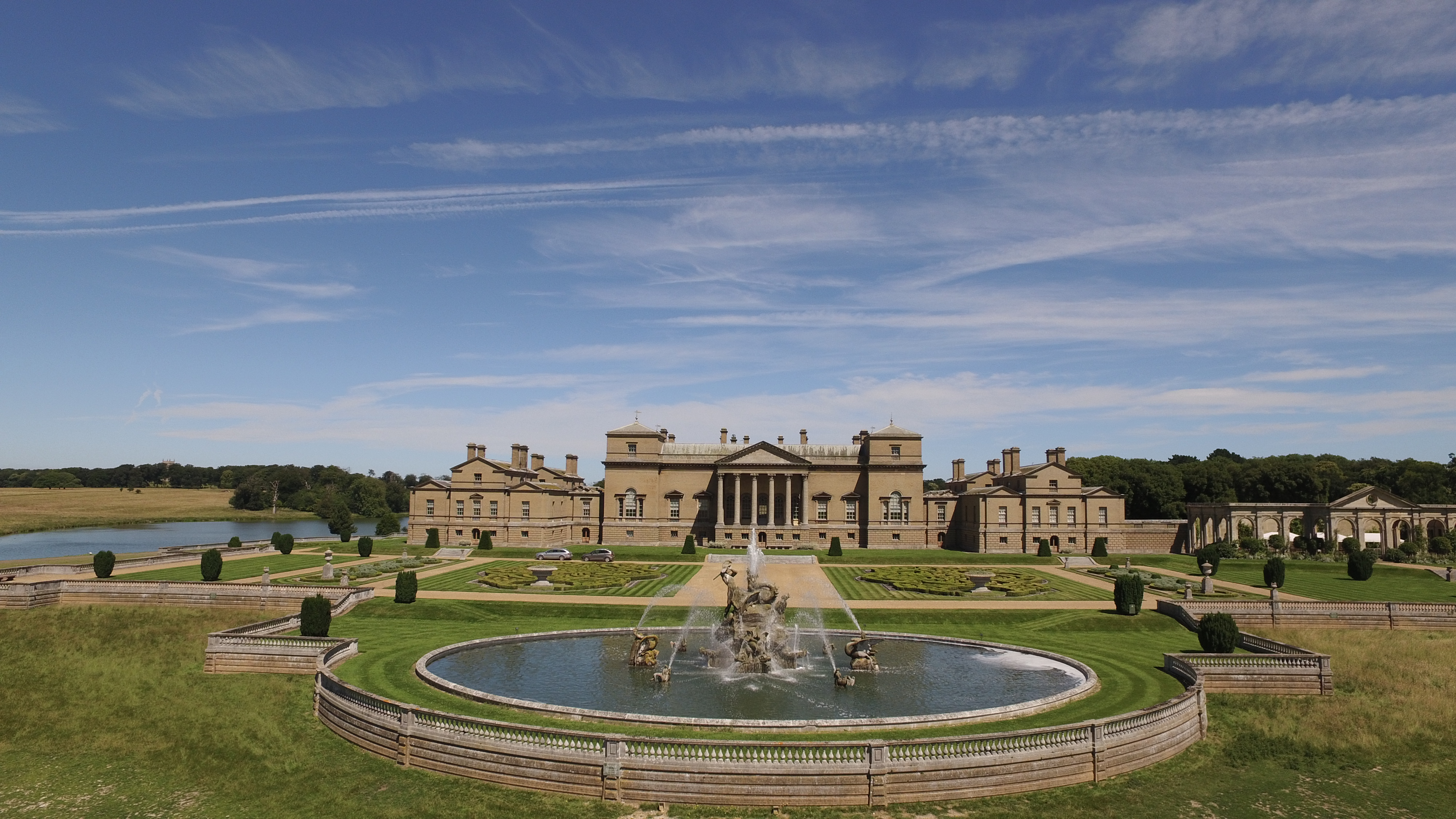
Holkham Hall, Norfolk

Wenman Coke died in 1776. He had married Elizabeth Chamberlayne, daughter of George Chamberlayne, and had several children, including Thomas Coke, 1st Earl of Leicester (6 May 1754 – 30 June 1842) and Edward Coke (b. 28 June 1758). His wife survived him by over 30 years and died in 1810.

His son Thomas succeeded him to Holkham Hall and, as Member of Parliament for Norfolk, he became an influential agricultural reformer. In 1837 the earldom of Leicester was revived in his favour.

Parliament of Great Britain
Preceded by John Phillipson; Viscount Coke	Member of Parliament for Harwich; 1753–1761; With: John Phillipson 1753–1756; Viscount Duncannon 1756–1758; Thomas Sewell 1758–1761	Succeeded by Charles Townshend; John Roberts
Preceded by Robert Vyner; George Brydges Rodney	Member of Parliament for Okehampton; 1761–1768; With: Alexander Forrester	Succeeded by Thomas Pitt; Thomas Brand
Preceded by Lord Frederick Cavendish; William Fitzherbert	Member of Parliament for Derby; 1772–1774; With: Lord Frederick Cavendish	Succeeded by Lord Frederick Cavendish; John Gisborne
Preceded by Thomas de Grey; Sir Edward Astley	Member of Parliament for Norfolk; 1774–1776; With: Sir Edward Astley	Succeeded by Sir Edward Astley; Thomas Coke
