= Norfolk (UK Parliament constituency) =

Parliamentary constituency in the United Kingdom, 1801–1832

- Former county constituency for the House of Commons

1290–1832
- Seats: two
- Replaced by: East Norfolk, West Norfolk

Norfolk was a County constituency of the House of Commons of the Parliament of England from 1290 to 1707, then of the Parliament of Great Britain from 1707 to 1800 and of the Parliament of the United Kingdom from 1801 to 1832. It was represented by two Members of Parliament. In 1832 the county was divided for parliamentary purposes into two new two member divisions – East Norfolk and West Norfolk.

== History ==
=== Boundaries ===
The constituency consisted of the historic county of Norfolk in the East of England, excluding the city of Norwich which had the status of a county corporate after 1404. (Although Norfolk contained four other parliamentary boroughs – Castle Rising, Great Yarmouth, King's Lynn and Thetford – each of which elected two MPs in its own right for part of the period when Norfolk was a constituency, these were not excluded from the county constituency: owning property within a borough could confer a vote at the county election. This was not the case, though, for Norwich.)

=== Franchise and electorate ===
As in other county constituencies the franchise between 1430 and 1832 was defined by the Forty Shilling Freeholder Act, which gave the right to vote to every man who possessed freehold property within the county valued at £2 or more per year for the purposes of land tax; it was not necessary for the freeholder to occupy his land, nor even in later years to be resident in the county at all.

Except during the period of the Commonwealth, Norfolk had two MPs elected by the bloc vote method, under which each voter had two votes. In the nominated Barebones Parliament of 1653, five members represented Norfolk. In the First and Second Parliaments of Oliver Cromwell's Protectorate, however, there was a general redistribution of seats and Norfolk elected ten members, while the two smallest of the county's boroughs (Castle Rising and Thetford) lost their seats. The traditional arrangements were restored from 1659.

At the time of the Great Reform Act in 1832, Norfolk had a population of approximately 390,000, though only a fraction of these could vote: the highest recorded turnouts in Norfolk were at the 1802 and 1806 elections, at each of which under 12,000 votes were cast, even though each voter could cast two votes.

=== Political character ===
Norfolk's electorate was predominantly rural, partly as an effect of the Norwich freeholders voting in the city rather than the county. It has been estimated from the pollbooks that in the early 19th century only around one in six of the voters lived in towns, with Great Yarmouth and King's Lynn contributing the largest numbers of these. Fittingly for such a constituency, the families of two of the best-known pioneers of the agrarian revolution, Coke of Holkham and "Turnip" Townshend, frequently provided the county's Members of Parliament.

Nevertheless, no one or two families controlled the constituency, and competition was fostered by the leading families lining up on different sides of the partisan divide. The leading Whig families around the turn of the 18th century were those of Walpole and Townshend, while the most important Tory interests were those of the Wodehouse and Astley families, until Sir Jacob Astley defected to the Whigs before the 1715 election. By the middle of the 18th century, the list of local peerage families who could expect to exert influence at Norfolk elections had grown to include the Hobart Earls of Buckinghamshire, the Earls Cholmondeley and the Lord Suffield, but these magnates remained divided, with contention between support for the "court" and "country" factions within the Whigs as well as between Whigs and Tories.

Consequently, the independent voters generally held the balance of power. But this did not prevent the various leading families from monopolising the representation between them, a process that accelerated in the 18th century: 16 different families represented Norfolk in the 22 Parliaments from 1660 to 1746, but only 7 in the 18 Parliaments from 1747 to 1832. The minor gentry could not expect to secure election for themselves, only to choose between the candidates of the major families. The Cokes of Holkham were generally regarded as the champions of the independent freeholders, and were frequently elected. Elections in Norfolk were therefore rarely a foregone conclusion, and often hard-fought at the canvassing stage even when the contest was not carried to a poll.

Elections were held at a single polling place, Norwich, and voters from the rest of the county had to travel to the county town to exercise their franchise. It was normal for voters to expect the candidates for whom they voted to meet their expenses in travelling to the poll, making the cost of a contested election substantial. Contested elections were therefore the exception rather than the rule, potential candidates preferring to canvass support beforehand and usually not insisting on a vote being taken unless they were confident of winning; at all but 8 of the 29 general elections between 1701 and 1832, Norfolk's two MPs were elected unopposed, with only two contests after 1768. But this was more frequent than in many other counties of Norfolk's size.

== Members of Parliament ==
=== 1290–1640 ===
- Constituency created (1290)

Parliament	First member	Second member
c1290–1327	Robert Baynard	
1377 (Jan)	Sir Stephen Hales	
1379	Sir Thomas Gissing	
1380 (Jan)	Sir Stephen Hales	
1380	Sir Thomas Gissing	
1380	Sir Roger Walsingham	
1381	Sir Stephen Hales	Sir Thomas Gerbridge
1382 (May)	Sir Stephen Hales	Sir Thomas Gerbridge
1382 (Oct)	Sir Stephen Hales	Sir Roger Walsingham
1383 (Feb)	Sir Stephen Hales	
1383 (Oct)	Sir Stephen Hales	
1383	Sir Roger Walsingham	
1384 (Nov)	Sir Stephen Hales	
1386	Sir Stephen Hales	Sir Thomas Gerbridge
1388 (Feb)	Sir John Strange	Sir John White
1388 (Sep)	Sir John Strange	Sir John White
1390 (Jan)	William Rees	Sir John White
1390 (Nov)	Sir Robert Berney	Hugh Fastolf
1391	Sir Robert Berney	Sir John White
1393	Sir Ralph Shelton	Sir John Curson
1394	William Rees	Sir John White
1395	Sir Robert Berney	Sir John White
1397 (Jan)	William Rees	Sir John Curdon
1397 (Sep)	Sir Nicholas Dagworth	Sir Edmund Thorpe
1399	Sir Robert Berney	John Gurney
1401	John Payn	John Wynter
1402	Sir Ralph Shelton	Sir Robert Berney
1404 (Jan)	John Reymes	John Wynter
1404 (Oct)	John Gurney	Sir Edmund Oldhall
1406	Sir Edmund Noon	John Reymes
1407	Sir Edmund Thorpe	John Wynter
1410	John Wodehouse	John Wynter
1411	Sir Edmund Oldhall	John Wynter
1413 (Feb)		
1413 (May)	Sir Edmund Oldhall	John Wynter
1414 (Apr)	Sir Robert Berney	John Wynter
1414 (Nov)	Sir John Ingoldisthorpe	John Wodehouse
1415		
1416 (Mar)	Sir Edmund Oldhall	John Wodehouse
1416 (Oct)		
1417	Sir Edmund Oldhall	John Wodehouse
1419	John Lancaster	Oliver Groos
1420	Sir John Radcliffe	Edmund Winter
1421 (May)	John Lancaster	John Wodehouse
1421 (Dec)	John Lancaster	Edmund Winter
1422	John Lancaster	Edmund Winter
1427	Edmund Winter	
1429	Edmund Winter	
1432	Edmund Winter	Sir Thomas Tuddenham
1435	Edmund Winter	Sir Thomas Tuddenham
1437	Edmund Winter	
1442	Sir Thomas Tuddenham	
1449	Thomas Shernborne	
1450	Henry Gray	
1460	John Paston	
1461	John Paston	
1463	William Knyvett	
1467	John Paston	
1467	William Knyvett	
1470	William Knyvett	
1491	__? Calthorpe	
1492	Ralph Shelton	
1495	Sir Thomas Lovell	
1510–1523	No names known	
1529	Sir Roger Townsend	Sir James Boleyn
1536	?Sir Roger Townsend	?
1539	Richard Southwell	Edmund Wyndham
1539	?Sir Nicholas Hare	
1542	Sir Roger Townsend	?Sir Richard Southwell
1545	Sir Thomas Paston	Christopher Heydon
1547	Sir Edmund Knyvet, died 1550 and repl.Jan 1552 by Sir Robert Dudley	Sir Nicholas Lestrange
1553 (Mar)	Sir Robert Dudley	Sir Thomas Radcliffe
1553 (Oct)	Sir Richard Southwell	Sir Henry Bedingfield
1554 (Apr)	Sir Richard Southwell	Sir Henry Bedingfield
1554 (Nov)	Sir Richard Southwell	Sir John Shelton
1555	Sir John Clere	John Appleyard
1558	Sir Henry Bedingfield	Sir William Woodhouse
1558–59	Sir Robert Dudley	Sir Edmund Wyndham
1562–63	Sir William Woodhouse	Sir Edward Warner
1566	Both died and replaced 1566 by Clement Paston and Roger Townshend	
1571	Sir Christopher Heydon	Sir William Butts
1572	Henry Woodhouse	Francis Wyndham made judge and repl. 1581 by Sir Roger Woodhouse
Parliament of Oct 1584–1585	Sir Drue Drury	Nathaniel Bacon
Parliament of 1586–1587	Thomas Farmer	William Gresham
Parliament of 1588–1589	Sir Henry Woodhouse	Christopher Heydon
Parliament of 1593	Edward Coke	Nathaniel Bacon
Parliament of 1597–1598	Henry Gawdy	Sir John Townshend
Parliament of 1601	Henry Gawdy	Sir Bassingbourne Gawdy
Parliament of 1604–1611	Sir Nathaniel Bacon	Sir Charles Cornwallis
Addled Parliament (1614)	Sir Henry Bedingfield	Sir Hamon le Strange
Parliament of 1621–1622	Drue Drury	Sir Hamon le Strange
Happy Parliament (1624–1625)	Sir Thomas Holland	Sir John Corbet, 1st Baronet
Useless Parliament (1625)	Sir Edward Coke	Sir Edmund Bacon, 2nd Baronet, of Redgrave
Parliament of 1625–1626	Sir Edward Coke	Sir Anthony Drury
Parliament of 1626	Sir Edward Coke	Sir Robert Bell
Parliament of 1628	Sir Roger Townshend, 1st Baronet	John Heveningham
1629–1640	No Parliaments summoned	

=== 1640–1832 ===
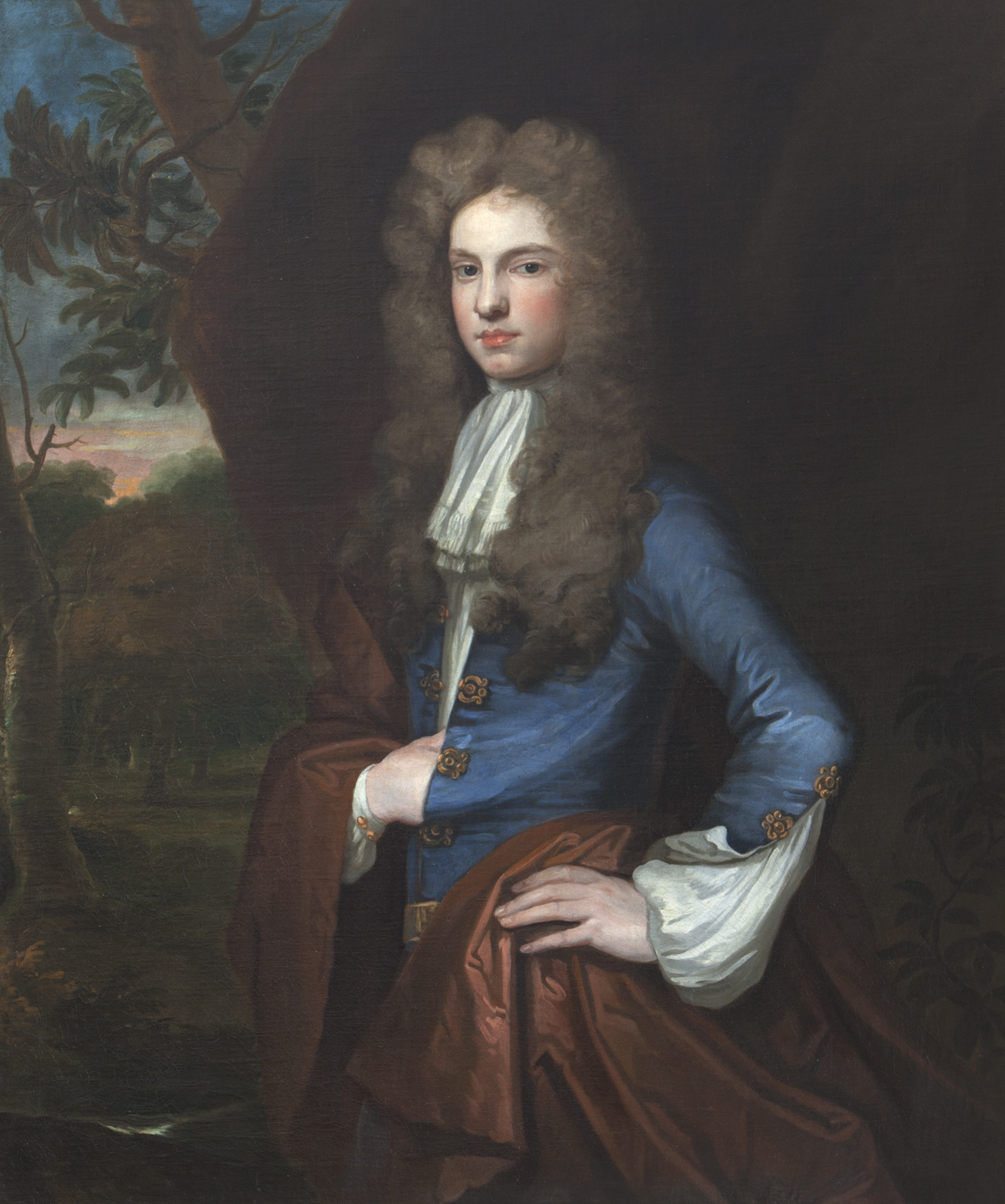
Ashe Windham was an MP for Norfolk from 1708 to 1710.

Year	1st Member	1st Party	2nd Member	2nd Party
April 1640	Sir Edmund Moundeford	Parliamentarian	Sir John Holland, Bt	Parliamentarian
November 1640	Sir Edmund Moundeford	Parliamentarian	(Sir) John Potts	Parliamentarian
1645	Sir John Hobart, Bt	Parliamentarian	(Sir) John Potts	Parliamentarian
1647	Sir John Palgrave, Bt	Parliamentarian	(Sir) John Potts	Parliamentarian
December 1648	Palgrave and Potts excluded in Pride's Purge – both seats vacant			
Norfolk was represented by five members in the Barebones Parliament
1653	Robert Jermy (?); Tobias Frere; Ralph Wolmer; Henry King; William Burton			
Norfolk was represented by ten members in the First and Second Parliaments of the Protectorate
1654	Sir John Hobart; Sir William D'Oyly; Sir Ralph Hare, Bt; Thomas Weld; Robert Wilton; Thomas Sotherton; Philip Wodehouse; Robert Wood (senior); Philip Bedingfield (senior); Tobias Frere			
1656	Sir John Hobart; Charles Fleetwood; Sir William D'Oyly; Sir Ralph Hare, Bt; Sir Horatio Townsend; Colonel Robert Wilton; Philip Wodehouse; Colonel Robert Wood; John Buxton; Thomas Sotherton			
Representation reverted to two members in the Third Protectorate Parliament
January 1659	Sir Horatio Townsend		Sir William D'Oyly	
May 1659	Not represented in the restored Rump			
April 1660	The Lord Cramond		Sir Horatio Townshend	
1661	The Lord Cramond		Sir Ralph Hare, Bt	
1673	The Lord Cramond		Sir John Hobart, Bt	
1675	Sir Robert Kemp, Bt		Sir John Hobart, Bt	
February 1679	Sir Christopher Calthorpe		Sir Nevill Catlin	
May 1679	Sir John Hobart, Bt		Sir Nevill Catlin	
August 1679	Sir John Hobart, Bt		Sir Peter Gleane, Bt	
1685	Sir Thomas Hare, Bt		Sir Jacob Astley, Bt	Tory
1689	Sir William Cook, Bt	Tory	Sir Henry Hobart, Bt	Whig
1690	Sir William Cook, Bt	Tory	Sir Jacob Astley, Bt	Tory
1695	Sir Henry Hobart, Bt	Whig	Sir Jacob Astley, Bt	Tory
1698	Sir William Cook, Bt	Tory	Sir Jacob Astley, Bt	Tory
January 1701	Hon. Roger Townshend	Whig	Sir Jacob Astley, Bt	Tory
December 1701	Hon. Roger Townshend	Whig	Sir John Holland, Bt	
1702	Sir Jacob Astley, Bt	Tory	Sir John Holland, Bt	
1705	Hon. Roger Townshend	Whig	Sir John Holland, Bt	
1708	Ashe Windham		Sir John Holland, Bt	
1710	Sir John Wodehouse, Bt	Tory	Sir Jacob Astley, Bt	Tory
1713	Sir Edmund Bacon, Bt		Sir Jacob Astley, Bt	Whig
1715	Thomas de Grey	Whig	Sir Jacob Astley, Bt	Whig
1722	Thomas de Grey	Whig	Sir Thomas Coke	Whig
1727	Sir John Hobart, Bt	Whig	Sir Thomas Coke	Whig
1728	Harbord Harbord		Sir Edmund Bacon, Bt	Tory
1734	William Wodehouse	Tory	Sir Edmund Bacon, Bt	Tory
1737	Armine Wodehouse	Tory	Sir Edmund Bacon, Bt	Tory
1741	Armine Wodehouse	Tory	Viscount Coke	Whig
1747	Armine Wodehouse	Tory	Hon. George Townshend	Whig
1764	Armine Wodehouse	Tory	Thomas de Grey	
1768	Sir Edward Astley, Bt		Thomas de Grey	
1774	Sir Edward Astley, Bt		Wenman Coke	
1776	Sir Edward Astley, Bt		Thomas Coke	
1784	Sir Edward Astley, Bt		Sir John Wodehouse, Bt	
1790	Thomas Coke	Whig	Sir John Wodehouse, Bt	
1797	Thomas Coke	Whig	Jacob Astley	
1806	Thomas Coke	Whig	William Windham	Whig
March 1807	Edward Coke	Whig	Sir Jacob Astley, Bt	Whig
May 1807	Thomas Coke	Whig	Sir Jacob Astley, Bt	Whig
1817	Thomas Coke	Whig	Edmond Wodehouse	Tory
1830	Thomas Coke	Whig	Sir William ffolkes, Bt	Whig
1832	Constituency abolished see: Norfolk East and Norfolk West			

== Election results 1710–1832 ==
Note on percentage change calculations: Where there was only one candidate of a party in successive elections, for the same number of seats, change is calculated on the party percentage vote. Where there was more than one candidate, in one or both successive elections for the same number of seats, then change is calculated on the individual percentage vote.

Note on sources: The information for the election results given below is taken from Sedgwick 1715–1754, Stooks Smith 1715–1754, Namier and Brooke 1754–1790 and Stooks Smith 1790–1832.

1710s – 1720s – 1730s – 1740s – 1750s – 1760s – 1770s – 1780s – 1790s – 1800s – 1810s – 1820s – 1830s

=== Elections in the 1710s ===
General election 1710: Norfolk (2 seats)
Party	Candidate	Votes	%	±%
Tory	John Wodehouse	3,216	27.73	N/A
Tory	Jacob Astley	3,200	27.60	N/A
Nonpartisan	Ashe Windham	2,783	24.00	N/A
Whig	Robert Walpole	2,397	20.67	N/A
Turnout		11,596	N/A	N/A

- Note (1710): Stooks Smith, whose compilation of results normally starts with the 1715 general election, is the source for this result. He gives no party classification for the candidates, but for three of them the position is obvious from the survey of Norfolk politics in The History of Parliament 1715–1754. Windham was probably a Whig, but this has not yet been confirmed.
- Note (1713): No source for the full result of this election has yet been located. Sir Jacob Astley was re-elected as a Tory but defected to the Whigs during the Parliament.

General election 18 February 1715: Norfolk (2 seats)
Party	Candidate	Votes	%	±%
Whig	Thomas de Grey	3,183	27.17	N/A
Whig	Jacob Astley	3,059	26.11	N/A
Tory	Sir Ralph Hare	2,840	24.24	N/A
Tory	Erasmus Earle	2,635	22.49	N/A
Turnout		11,717	N/A	N/A

=== Elections in the 1720s ===
General election 11 April 1722: Norfolk (2 seats)
Party	Candidate	Votes	%	±%
Whig	Thomas Coke	Unopposed	N/A	N/A
Whig	Thomas de Grey	Unopposed	N/A	N/A

General election 23 August 1727: Norfolk (2 seats)
Party	Candidate	Votes	%	±%
Whig	John Hobart	Unopposed	N/A	N/A
Whig	Thomas Coke	Unopposed	N/A	N/A

- Creation of Hobart as Lord Hobart and of Coke as Lord Lovel.

By-Election 26 June 1728: Norfolk (2 seats)
Party	Candidate	Votes	%	±%
Tory	Edmund Bacon	Unopposed	N/A	N/A
Nonpartisan	Harbord Harbord	Unopposed	N/A	N/A

=== Elections in the 1730s ===
General election 22 May 1734: Norfolk (2 seats)
Party	Candidate	Votes	%	±%
Tory	Edmund Bacon	3,224	25.58	N/A
Tory	William Wodehouse	3,153	25.01	N/A
Whig	William Morden	3,147	24.97	N/A
Whig	Robert Coke	3,081	24.44	N/A
Turnout		12,605	N/A	N/A

- Death of Wodehouse

By-Election 23 March 1737: Norfolk
Party	Candidate	Votes	%	±%
Tory	Armine Wodehouse	Unopposed	N/A	N/A
Tory hold		Swing	N/A	

=== Elections in the 1740s ===
General election 13 May 1741: Norfolk (2 seats)
Party	Candidate	Votes	%	±%
Tory	Armine Wodehouse	Unopposed	N/A	N/A
Whig	Edward Coke	Unopposed	N/A	N/A

General election 1 July 1747: Norfolk (2 seats)
Party	Candidate	Votes	%	±%
Tory	Armine Wodehouse	Unopposed	N/A	N/A
Whig	George Townshend	Unopposed	N/A	N/A

=== Elections in the 1750s ===
General election 8 May 1754: Norfolk (2 seats)
Party	Candidate	Votes	%	±%
Whig	George Townshend	Unopposed	N/A	N/A
Tory	Armine Wodehouse	Unopposed	N/A	N/A

=== Elections in the 1760s ===
General election 1 April 1761: Norfolk (2 seats)
Party	Candidate	Votes	%	±%
Whig	George Townshend	Unopposed	N/A	N/A
Tory	Armine Wodehouse	Unopposed	N/A	N/A

- Succession of Townshend as the 4th Viscount Townshend

By-Election 11 April 1764: Norfolk
Party	Candidate	Votes	%	±%
Nonpartisan	Thomas de Grey	Unopposed	N/A	N/A
Nonpartisan hold		Swing	N/A	

General election 23 March 1768: Norfolk (2 seats)
Party	Candidate	Votes	%	±%
Nonpartisan	Edward Astley	2,978	27.02	N/A
Nonpartisan	Thomas de Grey	2,754	24.99	N/A
Nonpartisan	Armine Wodehouse	2,680	24.32	N/A
Nonpartisan	Wenman Coke	2,609	23.67	N/A
Turnout		11,021	N/A	N/A

- Note (1768): Stooks Smith has different figures for Astley (2,977) and Coke (2,510).

=== Elections in the 1770s ===
General election 26 October 1774: Norfolk (2 seats)
Party	Candidate	Votes	%	±%
Nonpartisan	Edward Astley	Unopposed	N/A	N/A
Nonpartisan	Wenman Coke	Unopposed	N/A	N/A

- Death of Coke

By-Election 8 May 1776: Norfolk
Party	Candidate	Votes	%	±%
Nonpartisan	Thomas Coke	Unopposed	N/A	N/A
Nonpartisan hold		Swing	N/A	

=== Elections in the 1780s ===
General election 20 September 1780: Norfolk (2 seats)
Party	Candidate	Votes	%	±%
Nonpartisan	Edward Astley	Unopposed	N/A	N/A
Nonpartisan	Thomas Coke	Unopposed	N/A	N/A

General election 14 April 1784: Norfolk (2 seats)
Party	Candidate	Votes	%	±%
Nonpartisan	Edward Astley	Unopposed	N/A	N/A
Nonpartisan	John Wodehouse	Unopposed	N/A	N/A

=== Elections in the 1790s ===
General election 1790: Norfolk (2 seats)
Party	Candidate	Votes	%	±%
Nonpartisan	John Wodehouse	Unopposed	N/A	N/A
Nonpartisan	Thomas Coke	Unopposed	N/A	N/A

General election 1796: Norfolk (2 seats)
Party	Candidate	Votes	%	±%
Nonpartisan	John Wodehouse	Unopposed	N/A	N/A
Nonpartisan	Thomas Coke	Unopposed	N/A	N/A

=== Elections in the 1800s ===
- Creation of Wodehouse as 1st Baron Wodehouse

By-Election November 1801: Norfolk
Party	Candidate	Votes	%	±%
Nonpartisan	Jacob Henry Astley	Unopposed	N/A	N/A
Nonpartisan hold				

General election 1802: Norfolk (2 seats)
Party	Candidate	Votes	%	±%
Whig	Thomas Coke	4,317	37.72	New
Whig	Jacob Henry Astley	3,612	31.56	N/A
Tory	John Wodehouse	3,517	30.73	New
Majority		95	0.83	N/A
Turnout		11,446 (7,251 voted)	N/A	N/A
Whig gain from Nonpartisan		Swing		
Whig gain from Nonpartisan		Swing		

- Note (1802): Stooks Smith records that the polls were open for eight days

General election 1806: Norfolk (2 seats)
Party	Candidate	Votes	%	±%
Whig	Thomas Coke	4,118	36.59	−1.13
Whig	William Windham	3,772	33.51	N/A
Tory	John Wodehouse	3,365	29.90	−0.83
Majority		107	3.61	+2.78
Turnout		11,255	N/A	N/A
Whig hold		Swing		
Whig hold		Swing		

- Note (1806): Stooks Smith records that the polls were open for six days
- Election declared void

By-Election March 1807: Norfolk (2 seats)
Party	Candidate	Votes	%	±%
Whig	Jacob Henry Astley	Unopposed	N/A	N/A
Whig	Edward Coke	Unopposed	N/A	N/A

General election 1807: Norfolk (2 seats)
Party	Candidate	Votes	%	±%
Whig	Thomas Coke	Unopposed	N/A	N/A
Whig	Jacob Henry Astley	Unopposed	N/A	N/A

=== Elections in the 1810s ===
General election 1812: Norfolk (2 seats)
Party	Candidate	Votes	%	±%
Whig	Thomas Coke	Unopposed	N/A	N/A
Whig	Jacob Henry Astley	Unopposed	N/A	N/A

- Death of Astley

By-Election May 1817: Norfolk
Party	Candidate	Votes	%	±%
Tory	Edmond Wodehouse	3,861	54.00	New
Whig	Edward Roger Pratt	3,289	46.00	N/A
Majority		572	8.00	N/A
Turnout		7,150	N/A	N/A
Tory gain from Whig				

- Note (1817): Stooks Smith records that the polls were open for five days.

General election 1818: Norfolk (2 seats)
Party	Candidate	Votes	%	±%
Whig	Thomas Coke	Unopposed	N/A	N/A
Tory	Edmond Wodehouse	Unopposed	N/A	N/A

=== Elections in the 1820s ===
General election 1820: Norfolk (2 seats)
Party	Candidate	Votes	%	±%
Whig	Thomas Coke	Unopposed	N/A	N/A
Tory	Edmond Wodehouse	Unopposed	N/A	N/A

General election 1826: Norfolk (2 seats)
Party	Candidate	Votes	%	±%
Whig	Thomas Coke	Unopposed	N/A	N/A
Tory	Edmond Wodehouse	Unopposed	N/A	N/A

=== Elections in the 1830s ===
General election 1830: Norfolk (2 seats)
Party	Candidate	Votes	%	±%
Whig	Thomas Coke	Unopposed	N/A	N/A
Whig	William ffolkes	Unopposed	N/A	N/A

General election 1831: Norfolk (2 seats)
Party	Candidate	Votes	%	±%
Whig	Thomas Coke	Unopposed	N/A	N/A
Whig	William ffolkes	Unopposed	N/A	N/A

- Constituency divided following the Reform Act 1832, with effect from the 1832 United Kingdom general election.

== See also ==
- List of former United Kingdom Parliament constituencies

== Notes and references ==
=== Bibliography ===
- Robert Beatson, A Chronological Register of Both Houses of Parliament (London: Longman, Hurst, Res & Orme, 1807)
- D. Brunton & D. H. Pennington, Members of the Long Parliament (London: George Allen & Unwin, 1954)
- John Cannon, Parliamentary Reform 1640–1832 (Cambridge: Cambridge University Press, 1972)
- Cobbett's Parliamentary history of England, from the Norman Conquest in 1066 to the year 1803 (London: Thomas Hansard, 1808)
- Maija Jansson (ed.), Proceedings in Parliament, 1614 (House of Commons) (Philadelphia: American Philosophical Society, 1988)
- Lewis Namier & John Brooke, The History of Parliament: The House of Commons 1754–1790 (London: HMSO, 1964)
- J. E. Neale, The Elizabethan House of Commons (London: Jonathan Cape, 1949)
- T. H. B. Oldfield, The Representative History of Great Britain and Ireland (London: Baldwin, Cradock & Joy, 1816)
- J Holladay Philbin, Parliamentary Representation 1832 – England and Wales (New Haven: Yale University Press, 1965)
- Romney Sedgwick, The House of Commons 1715–1754 (London: HMSO, 1970)
- M Stenton (ed.), Who's Who of British Members of Parliament: Volume I 1832–1885 (Harvester Press, 1976)
- M Stenton (ed.), Who's Who of British Members of Parliament, Volume II 1886–1918 (Harvester Press, 1978)
- Henry Stooks Smith, The Parliaments of England from 1715 to 1847 (2nd edition, edited by FWS Craig – Chichester: Parliamentary Reference Publications, 1973)
- Leigh Rayment's Historical List of MPs – Constituencies beginning with "N" (part 2)
