= Edmund Noon =

English politician (died 1413)

Sir Edmund Noon (died 1413) was an English politician who sat as MP for Norfolk in 1406. He was knighted before February 1386.

He was probably the son of Edmund Noon. He married his first wife and had one son whom predeceased him. Between September 1377 and March 1382, he married Isabel (died 1406), the daughter of Sir Thomas Visdelou (died 1375) and widow of Sir John Verdon and they had one son and one daughter.
