= Thomas de Grey (1717–1781) =

British politician and militia officer (1717–1781)

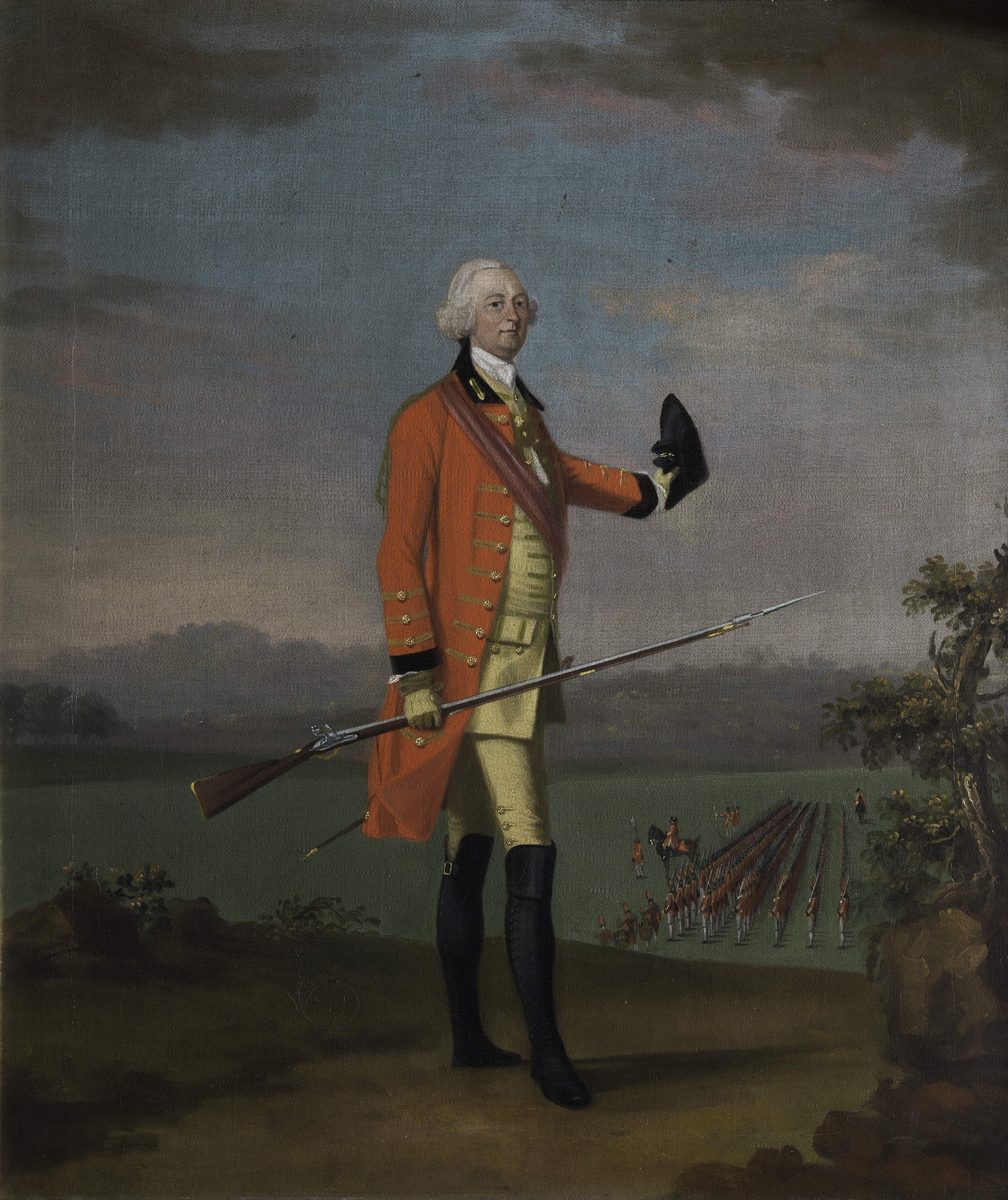
- Portrait by David Morier, c. 1758
- Born: c. 1717; England
- Died: 23 June 1781; England

Thomas de Grey (c. 1717 – 23 June 1781) was a British politician and militia officer.

== Life ==
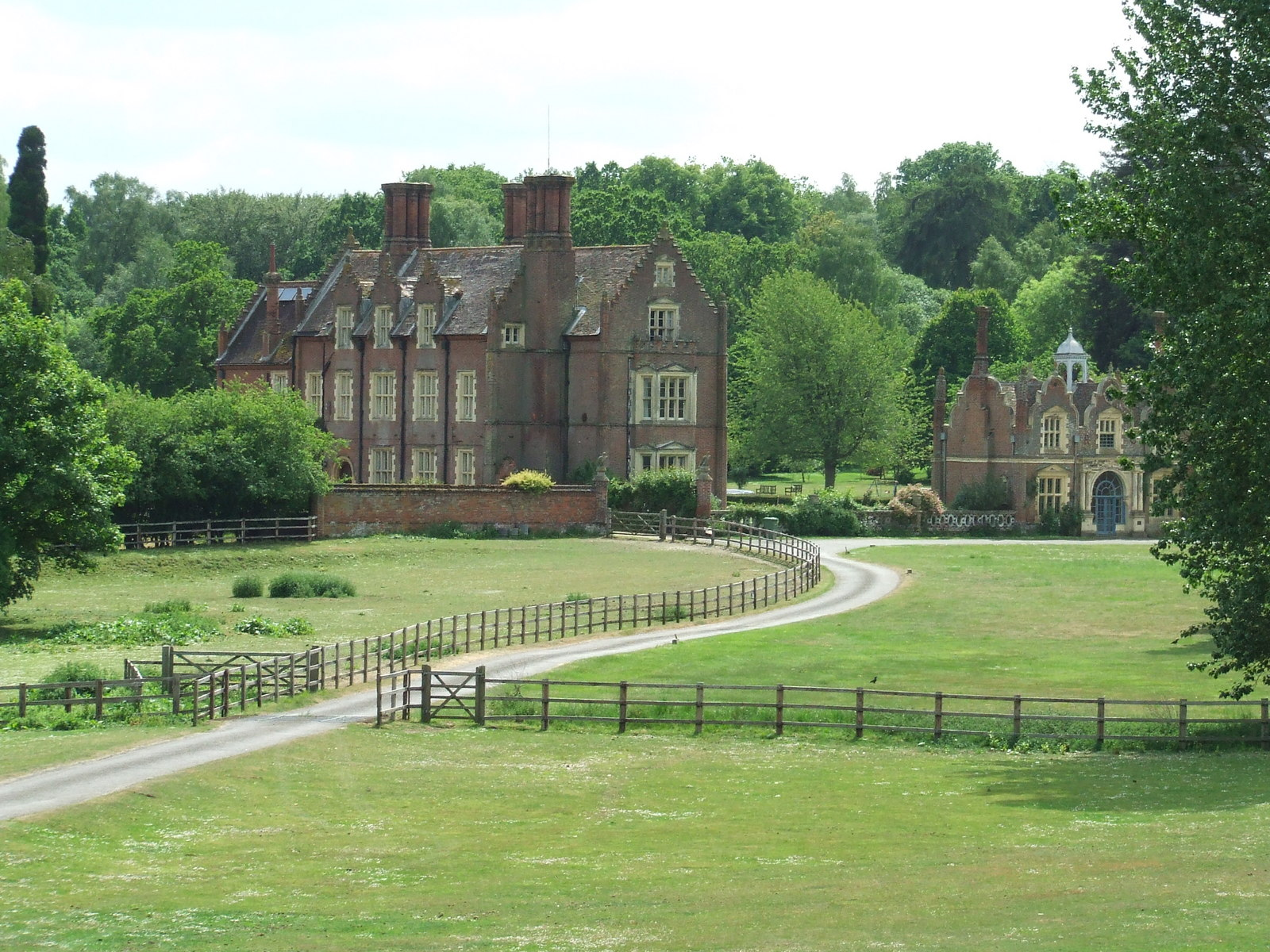
Merton hall, Norfolk

He was the eldest surviving son of Thomas de Grey and Elizabeth Windham, daughter of William Windham of Felbrigg. His brother William de Grey also became an MP. Thomas junior was baptised on 29 September 1717 and attended school in Bury St Edmunds before going up to Christ's College, Cambridge in 1735. In 1746 he married Elizabeth Fisher, daughter of Samuel Fisher of Bury St Edmunds — this brought him a considerable estate. In 1765 he also inherited Merton Hall on his father's death.

One of the seats for the constituency of Norfolk fell vacant in 1764 when George Townshend succeeded to his father's viscountcy. He recommended that de Grey succeed him and with backing from Townshend's family and the Walpole family he was returned unopposed. He voted against repealing the Stamp Act in 1766 and against administration on the land tax in 1767, before being returned again for Norfolk in 1768 after a very costly campaign. In 1772 he spoke in favour of the Royal Marriages Act but he became more and more affected by gout and so before the next general election in 1773 decided not to stand again.

He died in 1781, leaving no children. Merton Hall passed to his nephew, Thomas de Grey, 2nd Baron Walsingham, son of his brother William.

Parliament of Great Britain
Preceded by Sir Armine Wodehouse; George Townshend	Member of Parliament for Norfolk; 1764–1774; With: Sir Armine Wodehouse 1764–1768; Sir Edward Astley 1768–1774	Succeeded by Sir Edward Astley; Wenman Coke
