= Sir Edmund Bacon, 6th Baronet, of Redgrave =

British politician

Arms of Bacon: Gules, on a chief argent two mullets pierced sable

Sir Edmund Bacon, 6th Baronet (c. 1680 or 1686 – 30 April 1755), of Garboldisham, Norfolk, was a British politician who sat in the House of Commons between 1710 and 1741.

== Life ==
Bacon was the eldest son of Sir Robert Bacon, 5th Baronet and his wife Elizabeth Chandler, daughter of Daniel Chandler. He was admitted at Pembroke College, Cambridge on 5 May 1697. Bacon succeeded his father as baronet in 1704.

In 1710, Bacon stood as Member of Parliament (MP) for Thetford, a seat he held until 1713. He then represented Norfolk from 1713 until 1715, and again from 1728 until 1741.

On 27 November 1712, Bacon married Mary Kemp, daughter of Sir Robert Kemp, 3rd Baronet at Ubbeston in Suffolk. They had four daughters, but no sons and so with his death the baronetcy devolved to a descendant of Sir Butts Bacon, 1st Baronet, of Mildenhall, third son of Sir Nicholas Bacon, 1st Baronet, of Redgrave, thus uniting both creations.

Parliament of Great Britain
Preceded by Sir Thomas Hanmer; Dudley North	Member of Parliament for Thetford; 1710–1713; With: Dudley North	Succeeded by Sir William Barker; Dudley North
Preceded by Sir John Wodehouse; Sir Jacob Astley	Member of Parliament for Norfolk; 1713–1715; With: Sir Jacob Astley	Succeeded by Thomas de Grey; Sir Jacob Astley
Preceded by Sir John Hobart; Sir Thomas Coke	Member of Parliament for Norfolk; 1728–1741; With: Harbord Harbord 1728–1734; William Wodehouse 1734–1737; Armine Wodehouse 1737–1741	Succeeded by Armine Wodehouse; Viscount Coke
Baronetage of England
Preceded by Edmund Bacon	Baronet (of Redgrave); 1704–1755	Succeeded by Richard Bacon
