= John Lancaster (died 1424) =

John Lancaster (died 1424), of Bressingham, Norfolk, was an English Member of Parliament (MP).

He was a Member of the Parliament of England for Suffolk in 1407, 1410, 1411, and May 1413, and for Norfolk in 1419, May 1421, December 1421 and 1422.
