= Edmund Soame =

English soldier & politician (c.1669–1706)

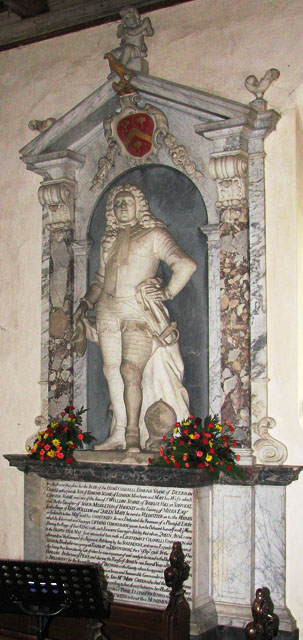
Memorial to Edmund Soame in St Andrews, West Dereham

Edmund Soame (c. 1669 – 8 September 1706) was an English soldier and politician. He served in the English Army where he attained the rank of colonel, and was member of Parliament for Thetford from 1701 to 1705.

== Death ==
Soame died on board a ship at Torbay on 8 Sept. 1706, aged 37. Laurence Hyde, 1st Earl of Rochester wrote to Robert Harley, 1st Earl of Oxford and Earl Mortimer, ‘I am very much concerned for the death of Colonel Soame, both on your account, and the interest I had myself in him’. The monument erected in West Dereham parish church noted that he had ‘dedicated the revenues of a plentiful estate’ to serving his country, and had proved himself ‘to be as true and brave a patriot in the senate house, as he was a brave and honourable commander in the field’.

Parliament of Great Britain
Preceded by Charles Paston, Lord Paston; James Sloane	Member of Parliament for Thetford; 1701–1705; With: Sir Thomas Hanmer; Sir Joseph Williamson	Succeeded by Sir Thomas Hanmer; Sir John Wodehouse
