= Edward Coke, Viscount Coke =

British Member of Parliament

The Viscount Coke
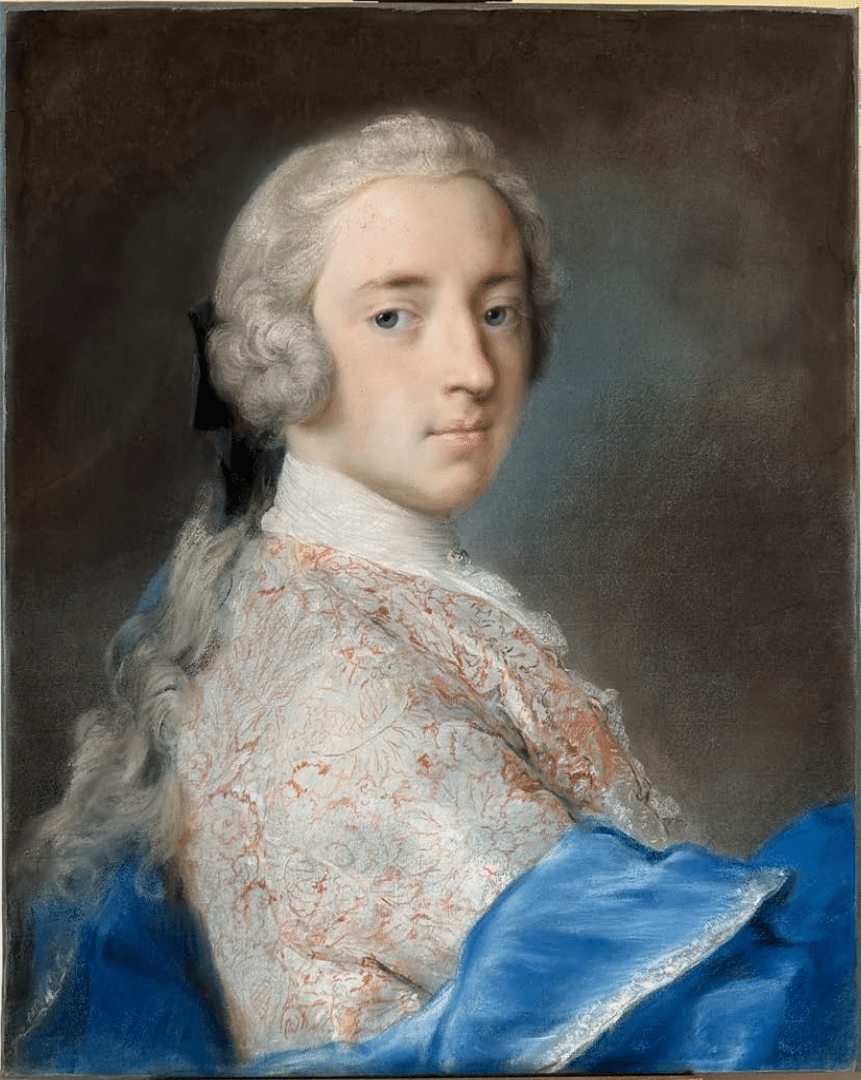
- Portrait of Viscount Coke by Rosalba Carriera
- Born: The Hon. Edward Coke; 2 February 1719
- Died: 31 August 1753 (aged 34)
- Spouse: Lady Mary Coke
- Parents: Thomas Coke, 1st Earl of Leicester; Lady Margaret Tufton

Edward Coke, Viscount Coke (2 February 1719 – 31 August 1753), styled The Hon. Edward Coke from 1728 to 1744, was a British Member of Parliament. He represented Norfolk in Parliament from 1741 to 1747 and Harwich from 1747 to his death.

He was the only child and heir of Thomas Coke, 1st Earl of Leicester, and his wife Margaret Coke, 19th Baroness de Clifford. The family estate was at Holkham Hall, Norfolk.

== Marriage ==
He was married on 1 April 1747 to Lady Mary Campbell (6 February 1727 – 30 September 1811), the fifth and youngest daughter of the soldier and politician John Campbell, 2nd Duke of Argyll (1680–1743), and his second wife, Jane (c.1683–1767), a maid of honour to Queen Anne and Caroline, Princess of Wales. Their courtship had been strained, and in retaliation Edward left her alone on their wedding night and from then on virtually imprisoned her. She reacted by refusing to have sex with him. She never used the title Viscountess Coke.

Their families went to litigation, and eventually produced a settlement in 1750 whereby Lady Mary could live with her mother at Sudbrook but had to remain married to Edward until his death.

He died in 1753, when Mary was 26, predeceasing his father. They had no children and the earldom thus became extinct when his father died in 1759. His father's estate, including Holkham Hall, went instead to Edward's cousin. Lady Mary never remarried.

== Ancestry ==
Ancestors of Edward Coke, Viscount Coke

16. Richard Coke (grandson of Sir Edward Coke)
8. Robert Coke
17. Mary Rous
4. Edward Coke
18. Thomas Osborne, 1st Duke of Leeds
9. Lady Anne Osborne
19. Bridget Bertie
2. Thomas Coke, 1st Earl of Leicester
20. Sir John Newton, 2nd Baronet
10. Sir John Newton, 3rd Baronet
21. Mary Eyre
5. Carey Newton
22. William Heveningham
11. Abigail Heveningham
23. Mary Carey
1. Edward Coke, Viscount Coke
24. Nicholas Tufton, 1st Earl of Thanet
12. John Tufton, 2nd Earl of Thanet
25. Frances Cecil
6. Thomas Tufton, 6th Earl of Thanet
26. Richard Sackville, 3rd Earl of Dorset
13. Lady Margaret Sackville
27. Lady Anne Clifford, 14th Baroness de Clifford
3. Lady Margaret Tufton
28. William Cavendish, 1st Duke of Newcastle-upon-Tyne
14. Henry Cavendish, 2nd Duke of Newcastle-upon-Tyne
29. Elizabeth Basset
7. Lady Catherine Cavendish
30. William Pierrepont
15. Frances Pierrepoint
31. Elizabeth Harries

== Sources ==
- https://web.archive.org/web/20120301185712/http://www.cracroftspeerage.co.uk/online/content/index1369.htm
- https://web.archive.org/web/20181006224549/http://www.leighrayment.com/commons/Ncommons2.htm
- https://web.archive.org/web/20091220042104/http://www.leighrayment.com/commons/Hcommons1.htm
- http://www.historyofparliamentonline.org/volume/1715-1754/member/coke-hon-edward-1719-53

Parliament of Great Britain
Preceded by Sir Edmund Bacon, Bt; Armine Wodehouse	Member of Parliament for Norfolk; 1741–1747; With: Armine Wodehouse	Succeeded by Armine Wodehouse; Hon. George Townshend
Preceded by Hill Mussenden; John Phillipson	Member of Parliament for Harwich; 1747–1753; With: John Phillipson	Succeeded by John Phillipson; Wenman Coke
