= Robert Berney =

English politician (died 1415)

Sir Robert Berney (before 1365 – 1415) was an English soldier and politician. He sat as MP for Norfolk in November 1390, 1391, 1395, 1399, 1402, and April 1414.

He was knighted before March 1389.

== Political career ==
He also served as commissioner of array in Norfolk in April 1385, March 1392, December 1399, in Kent in August and November 1403, July 1405; commissioner of inquiry in Norfolk in February 1395 concerning petition from the men of the hundred of Mitford, in April 1409 concerning assault; commissioner of gaol delivery in Norwich castle in November 1396; commissioner to hold special assizes in Norfolk in February 1397; commissioner to supervise musters in Kent in April and May 1405.

He also served as justice of the peace for Norfolk from 10 November 1389 till July 1397, 28 November 1399 till March 1401, 10 March 1410 till his death, in Kent from 18 May 1400 till February 1406; steward of the Duchy of Lancaster manor of Gimingham in Norfolk from Michaelmas 1398 till 1399; deputy to Sir Thomas Erpingham as constable of Dover castle and warden of the Cinque Ports from c. May 1400 till after March 1406; escheator of Kent and Middlesex from 12 November 1403 till 1 February 1404; and Sheriff of Norfolk and Suffolk from 5 November 1406 till 30 November 1407, and 29 November 1410 till 10 December 1411.

== Family ==
He was the son of John Berney (died 1374) by his second wife Joan who was possibly the daughter of Bartholomew Witchingham. Before June 1382, he married Margaret, the daughter and co-heiress of Sir Walter Walcot and they had one son. After 1401, he married Margaret (died September 1416), who was possibly the daughter of an Appleyard of Norwich, she was the widow of Roger Welsham (died 1401) and they had one son and one daughter.
