= Thomas Tuddenham =

Sir Thomas Tuddenham
- Born: 10 May 1401; Eriswell, Suffolk
- Died: 23 February 1462 (aged 60); Tower Hill, London
- Buried: Austin Friars, London
- Spouse: Alice Wodehouse
- Father: Sir Robert Tuddenham

Sir Thomas Tuddenham (10 May 1401 – 23 February 1462) was an influential Norfolk landowner, official and courtier. He served as Steward of the Duchy of Lancaster, and Keeper of the Great Wardrobe. During the Wars of the Roses he allied himself with the Lancastrian side, and after the Yorkist victory in 1461 was charged with treason and beheaded on Tower Hill on 23 February 1462.

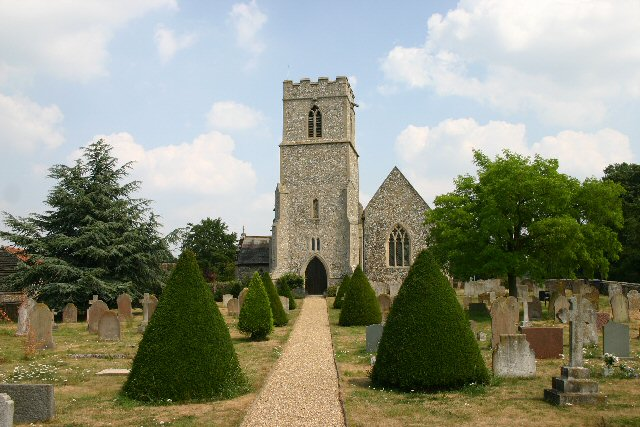
Parish church at Eriswell, Suffolk, where Sir Thomas Tuddenham was baptised

== Family ==
Thomas Tuddenham, born 10 May 1401 at Eriswell, Suffolk, and baptised in the parish church there, was the younger son of Sir Robert Tuddenham (1366–1405) and Margaret Harling, the daughter of John Harling, esquire.

== Career ==
His elder brother, Robert, died in 1415, at which time Tuddenham inherited the family estates. However, as he was still underage his wardship and marriage fell to the Crown, and in July 1417 were granted to Sir John Rodenhale and John Wodehouse, esquire. Tuddenham married Wodehouse's daughter in about 1418, and was granted livery of his lands in March 1423.

On 30 June 1425 Wodehouse surrendered his office of steward of the Duchy of Lancaster in order that it could be granted to his son-in-law. Tuddenham was also knighted about this time, and perhaps through his father-in-law's influence entered the service of Thomas Beaufort, Duke of Exeter. His landholdings in Norfolk were augmented in 1434 when he inherited the manor of Oxburgh from a cousin.

After Exeter's death in 1426, Tuddenham aligned himself with William de la Pole, 1st Duke of Suffolk (1396–1450), Exeter's successor as the leading nobleman in Norfolk. As an ally of Suffolk, Tuddenham was the recipient of numerous appointments and grants in East Anglia and in the household of Henry VI. He was Sheriff of Norfolk and Suffolk in 1432, and Member of Parliament for Suffolk in 1431, and for Norfolk in 1432, 1435 and 1442. On 29 September 1443 he and Suffolk were jointly appointed to the chief stewardship of the north parts of the Duchy of Lancaster. On 26 October 1446 Tuddenham was appointed Keeper of the Great Wardrobe in the royal household.

In 1449–50 Tuddenham funded a visit to Rome in the Holy Year by the theologian and historian John Capgrave, who subsequently wrote his The Solace of Pilgrimes; A Description of Rome for Tuddenham.

Suffolk fell from power in 1450, and according to Ross, "The primary theme of the Paston Letters in the early 1450s is the attempt to bring Suffolk's East Anglian affinity to justice, at least as John Paston and his circle viewed it, and in particular Sir Thomas Tuddenham and John Heydon" of Baconsthorpe. Tuddenham lost his offices of Justice of the Peace in Norfolk, Keeper of the Great Wardrobe, and Steward of the north parts of the Duchy of Lancaster, and on 1 August 1450 a general commission of oyer and terminer was issued to the Duke of Norfolk, the Earl of Oxford, Lord Scales, William Yelverton, and members of the Norfolk gentry. The commissioners convicted Tuddenham of more than 300 offences, and on 16 November 1450 fined him £1396; however in the following July, when power at court had been consolidated in the hands of the Duke of Somerset, Tuddenham was remitted all but £200 of the fine, and many of the charges against him were later dismissed. By 1457–8 some sort of rapprochement had been reached between Tuddenham and Oxford, and the Earl had granted Tuddenham an annuity of £10 per annum. Nevertheless, Tuddenham and Heydon's political influence "never again reached the same heights it had done in the 1440s", and it was not until March 1455 that both men were reinstated as Justices of the Peace in Norfolk.

During the Wars of the Roses in the 1450s Tuddenham and his associates aligned themselves with the Lancastrian forces of Margaret of Anjou, wife of Henry VI, and at the end of 1458 Tuddenham was appointed Treasurer of the Royal Household.

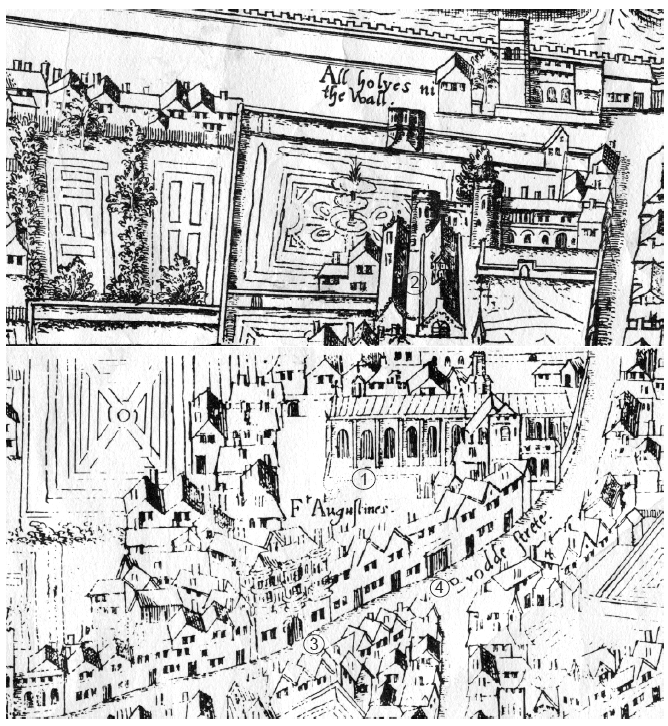
Depiction of Austin Friars, London, burial place of Sir Thomas Tuddenham, circa 1550

Edward IV came to the throne after the Yorkist victory at the Battle of Towton on 29 March 1461, and shortly thereafter an order for Tuddenham's arrest was issued, and his estates were confiscated. In February 1462 Tuddenham was allegedly involved in a plot to murder the King. He was arrested, and "at Edward IV's bidding" was tried and sentenced to death for High Treason by John Tiptoft, 1st Earl of Worcester, together with the Earl of Oxford, the Earl's eldest son and heir, Aubrey de Vere, John Montgomery, and William Tyrrell of Gipping, Suffolk. Sources differ as to the way in which the King discovered the alleged conspiracy; one account claims that Aubrey de Vere revealed the plot to the King, while another states that letters sent from the Earl to Margaret of Anjou were instead taken to the King by the Earl's messenger. No records survive of the trials of the various conspirators to shed light on the subject. Just one of the alleged conspirators, John Clopton, was spared and pardoned.

The executions were recorded in several chronicles of the period, one of which contained the following account:

And the 12th day of February the Earl of Oxenford and the Lord Aubrey Vere, his son, Sir Thomas Tuddenham, William Tyrrell and other were brought into the Tower of London. And upon the 20th day of the said month the said Lord Aubrey was drawn from Westminster to the Tower Hill, and there beheaded. And the 23rd day of the said month of February Sir Thomas Tuddenham, William Tyrrell, and John Montgomery were beheaded at said Tower Hill. And upon the Friday next following, which was the 26th day of February, the Earl of Oxenford was led upon foot from Westminster unto the Tower Hill, and there beheaded, and after the corpse was had unto the Friar Augustines, and there buried in the choir.

Tuddenham, too, was buried in the church of the Austin Friars in London. His lands, including his manor of Oxburgh, were inherited by his sister, Margaret Tuddenham, who had married Edmund Bedingfield, Esquire.

== Marriage and issue ==
Tuddenham married, about 1418, Alice Wodehouse, the daughter of his guardian, John Wodehouse. The couple lived together until about 1425, during which time Alice gave birth to a son who died young. Both Tuddenham and his wife later denied that the marriage had been consummated, and Alice admitted that her father's chamberlain was the father of her infant son. By 1429, Tuddenham and his wife were formally separated, and Alice became a nun at Crabhouse Priory in Norfolk. The marriage was annulled on 22 November 1436.
