= Thomas Coke, 1st Earl of Leicester (fifth creation) =

British landowner and politician

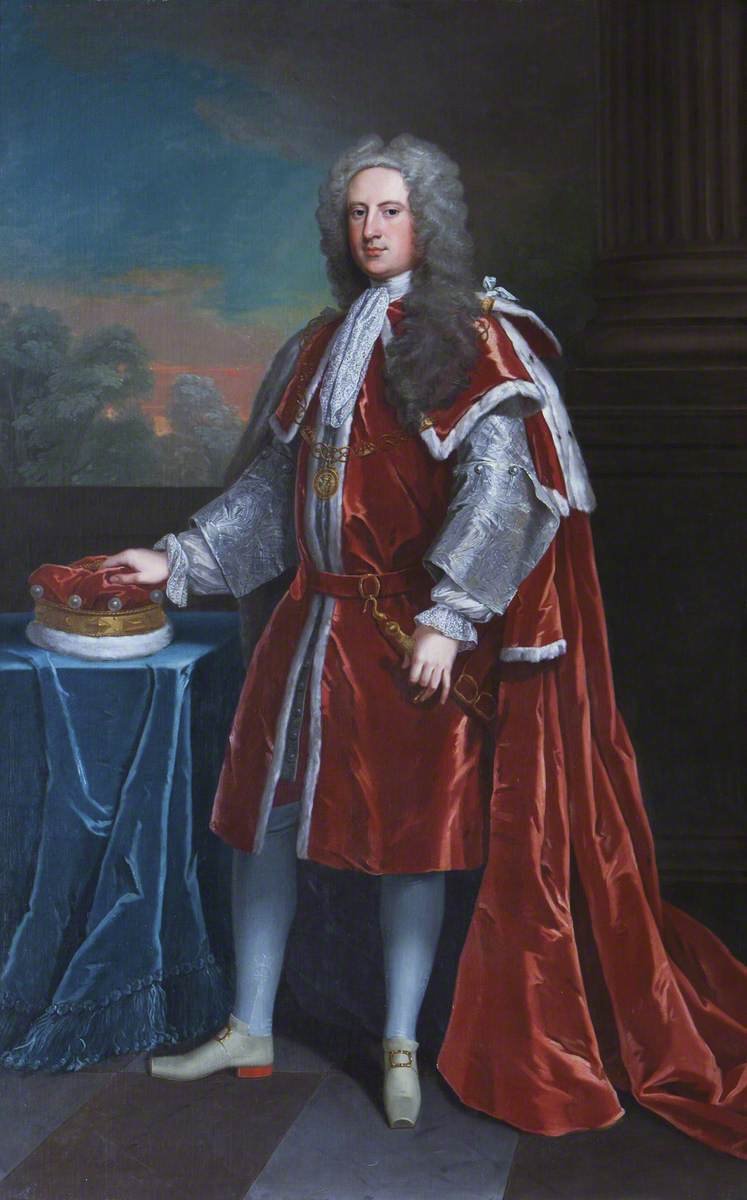
The Earl of Leicester depicted with his baron's coronet

Arms of Coke, Earls of Leicester: Per pale gules and azure, three eagles displayed argent

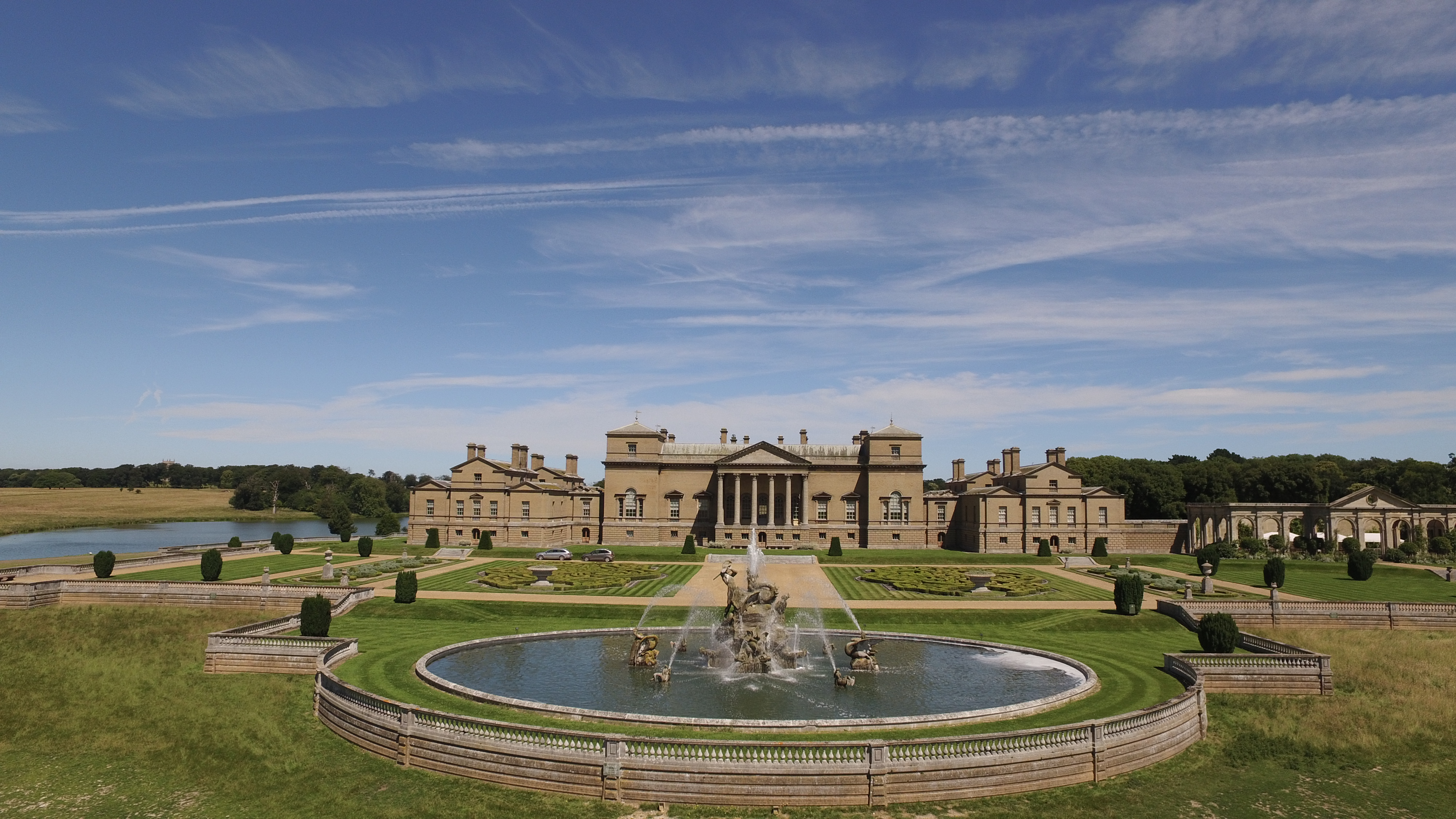
Holkham Hall, Norfolk

Thomas Coke, 1st Earl of Leicester, KB (17 June 1697 – 20 April 1759) was a British landowner and politician. He is particularly noted for commissioning the design and construction of Holkham Hall in north Norfolk. Between 1722 and 1728, he was one of the two Members of Parliament for Norfolk. He was honoured by being created first Earl of Leicester, in a recreation of an ancient earldom.

== Life ==
He was the son of Edward Coke (Coke is pronounced "Cook") and Cary Newton. His great-great-great-grandfather was the noted judge and politician Sir Edward Coke. He was also the great-grandson of his namesake, Thomas Osborne, 1st Duke of Leeds. He married Lady Margaret Tufton, 19th Baroness de Clifford, 3rd daughter of Thomas Tufton, 6th Earl of Thanet by his wife Lady Catherine Cavendish. The title of "19th Baroness de Clifford" was eventually granted in favour to her after falling into abeyance between her co-heir sisters. As a young man, Coke embarked on a six-year 'Grand Tour', returning to England in the spring of 1718. During his time in Rome in 1715, he made the acquaintance of Richard Boyle, 3rd Earl of Burlington, the aristocratic architect at the forefront of the Palladian revival movement in England, and of William Kent. Both were later to be engaged by Coke to work on his mansion at Holkham Hall constructed in Palladian style which housed the considerable collection of works of art that Coke had accumulated on his travels. During these travels in 1717, he purchased the Codex Leicester, containing some of the works of Leonardo da Vinci, the Italian artist and scientist.

Coke was later raised to the peerage as Baron Lovel and became known as Lord Lovel on 28 May 1728. However, Coke was badly affected by financial losses when his investments in the South Sea Company proved worthless. This delayed the building of Coke's planned new country estate for over ten years. On top of that, he seemed to have lived a reckless life of drinking, gambling, and hunting, as well as being a leading supporter of cock fighting. It was not until around 1732 that Burlington and Kent made their first drawings for the new country house. Norfolk architect Matthew Brettingham was also influential in the design of the mansion (though he attributed the design of the Marble Hall to Coke himself). Work on the foundations began in 1734, but it was to be 30 years before work was completed. As he surveyed the result of his long years of labour and achievement, Lord Leicester lamented: "It is a melancholy thing to stand alone in one's own country. I look around not a house to be seen but my own. I am Giant of Giant Castle and have ate up all my neighbours my nearest neighbour is the King of Denmark."

Coke, who had been made Earl of Leicester on 9 May 1744, died on 20 April 1759, five years before the completion of Holkham Hall, having never fully recovered his financial losses. Thereafter, his wife Lady Margaret oversaw the completion and furnishing of the house. He had been predeceased by his only son, Edward Coke, Viscount Coke (1719–1753), whose marriage to the diarist Lady Mary Campbell proved disastrous – he virtually imprisoned her at Holkham Hall – and childless. Therefore, Holkham Hall was inherited by Thomas Coke's nephew Wenman Roberts, the son of Major Philip Roberts and Thomas's sister Anne Coke.

Wenman took the name of Coke after inheriting the Coke estates and was succeeded on his death in 1776 by his son, another Thomas Coke, later 1st Earl of Leicester of Holkham, the MP and agricultural reformer.

== See also ==
- Minster Lovell Hall

Parliament of Great Britain
Preceded by Sir Jacob Astley; Thomas de Grey	Member of Parliament for Norfolk; 1722–1728; With: Thomas de Grey 1722–1727; Sir John Hobart 1727–1728	Succeeded by Harbord Harbord; Sir Edmund Bacon
Political offices
Preceded by Edward Harrison; Edward Carteret	Postmaster General of the United Kingdom; 1733–1759; With: Edward Carteret 1733–1739; Sir John Eyles 1739–1745; Everard Fawkener 1745–1759	Succeeded by Lord Trevor; The Earl of Bessborough
Masonic offices
Preceded by The Duke of Norfolk	Grand Master of the Premier; Grand Lodge of England; 1731–1732	Succeeded by The Viscount Montagu
Peerage of Great Britain
New creation	Earl of Leicester; 1744–1759	Extinct
New creation	Baron Lovel; 1728–1759	Extinct
