= Sir John Wodehouse, 4th Baronet =

British Tory Member of Parliament

Sir John Wodehouse, 4th Baronet (23 March 1669 – 6 August 1754), was a British Tory Member of Parliament.

A member of an old Norfolk family, Wodehouse succeeded his grandfather Sir Philip Wodehouse, 3rd Baronet, in the baronetcy on 6 May 1681. He was the son of Thomas Wodehouse and Anne Armine, daughter and co-heiress of Sir William Armine, 2nd Baronet. In 1695 he was elected to the House of Commons for Thetford, a seat he held until 1698 and again from 1701 to 1702 and 1705 to 1708. He also represented Norfolk from 1710 to 1713. At some point he was the Recorder of Thetford. Wodehouse married Elizabeth Benson in 1700. After her early death he married Mary Fermor, daughter of William Fermor, 1st Baron Leominster. He died in August 1754, aged 85, and was succeeded in the baronetcy by his son from his second marriage, Armine - another son, William, had predeceased him. Wodehouse's descendants include Foreign Secretary John Wodehouse, 1st Earl of Kimberley, and the author P. G. Wodehouse.

== Notes ==
Parliament of England
Preceded by Sir Francis Guybon; Baptist May	Member of Parliament for Thetford; 1695–1698; With: Sir Joseph Williamson 1695–1696; James Sloane 1696–1698	Succeeded by James Sloane; Sir Joseph Williamson
Preceded by Edmund Soame; Thomas Hanmer	Member of Parliament for Thetford; 1701–1702; With: Sir Thomas Hanmer, Bt.	Succeeded by Robert Benson; Edmund Soame
Parliament of Great Britain
Preceded by Robert Benson; Edmund Soame	Member of Parliament for Thetford; 1705–1708; With: Sir Thomas Hanmer, Bt.	Succeeded by Robert Baylis; Thomas de Grey
Preceded by Sir John Holland, Bt. Ashe Windham	Member of Parliament for Norfolk; 1710–1713; With: Sir Jacob Astley, Bt.	Succeeded by Sir Jacob Astley, Bt. Sir Edmund Bacon, Bt.
Baronetage of England
Preceded by Philip Wodehouse	Baronet of Wilberhall; 1681–1754	Succeeded by Armine Wodehouse
