= Thomas de Grey (1680–1765) =

English landowner and Whig politician

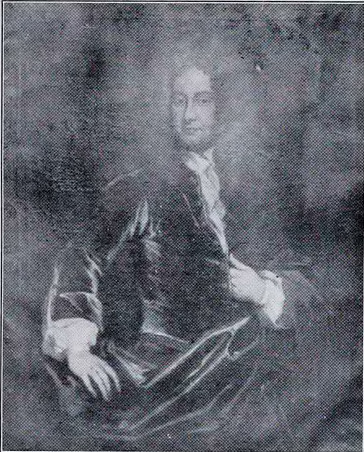
- Born: 1680
- Baptised: 13 August 1680
- Died: December 1765 (aged 84–85)
- Alma mater: St John's College
- Spouse(s): Elizabeth Windham
- Children: William de Grey, 1st Baron Walsingham
- Parent(s): William de Grey; Elizabeth Bedingfeld

Thomas de Grey (1680 – 1765) of Merton, Norfolk, was an English landowner and Whig politician who sat in the House of Commons between 1708 and 1727.

== Early life ==
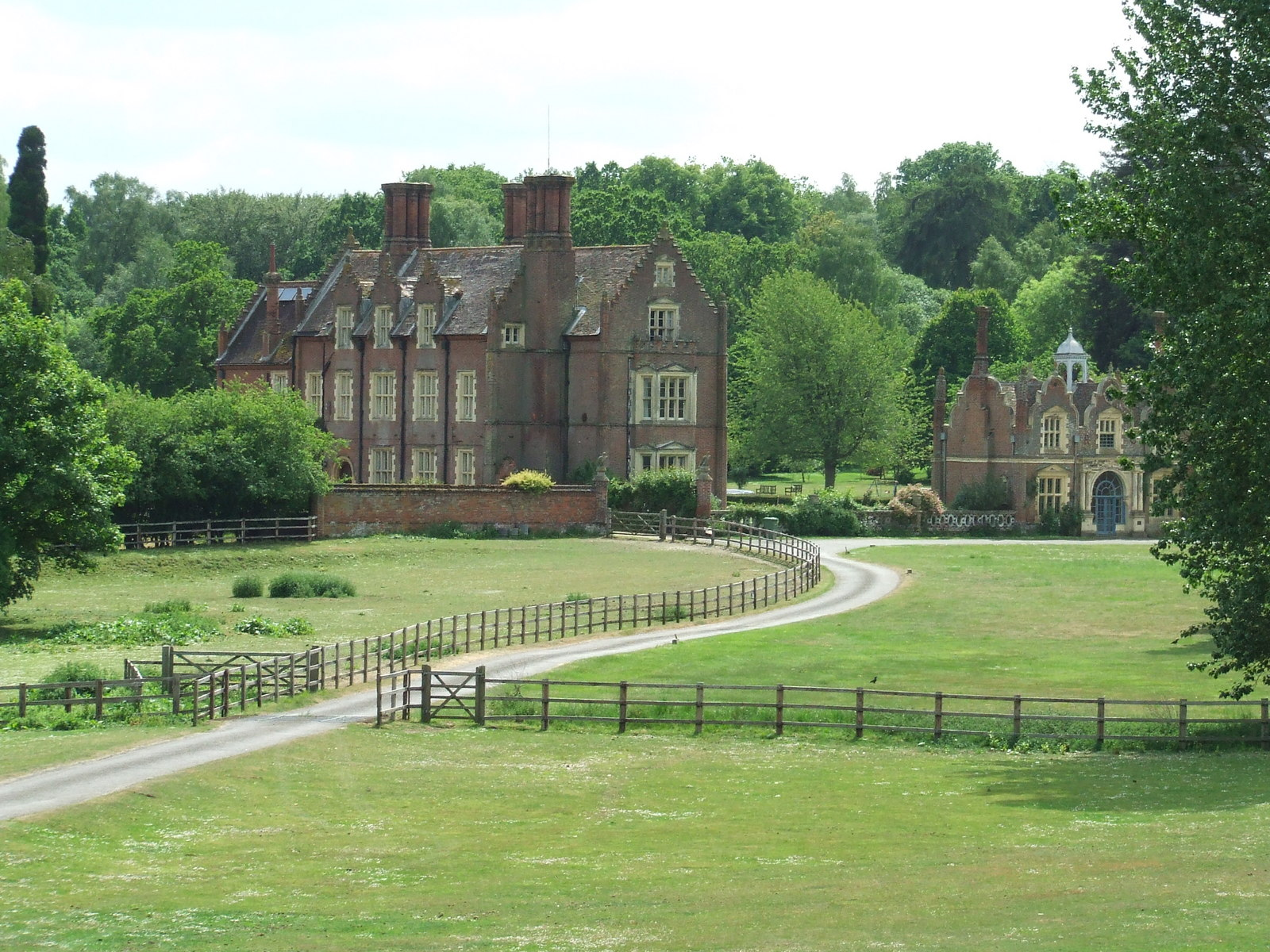
Merton Hall, Norfolk

De Grey was baptised on 13 August 1680, the eldest surviving son of William de Grey and his wife Elizabeth Bedingfield, daughter of Thomas Bedingfield of Darsham. He was educated at Bury St Edmunds Grammar School and was admitted at St John's College, Cambridge on 18 May 1697, aged17. Through a marriage settlement dated 10 September 1706, he married Elizabeth Windham, daughter of William Windham of Felbrigg, Norfolk with £4,500. His marriage brought him into connection with many Norfolk Whig families, although his father was a Tory.

== Career ==
De Grey was returned as Whig Member of Parliament for Thetford at the 1708 British general election. He supported the naturalization of the Palatines in 1709, and voted for the impeachment of Dr Sacheverell in 1710. He did not stand at the 1710 British general election, possibly on grounds of cost, and at the 1713 British general election, declined an invitation by Robert Walpole to stand for Norfolk.

At the 1715 British general election, de Grey was backed by Lord Townshend as a Whig candidate for Norfolk and he won the contest. He voted against the septennial bill of 1716 and joined the opposition (led by Townshend and Robert Walpole) against Lord Cadogan in June 1717. He abstained from the votes on the Peerage Bill and on repealing the Occasional Conformity Act and Schism Act, all in 1719. He did not want to stand again at the 1722 British general election, writing to Townshend asking:

to be discharged of a trust, which after seven years’ experience I am every day more convinced that I am of all persons the most unfit for. It has been my misfortune many times to differ in my opinion from all my friends, and it is another misfortune to me that I can enjoy no peace or quiet in my mind but in acting conformably to it

Townshend did not let him stand down and he won the seat unopposed, but never stood again.

== Death and legacy ==
De Grey died in 1765 and was buried at Merton on 18 December 1765. He had two daughters and two surviving sons, Thomas and William.

Parliament of Great Britain
| Preceded by Sir Thomas Hanmer; Sir John Wodehouse | Member of Parliament for Thetford; 1708–1710; With: Robert Baylis | Succeeded by Sir Thomas Hanmer; Dudley North |
| Preceded by Sir Edmund Bacon; Sir Jacob Astley | Member of Parliament for Norfolk; 1715-1727; With: Sir Jacob Astley, Bt. (to 1722); Sir Thomas Coke (from 1722) | Succeeded by Sir John Hobart, Bt. Sir Thomas Coke |
