= Think of a Number =

2010 novel by John Verdon

- First edition
- Author: John Verdon
- Language: English
- Genre: Detective novel
- Publication date: 2010
- Publication place: United States
- ISBN: 978-0-307-58892-0
- OCLC: 427644829

Think of a Number is the debut novel of John Verdon published in 2010.

It is a detective novel about a retired New York City homicide detective named Dave Gurney.

It is the beginning of a saga that continues with its 2011 follow-up Shut Your Eyes Tight.

In 2012 a third novel in the David Gurney series was published, entitled Let the Devil Sleep.

In 2014 a fourth novel in the David Gurney series was published, entitled Peter Pan Must Die

== See also ==
- 2010 in literature
- Greek edition's page for Think of a Number (Σκέψου έναν Αριθμό)
