= William Wodehouse =

British Tory politician

William Wodehouse (c. 1706 - 13 May 1737), of Kimberley, Norfolk, was a British Tory politician who sat in the House of Commons from 1734 to 1737.

Wodehouse was the eldest son of Sir John Wodehouse, 4th Baronet and his wife Mary Fermor, daughter of Sir William Fermor, 2nd Baronet. He was educated at Wymondham School, under Messrs Sayer and Brett and was admitted at Caius College, Cambridge on 12 June 1723. He married Frances Bathurst, daughter of Allen Bathurst, 1st Earl Bathurst on 5 August 1731.

At the 1734 British general election, Wodehouse was elected Member of Parliament for Norfolk in a close contest. He was also returned as MP for Cirencester on the interest of his father-in-law, but chose to sit for Norfolk.

Wodehouse died, in London on 13 May 1737 from smallpox and was buried at St James Westminster. He had no children, and the baronetcy was eventually inherited by his younger brother Armine, who succeeded him as MP for Norfolk.

Parliament of Great Britain
Preceded by Thomas Master; Peter Bathurst	Member of Parliament for Cirencester; 1734–1735; With: Thomas Master	Succeeded by Thomas Master; Henry Bathurst
Preceded by Edmund Bacon; Harbord Harbord	Member of Parliament for Norfolk; 1734-1737; With: Sir Edmund Bacon, Bt.	Succeeded by Armine Wodehouse; Sir Edmund Bacon, Bt.
