= Harbord Harbord =

East Anglian landowner and Member of Parliament

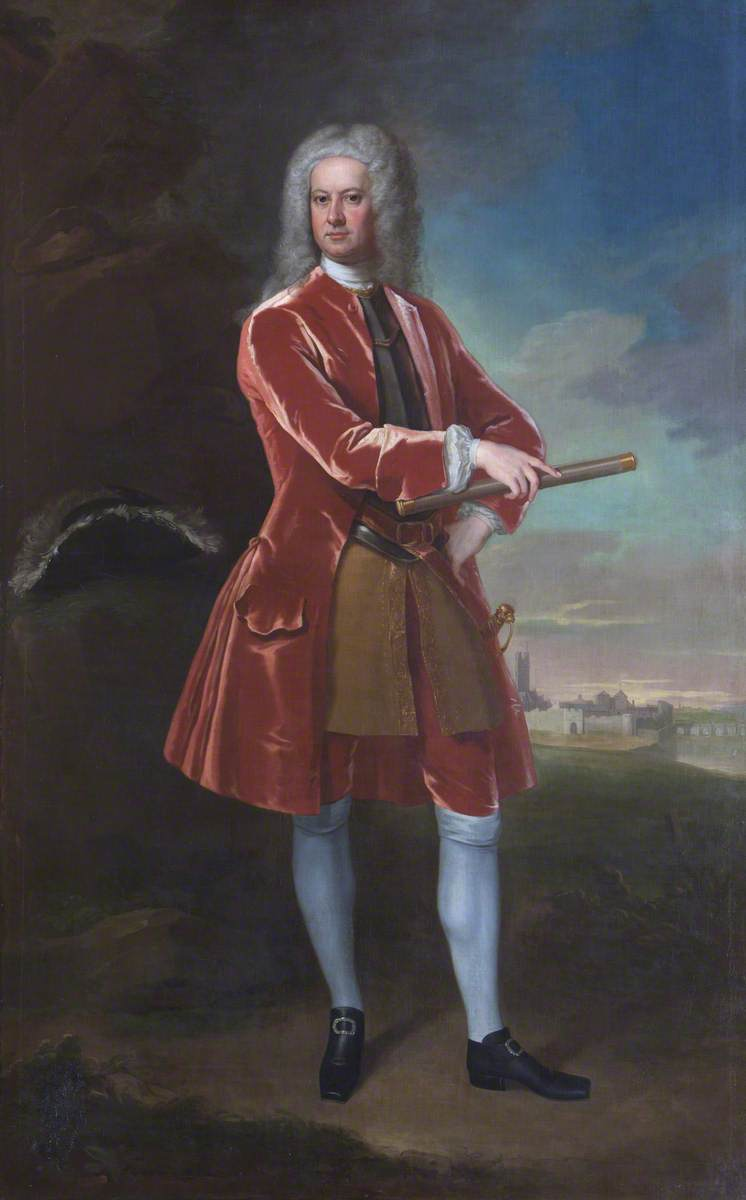
- Portrait of Harbord by William Aikman

Member of Parliament for Norfolk
- In office 1728–1734

Personal details
- Born: Harbord Cropley c.1675
- Died: 28 January 1742

Harbord Harbord (possibly 1675 – 28 January 1742) was an East Anglian landowner and Member of Parliament. He was known as Harbord Cropley from his birth until 1710.

== Life ==
He was the eldest son of Colonel William Cropley of Shelland in Suffolk and his wife Catherine Harbord, daughter of Sir Charles Harbord, surveyor general to Charles I of Great Britain. William was Catherine's second husband, after the death of her first (Thomas Wright of Kilverstone, Norfolk). Sir Charles had bought Stanninghall from the Waldegraves in 1648 and left it to his only son John Harbord, who also acquired Gunton.

Harbord Cropley was educated in Drinkstone and Bury St Edmunds before attending Caius College, Cambridge from 9 May 1694. His mother's brother John Harbord died without heirs in 1710 and left most of his estates to Harbord Cropley, who changed his name to Harbord Harbord. This enabled a minor political career; he was elected for Norfolk in a by-election in 1728, voted for the Excise Bill in 1733, but did not stand for re-election in 1734.

His first wife was Jane Rant, daughter of Sir William Rant of Thorpe Market, Norfolk. She died by 17 May 1737, when he remarried to the widow Rebecca Wrench, daughter of Sir Benjamin Wrench, a doctor from Norwich; Rebecca's first husband had been John Marcon of Norwich. Harbord did not have issue by either wife and so passed his Norfolk properties to William Morden, son of his sister Judith.

Parliament of Great Britain
Preceded by Sir John Hobart, Bt. Sir Thomas Coke	Member of Parliament for Norfolk; 1728-1734; With: Sir Edmund Bacon, Bt.	Succeeded by William Wodehouse; Sir Edmund Bacon, Bt.
