= John Wodehouse (died 1431) =

English politician (died 1431)

Chancellor of the Duchy of Lancaster
- In office 4 April 1413 – 10 June 1424
- Monarchs: Henry V Henry VI
- Preceded by: John Springthorpe
- Succeeded by: William Troutbecke

Chamberlain of the Exchequer
- In office 6 July 1415 – 27 January 1431
- Monarchs: Henry V Henry VI
- Preceded by: John Ikelyngton
- Succeeded by: John Hotoft
Parliamentary offices
Member of Parliament for Suffolk
In office 1422–1427
Preceded by	James Andrew
Succeeded by	Robert Wingfield
Member of Parliament for Norfolk
In office May 1421 – December 1421
Preceded by	Edward Winter
Succeeded by	Edward Winter
In office November 1414 – 1419
Preceded by	John Wynter
Succeeded by	Oliver Groos
In office 1410–1411
Preceded by	Sir Edmund Thorpe
Succeeded by	Sir Edmund Oldhall

Personal details
- Died: 27 January 1431 Roydon, Norfolk, England
- Spouse: Alice Furneaux
- Children: 10
- Relatives: Thomas Tuddenham (son in law)
- Occupation: Administrator; politician

John Wodehouse (died 27 January 1431) was an English administrator and politician who served as Chancellor of the Duchy of Lancaster from 1413 to 1424 and as Chamberlain of the Exchequer from 1415 until his death in 1431. He was an ancestor of the Wodehouse family.

== Background ==
=== Family ===
Wodehouse was believed to be the son of Sir John Wodehouse and Margaret Fastolf, daughter of Sir Thomas Fastolff. Though, 19th century historian Walter Rye disputed this claim. Rye believed that Wodehouse's ancestors were actually a London family who sometimes used the surname Power.

==== Disputed ancestry ====
Wodehouse's disputed descent from Sir Constantine de Wodehouse:

Sir Constantine de Wodehouse
  - Sir George de Wodehouse
    - Sir Henry de Wodehouse
      - Sir Richard de Wodehouse
        - Sir William de Wodehouse
          - Francis de Wodehouse
            - Sir Betram de Wodehouse
              - Sir William de Wodehouse,
                - Sir Richard de Wodehouse
                  - Sir Thomas de Wodehouse
                    - Sir Edward de Wodehouse
                      - Sir John Wodehouse
                        - John Wodehouse

=== Early life ===
Much of his background remains obscure, though Wodehouse is believed to be the first of his name to have any connection with Norfolk. The 17th century suggestions of Wodehouse having distinguished Norfolk ancestry and the Jacobean legend of his valorous conduct at the Battle of Agincourt have been disputed.

It has been suggested that he was the person (of the same name) who was employed by Henry Bolingbroke as a tutor for his sons Thomas and John, who after Henry IV's accession to the throne was rewarded in November 1399 with an annuity of ten marks, and in February 1401, with livery of the Lancastrian SS collar for services to prince Henry.

== Career ==
Wodehouse's career success came largely due to his association with Henry of Monmouth. He was attached to Prince Henry's household as early as Easter 1400, and in 1402 Henry appointed him for life to the offices of constable of his castle of Rising and keeper of the chase there. In 1403, he was made steward of the lordship for life. During the period, he was a member of Henry's personal entourage, and thus saw military action during the Glyndŵr rebellion, and also delivered a report on Prince Henry's movements to the King. In February 1409, Prince Henry gave him the town of Dryslwyn for 20 years which was extended by another 8 years in 1429. He became a Member of Parliament (MP) for Norfolk in 1410.

When Henry of Monmouth acceded to the throne as King Henry V, he appointed Wodehouse Chancellor of the Duchy of Lancaster and an ex officio member of the council on 4 April 1413. In July 1415, he was appointed the Chamberlain of the Exchequer for life. In the summer of 1415, Wodehouse, as an important civil servant, was involved in the military, financial and legal preparations for the resumption of hostilities across the channel. On 22 July 1415, he was made a feoffee of large parts of the duchy estate and made an executor of the King's will which was made two days later. He was also bequeathed a golden cup in the will. Following Henry's early return from France in 1421, Wodehouse attended the coronation of Catherine of Valois, and became her Chancellor in c. February 1421.

Following the death of Henry V in 1422, whom he had served for over 20 years, he was elected as MP for Suffolk.

== Personal life and family ==
Wodehouse married Alice Furneaux and they had five sons and five daughters together. Their daughter, Alice, married MP Thomas Tuddenham.

During his lifetime, Wodehouse invested in eighteen manors: two in Cambridgeshire, four in Suffolk, and twelve in Norfolk. He built a manor-house known as The Rey in Roydon in c. 1400. He made his will on 15 January 1431, which split up his estate between his five sons.

Wodehouse died on 27 January 1431 in his manor house in Roydon. Though some sources have suggested he died in 1430. He was buried in the chantry he had founded in Norwich Cathedral. His widow later married Edmund Wynter, and lived on until 1448.

=== Descendants ===
Through his son, John, Wodehouse was an ancestor of the Wodehouse family.

- John Wodehouse
  - John Wodehouse
    - Edward Wodehouse
      - Sir Thomas Wodehouse KB
        - Sir Roger Wodehouse
          - Thomas Woodhouse
            - Roger Woodhouse
              - Sir Philip Wodehouse, 1st Baronet
