= Stephen Hales (MP for Norfolk) =

Sir Stephen Hales (before 1331 – 1394/5), of Testerton, Norfolk, was an English soldier and politician.

== Biography ==
Hales was born the son and heir of William Hales of Testerton and was knighted at some point before November 1372.

He took part in military campaigns in the wars with France. After being blooded in a sea battle against the Spanish off Winchelsea in 1350, he joined the army of the Black Prince in Gascony from 1355 to 1357. He was present when Edward III's forces approached Paris in the spring of 1360 and fought at the Battle of Nájera under the Black Prince in 1367.

Hales was elected a member of parliament for Norfolk in January 1377, January 1380, 1381, May 1382, October 1382, Feb. 1383, October 1383, November 1384 and 1386. He was a justice of the peace for Norfolk from 1380 to his death and was appointed High Sheriff of Norfolk and Suffolk for 1378–1379.

He married Joan, who was probably the daughter of John Novers of Swanton Novers, Norfolk. They had no children and was thus succeeded by his brother Thomas.
