= Sir Armine Wodehouse, 5th Baronet =

British politician and militia officer

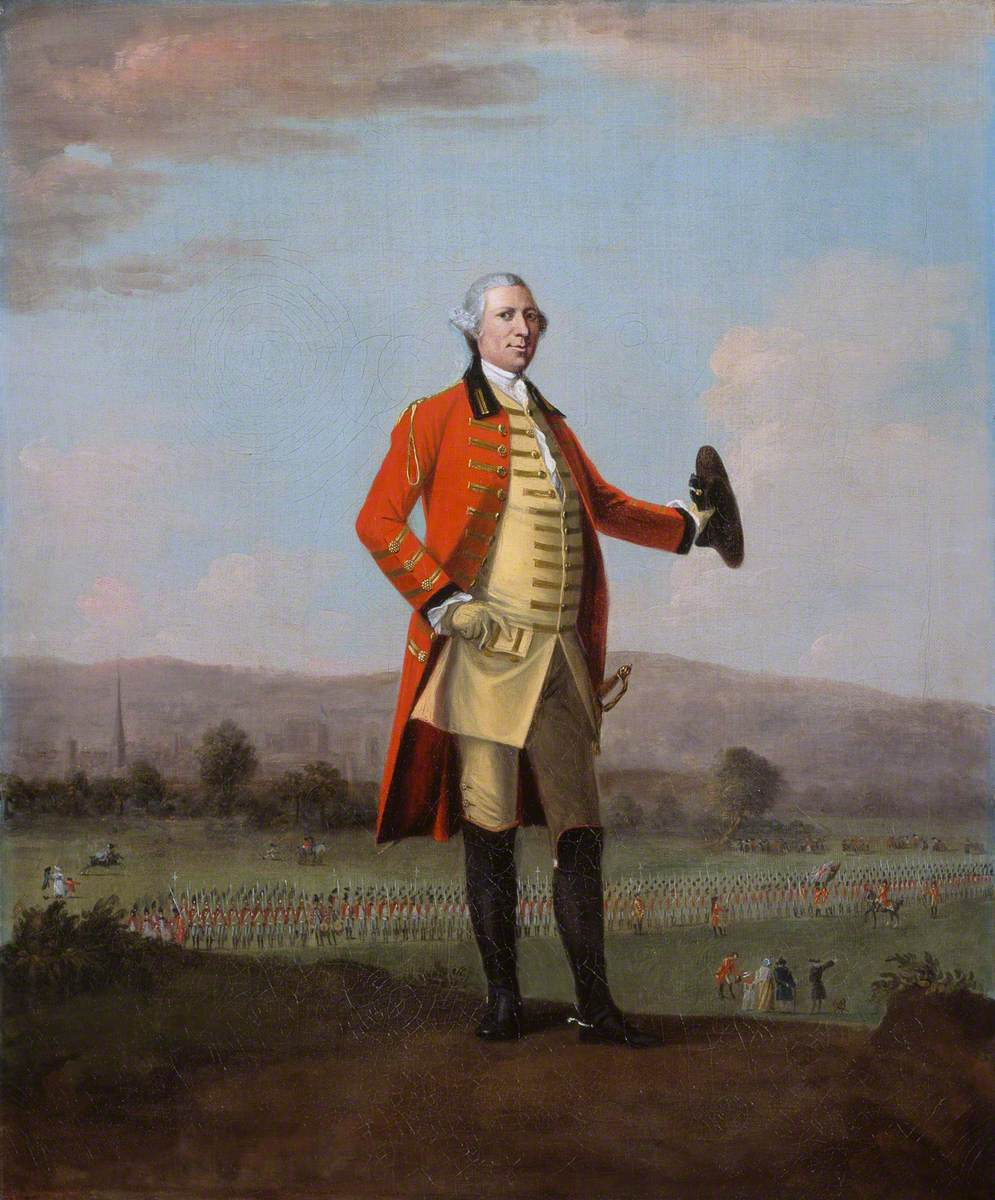
Portrait by David Morier, c. 1759

Colonel Sir Armine Wodehouse, 5th Baronet (c. 1714 – 21 May 1777) was a British Tory politician and militia officer.

Wodehouse was born in 1714, the son of Sir John Wodehouse, 4th Baronet, and Mary Fermor. His unusual first name reflects his connection with the Armine baronets through his grandmother Anne Armine. He was elected to the House of Commons for Norfolk in 1737, a seat he held until 1768. In 1754 he succeeded his father in the baronetcy and to the family seat of Kimberley Hall in Norfolk. He was appointed Colonel of the East Norfolk Militia in 1758 and held the command until succeeded by his eldest son in 1774.

Wodehouse married Letitia Bacon, daughter of Sir Edmund Bacon, 6th Baronet, in 1738. He died in 1777 and was succeeded in the baronetcy by his eldest son John, who was created Baron Wodehouse in 1797 and who was the great-grandfather of statesman John Wodehouse, 1st Earl of Kimberley. Wodehouse's second son, Reverend Philip Wodehouse (1745–1811), was the great-grandfather of the author P. G. Wodehouse, while his third son, Thomas Wodehouse, was the grandfather of the colonial administrator Sir Philip Wodehouse.

== Notes ==
Parliament of Great Britain
Preceded by Sir Edmund Bacon, Bt. William Wodehouse	Member of Parliament for Norfolk; 1737–1768; With: Sir Edmund Bacon, Bt. 1737–1741; Viscount Coke 1741–1747; George Townshend 1747–1764; Thomas de Grey 1764–1768	Succeeded by Thomas de Grey; Sir Edward Astley, Bt.
Baronetage of England
Preceded by John Wodehouse	Baronet of Wilberhall; 1754–1777	Succeeded by John Wodehouse
