= John Payn (MP for Norfolk) =

English politician

John Payn (died 1402), of Wymondham, Norfolk, was an English politician.

He married Sybil Hethersett of Hethersett, Norfolk.

He was a Member (MP) of the Parliament of England for Norfolk in 1401.
