= Cary Coke =

English book collector

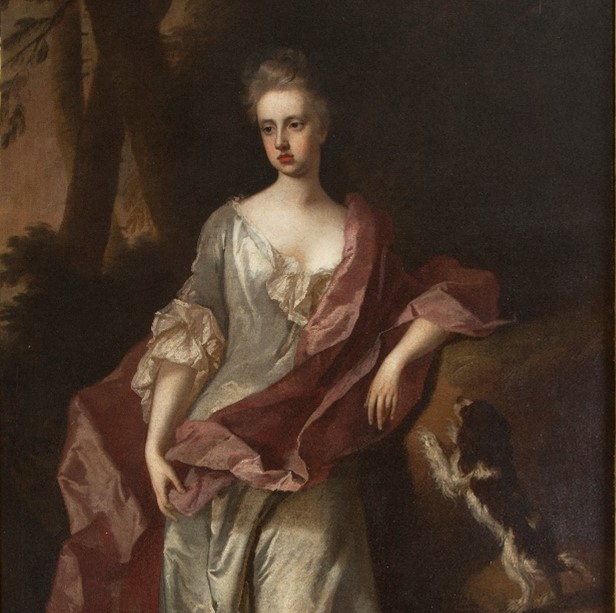
- portrait by Michael Dahl
- Born: 9 June 1680
- Died: 4 August 1707 (aged 27)
- Spouse(s): Edward Coke
- Children: Anne Coke, Edward Coke, Robert Coke, Cary Coke, Thomas Coke
- Parent(s): Sir John Newton, 3rd Bt.; Abigail Heveningham

Cary Coke (née Newton) (9 June 1680 – 4 August 1707) was a book collector and patron of the English theatre. A daughter of Sir John Newton MP, of Barrs Court, she was the mother of Thomas Coke, first Earl of Leicester.

== Life ==
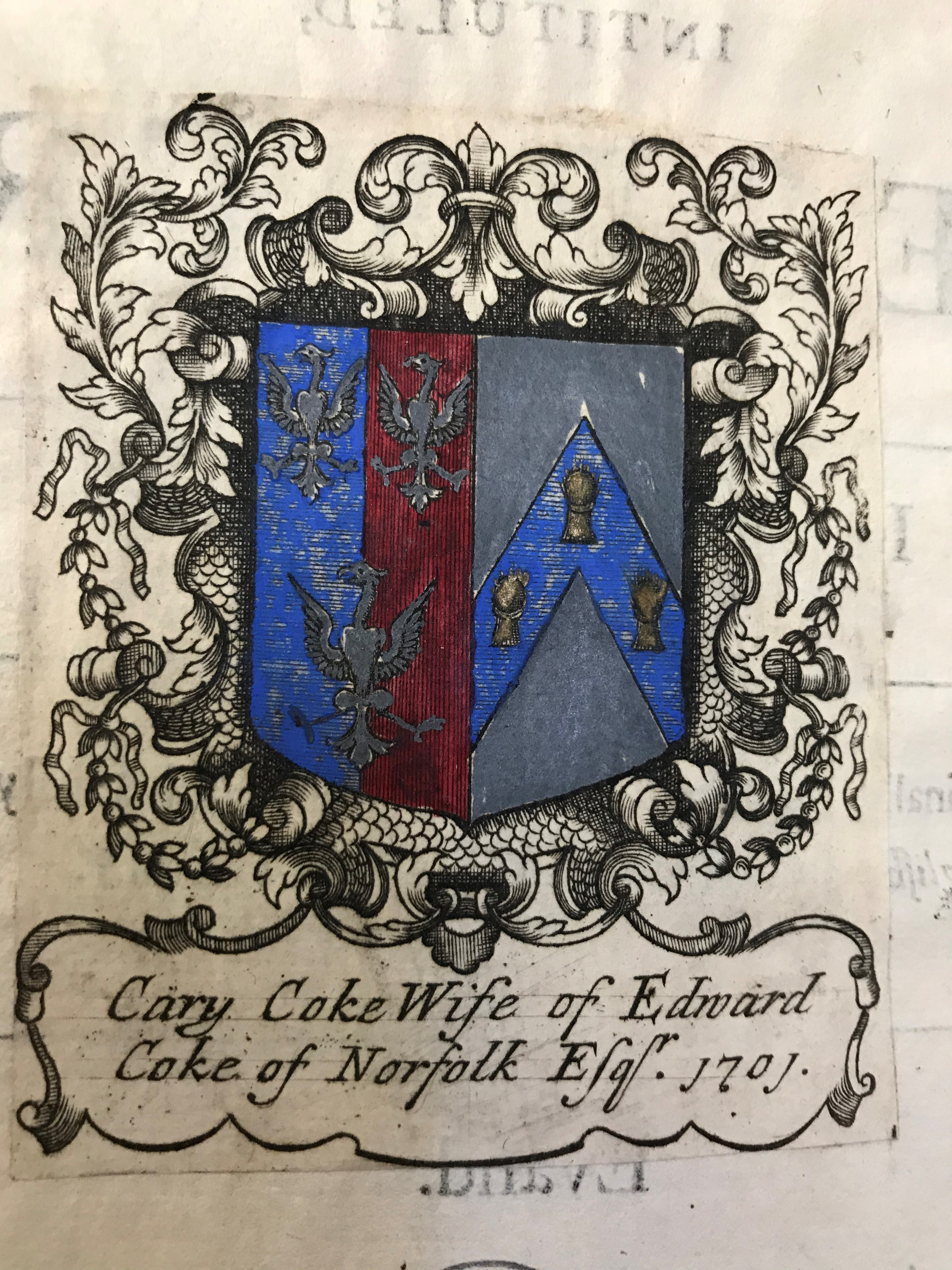
Coke's bookplate from a book in the Bodleian Libraries

Cary Coke was the daughter of Sir John Newton, 3rd baronet, of Barrs Court, Gloucestershire. She was born on 9 June 1680. On 3 June, 1696 she married Edward Coke who had inherited the Holkham Hall estate in north Norfolk. Of their children, three sons and two daughters survived them. Their son Thomas (1697- 1759), became the 1st Earl of Leicester.

Both Coke and her husband were enthusiastic patrons of the theatre. Mary Pix dedicated her play Queen Catherine to Coke in 1698.

In April 1707, her husband Edward died, and she followed a few months later on 4 August. Her will is held in the National Archives of the United Kingdom. They died with debts exceeding £22,000, and whilst most of their possessions were sold, books valued at £193 6s were kept for their eldest son, Thomas.

== Collections ==
Both Coke and her husband were book collectors and in 1701 each had a bookplate made. Some of these books are now located in the Holkham library. Some of the Holkham Collection, including 305 English Restoration plays from the Coke collection, was purchased by the Bodleian Library in 1953. The plays in the Coke collection are valuable due to their apparently unaltered condition, with none of the plays having been perfected and no volumes have been disbound to dispose of duplicates.
