= Margaret Coke, Countess of Leicester =

British Peeress

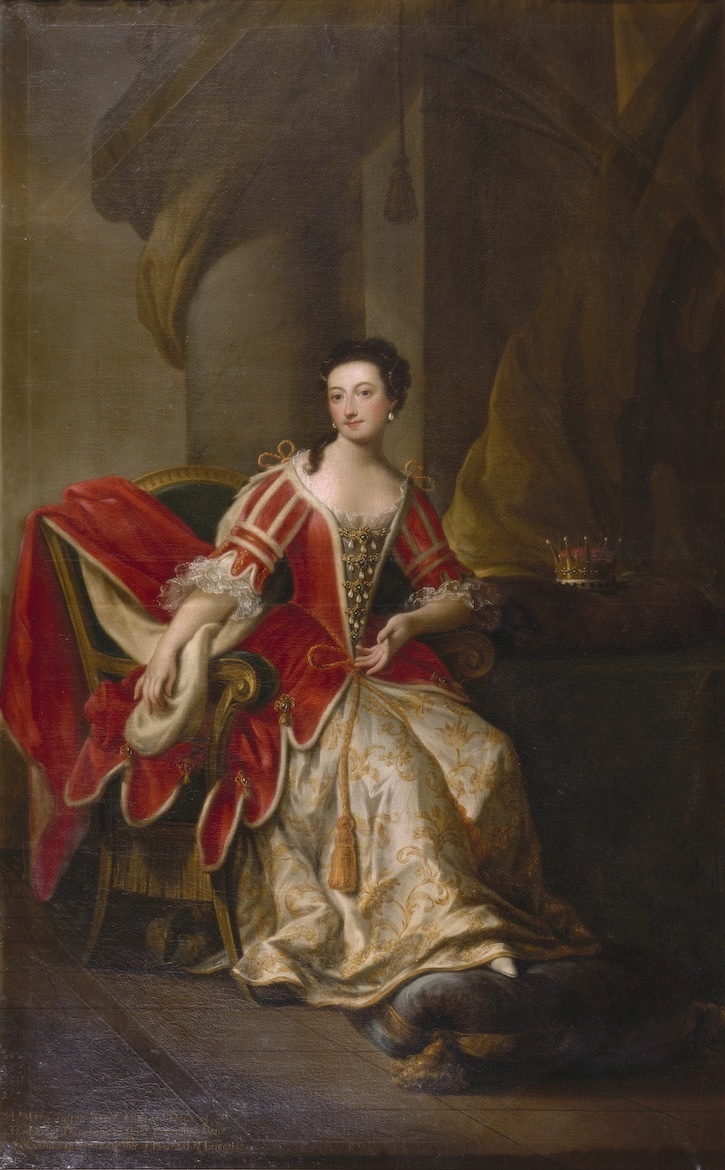
- Lady Margaret Tufton, Countess of Leicester by Andrea Casali (1705–1784). Depicted wearing countess's coronation robe and coronet.

Baroness de Clifford
- Tenure: 1734–1775
- Predecessor: Thomas Tufton, 18th Baron de Clifford
- Successor: Edward Southwell, 20th Baron de Clifford
- Born: Lady Margaret Tufton; 16 June 1700
- Died: 28 February 1775 (aged 74)
- Spouse: Thomas Coke, 1st Earl of Leicester (m. 1718; died 1759)
- Issue: Edward Coke, Viscount Coke

Margaret Coke, Countess of Leicester (née Tufton, 16 June 1700 – 28 February 1775), also suo jure 19th Baroness de Clifford, was a British noblewoman and peeress.

She was born Lady Margaret Tufton, the third daughter of Thomas Tufton, 6th Earl of Thanet by his wife Lady Catherine, daughter of Henry Cavendish, 2nd Duke of Newcastle-upon-Tyne.

On 3 July 1718, she was married to Thomas Coke. Their only child Edward was born on 6 February 1726. Coke was raised to the peerage as Baron Lovel on 28 May 1728 and his wife became known as the Lady Lovel.

On 30 July 1729, her father Lord Thanet died. He was also 18th Baron de Clifford, and as he had no surviving male issue this title fell into abeyance between five co-heirs: Margaret, her two elder sisters Catherine (widow of Edward Watson, Viscount Sondes) and Anne (widow of James Cecil, 5th Earl of Salisbury), and her two younger sisters Mary (widow of Anthony Grey, Earl of Harold) and Isabella (wife of Lord Nassau Powlett). The abeyance was terminated in Margaret's favour on 3 August 1734, and she became 19th Baroness Clifford in her own right.

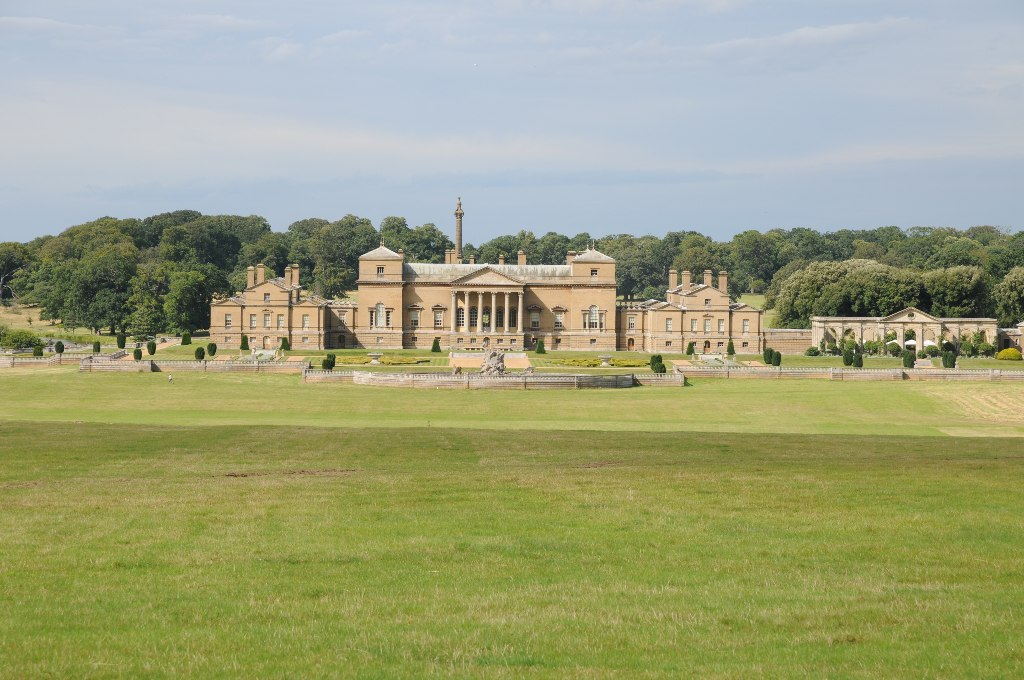
Holkham Hall, Norfolk.

Her husband, who had spent many years of his youth abroad on the Grand Tour, returned to England determined to build an English country house in the Palladian style. This was realised as Holkham Hall, which took decades to build, from the 1730s to the 1760s. Margaret oversaw the finishing and furnishing of the house.

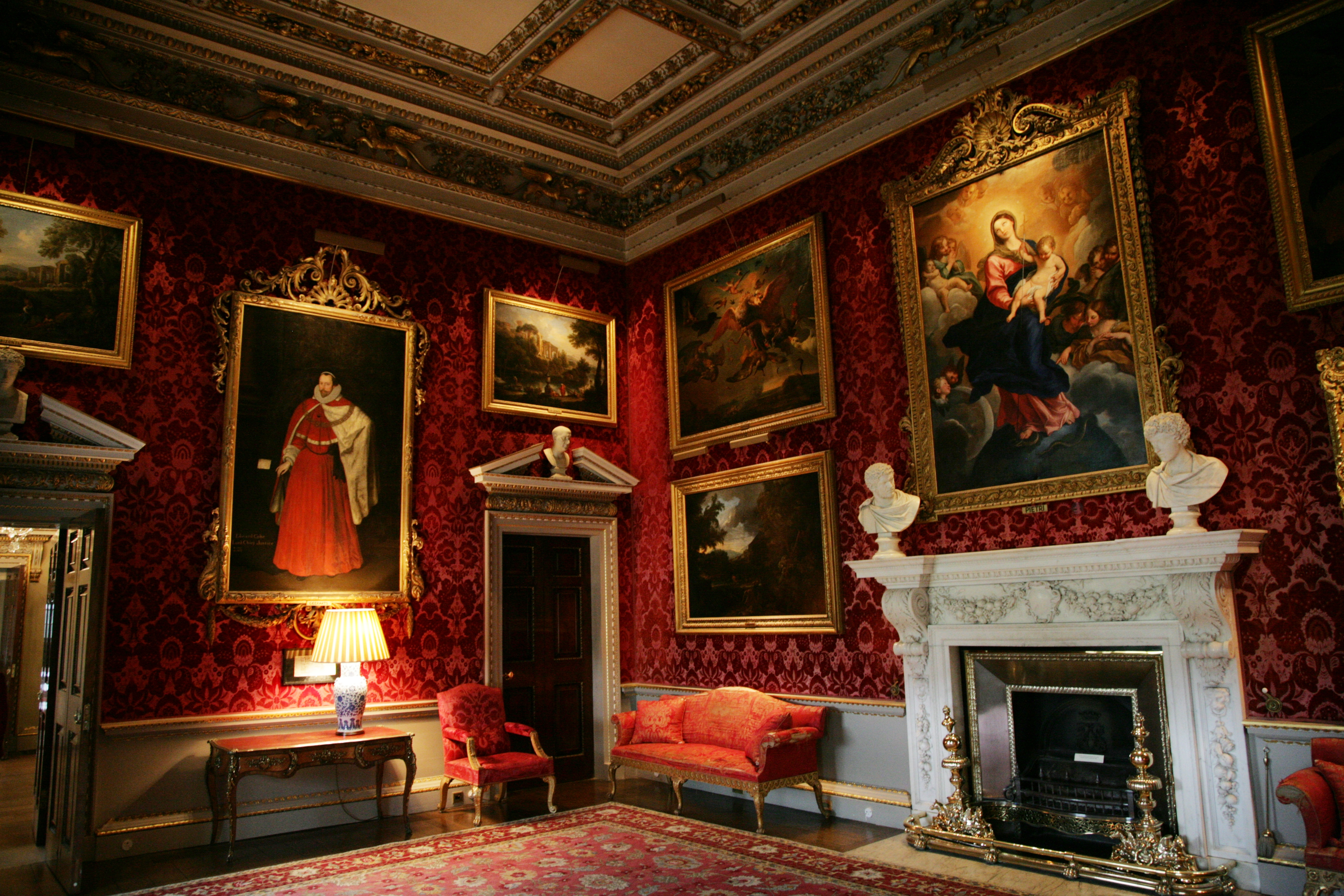
Holkham Hall interior

On 9 May 1744, Lord Lovel was created Earl of Leicester, and his wife became the Countess of Leicester. Their son Edward (now styled Viscount Coke) died without issue on 31 August 1753, and Lord Leicester died on 20 April 1759.

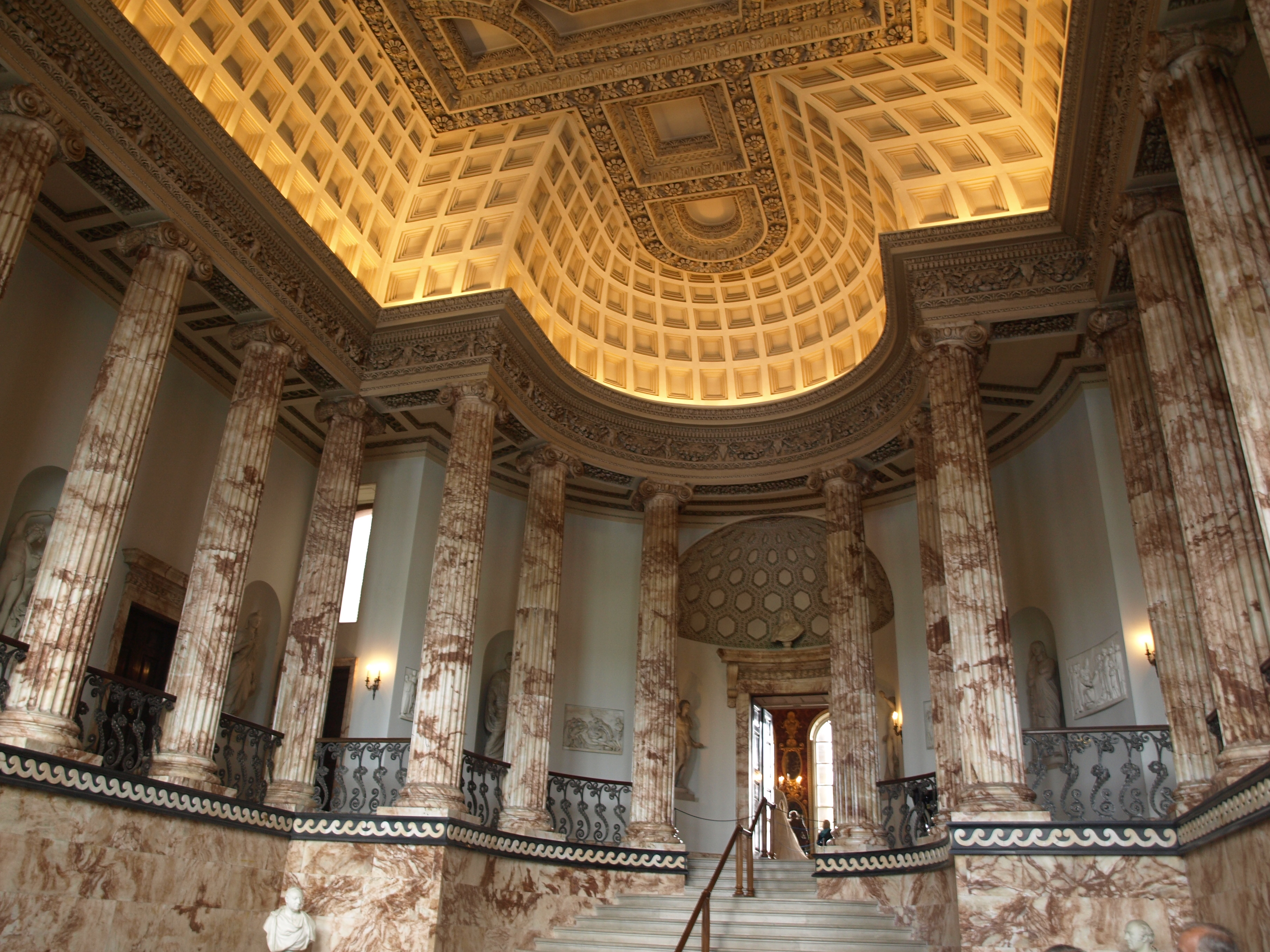
Holkham marble hall, the decorating wasn't finished until 1764.

Lady Leicester died on 28 February 1775, and her barony again fell into abeyance. The co-heirs were now Edward Southwell (grandson of the eldest sister Catherine); James Cecil, 6th Earl of Salisbury (son of the second sister Anne); the fourth sister Mary (now widow of John Leveson-Gower, 1st Earl Gower); and the fifth sister Isabella, (widow of Sir Francis Blake Delaval) or her daughter Isabella (wife of John Perceval, 3rd Earl of Egmont). The abeyance was terminated in favour of Edward Southwell on 17 April 1776.

Peerage of England
In abeyance Title last held by Thomas Tufton	Baroness de Clifford; 1734–1775	In abeyance Title next held by Edward Southwell
