= William Rees (Liberal politician) =

Welsh politician (d. 1874)

William Rees of Scoveston, Haverfordwest, was a solicitor who served as High Sheriff of Pembrokeshire in 1863. In 1857, he sought election as MP for Haverfordwest as a Liberal candidate and was defeated by a narrow majority of to votes.

Rees became a member of Haverfordwest Town Council in the 1830s and served as mayor on three occasions. He retired as alderman a year before his death.

Rees died in 1874.
