= John Verdon =

American novelist

- Born: January 1, 1942 (age 84); United States of America
- Occupation: Novelist
- Spouse: Naomi
- Writing career
- Language: English
- Genres: Thriller, Adventure, Mystery, Detective
- Notable work: Think of a Number
- Website: www.johnverdon.net

John P. Verdon is an American novelist. In 2010, Crown/Random House published his first mystery thriller, Think of a Number, the debut novel in the Dave Gurney detective series.

== Biography ==
Verdon is a graduate of Regis High School in New York City and Fordham University. His initial career was in the advertising industry in New York City, where he worked on the creative sides of several large agencies. After his retirement from advertising, he and his wife decided to leave the city and move to a rural area in the western foothills of the Catskill Mountains.

In his first pursuit after leaving the city he designed and built Shaker-style furniture—a career he pursued for the next ten years. He also became a fan of classic detective stories, in all their varieties from Arthur Conan Doyle to Ross Macdonald to Reginald Hill.

His wife, Naomi, inspired him to write his own mystery novel. Two years later he completed Think of a Number. Its subsequent success in the marketplace, as well as with critics, persuaded him to write a second novel, Shut Your Eyes Tight, featuring the same central characters. That was the beginning of a series of crime thrillers featuring retired NYPD homicide detective, Dave Gurney. The books in the series have been translated into more than two dozen languages.

== Bibliography ==
- Think of a Number (2010)
- Shut Your Eyes Tight (2011)
- Let the Devil Sleep (2012)
- Peter Pan Must Die (2014)
- Wolf Lake (2016)
- White River Burning (2018)
- On Harrow Hill (2021)
- The Viper (2023)
- Ghost Barn (2026)
