= Norfolk Militia =

British militia unit

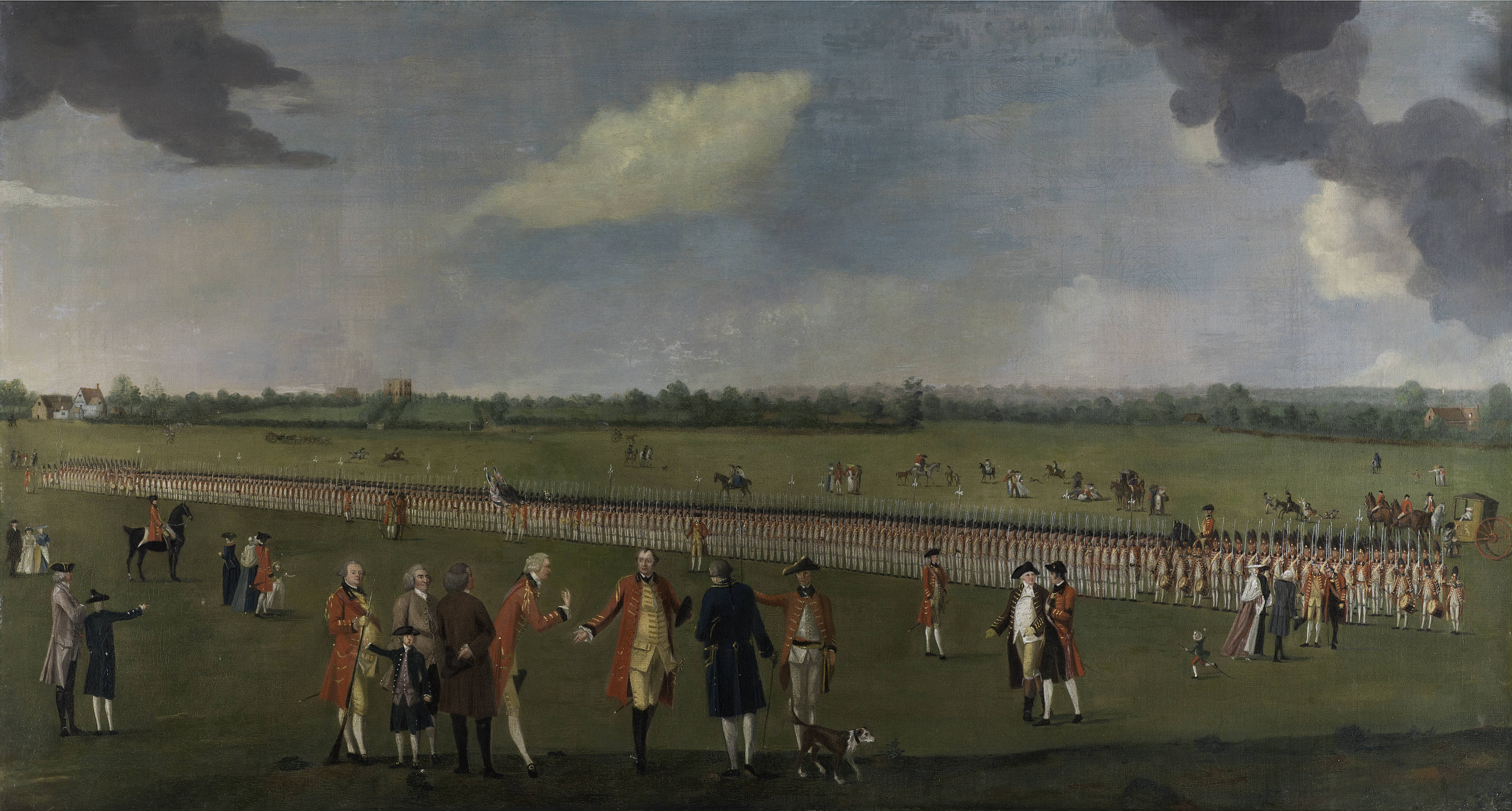
- c. 1759–1763 painting of the Norfolk Militia being reviewed
- Active: 1558–1953
- Country: England (1558–1707); Kingdom of Great Britain (1707–1800); United Kingdom (1801–1953)
- Branch: Militia
- Type: Infantry
- Facings: Black

Commanders
- Notable commanders: George Walpole, 3rd Earl of Orford; George Townshend, 1st Marquess Townshend

The Norfolk Militia was an auxiliary military force in the English county of Norfolk in East Anglia. From their formal organisation as Trained Bands in 1558 until their final service as the Special Reserve, the Militia regiments of the county carried out internal security and home defence duties in all of Britain's major wars. They saw active service during the Bishops' Wars, the English Civil Wars and the Second Boer War, and finally trained thousands of reinforcements during World War I. After a shadowy postwar existence they were formally disbanded in 1953.

== Early history ==
The English militia was descended from the Anglo-Saxon Fyrd, the military force raised from the freemen of the shires under command of their Sheriff. It continued under the Norman kings, and was reorganised under the Assizes of Arms of 1181 and 1252, and again by King Edward I's Statute of Winchester of 1285.

Norfolk was too far distant for its levies to play a role in the Plantagenet kings' Welsh and Scottish campaigns, but they were at times called upon to defend their coastline (for example during Edward III's 1335 offensive in Scotland when the coast was threatened by the French). In 1539 King Henry VIII held a Great Muster of all the counties, recording the number of armed men available in each Hundred, but the lists are incomplete for Norfolk, the totals for the county being 202 archers (foot and mounted) and 519 billmen (foot and mounted), of whom 163 archers and 246 billmen were 'sufficiently harnessed' (ie armoured).

== Norfolk Trained Bands ==
The legal basis of the militia was updated by two acts of 1557, covering musters, Military Service (No. 2) Act 1557 (4 & 5 Ph. & M. c. 3); and the maintenance of horses and armour (4 & 5 Ph. & M. c. 2). The county militia was now under the Lord Lieutenant, assisted by the Deputy Lieutenants and Justices of the Peace (JPs). The entry into force of these Acts in 1558 is seen as the starting date for the organised county militia in England. Although the militia obligation was universal, it was impractical to train and equip every able-bodied man, so after 1572 the practice was to select a proportion of men for the Trained Bands, who were mustered for regular training. During the Armada Crisis of 1588 Norfolk furnished 2200 trained and 2100 untrained armed foot (out of 6340 able-bodied men), together with 80 lancers, 321 light horse and 377 'petronels' (the petronel was an early cavalry firearm).

With the passing of the threat of invasion, the trained bands declined in the early 17th Century. Later, King Charles I attempted to reform them into a national force or 'Perfect Militia' answering to the king rather than local control. The Norfolk Trained Bands of 1638 consisted of over 5100 footmen in four regiments and a 400-strong regiment of horse, while the City of Norwich had it own regiment. The Norfolk TBs were ordered to send contingents for the First and Second Bishops' Wars of 1639–40. However, many of those sent on this unpopular service would have been untrained replacements and conscripts: like many other contingents, the Norfolk men were disorderly, and many officers were corrupt or inefficient.

Control of the militia was one of the areas of dispute between Charles I and Parliament that led to the English Civil War. When open war broke out between the King and Parliament, Norfolk was part of the Eastern Association and firmly under Parliamentarian control, so the TBs were hardly used. As Parliament tightened its grip on the country after winning the First Civil War it passed new Militia Acts in 1648 and 1650 that replaced lords lieutenant with county commissioners appointed by Parliament or the Council of State. The establishment of The Protectorate saw Oliver Cromwell take control of the militia as a paid force under politically selected officers to support his Rule by Major-Generals. From now on the term 'Trained Band' began to be replaced by 'Militia'. The resignation of Richard Cromwell from the Protectorate in 1659 plunged the regime into crisis, and the militia was reorganised under officers deemed politically reliable.

== Restoration Militia ==
Following the Stuart Restoration, the English Militia was re-established by The King's Sole Right over the Militia Act 1661 under the control of the king's lords-lieutenant, the men to be selected by ballot. This was popularly seen as the 'Constitutional Force' to counterbalance a 'Standing Army' tainted by association with the New Model Army that had supported Cromwell's military dictatorship, and almost the whole burden of home defence and internal security was entrusted to the militia under politically reliable local landowners.

The 4th Earl of Southampton was appointed Lord Lieutenant of Norfolk in September 1660 and he began appointing his deputies and militia officers. None of the officers of the Norfolk Militia in 1659 was reappointed in 1660. Sir Horatio Townshend, 3rd Baronet, who took command of the regiment of horse, had been a Militia Commissioner under the previous regime, but had secretly been one of the county's leading pro-Restoration conspirators. Many of the other officers now appointed had held commissions at the end of the First Civil War in 1646 but had afterwards been purged as politically unreliable, such as Sir William D'Oyly, 1st Baronet, who was once again a colonel of foot, or Sir John Holland, 1st Baronet, who had commanded a county foot regiment before the civil war. Others came from families who traditionally provided the company officers in their hundreds:

- Sir Horatio Townshend – regiment of horse (8 troops)
- Sir John Holland - regiment of foot
- Sir Ralph Hare - regiment of foot
- Sir William D'Oyly - regiment of foot
- Thomas Richardson, 2nd Lord Cramond - regiment of foot

The militia were frequently called out during the reign of King Charles II; for example, the Norfolks were alerted in 1666 because of a French and Dutch invasion threat, and in 1673 were sent to guard Yarmouth against a possible Dutch attack. However, the deputy lieutenants and justices were reported to have used the militia to intimidate Norfolk voters during elections in the 1670s.

In 1690 the 7th Duke of Norfolk, as Lord Lieutenant, reported the organisation of the county militia, and a national muster was also held in 1697, listing the Hundreds from which the companies were recruited:

- Regiment of Horse, Col the Duke of Norfolk – six troops)
- Blew (Blue) Regiment, Col Sir Jacob Astley, 1st Baronet – seven companies from Holt, North and South Erpingham, Tunstead, Mitford, Happing and Eynsford
- Yellow Regiment, Col Robert Walpole – seven companies from Smithdon, Launditch, Freebridge Marshland, Clackclose, North Greenhoe, Freebridge Lynn, and Gallow & Brotherclose
- Purple Regiment, Col Sir Thomas Knyvett (1690), Col Edmund Woodhouse (1697) – seven companies from Forehoe, Depwade, Humbleyard, Shropham & Guiltcross, Diss, Wayland & Grimshoe, and South Greenhoe
- White Regiment, Col Sir William Cooke (1690), Sir Richard Berney (1697) – seven companies from Blofield & Walsham, Taverham, Clavering, Henstead, Earsham, East & West Flegg, and Loddon
- Yarmouth Regiment – four companies clothed in red
- King's Lynn – two companies clothed in red
- City of Norwich Regiment, Col the Duke of Norfolk – six companies clothed in red

Total 4532 foot in 40 companies, 335 horse in six troops

However, the Militia passed into virtual abeyance during the long peace after the Treaty of Utrecht in 1713, and few units were called out during the Jacobite Risings of 1715 and 1745.

== 1757 reforms ==
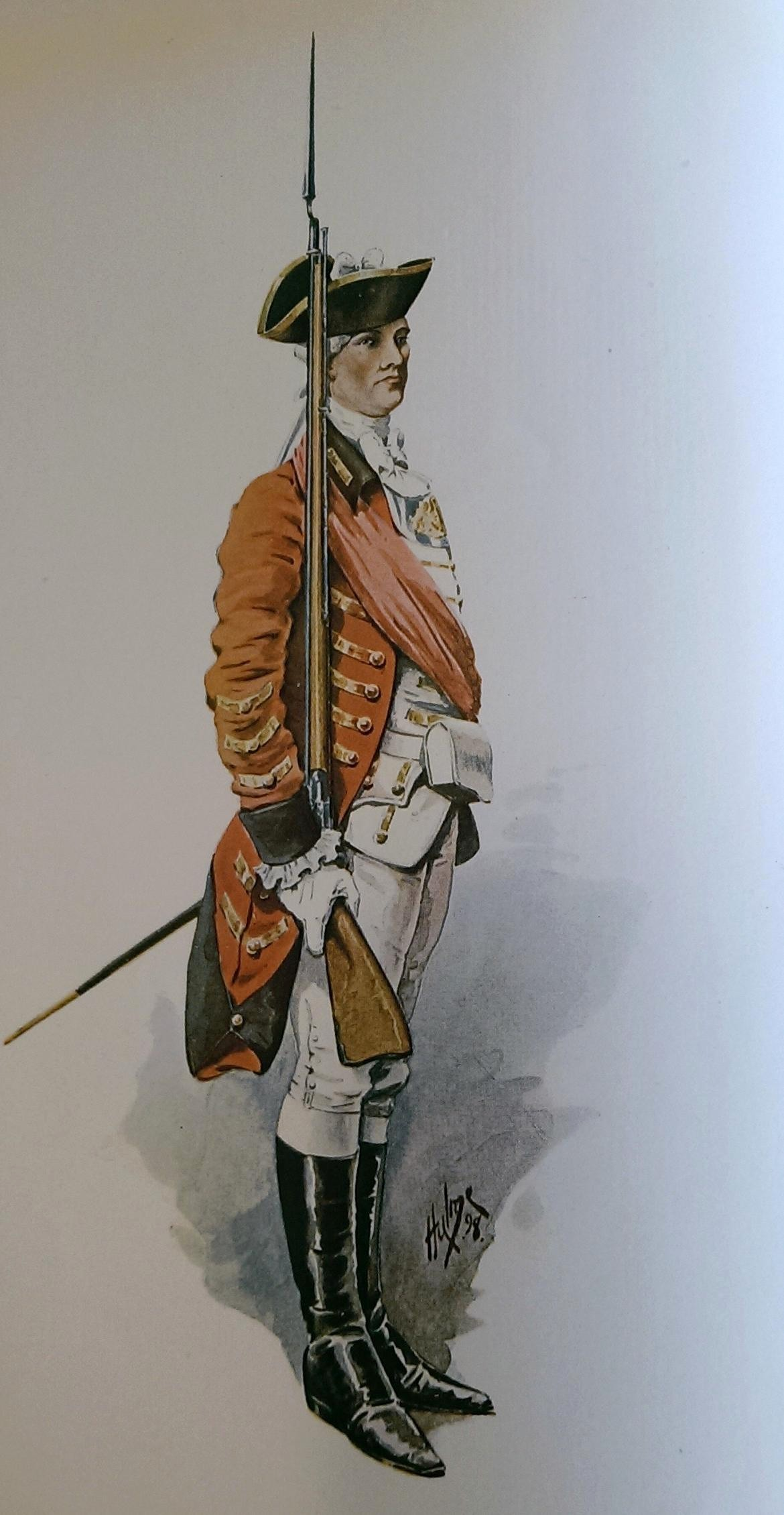
Illustration of a Norfolk Militia officer in 1759

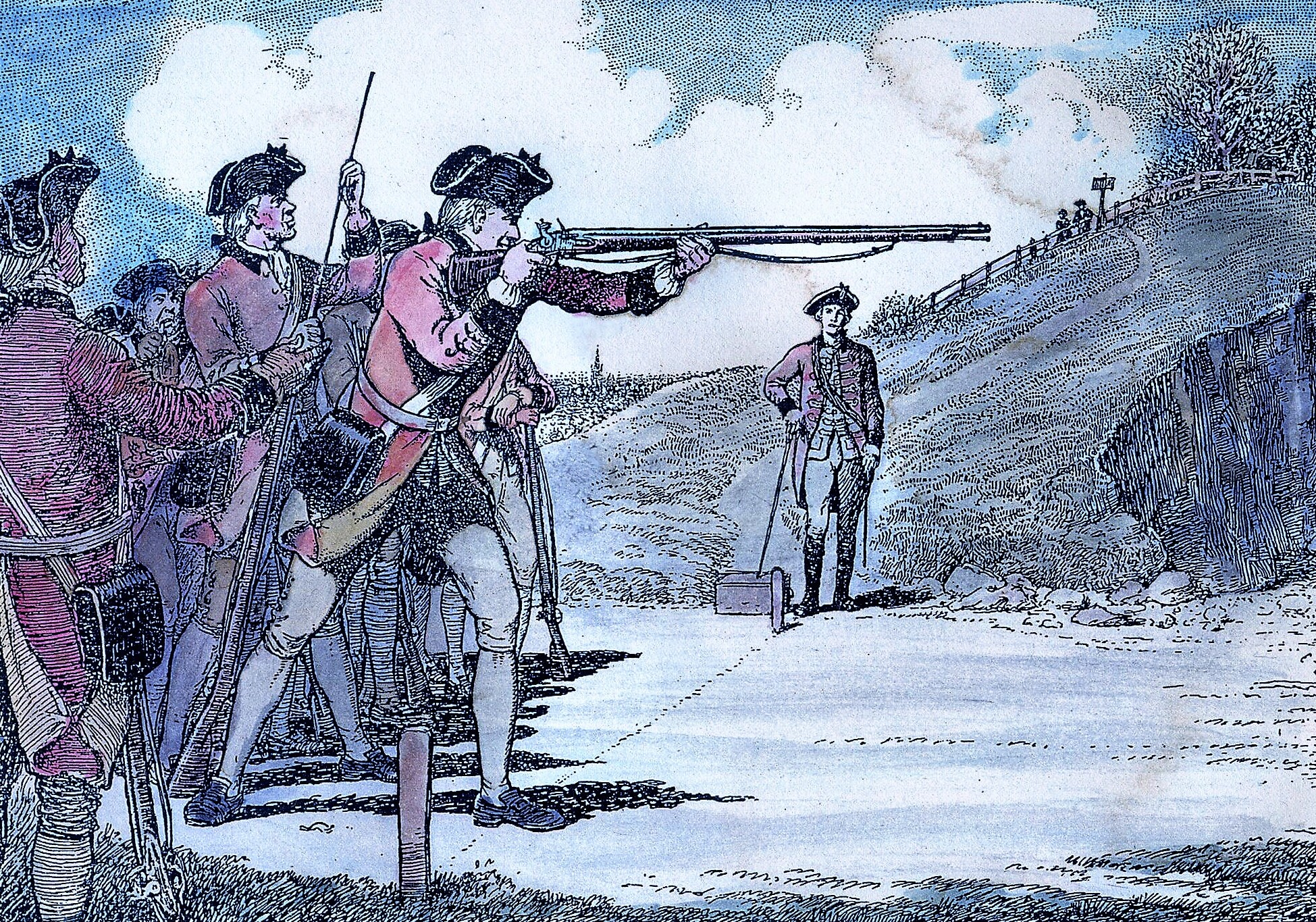
The Norfolk Militia undergoing musketry training in 1759

Under threat of French invasion during the Seven Years' War a series of Militia Acts from 1757 reorganised the county militia regiments, the men being conscripted by means of parish ballots (paid substitutes were permitted) to serve for three years. In peacetime they assembled for 28 days' annual training. There was a property qualification for officers, who were commissioned by the lord lieutenant. An adjutant and drill sergeants were to be provided to each regiment from the Regular Army, and arms and accoutrements would be supplied when the county had secured 60 per cent of its quota of recruits.

Norfolk's quota was set at 960 men in two battalions, Norwich contributing 151 of the men. The Lord Lieutenant of Norfolk, the 3rd Earl of Orford, was an enthusiast for the militia, and made rapid progress with the assistance of the Townshend family, particularly Col George Townshend, MP for Norfolk, who promoted the militia legislation in parliament. A number of old soldiers were recruited as sergeants to train the balloted men, and a number of volunteers to the ranks were appointed as corporals. Both battalions received their arms on 7 October 1758 and paraded at Fakenham in November. Orford appointed George Townshend as colonel of the 1st or Western Battalion and Sir Armine Wodehouse, 5th Baronet, of the 2nd or Eastern Battalion. The two battalions were embodied for fulltime service on 24 June 1759 and on 4 July marched by four 'divisions' (half battalions) to Portsmouth to do duty under Major-General Holmes. Due to the heat, they set off soon after midnight, but were described as being in good spirits. The Western Battalion would have been under the command of Lt-Col William Windham, because Townshend was serving as a brigadier in Wolfe's expedition to Quebec. En route the two battalions passed through London and under Orford's command were reviewed by King George II in front of Kensington Palace. They were the first of the reformed militia regiments 'which offered to march wherever they might be most serviceable to the public defence', and the King ordered that they 'should be distinguished by the title of Militia Royal', but this was never done. The Prince of Wales (soon to be King George III) also showed the Norfolk Militia favour. (Note: Norfolk claimed to have raised the first regiment under the new Acts, but it was actually the second county regiment (after Dorset) to be issued with arms.)

By August the divisions of the two battalions were alternately guarding prisoners of war and undergoing training. While at Hilsea Barracks, Portsmouth, Windham published a drill manual, A Plan of Discipline, Composed for the Use of the Militia of the County of Norfolk, probably drawing on Townshend's knowledge, and which Townshend revised in 1768 after Windham's death. This is said to have become one of the most important drill manuals employed during the American Revolution.

Hilsea Barracks proved to be infected with Smallpox, Dysentery and Typhus, and the men from isolated Norfolk villages with little immunity succumbed in large numbers. Casualties were severe, and those who did not die suffered long convalescences. In October the Norfolks were relieved by the Warwickshire Militia, but only after the barracks had been thoroughly cleaned.

During the autumn of 1759–60 the Norfolk companies were first dispersed in billets across Hampshire and Surrey, and then in November they were marched to Cirencester in Gloucestershire, where they were joined by a recruiting party and recruits from Norwich. In June 1760 the East battalion marched back to Norwich and Yarmouth, where they took over guarding French prisoners. On 28 May 1761 King George granted the two battalions of the Norfolk Militia a 'Warrant for Colours'. That summer the East Battalion took over duties at Ipswich and Landguard Fort, then in October moved to winter quarters in King's Lynn and Fakenham.

With the Seven Years' War drawing to an end orders to disembody the two Norfolk battalions were issued on 15 December 1762. Annual training continued thereafter– the West Norfolks usually at East Dereham and the East Norfolks at Norwich or Yarmouth – ballots were held regularly, and officers were commissioned to fill vacancies. Sir Armine Wodehouse gave up the command of the East Battalion and his eldest son John Wodehouse was promoted to Lt-Col on 19 May 1774 and then to Colonel on 6 June the same year: he had marched as a private militiaman in the regiment under his father's command when it was first raised.

=== American War of Independence ===
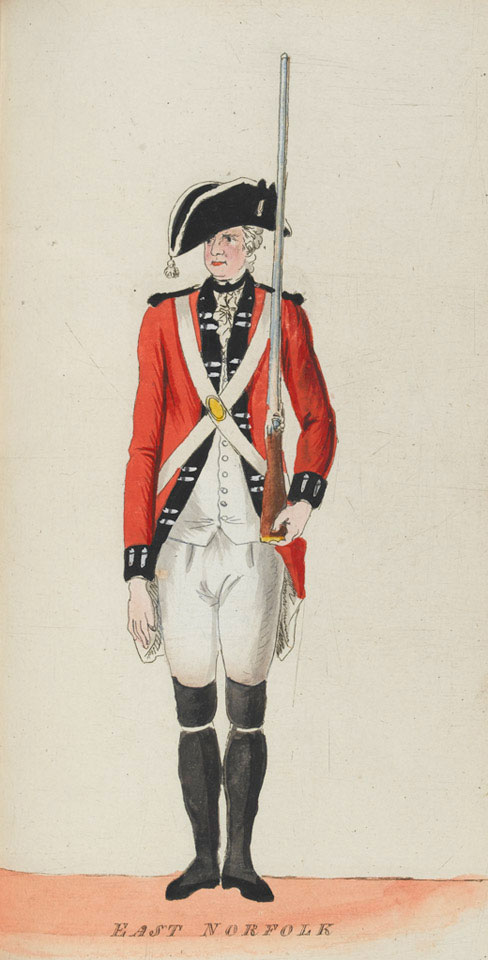
c. 1780 engraving of an East Norfolk Militia private

The militia was called out after the outbreak of the War of American Independence when the country was threatened with invasion by the Americans' allies, France and Spain. Orford ordered the Norfolk Militia to assemble on 13 April 1778 and he took personal command of the West Norfolks. From June 1778 the East and West Norfolks are officially referred to as 'regiments' rather than 'battalions'. General officers were sent to inspect the regiments and report on their fitness for service: the East Norfolks was one of the regiments found to be lacking in training, largely because it was composed almost entirely of new recruits.

It became normal policy to gather the militia regiments into encampments during the summer months where they could be exercised in larger formations. During the summer of 1779 the East Norfolks were at Coxheath Camp near Maidstone in Kent, which was the army's largest training camp, where the Militia were exercised as part of a division alongside Regular troops while providing a reserve in case of French invasion of South East England. However, the West Norfolks under the Earl of Orford encamped by themselves at Aldeburgh in Suffolk during the summers of 1778–80. Nevertheless, the regiment made good progress in its field training, including the use of boats to seize ships offshore, even if they were less impressive on parade. A frequent task for the militia was chasing smugglers. At Aldeburgh in 1779 the West Norfolks tried to intercept boats landing contraband – on one occasion the men riding baggage horses in pursuit of the smugglers. The government always took the precaution of stationing the militia outside their own counties, so that they would not be called upon to fight their friends and relations.

The Treaty of Paris to end the war was now being negotiated, and the militia could be stood down. The West Norfolks were disembodied at King's Lynn and the East Norfolks at Wymondham in March 1783. From 1784 to 1792 the militia were supposed to assemble for 28 days' annual training, even though to save money only two-thirds of the men were actually called out each year. In 1786 the number of permanent non-commissioned officers (NCOs) was reduced.

=== French Revolutionary War ===
The militia had already been called out in December 1792 before Revolutionary France declared war on Britain on 1 February 1793. The French Revolutionary Wars saw a new phase for the English militia: they were embodied for a whole generation, and became regiments of full-time professional soldiers (though restricted to service in the British Isles), which the regular army increasingly saw as a prime source of recruits. They served in coast defences, manning garrisons, guarding prisoners of war, and for internal security, while their traditional local defence duties were taken over by the Volunteers and mounted Yeomanry.

The two Norfolk regiments began the usual round of summer camps, usually in the invasion-threatened counties of Essex, Kent or Sussex, with winter quarters in the towns: in 1795 the East Norfolks were quartered in the Medway Towns to prevent rioting. Other duties included guarding the Royal Gun Powder Magazine at Purfleet, and the huge purpose-built Prisoner-of-war camp at Norman Cross Barracks. The regiments were frequently drawn upon for volunteers to transfer to the Regular Army

In 1798 the militia regiments were augmented with men from the Supplementary Militia (see below). Part of the reason for the augmentation was the outbreak of the Irish Rebellion of 1798, which drew away many of the regulars from mainland Britain. The Militia (No. 4) Act 1798 also allowed the English militia to volunteer for service in Ireland. In September 1798 the officers and most of the men of the East and West Norfolk Militia volunteered for service there but their offer was not accepted.

In June 1800 the East Norfolks marched to the north of England, where it was stationed in Yorkshire, Staffordshire, Derbyshire and Lancashire. In September 1801 a preliminary peace treaty was agreed, and with the prospect of the militia being stood down the East Norfolks returned to East Anglia. Hostilities ended with the Treaty of Amiens on 27 March 1802, and the militia were disembodied, the East Norfolks on 24 April.

=== Supplementary Militia ===
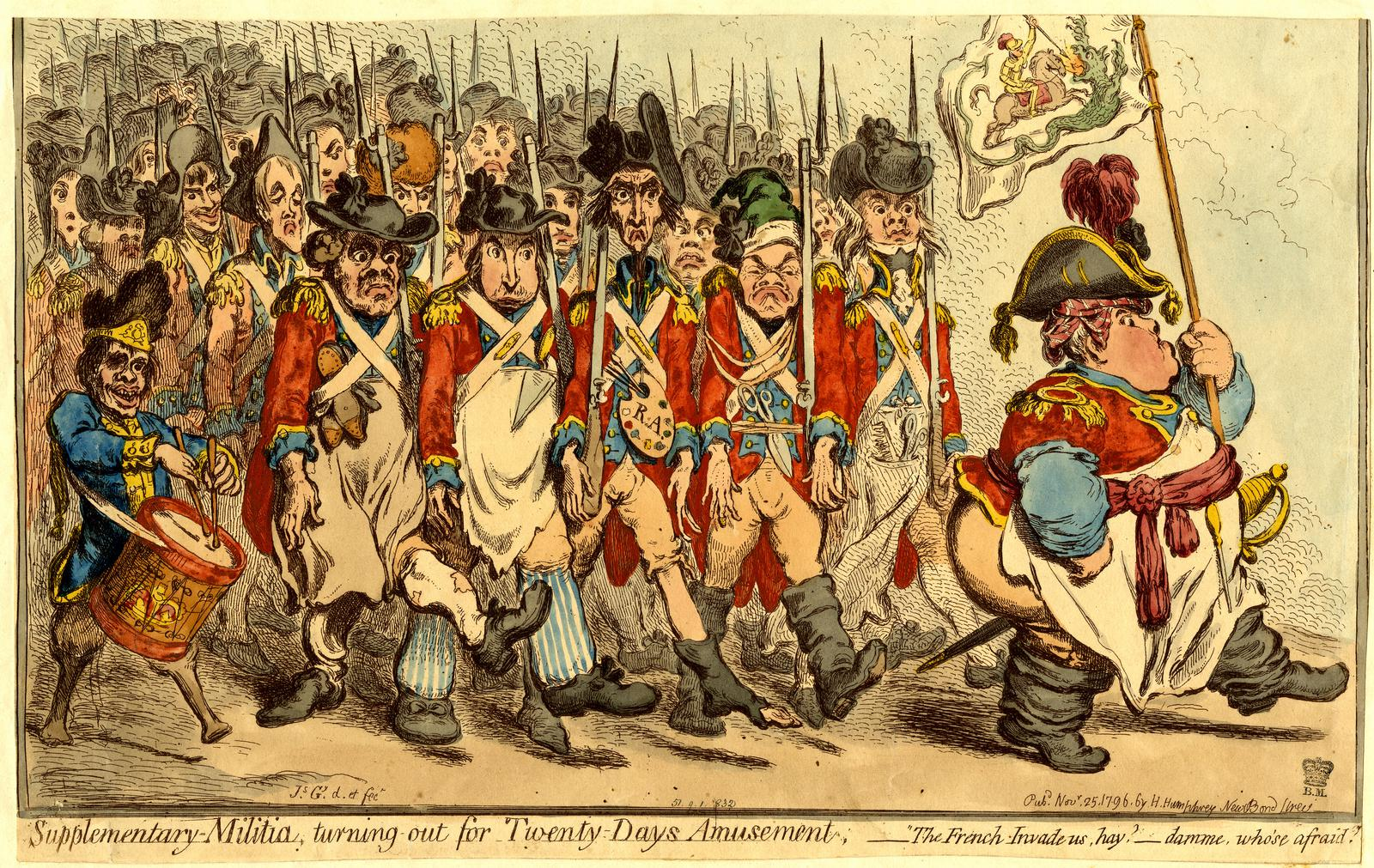
1796 caricature of the Supplementary Militia by James Gillray

In a fresh attempt to have as many men as possible under arms for home defence in order to release regular troops for overseas service, the government created the Supplementary Militia in 1796, a compulsory levy of men to be trained in their spare time, and to be incorporated into the permanent militia in emergency. Norfolk's additional quota was fixed at 1992 men (of which Norwich was to find 211). The lieutenancies were required to carry out 20 days' initial training for the supplementaries as soon as possible.

Opposition to conscription led to rioting against the Supplementary Militia ballot, and Norfolk was one of the counties affected. At the general meeting at Norwich on 15 November 1796 a mob clustered round the carriages of Lord Townshend and his deputies, and would not let them enter the courthouse until a public session was promised. Once inside the act was explained to them, but the leaders of the mob kept the meeting in an uproar until the lieutenancy retired to conduct their business in a nearby inn. At Lalingford in the most disturbed part of the county, a meeting to receive the balloting lists was stopped by the mob. A second general meeting was held at Norwich without incident after the magistrates pledged their assistance, special constables were sworn in to keep the peace, and a body of troops was drawn up in front of the castle. The mob contented themselves with burning Prime Minister William Pitt and Secretary at War William Windham (son of Col William Windham) in effigy. Eventually Norwich supplied 211 of the 1992 supplementary militiamen required of the county. The Norfolk Supplementaries were organised in six 'divisions', the first being called out for training on 11 February 1797.

There was a call-out of the supplementary militia in 1798 to replace militiamen who had volunteered to transfer to the Regular Army, and to augment the embodied militia. Half of the Norfolk Supplementaries were embodied at Castle Hill in Norwich on 14 March. They formed an additional regiment, designated the 3rd Norfolk Militia (1st Supplementary), under the command of Col the Hon Henry Hobart, MP for Norwich, with Thomas Preston (later Sir Thomas Hulton Preston, 1st Baronet) as his Lt-Col. The rest of the East Division of the Norfolk Supplementary Militia were sent to Cambridge to join the 'Old' East Norfolk Militia

A new act of Parliament of 1799 permitted the Regulars to recruit from both the permanent and supplementary militia, the supplementaries who did not volunteer being stood down. The East Norfolks complained that an army recruiting party had come to 'ingratiate itself and corrupt the men' even before the act had passed. Most recruits came from the longer-serving militiamen, and few of the Norfolk Supplementaries enlisted because many of them were married. The Norfolk Supplementaries were re-embodied (probably for annual training) on 24 August 1801

=== Napoleonic Wars ===
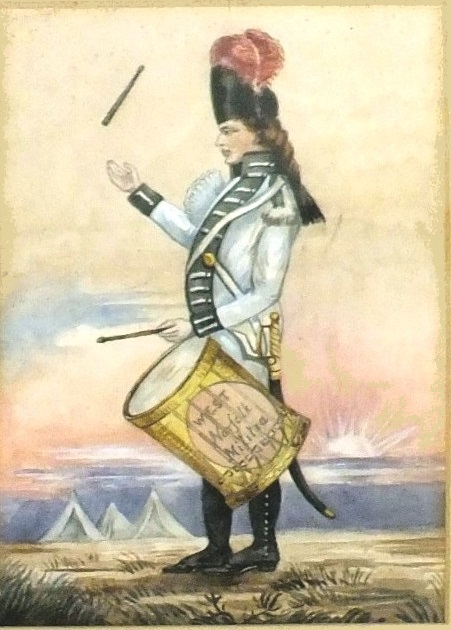
Illustration of a West Norfolk Militia drummer

However, the Peace of Amiens was short-lived and Britain declared war on France once more on 18 May 1803, the West and East Norfolk regiments having already been re-embodied at Yarmouth, East Dereham and Swaffham on 21 March. In June 1804 the West and East Norfolks, with other militia regiments, were stationed at Colchester, using Lexden Heath for parades. On 25 July 1804 the two regiments marched from Colchester barracks and arrived at Coxheath Camp in Kent on 27 July after a rapid and fatiguing march. The East and West Norfolks with the Royal Buckinghamshire Militia formed Maj-Gen Baird's Brigade.

Militia duties during the Napoleonic War were much as before: home defence and garrisons, prisoners of war, and increasingly internal security in the industrial areas where there was unrest. The regular army regarded the militia as a source of trained men and many militiamen took the proffered bounty and transferred, leaving the militia regiments to replace them through the ballot or 'by beat of drum'.

In 1805 Napoleon turned his attention to invading England, and started to assemble an expeditionary force at Boulogne. With the British Isles threatened with invasion, the Norfolk Militia were ordered to join the Southern District (Sussex), which covered Kent east of the River Cray and Holwood Hill; Sussex; and Tilbury Fort in Essex. The district was commanded by Gen Sir David Dundas and Lt-Gen the Earl of Chatham with Headquarters in Canterbury. Together with the Nottinghamshire Militia the East and West Norfolks formed the infantry brigade of Maj-Gen Alexander Mackenzie Fraser, headquartered in Winchelsea and defending Dungeness. On 1 September the West Norfolks had 712 men under Lt-Col George Nelthorpe, the East Norfolks 698 men under Lt-Col Sir George Berney Brograve, 2nd Baronet. All 10 West Norfolk companies and 5 of the East Norfolks were at Clifford Camp, the other 5 of the East Norfolks at Rye & Pleydon Barracks with the Nottinghamshires.

Large numbers of militia were recruited into the Regulars during 1805, and recourse had to be made to the ballot to make up the numbers, and large amounts were paid for substitutes, though the establishments of the Norfolk regiments were reduced to the numbers before the Supplementaries were added (98 NCOs and drummers, 786 privates). In October 1805 Norfolk had to raise an additional 248 militiamen to replace those who had enlisted in the army.

Over the next few years the two regiments moved around South-East England. On 16 August 1809 the West Norfolk Militia, under the command of the Earl of Orford, marched into Norwich from Colchester, the first time the regiment had been stationed in the city for nearly 30 years. Later the Norfolk Militia became heavily involved in operating the Norman Cross prison camp and in escorting prisoners there from Yarmouth. Lieutenant Thomas Borrow of the West Norfolk Militia, father of the author George Borrow, was quartered at Norman Cross from July 1811 to April 1813 and George spent his ninth and tenth years in the barracks there. He later dramatised the prison in his book Lavengro. By April 1813 the West Norfolks were stationed at Berwick-upon-Tweed, and from there they went to Edinburgh Castle in Scotland.

=== Local Militia ===
While the Militia were the mainstay of national defence during the Revolutionary and Napoleonic Wars, they were supplemented from 1808 by the Local Militia, which were part-time and only to be used within their own districts. These were raised to counter the declining numbers of Volunteers, and if their ranks could not be filled voluntarily the Militia Ballot was employed. They would be trained once a year. Norfolk initially had over 7300 volunteers, enrolled in a large number of separate units, both infantry and cavalry in 1803–04, and many of the Norfolk Volunteers transferred to the Local Militia In August 1808. However, Col Robert Harvey, who had commanded the Norwich Volunteer Regiment, failed to induce enough of his men to transfer as a Local Militia battalion, and resigned his command to Lt-Col Elisha De Hague, who formed a small battalion of five 60-strong companies in January 1809. Eventually Norfolk formed six regiments of local militia, three Western and three Eastern. Artefacts are known from the 3rd Western regiment, and there are reports of the 3rd Eastern Norfolk Local Regiment at Yarmouth, commanded by Lt-Col Commandant William Gould, who had held the same position in the Yarmouth Volunteers. The officers were appointed on 18 February 1809 and the six regiments assembled on 9 May at Yarmouth, King's Lynn, Swaffham and Norwich to perform 28 days' training. They did 20 days' training in 1810, but the likelihood of invasion was lessening. On 22 January 1814 the officers and staff of the 1st and 2nd Eastern and 1st Western regiments made offers of extended service, which were acknowledged but not accepted All the Local Militia were disbanded in 1816.

=== Ireland ===
The Interchange Act 1811 permitted English militia regiments to serve in Ireland once again, for a period of up to two years. The East Norfolks was one of the regiments that volunteered for this service, and in September the main body, 700 strong, marched to Bristol from where it sailed to Ireland and marched to Cahir. The rest of the regiment was at sea for over 10 weeks before it reached Cork on 26 November and was able to rejoin. The regiment shifted its quarters to Mallow in May 1812, and then to Limerick in January 1813. In June 1813 it sailed back to England, landing at Plymouth and remaining in Devonshire.

After Napoleon abdicated on 6 April 1814, the militia began to be stood down and both regiments were disembodied. However, on Napoleon's escape from Elba, the West Norfolks were assembled by beat of drum in April 1815, preparatory to being re-embodied in June. After Napoleon's final defeat at Waterloo the bulk of the British Army was engaged in occupation duties in France, and the West Norfolks volunteered for service in Ireland. On 15 September the regiment, 800 strong, marched to Harwich, where it embarked. It was stationed at Clonmel and Templemore until it returned to England in April 1816. Once again, George Borrow accompanied his father (now a captain) on this service and dramatised it in Lavengro.

The regiment returned to Norwich on 11 May 1816 and so was on hand to help put down the riots that broke out in the city in June. The regiment was finally disembodied on 27 June. The East Norfolks were not embodied during the Waterloo campaign.

=== Long peace ===
After Waterloo there was another long peace. The militia was mustered for training in 1820, 1821, 1825, 1826 and 1831, but not thereafter, and it was suspended by the Militia Act 1829. Although officers continued to be commissioned into the militia, the permanent staffs of sergeants and drummers (who were occasionally used to maintain public order) were progressively reduced.

== 1852 reforms ==
The Militia of the United Kingdom was revived by the Militia Act 1852 (15 & 16 Vict. c. 50), enacted during a renewed period of international tension. As before, units were raised and administered on a county basis, and filled by voluntary enlistment (although conscription by means of the Militia Ballot might be used if the counties failed to meet their quotas). Training was for 56 days on enlistment, then for 21–28 days per year, during which the men received full army pay. Under the act, Militia units could be embodied by royal proclamation for full-time home defence service in three circumstances:

1. 'Whenever a state of war exists between Her Majesty and any foreign power'.
2. 'In all cases of invasion or upon imminent danger thereof'.
3. 'In all cases of rebellion or insurrection'.

The West and East Norfolk Regiments were resuscitated, the senior officers remaining in post but a number of former Regular Army officers were appointed as company commanders, along with a roster of new junior officers. The Militia Act 1852 introduced Artillery Militia units in addition to the traditional infantry regiments. Their role was to man coastal defences and fortifications, relieving the Royal Artillery (RA) for active service.

=== West and East Norfolk Militia ===
In April 1853 612 men of the West Norfolk Militia, under Col. the Earl of Orford, mustered in Norwich at the Swan Hotel. During this muster they were subjected to verbal attacks by members of the Peace Society and "Liberals". 571 out of the 612 men enrolled in the East Norfolk Militia assembled at Great Yarmouth on the same date under Col. the Hon. Berkeley Wodehouse. It was noted that, "Their appearance was much more respectable than might have been expected, and many of those who were prepared to ridicule them acknowledged that they were a much better class than they expected."

The two infantry regiments were called out for 28 days' training on 25 April 1854. The East Norfolk Militia was presented with new colours on 16 May at a public ceremony held on South Denes, Great Yarmouth, attended by 10,000 persons, including civic dignitaries. The day concluded with a ball held at Great Yarmouth Town Hall, which had been decorated with the new colours, mirrors and stars formed of bayonets. These colours were still being carried in 1898. The men were sent home at the completion of the training, though some had expected them to be kept embodied in view of the outbreak of the Crimean War.

An order for the provision of Militia barracks at Great Yarmouth was made in 1853. Originally it was intended to base all three regiments of the Norfolk Militia at Great Yarmouth, but on 25 February the original resolution was rescinded, and it was agreed "that the present Committee be empowered to receive estimates and tenders for building barracks for one regiment of Militia at Norwich, and for one regiment of Militia and one regiment of artillery at Yarmouth, on such plans as they may think best suited for the purpose." In 1855 it was noted that the government intended to convert the arsenal at Yarmouth to create Gorleston Barracks, a facility for the two field officers, 15 sergeants and 408 men of the East Norfolk Militia, with the old Great Yarmouth barracks having been converted into an Admiralty hospital.

=== Norfolk Artillery Militia ===
Period print of the Prince of Wales reviewing the Norfolk Artillery Militia at Great Yarmouth, June 1872.

Period print of the Prince of Wales attending a Mess Dinner at the Yarmouth New Assembly Rooms.

The Norfolk Artillery Militia was formed under a royal warrant dated 2 May 1853 and comprised two companies with a total establishment of 183 all ranks. Detachments of men were transferred from the West and East Norfolk regiments (52 from the latter) and the remainder were new recruits. The unit was based at Yarmouth in the former Royal Navy barracks. It was embodied during the Crimean War and Indian Mutiny and had expanded to six companies by 1859. Charles, 5th Lord Suffield, formerly of the 7th Hussars and a friend of Edward, Prince of Wales, was appointed Lt-Col Commandant in 1866. In May 1872 the Prince of Wales was appointed Honorary Colonel of the corps and in November 1875 it changed its title to the Prince of Wales's Own Norfolk Artillery Militia. In the following years a number of the Prince's connections served in the corps. Number 1 Battery was designated 'The Queen's Battery' in May 1890.

The Artillery Militia was reorganised into 11 divisions of garrison artillery in 1882, and the Norfolk unit became the 2nd Brigade, Eastern Division, RA. from 1 April 1882. This was changed to Norfolk Artillery, Eastern Division, RA on 1 July 1889.

The Prince of Wales's Norfolk Artillery was embodied for home service from 2 May to 13 October 1900 during the Second Boer War, and also provided a Special Service Company, which saw active service in South Africa from May 1900 to June 1902.

In 1902 the Norfolk Artillery Militia became the Prince of Wales's Own Norfolk Royal Garrison Artillery (Militia). Under the Haldane Reforms of 1908 the plan was to convert the RGA (M) into Special Reserve units of the Royal Field Artillery. Although the majority of the officers and men accepted transfer to the PoW Own Norfolk Royal Field Reserve Artillery on 28 April 1908, all these units were disbanded in March 1909.

=== Crimean War and Indian Mutiny ===
During 1854 an expeditionary force was sent to the Crimea and at the end of the year the militia began to be called out for home defence. All three Norfolk regiments were embodied on 27 December 1854. Because of the way the 1852 Act had been drafted, a number of men enlisted before April 1854 had to be released, reducing the effective strength of the regiments. However, an increased bounty induced many of them to re-enlist.

In June 1855 the West Norfolk Militia was presented with new Colours by the Countess of Albemarle. The Earl of Orford (now fulfilling the role of Honorary Colonel of the regiment) replied to her speech, and the colours were then trooped and the regiment marched past. Early next month the West Norfolk Militia went to Aldershot Camp and then to Fermoy Barracks in Ireland. With the ending of the war the regiment returned to Norwich in June 1856, where it was disembodied the following month.

In February 1856, the East Norfolk Militia left Great Yarmouth by train, travelling to a hutted encampment at Colchester. At Colchester railway station they were met by the band of the Essex Rifle Militia. The strength at this time was recorded as 1 Major (Lacon), 13 officers, 3 staff sergeants and 415 men. On 23 April the units at Colchester, including the East Norfolk Militia, were reviewed by Prince Albert. The war had ended on 30 March with the Treaty of Paris and In June the warrant for disembodying the militia was issued. The East Norfolks returned to Great Yarmouth to be paid off.

The West Norfolk Militia was called out again for garrison duty when much of the army was sent to quell the Indian Mutiny. It was embodied on 10 November 1857, about 700 strong, and was stationed at Chester, Liverpool and Stockport. In April 1858 the regiment returned to Norwich and was disembodied shortly afterwards. Unlike the West Norfolks, the regiment was not re-embodied during the Indian Mutiny.

After 1857 the regiments were called out annually for their routine training. On 20 May 1861, the East Norfolk Militia were involved in a serious military riot at Yarmouth, against men of the Royal Artillery. It was reported in the Norfolk Chronicle that this riot included the use of belts and stones, and that 200 Artillerymen, armed with swords and knives issued from the arsenal, had to be prevented from joining the fight by "persuasion and threats". The report says that officers from both corps were involved in ending the riot, and that guards had to be placed on the bridge to keep the Artillery out of Yarmouth and the Militia from crossing into Southtown.

== Cardwell and Childers Reforms ==
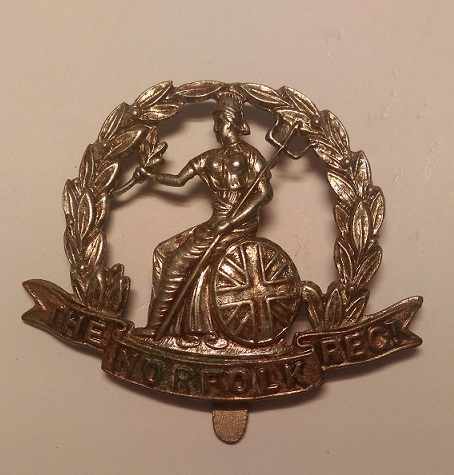
Cap badge of the Norfolk Regiment, including Britannia.

Under the 'Localisation of the Forces' scheme introduced by the Cardwell Reforms of 1872, militia regiments were brigaded with their local regular and Volunteer battalions. Sub-District No 31 (County of Norfolk) set up its depot at Gorleston Barracks at Great Yarmouth, the headquarters of the Norfolk Artillery Militia. It comprised:

- 1st and 2nd Battalions, 9th (Norfolk) Regiment of Foot
- West Norfolk Militia at Norwich
- East Norfolk Militia at Yarmouth
- 1st (City of Norwich) Norfolk Rifle Volunteer Corps
- 2nd (Great Yarmouth) Norfolk Rifle Volunteer Corps
- 3rd Norfolk Rifle Volunteer Corps at East Dereham
- 4th Norfolk Rifle Volunteer Corps at Norwich

Militia battalions now had a large cadre of permanent staff (about 30) and a number of the officers were former Regulars. Around a third of the recruits and many young officers went on to join the Regular Army. The Militia Reserve introduced in 1867 consisted of present and former militiamen who undertook to serve overseas in case of war. They were called out in 1878 during the international crisis caused by the Russo-Turkish War.

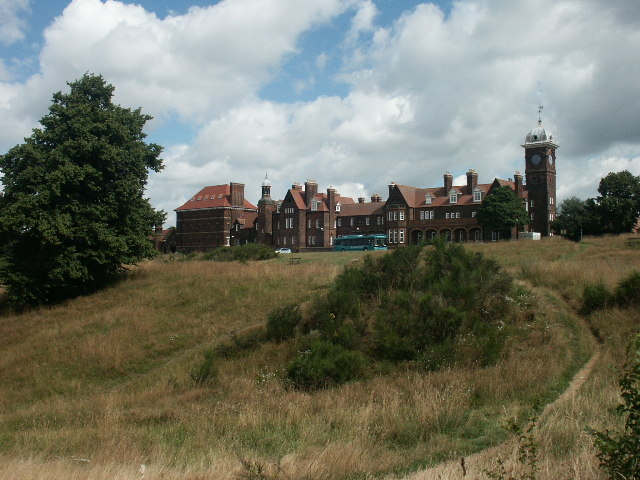
Britannia Barracks, Norwich, now part of Norwich Prison.

The Childers Reforms of 1881 completed the Cardwell process by converting the linked regular regiments into county regiments and incorporating the militia battalions into them:

- 3rd (1st Norfolk Militia) Battalion, Norfolk Regiment
- 4th (2nd Norfolk Militia) Battalion, Norfolk Regiment – not to be confused with 4th Battalion, Norfolk Regiment (Territorial Force) of 1908–67

The Norfolk Regimental depot moved to the new Britannia Barracks at Mousehold Heath outside Norwich when that facility was opened in 1887. Both militia battalions were now based there.

=== Second Boer War ===
After the disasters of Black Week at the start of the Second Boer War in December 1899, most of the regular army was sent to South Africa, and the militia were embodied to replace them for garrison duty. The 3rd Norfolks was embodied on 25 January 1900 and the 4th Bn from 1 May 1900 to 17 July 1901. The 3rd Bn volunteered for overseas service and served in South Africa from 21 March 1900 to April 1902. It spent most of the two years manning blockhouse lines that prevented Boer movement. On return to the UK it was disembodied on 11 April 1902 and was awarded the Battle Honour South Africa 1900–02.

The Prince of Wales's Norfolk Artillery was embodied for home service from 2 May to 13 October 1900, and also provided a Special Service Company, which saw active service in South Africa from May 1900 to June 1902.

== Special Reserve ==
Under the sweeping Haldane Reforms of 1908, the Militia was replaced by the Special Reserve (SR), a semi-professional force whose role was to provide reinforcement drafts for Regular units serving overseas in wartime. The 3rd Bn became the 3rd (Reserve) Bn, Norfolk Regiment on 31 May 1908, but the 4th Bn was disbanded on 15 July that year.

In 1902 the Norfolk Artillery Militia had become the Prince of Wales's Own Norfolk Royal Garrison Artillery (Militia). Under the Haldane scheme the plan was to convert the RGA (M) into SR units of the Royal Field Artillery. Although the majority of the officers and men accepted transfer to the PoW Own Norfolk Royal Field Reserve Artillery on 28 April 1908, all these units were disbanded in March 1909.

=== World War I ===
On the outbreak of World War I on 4 August 1914 the 3rd (Reserve) Bn was embodied at Britannia Barracks. The first task of the permanent staff, along with the depot staff, was to call up, clothe and equip the Army Reservists. On 8 August the SR battalion was mobilised and next day it went to its war station at Felixstowe where it formed part of an SR brigade in the Harwich Defences. As well as defence tasks, the battalion's role was to equip Special Reservists, new recruits and returning wounded and send them as reinforcement drafts to the regular battalions of the Norfolks serving overseas. At times the strength of the 3rd Bn reached 100 officers and 3000 ORs. The 10th Bn was formed alongside it in the Harwich Garrison, initially as a service battalion but later as a reserve unit to supply drafts to the 'Kitchener's Army' battalions of the Norfolks that were being raised. 3rd Norfolks spent the whole war in the Harwich Garrison, sending drafts to the fighting battalions, whereas 10th Norfolks was at Colchester Garrison, before returning to Harwich and being transferred to the Training Reserve.

=== Postwar ===
The disembodied SR resumed its old title of Militia in 1921 but like most militia units the 3rd Norfolks remained in abeyance after World War I. By the outbreak of World War II in 1939, no officers remained listed for the battalion. The Militia was formally disbanded in April 1953. The Norfolk Regiment (Royal Norfolk Regiment from 1936) amalgamated with the Suffolk Regiment in 1959 to form the 1st East Anglian Regiment, later the 1st Battalion Royal Anglian Regiment.

== Heritage and ceremonial ==
=== Uniforms and insignia ===
When the Norfolk Militia regiments were mustered in 1690 they were clothed in different coloured coats, and the regiments were known by those colours (see above). By 1759 the English militia had all adopted the red coat of the British Army. When the Norfolk Militia paraded at Kensington Palace in 1759 the uniform was red with black facings. An early sketch by Lord Townshend, published in "A Plan of Discipline Composed for the Use of the Militia of the County of Norfolk" in 1759, shows a Private wearing a simple uniform of cocked hat, jacket, breeches and shoes worn without gaiters. A cross belt and waist belt, with bayonet, are worn over the single-breasted jacket, with the latter secured by a single button close to the collar, two at the chest and three at the waist.

Long boots were discontinued, except for mounted officers, on 12 April 1814. On 22 June 1820 epaulettes, buttons and ornaments of dress were changed from gold to silver, although serving officers were permitted to retain their old style of uniform unless called on for actual service. In January 1831 the old uniform was finally discontinued, with orders that all uniforms must meet the latest King's Regulations and include black velvet and silver epaulettes.

The West Norfolks retained red facings until at least 1780. A print of about 1780 (see above) showing a drummer of the regiment wearing a white coat with black facings. Normally drummers wore 'reversed' colours, ie a coat of the facing colour, faced red; however, when the facing colour was black or red, the drummer's coat was white, with the normal facing colour. The West Norfolks changed to white facings before 1846, the East Norfolks following in 1852. The badge of both regiments was the Coat of arms of the City of Norwich, with a castle above a lion of England. On 5 June 1882 they adopted the 'Britannia' badge of the Norfolk Regiment, gold lace being restored to the officers. The Norfolk Regiment, including its militia battalions, regained its traditional yellow facings in 1905.

The buttons of the 1st (West) Norfolk Militia carried the design of an eight-pointed star with '1 NM' in the centre. The short-lived 3rd Norfolk Militia had a crown over 3 above NORFOLK. Between 1833 and 1855 the officers' coatee buttons of the West Norfolks incorporated the precedence number '39'. The 3rd West Norfolk Local Militia wore a button with a castle within a crowned circle bearing the wording '3D WT NORFOLK LOCAL MILITIA'. The officers' shoulder belt plate carried the Roman numeral 'III' above the entwined letters 'WNLM' surrounded by a crowned garter bearing the motto 'HONI SOIT QUI MAL Y PENSE'.

The uniform of the Norfolk Artillery Militia was similar to that of the Regular Royal Artillery, in blue with red facings and trouser stripe, but with silver/white lace and piping instead of gold/yellow. The officers' helmet plate incorporated the arms of Norwich until 1860 when busbies replaced the helmets. When helmet plates were reintroduced in 1878 they bore that standard Eastern Division, Royal Artillery pattern.

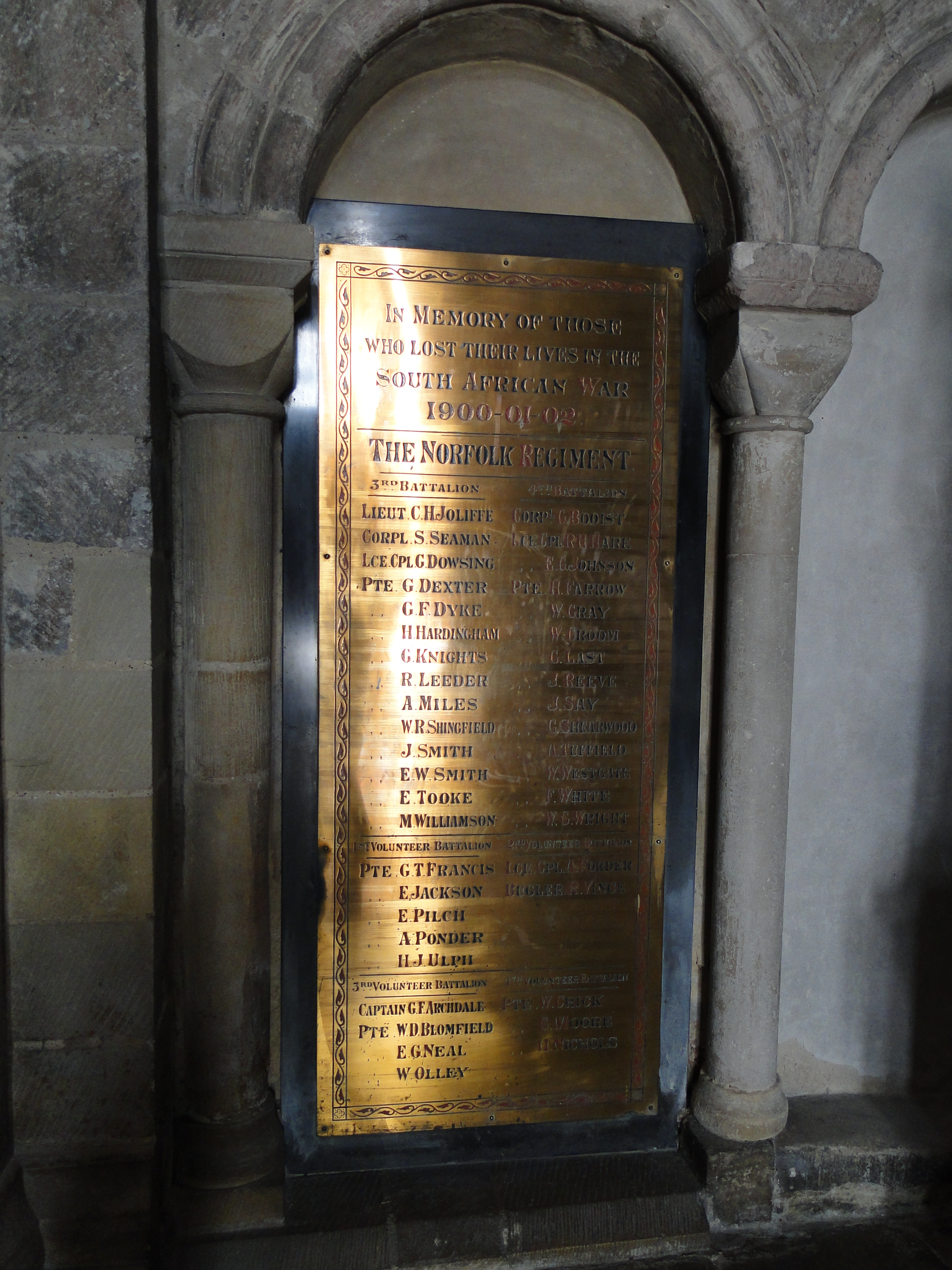
Boer War Memorial in Norwich Cathedral to the militia and volunteer battalions of the Norfolk Regiment.

=== Memorials ===
The names of the officers and men of militia and volunteer battalions of the Norfolk Regiment who died during the Second Boer War are engraved on a brass plate in Norwich Cathedral.

=== Precedence ===
In the Seven Years War militia regiments camped together took precedence according to the order in which they had arrived. During the War of American Independence the counties were given an order of precedence determined by ballot each year. For the Norfolk Militia the positions were:

- 28th on 1 June 1778
- 34th on 12 May 1779
- 9th on 6 May 1780
- 7th on 28 April 1781
- 33rd on 7 May 1782

The militia order of precedence balloted for in 1793 (Norfolk was 4th) remained in force throughout the French Revolutionary War: this covered all the regiments in the county. Another ballot for precedence took place at the start of the Napoleonic War, when Norfolk was 46th.This order continued until 1833. In that year the King drew the lots for individual regiments and the resulting list remained in force with minor amendments until the end of the militia. The regiments raised before the peace of 1763 took the first 47 places: the West Norfolk was 39th and the East Norfolk was 40th. Although most regiments paid little notice to the additional number, the West Norfolk Militia did wear the numeral 39 on its buttons. When the Militia Artillery was formed its regiments took precedence alphabetically; Norfolk was 22nd.

=== Notable members ===
- Gen John Money began his career in the Norfolk Militia before being commissioned into the Regular Army in 1762. One of the earliest English aeronauts, making two ascents in 1785, and, in 1803, he advocated the use of balloons for military purposes.

== East Norfolk Militia (re-enactment group) ==
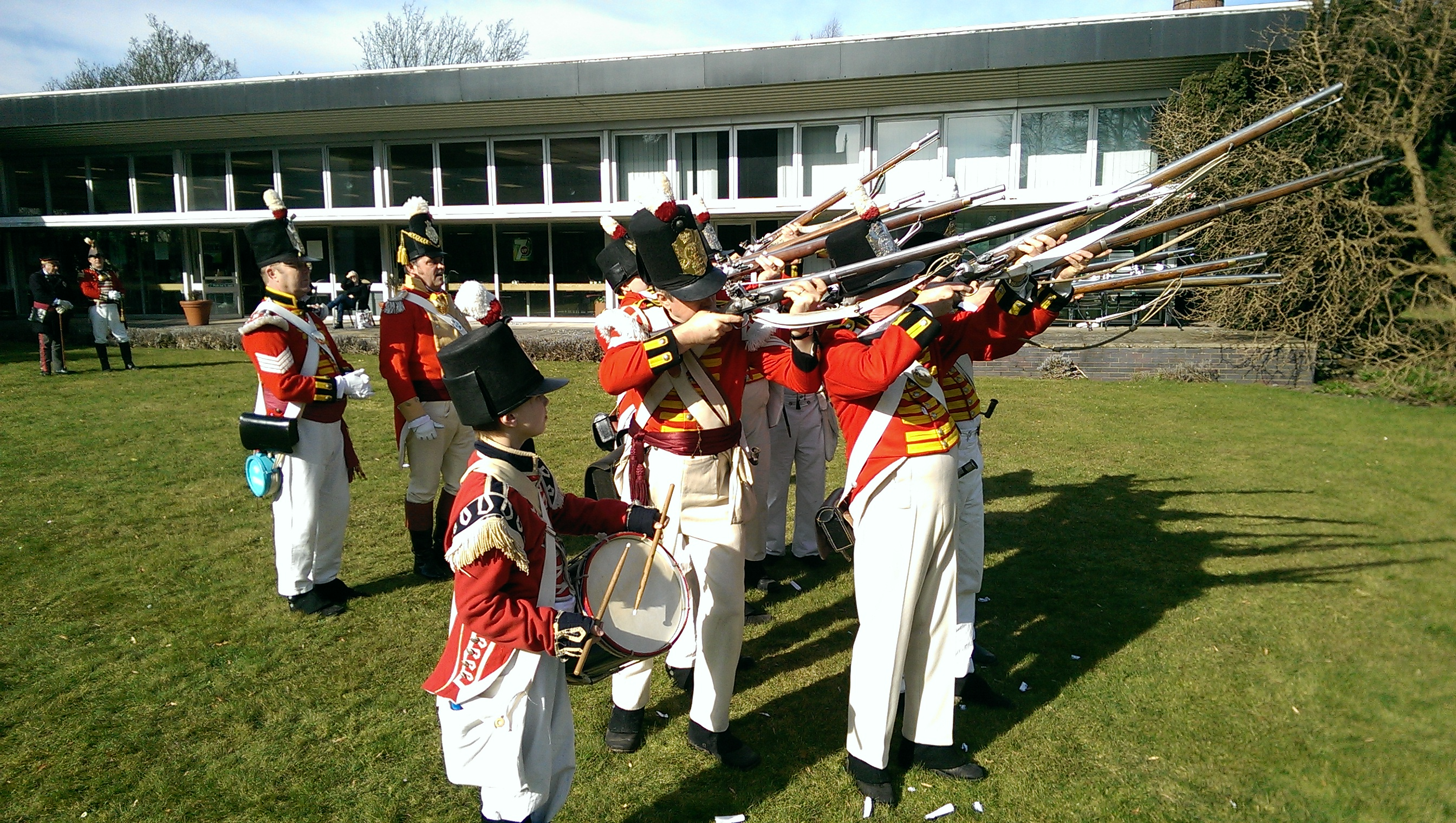
Re-enactors wearing the later (pre-Waterloo) pattern uniform of the East Norfolk Militia.

The East Norfolk Militia is a Napoleonic era re-enactment group, formed in 2000 to help celebrate the bicentenary of Horatio Nelson, 1st Viscount Nelson being awarded the Freedom of the borough of Great Yarmouth. In 2005 they took part in events to mark the bicentenary of the Battle of Trafalgar at the Royal Norfolk Show. They perform ceremonial and guard duties for events in and around East Anglia. in addition to taking part in living history events, and took part in the bicentenary re-enactment of the Battle of Waterloo.

== See also ==
- Norfolk Trained Bands
- Militia (Great Britain)
- Militia (United Kingdom)
- Special Reserve
- West Norfolk Militia
- East Norfolk Militia
- Norfolk Artillery Militia

== Bibliography ==
- W. Y. Baldry, 'Order of Precedence of Militia Regiments', Journal of the Society for Army Historical Research, Vol 15, No 57 (Spring 1936), pp. 5–16. JSTOR 44227944.
- Burke's Peerage, Baronetage and Knightage, 100th Edn, London, 1953.
- W. Y. Carman, 'Militia Uniforms 1780', Journal of the Society for Army Historical Research, Vol 36, No 147 (September 1958), pp. 108–109. JSTOR 44226867
- W. Y. Carman, 'Philip J. de Loutherbourg and the Camp at Warley, 1778'. Journal of the Society for Army Historical Research, Vol 71, No 288 (Winter 1993), pp. 276–7. JSTOR 44224825
- John Chambers, A General History of the County of Norfolk, Vol I, Norwich: John Stacy 1829.
- C. G. Cruickshank, Elizabeth's Army, 2nd Edn, Oxford: Oxford University Press, 1966.
- Col John K. Dunlop, The Development of the British Army 1899–1914, London: Methuen, 1938.
- Mark Charles Fissel, The Bishops' Wars: Charles I's campaigns against Scotland 1638–1640, Cambridge: Cambridge University Press, 1994, ISBN 0-521-34520-0.
- Sir John Fortescue, A History of the British Army, Vol I, 2nd Ed., London: Macmillan, 1910.
- Sir John Fortescue, A History of the British Army, Vol II, London: Macmillan, 1899.
- Sir John Fortescue, A History of the British Army, Vol III, 2nd Edn, London: Macmillan, 1911.
- Sir John Fortescue, A History of the British Army, Vol V, London: Macmillan, 1910.
- J. B. M. Frederick, Lineage Book of British Land Forces 1660–1978, Vol I, Wakefield: Microform Academic, 1984, ISBN 1-85117-007-3.
- J. B. M. Frederick, Lineage Book of British Land Forces 1660–1978, Vol II, Wakefield: Microform Academic, 1984, ISBN 1-85117-009-X.
- Harvey, Col. Sir Charles (1898). History of the 4th Battalion Norfolk Regiment (Late East Norfolk Militia). Norwich: Jarrold & Sons.
- Col George Jackson Hay, An Epitomized History of the Militia (The Constitutional Force), London: United Service Gazette, 1905/Ray Westlake Military Books, 1987, ISBN 0-9508530-7-0/Uckfield: Naval & Military Press, 2015 ISBN 978-1-78331-171-2.
- Brig Charles Herbert, 'Coxheath Camp, 1778–1779', Journal of the Society for Army Historical Research, Vol 45, No 183 (Autumn 1967), pp. 129–148. JSTOR 44226981
- Richard Holmes, Soldiers: Army Lives and Loyalties from Redcoats to Dusty Warriors, London: HarperPress, 2011, ISBN 978-0-00-722570-5.
- Jeremy Ive, 'The Local Dimensions of Defence: the Standing Army and Militia in Norfolk, Suffolk and Essex, 1649–1660', Cambridge University PhD Thesis, 1987.
- Brig E. A. James, British Regiments 1914–18, London: Samson Books, 1978, ISBN 0-906304-03-2/Uckfield: Naval & Military Press, 2001, ISBN 978-1-84342-197-9.
- Colm Kerrigan, George Borrow's Journey Through Cork in 1815, Lavengro Press.
- Roger Knight, Britain Against Napoleon: The Organization of Victory 1793–1815, London: Allen Lane, 2013/Penguin, 2014, ISBN 978-0-14-103894-0.
- Norman E. H. Litchfield, The Militia Artillery 1852–1909 (Their Lineage, Uniforms and Badges), Nottingham: Sherwood Press, 1987, ISBN 0-9508205-1-2.
- J. Matchett, The Norfolk and Norwich Remembrancer and Vade-Mecum, 2nd Ed., Norwich: Matchett & Stevenson, 1822.
- M.J.D.C., 'Standing Orders', Journal of the Society for Army Historical Research, Vol 4, No 15 (January–March 1925), pp. 6–7. JSTOR 44219220.
- 'Militia Regiments of Great Britain', Journal of the Society for Army Historical Research, Vol 12, No 45 (Spring 1933), pp. 45–49. JSTOR 44219502.
- Murphy, Charles Cecil Rowe (1928). The History of the Suffolk Regiment, 1914-1927. London: Hutchinson. OCLC 13429897.
- Ranald Nicholson, Edward III and the Scots, Oxford: Oxford University Press, 1965.
- H. G. Parkyn, 'English Militia Regiments 1757–1935: Their Badges and Buttons', Journal of the Society for Army Historical Research, Vol 15, No 60 (Winter 1936), pp. 216–248. JSTOR 442196788
- F. Loraine Petre, The History of the Norfolk Regiment 1685–1918, Vol I, 30th June 1685 to 3 August 1914, Norwich: Jarrold, nd.
- F. Loraine Petre, The History of the Norfolk Regiment 1685–1918, Vol II, 3 August 1914 to 31st December, 1918, Norwich: Jarrold.
- Arthur Sleigh, The Royal Militia and Yeomanry Cavalry Army List, April 1850, London: British Army Despatch Press, 1850/Uckfield: Naval and Military Press, 1991, ISBN 978-1-84342-410-9.
- Edward M. Spiers, The Army and Society 1815–1914, London: Longmans, 1980, ISBN 0-582-48565-7.
- Rev Percy Sumner, 'Militia Regiments in 1690', Journal of the Society for Army Historical Research, Vol 28, No 116 (Winter 1950), p. 186. JSTOR 44222063
- Thomas James Walker, The Depot for Prisoners at Norman Cross Huntingdonshire, 1796 to 1816.
- War Office, A List of the Officers of the Militia, the Gentlemen & Yeomanry Cavalry, and Volunteer Infantry of the United Kingdom, 11th Ed., London: War Office, 14 October 1805/Uckfield: Naval and Military Press, 2005, ISBN 978-1-84574-207-2.
- J. R. Western, The English Militia in the Eighteenth Century: The Story of a Political Issue 1660–1802, London: Routledge & Kegan Paul, 1965.
- William White, History, Gazetteer, and Directory of Norfolk, and the City and County of the City of Norwich: Comprising, Under a Lucid Arrangement of Subjects, a General Survey of the County of Norfolk, and the Diocese of Norwich..., 1836.
- A Plan of Discipline composed for the use of the Militia of the County of Norfolk

=== External links ===
- Steve Brown, 'Home Guard: The Forces to Meet the Expected French Invasion/1 September 1805' at The Napoleon Series (archived at the Wayback Machine).
- David Plant, British Civil Wars, Commonwealth & Protectorate, 1638–1660 (The BCW Project) Regimental Wiki.
- British Military Buttons
- National Army Museum Online Collection

=== Further reading ===
- Grave marker for James Randall, East Norfolk Regiment of Militia, 1858
- Unknown officer of the Norfolk Militia at ArtUK
