= Peter Gleane =

Peter Gleane may refer to:

- Sir Peter Gleane (MP for Norwich) (1564–1633) MP for Norwich
- Sir Peter Gleane, 1st Baronet (1619–1695), MP for Norfolk
- Sir Peter Gleane, 3rd Baronet (c. 1672–c. 1735), of the Gleane baronets
- Sir Peter Gleane, 4th Baronet (c. 1696–1745), of the Gleane baronets

== See also ==
- Gleane (surname)
