= Sir Philip Wodehouse, 3rd Baronet =

English politician

Sir Philip Wodehouse, 3rd Baronet (24 July 1608 – 6 May 1681), was an English politician who sat in the House of Commons at various times between 1654 and 1660.

Wodehouse was the son of Sir Thomas Wodehouse, 2nd Baronet, and his wife Blanche Carey, daughter of John Carey, 3rd Baron Hunsdon. In 1654, he was elected Member of Parliament for Norfolk in the First Protectorate Parliament. He was re-elected MP for Norfolk in 1656 for the Second Protectorate Parliament. He succeeded to the baronetcy on the death of his father on 18 March 1658. In 1660 he was elected MP for Thetford in the Convention Parliament.

Wodehouse married Lucy Cotton, daughter of Sir Thomas Cotton, 2nd Baronet. His son Thomas predeceased him. He died in May 1681, aged 72, and was succeeded in the baronetcy by his grandson, John. Lady Wodehouse died in June 1684.

Sir Philip Wodehouse is known to have engaged in correspondence with Sir Thomas Browne and employed John Jenkins as music-master at Kimberley.

Parliament of England
| Preceded by William Burton; Tobias Frere; Robert Jermy; Henry King; Ralph Wolmer | Member of Parliament for Norfolk; 1654–1658; With: Philip Bedingfield 1654–1656; William D'Oyly; Tobias Frere 1654–1656; Ralph Hare; Sir John Hobart, Bt. Thomas Sotherton; Thomas Weld 1654–1656; Robert Welton; Robert Wood; John Buxton 1656–1658; Charles Fleetwood 1656–1658; Sir Horatio Townshend, Bt. 1656–1658 | Succeeded by William D'Oyly; Sir Horatio Townshend, Bt. |
| Preceded by William Stene; Robert Steward | Member of Parliament for Thetford; 1660; With: Robert Paston | Succeeded by Sir Allen Apsley; William Gawdy |
Baronetage of England
| Preceded by Thomas Wodehouse | Baronet of Wilberhall; 1658–1681 | Succeeded by John Wodehouse |
