= Philip Bedingfield =

Philip Bedingfield (died 1660) was an English landowner and politician who sat in the House of Commons in 1654.

Bedingfield was the son of Thomas Bedingfield of Darsham, Suffolk and his wife Dorothy Southwell, daughter of John Southwell of Barham. He was admitted at Emmanuel College, Cambridge on 1 May 1609, and at Gray's Inn on 17 February 1611. In 1636 he inherited the estate of Darsham on the death of his father but appears to have settled at Ditchingham, Norfolk.

In 1654, Bedingfield was elected Member of Parliament for Norfolk in the First Protectorate Parliament.

Bedingfield died in 1660 and was buried at Ditchingham on 6 March 1660.

Parliament of England
Preceded by Robert Jermy (?); Tobias Frere; Ralph Wolmer; Henry King; William Burton	Member of Parliament for Norfolk; 1654; With: Sir John Hobart; Sir William D'Oyly; Sir Ralph Hare, Bt; Thomas Weld; Robert Wilton; Thomas Sotherton; Philip Wodehouse; Robert Wood (senior); Tobias Frere	Succeeded by Sir John Hobart; Charles Fleetwood; Sir William D'Oyly; Sir Ralph Hare, Bt; Sir Horatio Townsend; Colonel Robert Wilton; Philip Wodehouse; Colonel Robert Wood; John Buxton; Thomas Sotherton
