= Nevill Catlin =

Sir Nevill Catlin (1634–1702) (aliter Catlyn, Catelyn, etc.) of Kirby Cane in Norfolk and of Wingfield Castle in Suffolk, England, was a landowner and member of Parliament from a Norfolk family long active in local and national affairs.

== Origins ==
Baptised on 3 March 1634, he was the eldest surviving son of Richard Catlin IV (1583–1662) of Kirby Cane, MP, by his second wife Dorothy Neville (1605–1672), a daughter of landowner and politician Sir Henry Nevill (d.1615) of Billingbear, by his wife Anne Killigrew, a daughter of Henry Killigrew. Sir Nevill Catlin's grandfather Thomas Catlin (c.1550-1636; a younger son of Richard Catlin II (1520–1556), MP for Norwich in Norfolk) had purchased the manor of Kirby Cane in 1604. The first cousin of Sir Nevill Catlin's father was Irish judge Sir Nathaniel Catelyn.

== Early life ==
His father had supported the King in the Civil War and had been disabled from sitting in Parliament in 1644 and suffered sequestration of his estate, but was discharged without fine in 1647. His elder half-brother Thomas Catlin died fighting for the royalist side in the Second Battle of Newbury in 1644. His elder half-sister Mary Catlin married Sir Edward Ward, 1st Baronet, of Bixley. In 1650 he entered King's College, Cambridge.

== Marriages and issue ==
He married three times: in 1658 in London he married as his first wife Doraemon Bedingfield, a daughter of the judge and politician Sir Thomas Bedingfield by his wife Elizabeth Hoskins, a daughter of Charles Hoskins of Oxted. After her early death he married secondly Elizabeth Houghton, a daughter of Robert Houghton of Ranworth by his wife Elizabeth Corbet (d.1681), a daughter of Sir John Corbet, 1st Baronet, of Sprowston. Thirdly he married Mary Blois, sister of Sir Charles Blois, 1st Baronet and daughter of Sir William Blois of Grundisburgh by his first wife Martha Brooke, a daughter of Sir Robert Brooke of Cockfield. His third wife survived him and remarried to Sir Charles Turner, 1st Baronet, of Warham. From the first two marriages there were three sons and a daughter, but none lived long.

== Career ==
At the Restoration of the Monarchy in 1660 he joined the Norfolk militia, initially as a captain of cavalry and rising later to major. In 1661 he was appointed a commissioner for tax assessment for both Norfolk and Suffolk. He was knighted in 1662, having inherited his paternal estates of Kirby Cane and Wingfield Castle. In 1668 he was appointed a justice of the peace for Norfolk and in 1680 for Suffolk, also serving as a deputy lieutenant for Norfolk in 1676 and for Suffolk in 1680.

In addition to these local activities he entered national politics, first standing at a by-election for the county seat of Norfolk in 1675 but losing after a considerable outlay. However he won the seat in 1679, after a bitter contest, having stood as a supporter of the crown in the first general election of 1679. Although his election was declared void, he was re-elected a fortnight later. In the second general election of 1679, he stood reluctantly and lost after a lacklustre campaign.

In the 1685 general election he was unopposed as one of the two members for the city of Norwich in Norfolk, and was listed among those opposed to King James II, who had espoused the Roman Catholic religion. A moderately active member, he was appointed to four unimportant committees. Unsympathetic to the political ambitions of the Catholic party, he opposed the repeal of the penal laws against Catholics and dissenters but was not against some relaxation. As an opponent of the King's absolute rule, he was stripped of his local offices, and when these were restored in October 1688 he refused to sit next to Catholic office holders. In the Convention Parliament of 1689 he was fairly active, being appointed to 15 committees.

He did not stand in the 1690 general election, retiring from national politics. Dying in July 1702, he was buried at Kirby Cane and was succeeded by his younger brother Richard Catlin V (1636 – 1711), who never married.

Parliament of England
Preceded by Sir John Hobart, Bt; Sir Robert Kemp, Bt	Member of Parliament for Norfolk; 10 Feb 1679 – 21 Apr 1679; With: Sir Christopher Calthorpe	Succeeded by Self; Sir John Hobart, Bt
Preceded by Self; Sir Christopher Calthorpe	Member of Parliament for Norfolk; 5 May 1679 – 25 Aug 1679; With: Sir John Hobart, Bt	Succeeded by Sir Peter Gleane, 1st Baronet; Sir John Hobart, Bt
Preceded by William Paston; Augustine Briggs	Member of Parliament for Norwich; 6 Apr 1685 – 11 Jan 1689; With: Robert Paston	Succeeded by Self; Thomas Blofield
Preceded by Self; Robert Paston	Member of Parliament for Norwich; 11 Jan 1689; With: Thomas Blofield	Succeeded by Hugh Bokenham; Thomas Blofield
