= William D'Oyly =

William D'Oyly may refer to:

- Sir William D'Oyly, 1st Baronet (1614–1677), English politician
- Sir William D'Oyly, 2nd Baronet, Teller of the Receipt of the Exchequer, of the D'Oyly baronets
