= Sir John Hobart, 3rd Baronet =

English politician (1628–1683)

- Born: 20 March 1628; Ditchingham, Norfolk
- Died: 22 August 1683 (aged 55)
- Education: landowner and nobleman
- Children: 7, including Henry

Sir John Hobart, 3rd Baronet (20 March 1628 – 22 August 1683) was an English landowner and politician who sat in the House of Commons at various times between 1654 and 1683.

Hobart was the son of Sir Miles Hobart (son of Sir Henry Hobart, 1st Baronet), and his wife Frances Peyton, daughter of Sir John Peyton, 1st Baronet, and was born in Ditchingham, Norfolk. He succeeded his uncle John as baronet in 1647.

On 22 February 1650 Hobart was commissioned by the Council of State as Colonel of a foot regiment of the Norfolk Trained Bands consisting of seven companies. The regiment was called out for service during the Scottish invasion of the Third English Civil War. In 1654, Hobart was elected member of parliament for Norfolk in the First Protectorate Parliament. He was re-elected MP for Norfolk in 1656 for the Second Protectorate Parliament.

After the Restoration Hobart was appointed Sheriff of Norfolk in 1667 and was host to King Charles II of England at Blickling in 1671. He was elected again as MP for Norfolk in the Cavalier Parliament from 1673 until February 1679 and from May of the same year until his death.

His cousin Philippa, daughter of his uncle John, was his first wife, whom he married in 1647. In June 1656, Hobart married secondly Mary Hampden, daughter of John Hampden at St Giles's-in-the-Fields in London. Hobart had one son by his first wife and four sons and two daughters by his second wife.

Hobart was buried in Blickling a week after his death and was succeeded by his eldest son Henry.

Parliament of England
Preceded by Robert Jermy (?); Tobias Frere; Ralph Wolmer; Henry King; William Burton	Member of Parliament for Norfolk; 1654–56; With: Sir William D'Oyly, 1st Baronet 1654–56; Sir Ralph Hare, 1st Baronet 1654–56; Robert Wilton 1654–56; Philip Wodehouse 1654–56; Thomas Sotherton 1654–57; Robert Wood (senior) 1654–56; Philip Bedingfield 1654; Tobias Frere 1654; Thomas Weld 1654; William Buxton 1656; Charles Fleetwood 1656; Sir Horatio Townsend 1656	Succeeded by Sir Horatio Townsend; Sir William D'Oyly, 1st Baronet
Preceded by Sir Ralph Hare; The Lord Cramond	Member of Parliament for Norfolk; 1673 – February 1679; With: The Lord Cramond 1673–1675; Sir Robert Kemp 1675–1679	Succeeded by Sir Nevill Catlin; Sir Christopher Calthorpe
Preceded by Sir Nevill Catlin; Sir Christopher Calthorpe	Member of Parliament for Norfolk; May 1679–1685; With: Sir Nevill Catlin 1679; Sir Peter Gleane 1679–1685	Succeeded by Sir Thomas Hare, Bt; Sir Jacob Astley
Baronetage of England
Preceded by John Hobart	Baronet (of Intwood); 1647–1683	Succeeded by Henry Hobart
