= Thomas Gleane =

Thomas Gleane may refer to:

- Thomas Gleane of the Gleane baronets
- Thomas Gleane (MP), MP for Norwich (UK Parliament constituency)
