= Sir Ralph Hare, 1st Baronet =

English politician (1623–1672)

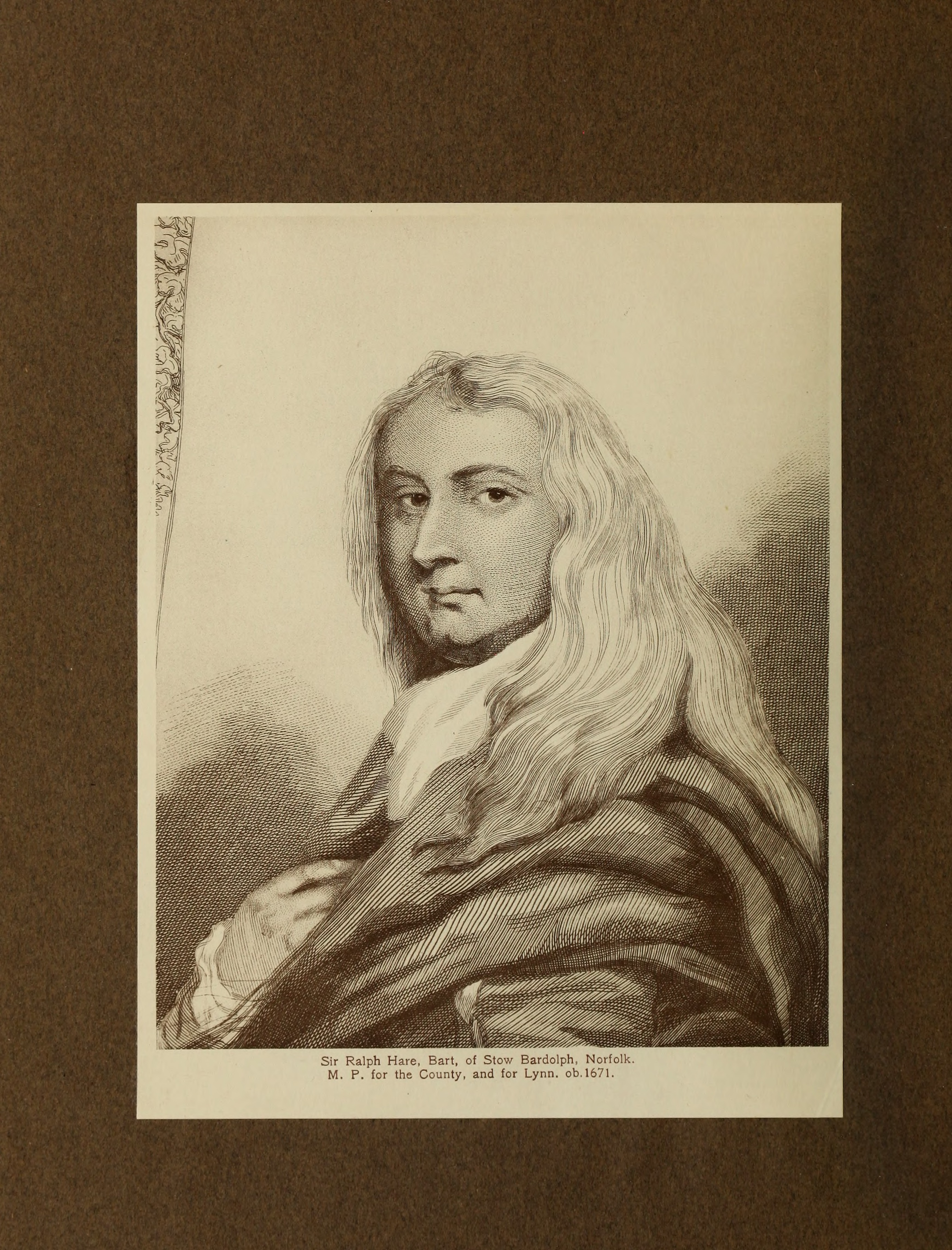
Ralph Hare (as depicted in An address from the gentry of Norfolk and Norwich to General Monck in 1660 (1913); facsimile of a manuscript in the Norwich Public Library. With an introduction by Hamon le Strange and biographical notes by Walter Rye)

Sir Ralph Hare, 1st Baronet (24 March 1623 – 28 February 1672) of Stow Bardolph, Norfolk was an English politician who sat in the House of Commons variously between 1654 and 1672.

Hare was the son of John Hare and his wife Elizabeth Coventry, only daughter of Thomas Coventry, 1st Baron Coventry. Hare was created a baronet, of Stow Bardolph in the County of Norfolk on 23 July 1641 and appointed Sheriff of Norfolk for 1650.

Hare was elected Member of Parliament (MP) for Norfolk in the First Protectorate Parliament in 1654, and then re-elected MP for Norfolk for the Second Protectorate Parliament in 1656. In 1660, he was elected MP for King's Lynn in the Convention Parliament and MP for Norfolk in 1661 for the Cavalier Parliament, sitting until his death in 1672.

Hare died at the age of 48. He married first Mary Crane, daughter of Sir Robert Crane, 1st Baronet of Chilton, Suffolk, with whom he had seven children, one of whom, Thomas, succeeded him. He married second, Vere Townshend, daughter of Roger Townsend of Raynham, Norfolk, but the marriage was childless. He married thirdly Elizabeth Chapman of Suffolk, and they had a posthumous son, John, who died in infancy.

Parliament of England
Preceded by Robert Jermy (?); Tobias Frere; Ralph Wolmer; Henry King; William Burton	Member of Parliament for Norfolk; 1654–1656; With: Sir John Hobart; Sir William D'Oyly; Robert Wilton; Philip Wodehouse; Thomas Sotherton; Robert Wood (senior); Philip Bedingfield (senior) 1654; Tobias Frere 1654; Thomas Weld 1654; John Buxton 1656; Charles Fleetwood 1656; Sir Horatio Townsend 1656	Succeeded by Sir William D'Oyly; Sir Horatio Townsend
Preceded by William Cecil; 2nd seat vacant	Member of Parliament for King's Lynn; 1660–1661; With: Edward Walpole	Succeeded by Edward Walpole; Sir William Hovell
Preceded by Sir Horatio Townshend; The Lord Cramond	Member of Parliament for Norfolk; 1661–1672; With: The Lord Cramond	Succeeded by Sir John Hobart, Bt; The Lord Cramond
Baronetage of England
New creation	Baronet (of Stow Bardolph); 1641–1672	Succeeded by Thomas Hare
