= Sir Peter Gleane, 1st Baronet =

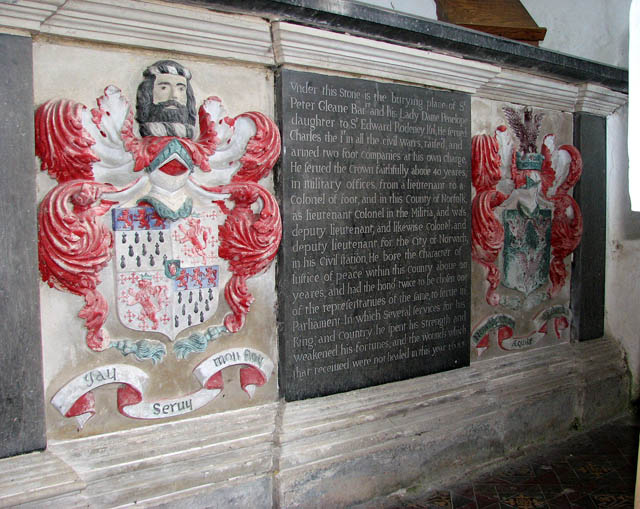
Chest tomb of Sir Peter Gleane, 1st Baronet, in St Margaret's Church, Hardwick, Norfolk

Sir Peter Gleane, 1st Baronet (c. 1619 – 7 February 1696) was a member of the East Anglian gentry and Member of the Parliament of England.

== Life ==
He was baptised in 1619, the eldest son of Thomas Gleane (died 1661) and Elizabeth Brewse. His father was descended from major merchants in Norwich during the Tudor era – Thomas' grandfather had bought Hardwick in Norfolk as his family seat and his father Peter had sat for Norwich between 1628 and 1629.

Thomas remained neutral in the Civil War, but Peter raised two foot companies for the Royalists at his own expense during the English Civil War and served in the regiment of Sir Thomas Bridges of Somerset – he is recorded as a Lieutenant of Foot around 1643, possibly rising to Captain by 1645. During the Protectorate he continued to be suspected of Royalist sympathies and around 1650 he married Penelope Rodney (died 1690), daughter of Sir Edward Rodney of Rodney Stoke - the couple had two sons and one daughter. On the English Restoration in 1660 he became a major in the militia and a lieutenant in the volunteer horse, whilst the following year he succeeded his father and the following year he became a commissioner for "loyal and indigent officers".

A baronetcy was created for him on 6 March 1666 during the 2nd Anglo-Dutch War, in which he served as Lieutenant Colonel of Lord Townshend's Regiment of Foot. He was Townshend's second in command and led the defence of Great Yarmouth. He became a commissioner for recusants in 1675 but he and Townshend were both removed from local office in 1676. During the Exclusion Crisis he actively favoured barring James, Duke of York from the succession for his Roman Catholicism. He then stood with Sir John Hobart for Norfolk in autumn 1679, gaining dissenters' support and beating the two pro-Charles II candidates. In his victory speech to the freeholders Gleane promised that:

he would faithfully discharge his trust, by truly serving the King, and his mother the Church of England as it is now established, and his country, which speech did so far displease a great many of that party who did choose him, that if he had declared this as freely before the election, I believe he never had been elected by them, for they stick not to say already they fear he will turn pensioner.

He was appointed to five committees during the Second Exclusion Parliament and was re-elected in 1681. This second election finally broke his finances, however, and in 1682 he erected his own tomb in the chancel of the church at Hardwick, though he was never buried in it. It is inscribed:

He served the crown faithfully above 40 years in military offices. ... In his civil status he bore the character of a justice of the peace within this county above 20 years, and had the honour twice to be chosen one of the representatives of the same to serve in Parliament, in which several services for his King and country he spent his strength and fortunes, and the wounds which that [sic] received were not healed in the year 1683.

In 1686 pressure was put on him to pay the £1095 fee for his baronetcy, but Laurence Hyde, 1st Lord of the Treasury quashed this. Matters were so dire just before his death that he had to sell Hardwick to Sir John Holland and his eldest son had to live off a £20 a year pension from the county rates until even that was withdrawn and he was thrown into the Fleet Prison.

He died in 1694 and was buried at Hardwick. He was succeeded in the baronetcy by his eldest son, Thomas.

Parliament of England
| Preceded by Sir John Hobart, Bt. Nevill Catlin | Member of Parliament for Norfolk; 1679–1685; With: Sir John Hobart, Bt. | Succeeded by Sir Thomas Hare, Bt. Sir Jacob Astley, Bt. |
Baronetage of England
| New creation | Baronet (of Hardwick); 1666–1696 | Succeeded by Thomas Gleane |
