= Horatio Walpole (died 1717) =

English Tory politician

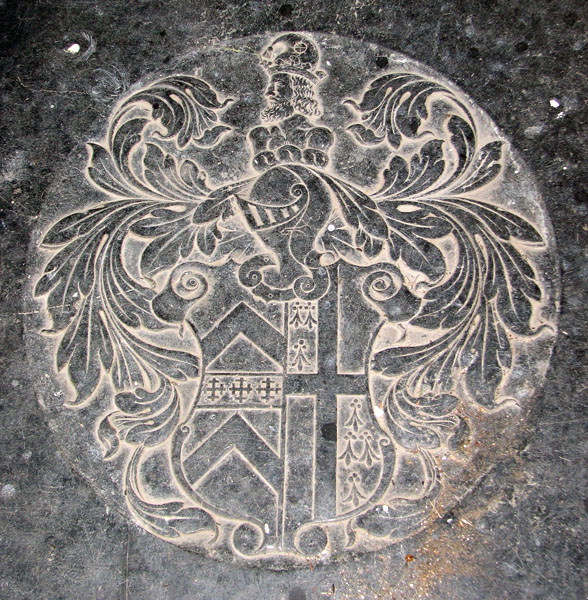
Detail from ledger stone of Horatio Walpole in St Martin at Tours' Church, Houghton, showing arms of Walpole impaling Osborne, for his second wife Anne Osborne

Horatio Walpole (11 July 1663 – 1717), of Beck Hall, Norfolk, was an English Tory politician who sat in the English and British House of Commons between 1702 and 1710. He was the uncle of Sir Robert Walpole, Prime Minister, but differed politically from the rest of the family.

== Early life ==
Walpole was the fourth, but second surviving son of Sir Edward Walpole of Houghton, Norfolk and his wife Susan Crane, daughter of Sir Robert Crane, 1st Baronet, of Chilton, Suffolk. He was the brother of Colonel Robert Walpole and hence the uncle of Sir Robert Walpole the Whig leader. He joined the army and was a cornet in an independent troop of horse and then in the 2nd Dragoon Guards in 1685. He was a captain from 1689 to 1691. He resigned from the army to marry Lady Anne Coke, widow of Robert Coke of Holkham, Norfolk, and daughter of Thomas Osborne, 1st Duke of Leeds on 26 March 1691. His stepson Edward Coke, the heir to Holkham, agreed to give Walpole a lease for life of Beckhall, supposedly for nothing after Walpole got him blind drunk.

== Career ==
Walpole's wife's family were strong Tories and he was anxious to fit in with them by obtaining a seat in Parliament. His brother Robert had a controlling interest at Castle Rising, but returned himself and Thomas Howard who held the other controlling interest in 1695 and 1698. Walpole was trustee for his brother Robert's son Robert, and when the elder Robert died, Walpole could withhold his consent when his nephew, who now held the controlling interest, was in need of money. Walpole was Freeman of Dunwich in 1701 and on the death of Howard in 1701 was offered an opportunity to stand which he declined. At the 1702 English general election, his nephew stood for King's Lynn and Walpole had the opportunity to stand for Castle Rising. There were local objections to putting up such a strong Tory as uncle Horatio, and local Dissenters had to be reassured that the new Member for Castle Rising would not be for persecuting them.

Once elected Member of Parliament, Walpole took very little interest in Parliament. He became a Freeman of King's Lynn in 1703. He was returned again for Castle Rising at the 1705 English general election in spite of the laments of many Norfolk Whigs about his ineffectiveness. He voted against the Court candidate for speaker, but continued to make little contribution. He was returned again at the 1708 British general election and voted against the impeachment of Henry Sacheverell in 1710. Walpole was becoming an increasing embarrassment to his nephew, who stood at Castle Rising instead of him at the 1710 British general election, but returned him at a by-election on 11 December 1710. Meanwhile, he was becoming short of money through his wife's extravagance and as a result of being charged rent on Beck Hall. He wrote importuning letters to Harley, claiming to be an effective Tory agent in Norfolk and seeking some preferment. In 1712, he was appointed a commissioner of revenue for Ireland. He voted for the French commerce bill on 18 June 1713 and presented an address to the Queen from Norfolk congratulating her on the peace in August 1713. He was finally dropped at the 1713 British general election but retained his post until 1716.

== Later life and legacy ==
In view of the increased rent for Beckhall, Walpole purchased an estate at Broomthorpe, close to Holkham, for £2,200 in 1715 with an annuity of £60 for life. He died there without issue on 17 November 1717. He left Broomthorpe to his nephew Galfridus Walpole, and other legacies to other members of the family of his brother Colonel Robert including £1,000 to Robert Walpole and £100 to Horatio Walpole, who succeeded him as Member for Castle Rising.

Parliament of England
Preceded by Marquess of Hartington; Robert Walpole	Member of Parliament for Castle Rising; 1702–1707; With: Sir Thomas Littleton 1702-1705; Sir Robert Clayton 1705; William Feilding 1705-1707	Succeeded by Parliament of Great Britain
Parliament of Great Britain
Preceded by Parliament of England	Member of Parliament for Castle Rising; 1707–1710; With: William Feilding	Succeeded by William Feilding; Robert Walpole
Preceded by William Feilding; Robert Walpole	Member of Parliament for Castle Rising; 1710–1713; With: William Feilding	Succeeded by William Feilding; Horatio Walpole, junior
