= Thomas Richardson, 2nd Lord Cramond =

English politician

Thomas Richardson, 2nd Lord Cramond (19 June 1627 – 16 May 1674) of Honingham Hall, Norfolk was an English politician who sat in the House of Commons from 1660 to 1674.

Richardson was the son of Sir Thomas Richardson and his wife Elizabeth Hewitt daughter of Sir William Hewitt, of Pishiobury, Hertfordshire. He was a grandson of Thomas Richardson who was a judge and speaker of the House of Commons. His grandfather's second wife Elizabeth Richardson, 1st Lady Cramond was given the title Lord Cramond which was to go to her stepson. Richardson succeeded to the peerage on the death of Lady Cramond in April 1651 as his father died on 12 March 1645.

In 1660, Richardson was elected Member of Parliament for Norfolk in the Convention Parliament. He was re-elected MP for Norfolk in 1661 for the Cavalier Parliament and sat until his death in 1674.

Richardson died at the age of 46.

Richardson married Anne Gurney, daughter of Sir Richard Gurney, 1st Baronet, of Totteridge, Hertfordshire. His son Henry succeeded to the title. The estate of Honingham had already been sold to Richard Baylie (in 1650).

Parliament of England
Vacant Not represented in the restored Rump Title last held by Sir Horatio Townshend; Sir William D'Oyly	Member of Parliament for Norfolk; 1660–1674; With: Sir Horatio Townshend; Sir Ralph Hare; Sir John Hobart	Succeeded by Sir John Hobart; Sir Robert Kemp
Peerage of Scotland
Preceded by Elizabeth Richardson	Lord Cramond; 1651–1674	Succeeded by Henry Richardson
