= Norfolk Trained Bands =

Auxiliary force of the British Army

- Active: 1572–1662
- Country: England
- Branch: Trained Bands
- Role: Infantry and Cavalry
- Size: 5 Regiments of Foot, 1 Regiment of Horse

Commanders
- Notable commanders: Sir William D'Oyly; Sir John Hobart, 3rd Baronet; Brampton Gurdon of Letton

The Norfolk Trained Bands were a part-time military force in the English county of Norfolk in East Anglia from 1558 until they were reconstituted as the Norfolk Militia in 1662. They were periodically embodied for home defence, for example during the Rising of the North in 1569 and the Armada Crisis of 1588. They campaigned in the Bishops' Wars but saw no active service then or during the English Civil War. However, the Norfolks TBs were an integral part of the government security apparatus during the period of the Commonwealth and Protectorate.

== Tudor origin ==
The English militia was descended from the Anglo-Saxon Fyrd, the military force raised from the freemen of the shires under command of their Sheriff. It continued under the Norman kings, and was reorganised under the Assizes of Arms of 1181 and 1252, and again by King Edward I's Statute of Winchester of 1285. In 1539 King Henry VIII held a Great Muster of all the counties, recording the number of armed men available in each hundred.

The legal basis of the militia was updated by two acts of 1557 covering musters (4 & 5 Ph. & M. c. 3) and the maintenance of horses and armour (4 & 5 Ph. & M. c. 2). The county militia was now under the Lord Lieutenant, assisted by the deputy lieutenants and justices of the peace (JPs). The entry into force of these acts in 1558 is seen as the starting date for the organised county militia in England. In 1569 Norfolk was one of the southern counties called on to supply men to suppress the Rising of the North. Although the militia obligation was universal, this assembly confirmed that it was impractical to train and equip every able-bodied man, so after 1572 the practice was to select a proportion of men for the trained bands, who were mustered for regular training.

=== Armada crisis ===
From 1583 the maritime counties such as Norfolk were given precedence for training: in return for a reduced quota of men they were supplied with professional captains to muster and train them. In 1584 the county was charged with supplying 1000 'shot' (men with firearms), 200 bowmen and 800 'corslets' (armoured pikemen), for a total of 2,000 trained men, but in practice mustered 723 shot, 1,031 bowmen and 342 corslets, for a total of 2,096. During the Armada Crisis of 1588 Norfolk furnished 2,200 trained and 2,100 untrained armed foot (out of 6340 able-bodied men), together with 80 lancers, 321 light horse and 377 'petronels' (the petronel was an early cavalry firearm).

In the 16th century little distinction was made between the militia and the troops levied by the counties for overseas expeditions. Between 1589 and 1601 Norfolk supplied 900 levies for service in Ireland, 450 for France and 600 for the Netherlands. However, the counties usually conscripted the unemployed and criminals rather than the Trained Bandsmen – in 1585 the Privy Council had ordered the impressment of able-bodied unemployed men, and the Queen ordered 'none of her trayned-bands to be pressed'. Replacing the weapons issued to the levies from the militia armouries was a heavy cost on the counties. The men were given 'conduct money' for the journey to the embarkation ports (18 days were allowed for the Norfolk levies to reach Chester for Ireland)

== Stuart Reforms ==
With the passing of the threat of invasion, the trained bands declined in the early 17th Century. Later, King Charles I attempted to reform them into a national force or 'Perfect Militia' answering to the king rather than local control. The Norfolk Trained Bands on the eve of the civil wars consisted of some 30 companies of 80–200 men, drawn from one or more of the county hundreds, within which individual parishes were each responsible for providing a 'file' of 4–5 men. The hundreds of Norfolk were normally grouped in four 'divisions', so the companies raised in each division naturally formed four regiments of foot. There were two Troops of horse in each division, which usually trained with the foot regiment. The City of Norwich had its own regiment of six companies. In 1638 these totalled 5137 foot (2910 muskets and 2407 corslets), and 400 horse (80 Cuirassiers and 320 Harquebusiers).

=== Bishops' Wars ===
In 1639 men were ordered to be selected from the Norfolk TBs to form Sir Nicholas Byron's Regiment of Foot for the First Bishops' War against Scotland. However, in practice many of the men sent were untrained substitutes, and there were not enough trained men to provide non-commissioned officers. Captain Thomas Parker of the Norfolk TBs and his family ran an organised racket demanding bribes to release men illegally. It was also noted that Byron's officers were inexpert, and some were missing. In April the regiment was shipped from Norfolk to the Firth of Forth and landed on the island of Inchkeith. However, the Covenanters onshore were too strong for the King's commander, the Marquis of Hamilton to attempt a landing. In May the regiments were re-embarked and sailed back to anchor off Dunbar, later continuing to Holy Island, where they arrived on 28 May. They marched to Berwick-upon-Tweed, but Byron's regiment does not appear to have been present at the final stand-off between the armies between Birks and Duns Law on the border. After that the army was dispersed to its homes.

In March 1640 Norfolk was ordered to ship another contingent of 750 trained bandsmen to Newcastle upon Tyne for the Second Bishops' War. Once again many of those sent on this unpopular service would have been untrained replacements and conscripts. Once assembled, the Norfolk contingent, like several others, was disorderly, arrears of pay and lack of provisions being among their main concerns, as well as suspicion of the government and church. The second campaign was also unsuccessful.

Map of the hundreds of Norfolk.

=== English Civil Wars ===
Control of the TBs was one of the major points of dispute between Charles I and Parliament that led to the First English Civil War. When open warfare broke out between the King and Parliament, neither side made much use of the TBs beyond securing the county armouries for their own full-time troops who would serve anywhere in the country, many of whom were former trained bandsmen, or as auxiliary units for garrisons.

During the First English Civil War Norfolk was part of the Eastern Association and firmly under Parliamentarian control. In May 1643 Parliament instructed the TBs of the Norfolk hundreds of Marshland, Freebridge, Clacklose and South Greenoe, and of the town of Lynn to cooperate in securing that town. Valentine Walton, Member of Parliament (MP) MP for Huntingdonshire and colonel of one of the Eastern Association's regiments of foot, was appointed Governor of Lynn in 1643 and retained the position until about 1653, after which its security was left in the hands of the mayor and his officials.

When the First Civil War ended in 1646 the regiments of the Norfolk County TBs were commanded by:

- Sir Jacob Astley
- Sir William D'Oyly
- Sir Christopher Calthorpe
- Thomas Knyvett
- William Paston, 7 troops of horse

In 1648 Alderman Adrian Parmeter was colonel of the Norwich City regiment, and he was entrusted with a thorough review of the city's militia organisation. In July the regiment was reliable enough for a company to be sent to Yarmouth to guard against the Royalist ships offshore, and each company in rotation served there for eight days at a time until the danger had passed. Lynn and Yarmouth had two or three companies each at different times, while Norwich and Yarmouth each had a troop of horse until the end of 1648.

As Parliament tightened its grip on the country after the Second English Civil War it passed new Militia Acts in 1648 and 1650 that replaced lords lieutenant with county commissioners appointed by Parliament or the Council of State. Under the Commonwealth and Protectorate the militia received pay when called out, and operated alongside the New Model Army to control the country. Following Pride's Purge, considerable changes were made to the officers of the militia to ensure loyalty. In 1650 the Council of State commissioned the following for Norfolk:

- Col Sir John Hobart, with 7 companies
- Col Robert Wilton, with 7 companies
- Col Robert Woodsend, with 6 companies
- – with 7 companies
- Horse and Dragoons: Col Robert Jermy with 7 troops
- Norwich: Col Charles George Cooke, with 6 companies of foot
- Norwich: Maj Brown with a company of dragoons
- Yarmouth: Maj William Burton with 3 companies of foot
- Lynn: Capt Durdan with a troop of horse

Only one captain was retained from 1646 (Robert Doughty of Aylsham, now major of Hobart's Regiment). Even so, the officers appointed were not all wholehearted supporters of the regime, and disaffection was reported among the officers of one regiment in May 1650.

The Norfolk TBs were called on to secure the county during the Norfolk insurrection of November 1650, but although some of the horse helped in its suppression, the main gathering on Easton Heath was dispersed by units of the standing army. However, in December the Norfolk TBs were put at the disposal of the governors of Yarmouth and Lynn, which would be key ports for an enemy landing in support of the insurrection. In 1651 the Scots invaded England in the Third English Civil War. On 6 August 1651 Walton was commissioned to command a militia regiment drawn from the hundreds of Freebridge Lynn, Freebridge Marshland, and about Lynn, and at the end of the month the whole of the Norfolk TBs were mobilised. Norfolk and Suffolk were ordered to keep at least a regiment of foot in Lothingland (the area around Yarmouth), to be arranged between Walton and Col Robert Jermy of the Norfolk TB Horse, while Hobart's and Wood's regiments (with two troops of horse and possibly one of dragoons) marched out of the county to the militia rendezvous at Oxford. However, they were too late to take part in the Battle of Worcester.

=== Protectorate ===
The establishment of The Protectorate saw Oliver Cromwell take control of the militia, with a volunteer 'Select Militia' as a paid force to support his Rule by Major-Generals. From now on the term 'Trained Band' began to be replaced by 'General Militia'. Colonel Jermy, his major, Ralph Woolmer, and Brampton Gurdon, formerly colonel of a regiment of Suffolk TB horse, each commanded a troop of Select Militia Horse in 1651. A Volunteer Association for Norfolk and Norwich paid for a County Select Militia foot regiment in 1651 under Col George Cock of the City of Norwich Regiment and there were also two Select Militia foot companies in Norwich in 1655.

Meanwhile, the General Militia in Norfolk had fallen into abeyance. While there was a brief muster of the General Militia in some counties during the Penruddock uprising of 1655, there is no evidence that the Norfolk County TBs were mustered. and the Council only proposed to mobilise one regiment (under Wood) during the invasion scare of 1656.

After the resignation of Richard Cromwell from the Protectorate in 1659 the regime fell into crisis. Booth's Uprising in August seemed to pose a significant threat, and the county militias were reconstituted. Norfolk was reduced from four to three foot regiments, and only one of the foot colonels (Wood) was retained. The other two appointed were Robert Jermy, previously colonel of the county horse militia, and Edward Bulwer who had not previously held a command. Robert Doughty was appointed as Bulwer's lieutenant-colonel, with another officer of 1650 as major. Thomas Toll, alderman of Lynn and previously captain in the Lynn TB, was appointed Jermy's lt-col. Apart from two captains in Wood's regiment, none of the other officers had previously held commands in the Norfolk Militia. The horse were commanded by Brampton Gurdon.

== Restoration Milita ==
After the Restoration of the Monarchy, the English Militia was re-established by the Militia Act of 1661 under the control of the king's lords-lieutenant, the men to be selected by ballot. This was popularly seen as the 'Constitutional Force' to counterbalance a 'Standing Army' tainted by association with the New Model Army that had supported Cromwell's military dictatorship, and almost the whole burden of home defence and internal security was entrusted to the militia under politically reliable local landowners. None of the officers named in 1659 was reappointed to the Norfolk Militia in 1660. Many of the officers now appointed had held commissions in the 1646 list or came from families who traditionally provided the company officers in their hundreds From then until about 1715 the Norfolk Militia was regularly mustered or turned out to counter invasion threats.

== Re-enactors ==
- Norfolke Trayned Bands of the English Civil War Society
