= Edward Walpole (King's Lynn MP) =

English politician and knight

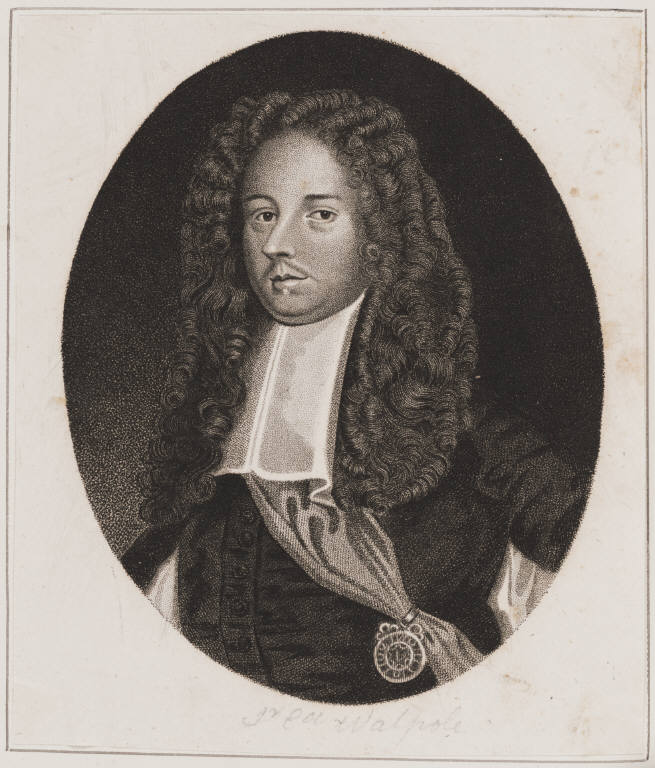

Member of the House of Commons

Personal details
- Born: 1621
- Died: 18 March 1668 (aged 46–47)
- Resting place: Houghton, Norfolk
- Spouse: Susan Crane (m. 1649; died 1667)
- Relations: Robert Walpole (grandson)
- Children: 14, including Robert Walpole and Horatio Walpole

Sir Edward Walpole KB (1621 – 18 March 1668) was an English politician and knight who sat in the House of Commons from 1660 to 1668.

Walpole was the son of Robert Walpole of Houghton and his wife Susan Barkham, daughter of Sir Edward Barkham of South Acre who had been Lord Mayor of London. He was baptised on 9 November 1621. He was a student of Middle Temple in 1640. In 1657 he was commissioner for assessment for Norfolk and was commissioner for sewers in 1658 and 1659. He was commissioner for militia in March 1660 and lieutenant colonel of foot militia from April 1660 to his death.

In 1660, Walpole was elected Member of Parliament for King's Lynn in the Convention Parliament. He was a JP from June 1660 and Deputy Lieutenant and commissioner for assessment for Norfolk from August 1660 until his death. He was commissioner for sewers again in September 1660. In 1661 he was re-elected MP for King's Lynn in the Cavalier Parliament. He was created Knight of the Bath on 19 April 1661. From 1662 to 1663 he was commissioner for corporations. He succeeded his father in 1663. In 1668 he was commissioner for trade with Scotland.

Walpole married Susan Crane, daughter of Sir Robert Crane, 1st Baronet of Chilton, Suffolk in around 1649. They had five sons and eight daughters. She died on 7 July 1667. Walpole died the following year on 18 March 1668 at the age of about 46 and was buried at Houghton, Norfolk.

One of his sons was Robert Walpole, whose son was Robert Walpole, Britain's longest-serving prime minister. Another son was Horatio Walpole.

Parliament of England
Preceded by William Cecil (The Earl of Salisbury)	Member of Parliament for King's Lynn; 1660–1668; With: Sir Ralph Hare 1660; Sir William Hovell 1661–1668	Succeeded by Sir William Hovell; Robert Wright
