= Peter Gleane (MP for Norwich) =

English politician

Sir Peter Gleane (1564–1633) was an English politician who sat in the House of Commons from 1628 to 1629.

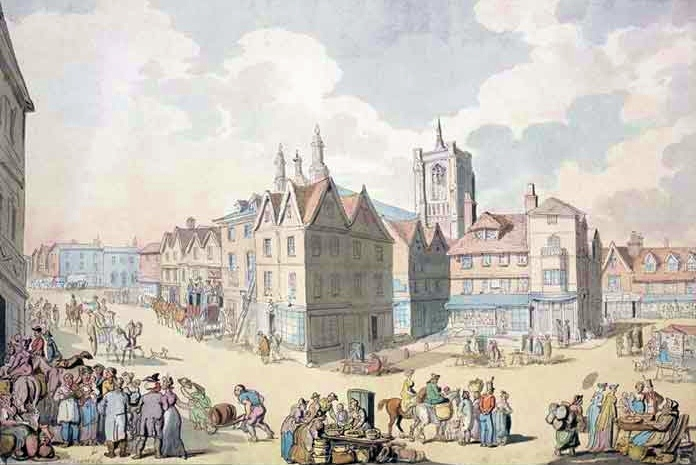
Gleane was associated with St Peter Mancroft at Norwich Market

Gleane was the son of Thomas Gleane of Norwich and was baptised at St Peter Mancroft, Norwich, on 27 June 1564. He was awarded BA from Clare College, Cambridge in 1583. In 1610, he was Sheriff of Norwich and, in 1615, the Mayor of Norwich. He was knighted on 13 June 1624.

In 1628, he was elected Member of Parliament for Norwich and sat until 1629 when King Charles decided to rule without parliament for eleven years.

Gleane died at the age of about 69 and was buried at St Peter Mancroft on 10 May 1633.

Gleane married Maud Suckling, daughter of Robert Suckling of Norwich. His grandson Peter was created a baronet.

== See also ==
- Gleane (surname)

Parliament of England
| Preceded by Sir John Suckling; Sir Thomas Hyrne | Member of Parliament for Norwich; 1628–1629; With: Robert Debney | Parliament suspended until 1640 |
