= John Money (aeronaut) =

British Army general

General John Money
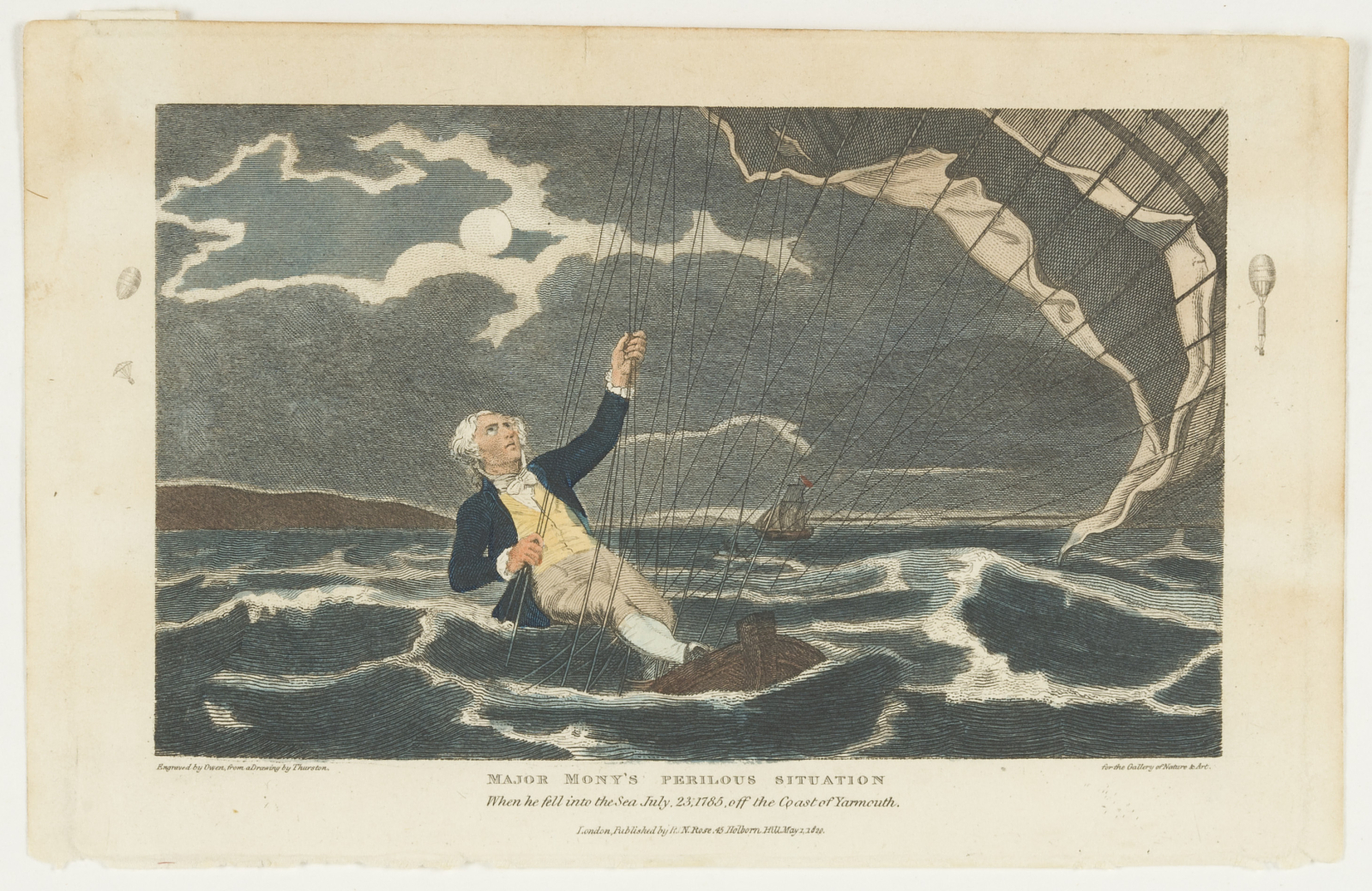
- "Major Mony's Perilous Situation When he fell into the Sea July 23, 1785, off the Coast of Yarmouth"
- Born: 1752
- Died: 26 March 1817 (aged 64–65) Trowse, Norfolk, England

John Money (1752 – 26 March 1817) was an aeronaut and general in the British Army.

== Life ==
Money began his military career in the Norfolk Militia, but on entering the regular army in 1762 became cornet in the 6th (Inniskilling) Dragoons. He was promoted to captain in the 9th (East Norfolk) Regiment of Foot in 1770 and to major in 1781. He went on half-pay in 1784, and never rejoined the active list, but was made lieutenant colonel by brevet in 1790. In a similar fashion, he was promoted to colonel in 1795, major general in 1798, lieutenant general in 1805, and full general in 1814. Money saw a good deal of active service. He was present at the battle of Fellinghausen in 1761 and in various skirmishes with Elliot's light dragoons. He served in Canada in 1777 in General Burgoyne's disastrous descent on Albany from the north, and was present at several engagements. He was taken prisoner in September, and does not appear to have been released till the end of the war.

Money was one of the earliest English aeronauts, making two ascents in 1785, that is, within two years of Montgolfier's first aerial voyage. On 22 July in that year he made an ascent from Norwich; an "improper current" took him out to sea, and then, dipping into the water, he "remained for seven hours struggling with his fate," till rescued in a small boat. In A Treatise on the Use of Balloons and Field Observators (1803) he advocated the use of balloons for military purposes.

Money offered his services to the rebel party in the Austrian Netherlands in 1790, when, after experiencing some successes, their prospects were growing critical. After a first refusal his offer was accepted. He was given a commission as major-general, and was placed in command of a force of about four or five thousand men at Tirlemont. His troops were half-hearted, and in the end, after one sharp engagement, he had to join in the general retreat on Brussels, a retreat which ended the rebellion. He utilised his knowledge of the country in his eight-volume 1794 publication, History of the Campaign of 1792. He died at Trowse Hall, Norfolk, 26 March 1817.
