= Christopher Calthorpe =

English Member of Parliament

Sir Christopher Calthorpe
- Born: c. 1645
- Died: 7 February 1718
- Spouse: Dorothy Spring
- Parent(s): James Calthorpe, Catherine Lewkenor

Sir Christopher Calthorpe KB (c. 1645 – 7 February 1718) was an English member of parliament.

== Early life and education ==
Calthorpe was born into a rich Norfolk family which had held manorial property in East Anglia since 1376 and had first represented the county in Parliament under Henry VI. His father was a Parliamentary sympathiser in the Civil War and had held local office under the Commonwealth. His mother, Catherine, was the daughter of Sir Edward Lewkenor of Denham. Calthorpe was educated at Christ's College, Cambridge, followed by Middle Temple in 1660. He was invested as a Knight of the Order of the Bath on 23 April 1661.

== Political career ==
Calthorpe joined the Norfolk Tory political faction headed by Robert Paston, 1st Earl of Yarmouth, which secured his election to the House of Commons in February 1679, representing Norfolk. However, the legitimacy of his election was challenged by his political rivals, and a by-election was held in May the same year. It was won by the Whig candidate, Sir John Hobart, 3rd Baronet. In 1688, Calthorpe bluntly declared that he could not give his assent to the repeal of the Test Act and Penal Laws, and he was removed from local office as a justice of the peace. A non-juror after the Glorious Revolution, he was disarmed in September 1689 at the behest of his rival, Sir Henry Hobart, and in the following summer he was placed in confinement as a person 'suspected to be dangerous to the peace of the kingdom'. Hobart again had him arrested after the Jacobite assassination plot 1696. He died in 1718.

== Personal life ==
He married Dorothy, the youngest daughter of Sir William Spring, 1st Baronet, in 1664, with whom he had five sons and nine daughters.

Parliament of England
Preceded by Sir Robert Kemp, Bt; Sir John Hobart, Bt	Member of Parliament for Norfolk; February 1679 – May 1679; With: Sir Nevill Catlin	Succeeded by Sir Nevill Catlin; Sir John Hobart, Bt
