= William Feilding (1669–1723) =

English politician (1669–1723)

Hon. William Feilding (1669–1723), of Ashtead, Surrey and Duke Street, Westminster, was an English Whig politician who sat in the English House of Commons from 1705 to 1707 and in the British House of Commons from 1707 to 1723.

Feilding was the second son of William Feilding, 3rd Earl of Denbigh and his wife Mary King, daughter of Sir Robert King of Boyle Abbey, county Roscommon. He matriculated at Queen's College, Oxford on 4 May 1686, aged 16. He was Lieutenant of the Yeomen of the Guard from 1704 to 1708. In December 1705, he made an advantageous marriage to Lady Diana Howard, widow of Thomas Howard, MP of Ashtead, Surrey, and daughter of Francis Newport, 1st Earl of Bradford. She was wealthy and had a parliamentary seat at her disposal.

Feilding was returned unopposed as Member (MP) for Castle Rising at a by-election on 29 November 1705. He was returned in 1708, 1710, 1713, 1715 and 1722. He was appointed clerk comptroller of the Green Cloth for life in 1716.

Feilding died at Epsom on 21 September 1723 and was buried at Ashtead. He and his wife had no children.

Parliament of Great Britain
| Preceded by Sir Robert Clayton; Horatio Walpole, senior | Member of Parliament for Castle Rising; 1705–1723; With: Horatio Walpole, senior 1704-1710; Robert Walpole 1710-1713; Horatio Walpole, senior 1713; Horatio Walpole, junior 1713=1715; Lieutenant-General Charles Churchill 1715-1723 | Succeeded by The Earl of Mountrath; Lieutenant-General Charles Churchill |
