= Thomas Blofield =

English politician (1635–1708)

Thomas Blofield (c. 1635 – 17 October 1708) was an English politician. He sat at various times as MP for Norwich in 1689, 1690, 1695, 1698, February 1701, and 1702.

He was the first son of Robert Blofield (died 1670) and his first wife Mary, the daughter of Thomas Layer. By 1664, he married Elizabeth, the daughter of Henry Negus. They had no children.
