= Horatio Townshend, 1st Viscount Townshend =

English politician

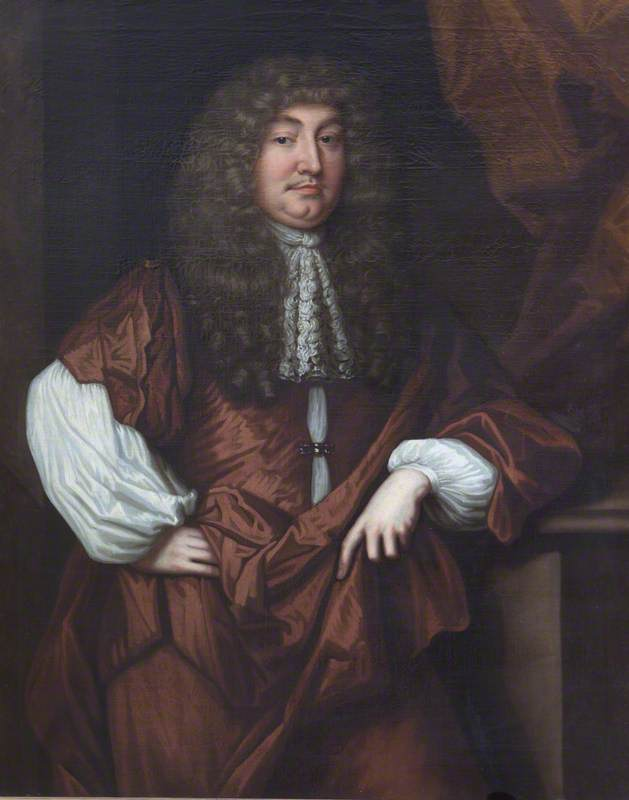
Horatio Townshend, 1st Viscount Townshend

Arms of Townshend: Azure, a chevron ermine between three escallops argent

Horatio Townshend, 1st Baron Townsend and 1st Viscount Townshend (/ˈtaʊnzənd/; 14 December 1630 – 10 December 1687), known as Sir Horatio Townshend, 3rd baronet, of Raynham, from 1648 to 1661, was an English politician who sat in the House of Commons between 1656 and 1660 and was raised to the peerage in 1661.

== Early life ==
Townshend was the younger son of Sir Roger Townshend, 1st Baronet, of Raynham, and his wife Mary Vere, daughter of Horace Vere, 1st Baron Vere of Tilbury. He was a student at St John's College, Cambridge, in 1644 and travelled abroad in Italy and Switzerland from 1646 to 1648. In 1648 he succeeded his elder brother in the baronetcy.

== Political career ==
He was elected member of parliament for Norfolk in 1656 for the Second Protectorate Parliament and in 1659 for the Third Protectorate Parliament.

Townshend was elected MP for Norfolk again in 1660 for the Convention Parliament. He was a supporter of King Charles II and played an important role in the restoration of the monarchy in 1660. In 1661 he was raised to the peerage as Baron Townshend, of Lynn Regis in the County of Norfolk, and was Lord Lieutenant of Norfolk between 1660 and 1676. In 1682 he was further honoured when he was made Viscount Townshend, of Raynham in the County of Norfolk.

== Marriage and family ==
Townshend married Mary Ashe, daughter of a fellow Member of Parliament, Sir Joseph Ashe. Lord Townshend died in December 1687, aged 56, and was succeeded in his titles by his son Charles, who became a prominent statesman. Other descendants of Townshend include Horatio Townshend, George Townshend, 1st Marquess Townshend, Charles Townshend and Thomas Townshend, 1st Viscount Sydney.

== Ancestry ==
Ancestors of Horatio Townshend, 1st Viscount Townshend

8. Sir Roger Townshend
4. Sir John Townshend
9. Jane Stanhope
2. Sir Roger Townshend, 1st Baronet
10. Sir Nathaniel Bacon
5. Anne Bacon
11. Anne Gresham
1. Horatio Townshend, 1st Viscount Townshend
12. Geoffrey Vere
6. Horace Vere, 1st Baron Vere of Tilbury
13. Elizabeth Hardekyn
3. Mary Vere
14. Sir John Tracy
7. Mary Tracy
15. Anne Throckmorton

== Notes ==
Parliament of England
Preceded by Sir John Hobart; Sir William D'Oyly; Sir Ralph Hare, Bt; Thomas Weld; Robert Wilton; Thomas Sotherton; Philip Wodehouse; Robert Wood (senior); Philip Bedingfield (senior); Tobias Frere	Member of Parliament for Norfolk; 1656 – May 1659; With: Sir John Hobart; Charles Fleetwood; Sir William D'Oyly; Sir Ralph Hare, Bt; Colonel Robert Wilton; Philip Wodehouse; Colonel Robert Wood; John Buxton; Thomas Sotherton	Vacant Not represented in the restored Rump
Vacant Not represented in the restored Rump Title last held by Self; Sir William D'Oyly	Member of Parliament for Norfolk; 1660–1661; With: The Lord Cramond	Succeeded by The Lord Cramond; Sir Ralph Hare, Bt
Honorary titles
Preceded by The Earl of Southampton	Lord Lieutenant of Norfolk; 1661–1676	Succeeded by The Viscount Yarmouth
Vacant Title last held by Edwin Rich (parliamentary)	Vice-Admiral of Norfolk; 1663–1676	Succeeded by The Viscount Yarmouth
Peerage of England
New creation	Viscount Townshend; 1682–1687	Succeeded by Charles Townshend
New creation	Baron Townshend; 1661–1667	Succeeded by Charles Townshend
Baronetage of England
Preceded by Roger Townshend	Baronet (of Raynham); 1648–1687	Succeeded by Charles Townshend
