= Sir William D'Oyly, 1st Baronet =

English politician

Sir William D'Oyly, 1st Baronet (c. 1614 – November 1677) was an English politician who sat in the House of Commons variously between 1654 and 1677.

== Biography ==
D'Oyly was the son of William D'Oyly. He succeeded to the estates of his uncle Henry, and was known as Sir William, the elder. As heir to Susan D'Oyly, his cousin, he came into possession of Pond-hall (Hadleigh), Topsfield, and Cossford, in Suffolk, and Shottisham (now more generally spelled Shotesham), Gostlings, and three manors in Warham, in Norfolk. He was serving abroad in the army of Gustavus Adolphus of Sweden, and remained abroad after Gustavus Adolphus's death until he returned to take possession of the family fortune. He was knighted by King Charles I in 1642, for his gallant behaviour.

At the end of the First English Civil War in 1646 D'Oyly was commanding a regiment of the Norfolk Trained Bands, though he was excluded at the time of Pride's Purge. In 1654, he was elected Member of Parliament for Norfolk in the First Protectorate Parliament. He was re-elected MP for Norfolk in 1656 for the Second Protectorate Parliament and in 1659 for the Third Protectorate Parliament.

In 1660, D'Oyly was elected Member of Parliament for Great Yarmouth in the Convention Parliament, and also returned to a command in the county militia. He was among the most zealous in the convention parliament, for the restoration of the royal family. He was a very accomplished gentleman, and much esteemed in his county. He was one of the commissioners appointed by the House of Commons, to see the army disbanded, in 1661, and was chosen by the city of Norwich, with Sir Horatio Townsend, Sir John Holland, and Sir Ralph Hare, to wait on the King, soon after his return with the resignation of the charter which the king restored. He was re-elected MP for Great Yarmouth in 1661 for the Cavalier Parliament and sat until his death in 1677. In 1663, he was created a baronet, of Shottisham.

D'Oyly married Margaret Randall of Pulham, Norfolk. They had six daughters and three sons. He was succeeded in the baronetcy by his son William.

Coat of arms of Sir William D'Oyly, 1st Baronet
Crest Out of a ducal coronet Or two wings erect Sable bezantée between which and resting on the strawberry leaf of the coronet an estoile of six points Argent. Escutcheon Gules three bucks' heads cabossed Argent. Motto Do Noe Ylle Quoth D'Oylle (Do No Ill, Quoth Doyle)

Parliament of England
Preceded by Robert Jermy (?); Tobias Frere; Ralph Wolmer; Henry King; William Burton	Member of Parliament for Norfolk; 1654–1659; With: Sir John Hobart, 3rd Baronet 1654–1656; Sir Ralph Hare, 1st Baronet 1654–1656; Robert Wilton 1654–1656; Philip Wodehouse 1654–1656; Thomas Sotherton 1654–1657; Robert Wood (senior) 1654–1656; Philip Bedingfield 1654; Tobias Frere 1654; Thomas Weld 1654; William Buxton 1656; Charles Fleetwood 1656; Sir Horatio Townsend 1656 –1659	Succeeded by Not represented in restored Rump
Baronetage of England
New creation	Baronet (of Shottisham); 1663–1677	Succeeded by William D'Oyly
