= Gleane baronets =

Extinct baronetcy in the Baronetage of England

The Gleane Baronetcy, of Hardwick in the County of Norfolk, was a title in the Baronetage of England. It was created on 6 March 1666 for Peter Gleane, Member of Parliament for Norfolk. The title became extinct on the death of the fourth Baronet in 1745.

== Gleane baronets, of Hardwick (1666) ==
- Sir Peter Gleane, 1st Baronet (1619–1695)
- Sir Thomas Gleane, 2nd Baronet (c. 1650 – c. 1700)
- Sir Peter Gleane, 3rd Baronet (c. 1672 – c. 1735)
- Sir Peter Gleane, 4th Baronet (c. 1696–1745)
