= John Buxton (politician) =

English lawyer and politician

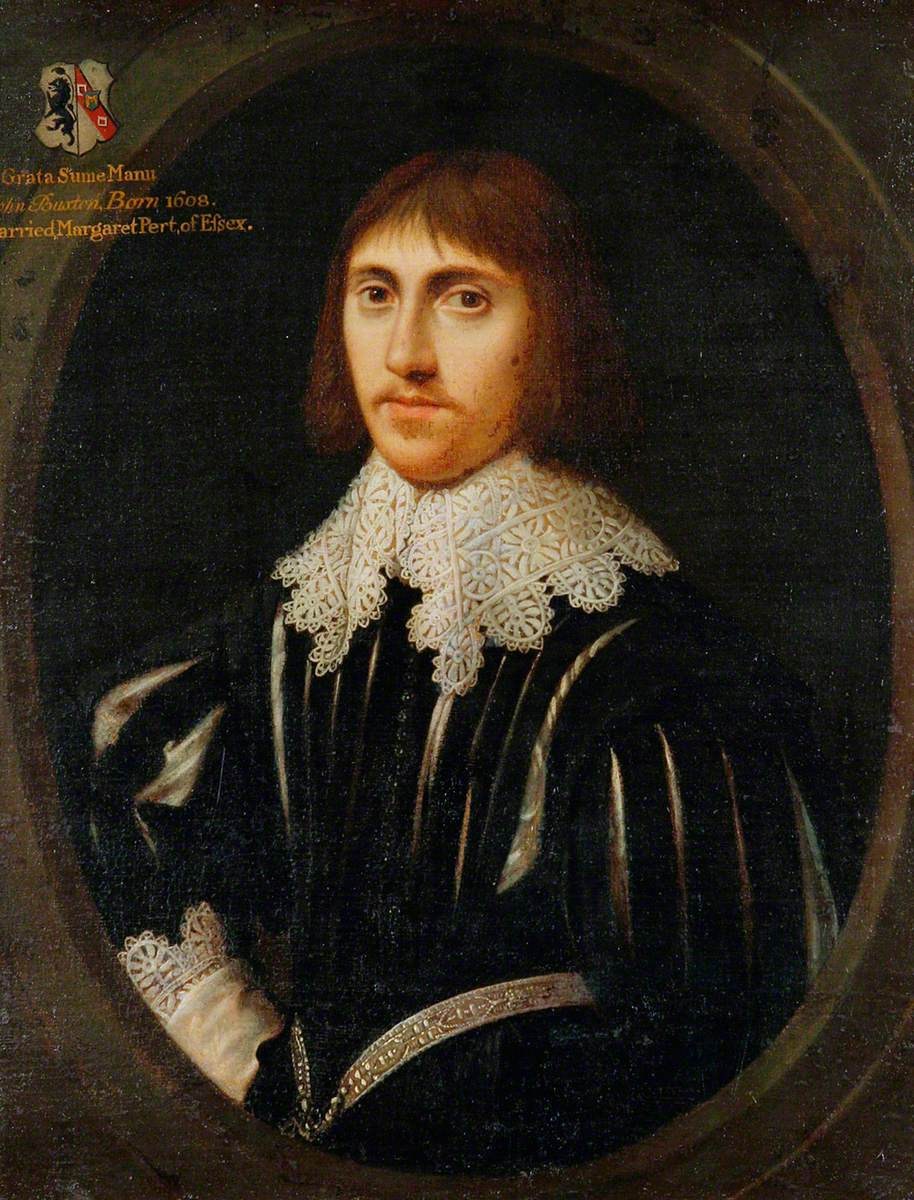
Image of John Buxton

John Buxton (1608–1660) was an English lawyer and politician from Tibenham in Norfolk. In 1656, in the Second Protectorate Parliament he was the Member of Parliament for Norfolk, one of three replacements of the knights of the shire for the county of Norfolk, replacing those who had been elected in the 1654 parliament (First Protectorate Parliament); the other two were Charles Fleetwood and Sir Horatio Townshend.

He was admitted to Gray's Inn in 1626, and took over as High Sheriff of Norfolk in 1638 after the death of Sir Francis Astley.
