= Thomas Sotherton =

16th-century English politician

Thomas Sotherton (by 1525 – 1583), of Norwich, Norfolk, was an English politician.

He was a Member of Parliament (MP) for Norwich in 1558 and 1559 and mayor of the city in 1565-66.

He was the eldest son of Nicholas Sotherton (d.1540) of Norwich by Agnes Wright. He married Elizabeth, daughter of Augustine Steward of Norwich. They had four sons and four daughters.

== Children ==
Children of Thomas Sotherton and Elizabeth Steward:

- Augustine Sotherton of Hesleden (Hellesdon) near Norwich, m. Anne, daughter of Thomas Peck of Norwich, and had:
  1. Samwell Sotheron of Hesleden, m. Mary, daughter of Thomas Gilbert of Burlingham in Norfolk, and had Thomas, who ob. s.p, Gilbert and Anne
  2. Thomas
  3. Elias
  4. Elizabeth, the wife of Thomas Warner of Hofton (Hoveton) in Norfolk
- Nicholas
- Thomas
- Susan
- Matthew
- Judith, the wife of Thomas Ferreby of Norfolk
- Elizabeth, ob.
- Mary, the wife of Henry Barker of Norwich
