= Walpole family =

British aristocratic family

Walpole
- Walpole coat of arms: Or, on a fesse between two chevrons sable three crosses crosslet of the field
- Current region: Norfolk, England
- Titles: Earl of Orford; Baron Walpole
- Members: Robert Walpole; Horace Walpole
- Estates: Houghton Hall; Mannington Hall; Wolterton Hall

The Walpole family (/ˈwɔːlˌpoʊl, ˈwɒl-/) is a famous English aristocratic family known for their 18th century political influence and for building notable country houses including Houghton Hall. Heads of this family have traditionally been the Earl of Orford. Robert Walpole, 10th Baron Walpole, resided at Mannington Hall. Wolterton Hall has been undergoing restoration since 2016.

Partial family tree

Thomas Walpole (died 1514)
Edward Walpole (died 1559)	Henry Walpole
John Walpole (died 1588)	John Walpole (died 1557)	Christopher Walpole
Edward Walpole (1560–1637)	Calybut Walpole (1561–1646)	Henry Walpole (1558–1595)
Robert Walpole (1593–1663)
Sir Edward Walpole (1621–1668)
Robert Walpole (1650–1700)	Horatio Walpole (1663–1717)
Catherine Shorter (died 1737)	Robert Walpole, 1st Earl of Orford (1676–1745)	Maria Skerrett (died 1738)	Horatio Walpole, 1st Baron Walpole (1678–1757)	Galfridus Walpole (1683–1726)	Dorothy Walpole (1686–1726)
Robert Walpole, 2nd Earl of Orford (1709–1751)	Sir Edward Walpole (1706–1784)	Horatio Walpole, 4th Earl of Orford (1717–1797)	Horatio Walpole, 1st Earl of Orford (1723–1809)	Thomas Walpole (1727–1803)	Richard Walpole (1728–1798)	Robert Walpole (1736–1810)
George Walpole, 3rd Earl of Orford (1730–1791)	Maria Walpole (1736–1807)	Horatio Walpole, 2nd Earl of Orford (1752–1822)	George Walpole (1758–1835)	Thomas Walpole (1755–1840)	Robert Walpole (1781–1856)
Horatio Walpole, 3rd Earl of Orford (1783–1858)	John Walpole (1787–1859)	Thomas Walpole (1805–1881)	Spencer Horatio Walpole (1808–1898)	Sir Robert Walpole (1808–1876)	Robert Seymour Walpole (1820–1910)
Horatio Walpole, 4th Earl of Orford (1813–1894)	Frederick Walpole (1822–1876)	Lady Dorothy Walpole (1826–1913)	Henry Spencer Vade-Walpole (1837–1913)	Sir Spencer Walpole (1839–1907)	Somerset Walpole (1854–1929)
Robert Walpole, 5th Earl of Orford (1854–1931)	Horatio Spencer Walpole (1881–1918)	Sir Hugh Walpole (1884–1941)
Robert Henry Montgomerie Walpole, 9th Baron Walpole (1913–1989)
Robert Walpole, 10th Baron Walpole (1938–2021)	Judith Schofield (1939–1993)
Alice Walpole (born 1963)	Jonathan Walpole, 11th Baron Walpole (born 1967)

== Bibliography ==
- Jessopp, Augustus (1878). One Generation of a Norfolk House. A Contribution to Elizabethan History. Norwich: Miller & Leavins. p. 374.
- Johnstone-Roberts, Anthony (2013). Sir William Walpole and The Walpole Estate. Research and Papers.
