= Lady Dorothy Mills =

British explorer and writer (1889–1959)

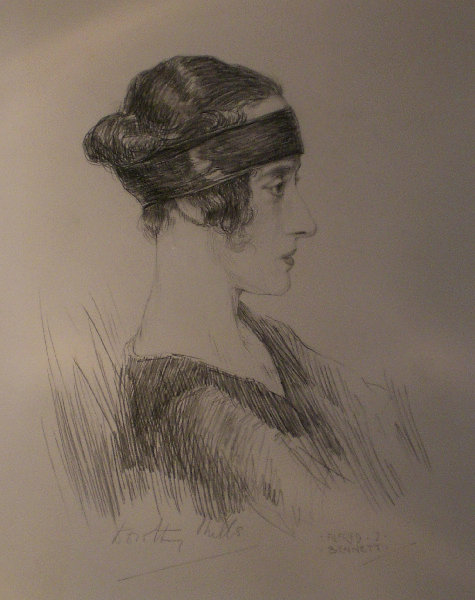
- Mills c. 1921
- Born: Dorothy Rachel Melissa Walpole; 11 March 1889; 4 Queen's Gate Terrace, Kensington, London, UKGBI
- Died: 4 December 1959 (aged 70); Brighton, Sussex, UK
- Occupations: Explorer; travel writer; memoirist
- Spouse: Arthur F. H. Mills (m. 1916; div. 1933)
- Father: Robert Walpole, 5th Earl of Orford
- Relatives: Lady Anne Berry (half-sister)
- Family: Walpole family
- Writing career
- Language: English

Lady Dorothy Rachel Melissa Mills (née Walpole; 11 March 1889 – 4 December 1959) was a British explorer, travel writer and memoirist, known as Dolly Mills.

== Early life and family ==
Mills was born on 11 March 1889 at 4 Queen's Gate Terrace, Kensington to Robert Walpole, a diplomat and former naval lieutenant, and Louise Melissa Walpole (née Corbin; 1866–1909). Mills' father was the son of Frederick Walpole, a politician and member of the Walpole family, and her mother was the daughter of the American mining and railway magnate Daniel Chase Corbin. The elder half-sister of the horticulturist Lady Anne Berry (née Walpole), Mills' brother Horatio Corbin Walpole (1891–1893), and half-sister Lady Gladys Walpole (1918–1919) died in infancy.

In 1894, following the death of her great-uncle Horatio Walpole, 4th Earl of Orford, Mills' father became the 5th Earl of Orford. Like her mother Mills was educated in Paris.

== Career ==
Her travel adventures took her to places such as Liberia, the Bosphorous, Arabia, and Venezuela. She is believed to be the first "white woman" to visit Timbuktu, as described in her travelogue The Road to Timbuktu (1924).

After being severely injured in a car accident in 1929, she recovered and resolved to become the first to discover the source of the Orinoco River in 1931, leading to her book, The Country of the Orinoco (1931). While planning a trip to Egypt and the Middle East, her father, Lord Walpole, died in Manurewa, Auckland, New Zealand, on 27 September 1931. She was a Soroptimist and a founder member of SI Greater London, which was chartered in 1923.

== Personal life ==
In 1916, Mills married Captain Arthur F. H. Mills of the Duke of Cornwall's Light Infantry after he was wounded in the First World War, being presented at the ceremony with a wedding ring made from a bullet that had been surgically removed from his ankle after he was wounded in combat at La Bassée, France. Mills was also an author of both fiction and non-fiction titles. Mills' father disapproved of the match and disinherited her. Following death her maternal grandfather in 1918, Mills' was left a trust fund which could only be accessed following the death of her father.

Lady Dorothy Mills filed a divorce decree in 1932, on the grounds of her husband's infidelity. The divorce was granted the following year after which Mills "retreated to a quiet and private life" at the seaside Steyning Mansions Hotel at Eastern Terrace in Brighton, publishing no more books before her death in 1959.

== Bibliography ==
Title	Publisher	Date	Genre
Card Houses	Eveleigh Nash Co.: London	1916	Novel
The Laughter of Fools	Duckworth & Co.: London	1920	Novel
The Tent of Blue	Duckworth & Co.: London	1922	Novel
The Road	Duckworth & Co.: London	1923	Novel
The Arms of the Sun	Duckworth & Co.: London	1924	Novel
The Road to Timbuktu	Duckworth & Co.: London	1924	Travel
The Dark Gods	Duckworth & Co.: London	1925	Novel
Beyond the Bosphorous	Duckworth & Co.: London	1926	Travel
Phœnix	Hutchinson & Co.: London	1926	Novel
Through Liberia	Duckworth & Co.: London	1926	Travel
Master!	Hutchinson & Co.: London	1927	Novel
Episodes from the Road to Timbuktu	Unknown: London	1927	Travel
Jungle!	Hutchinson & Co.: London	1928	Novel
The Golden Land: A Record of Travel in West Africa	Duckworth & Co.: London	1929	Travel
A Different Drummer: Chapters in Autobiography	Duckworth & Co.: London	1930	Memoir
The Country of the Orinoco	Hutchinson & Co.: London	1931	Travel

== See also ==
- Cannibalism in Africa § Secret societies
