= Lady Anne Berry =

English-New Zealand horticulturist (1919–2019)

Berry in 1939.

Lady Anne Sophia Berry (née Walpole, formerly Palmer; 11 December 1919 – 18 September 2019) was an English-New Zealand horticulturist who founded Rosemoor Garden in Devon. She offered the garden to the Royal Horticultural Society in 1988. In 1990 she married Bob Berry and went to live on his farm at Tiniroto, Gisborne, New Zealand. She then created the Homestead Garden of Hackfalls Arboretum.

== Early life and family ==
Berry was born Lady Anne Sophia Walpole on 11 December 1919 at Wolterton Hall, Norfolk (Note: Also cited as 39 Ennismore Gardens, Westminster.) to Robert Walpole, 5th Earl of Orford and Emily Gladys (née Oakes). A member of the Walpole family, Berry was the younger half-sister of the writer Lady Dorothy Mills. Berry's half-brother Horatio Corbin Walpole (1891–1893) died in infancy and her elder sister, Lady Gladys Walpole (1918–1919), died 6 months before her birth

In 1923, Lord Orford bought a 40-acre (16 hectares (0.16 km^{2})) property called Rosemoor in North Devon as a fishing lodge. Berry and her mother lived there after 1928, interspersed with three visits to New Zealand in the 1930s. Thus Berry spent part of her youth in that country. The free life in New Zealand suited her. Berry did not go to school and had a governess, but she used to dodge her, going hunting.

In 1928, her father emigrated to Manurewa, New Zealand, where he died in 1931. As he had no male heir, the Orford title became extinct. Wolterton Hall and two older baronies, created in 1723 and 1756, passed to a distant male cousin.

Back in England as a debutante proved to be a restricting time with all the social niceties including being present at Court. Her mother created some of the earliest garden features at Rosemoor, such as the Stone Garden, which still lies at the heart of Berry's garden. On 25 November 1939, Berry married Colonel Eric Palmer. Her early married life was spent "camp following" the regiment, including two and a half years in Northern Ireland. Rosemoor was loaned to the Red Cross as a rest home for Londoners from the East End suffering the effects of the Blitz. Her first son John Robert Walpole was born on 6 March 1943, her second Anthony Eric Fletcher was born 4 November 1945.

== Horticulture ==
After the war her husband bought more land around Rosemoor and established a dairy farm. Berry's passion was horses in those days.

"Lady Anne's initiation into gardening was somewhat akin to the conversion of St. Paul." In 1959, Berry stayed in Algeciras, Spain, for two weeks to recuperate from measles. There she met Collingwood Ingram, a well-known English plantsman, who opened her eyes to the world of plants. Collingwood Ingram sent loads of plants to Rosemoor from his own garden in Benenden, Kent. This was the start of a marvellous collection. In 1960 serious development of the garden started. Soon there were other mentors such as Lionel Fortescue (The Garden House at Buckland Monachorum), the Heathcoat-Amory family of Knightshayes Court and others.

Berry rapidly grew a knowledge on conditions that plants needed. Travels to New Zealand and Australia, Papua New Guinea, Japan, North America and temperate South America allowed her to see plants and plant combinations growing in their natural habitats, and gave her opportunities to collect material.

In the late 1960s she joined the Royal Horticultural Society (RHS). Robin Herbert, who later became a president of RHS invited her to join Floral Committee 'B' which judged woody plants and new introductions. She was also a founder member of the National Council for the Preservation of Plants and Gardens (NCCPG).

In 1965 Berry joined the International Dendrology Society (IDS). In the 1970s she chaired the tours committee for nine years until about 1983. She then became chairperson of the society for nearly five years. In 1970 she visited New Zealand and went to see Eastwoodhill Arboretum, Ngatapa, Gisborne. Its founder, William Douglas Cook had died a few years before. "Despite its then run-down condition it was to me a very impressive collection, at that time managed single-handedly by Bill Crooks", she remembered. In 1977 a group of members of the IDS visited New Zealand again. She then nominated Eastwoodhill for the first brass plaque presented by the IDS for tree collections of outstanding merit. She then visited Abbotsford Arboretum (now Hackfalls Arboretum), the creation of Bob Berry for the first time.

In 1979 Berry started a small nursery at Rosemoor. By 1987 the catalogue had expanded to over 1000 items. She developed a collection of less common trees, and of Hollies (Ilex) and Dogwood (Cornus), later resulting in Rosemoor holding part of the UK NCCPG National Collection for these plants.

In 1980 her husband died. In 1988 she offered Rosemoor to the Royal Horticultural Society (RHS): the house and the garden (8 acres (0.032 km^{2})), and the remaining 32 acres (0.13 km^{2}) of the estate, that was farmland. By 1990 Rosemoor was opened as a "garden for all seasons".

In 1990 Berry led a group of IDS members to Hackfalls Arboretum for the second time. She married Bob Berry later that same year. "The story of Bob and Anne Berry of Hackfalls is a classic one in terms of the bonds created by dendrology". The marriage took place in England, but they came to live at Tiniroto.

In July 2006, Lady Anne and her husband left Hackfalls Station to live in Gisborne. Bob Berry died in 2018 aged 102; Lady Anne died 18 September 2019, three months short of her 100th birthday.

== Rosemoor Garden ==
Rosemoor Garden was created by Lady Anne over a period of some thirty years, from about 1960 to 1988. She described it as "a sort of mini Wisley". Wisley is the "flagship garden of the RHS". In 1988 she gave the garden to the Royal Horticultural Society, together with an additional 32 acres (13 ha) of land.

Christopher Bailes, curator of Rosemoor Garden, stated in 1988: "Lady Anne's garden was (and remains) a very personal garden, largely informal and relaxed in style, with extensive areas of parkland and arboretum. The 'new' RHS developments were intended both to expand upon and to complement the existing garden, featuring diverse and wide-ranging plantings, many in a more formal framework, with particular emphasis on ornamental and productive horticulture."

== Hackfalls Arboretum ==
Hackfalls Arboretum, Tiniroto, Gisborne, New Zealand, was the creation of Bob Berry, who started planting trees at his station in the 1950s, and created interesting collections of poplars, maples, oaks etc. Bob became a member of the IDS in 1977 and in October 1982 joined a tour to Mexico, which was the beginning of a particular interest in Central American Oaks (Quercus), which would later form the most important part of the collection of Hackfalls Arboretum. In later years other trips to Mexico followed to collect acorns.

When Anne came to live at Hackfalls Station in 1990 the management of the farm had already been taken over by Diane and Kevin Playle (Diane is a daughter of Bob Berry's sister Pet), the name being changed from Abbotsford Station to Hackfalls Station. Hackfalls Station had been the name of the original property of the Berry family at Tiniroto, when they first came to live there at the beginning of the 20th century. The collection of the arboretum at 1990 contained about 3,000 taxa. The number of different species of trees, shrubs and climbers has been enlarged since then. Anne extended the homestead garden at Hackfalls and introduced many new plantings.

In 1993 the arboretum was protected by a covenant with the Queen Elizabeth II National Trust.

Since 2006 Diane Playle takes care of the arboretum and the homestead garden. The collection at the arboretum in 2008 held 3,500 different taxa.

== Awards and honours ==
- 1986 – RHS Victoria Medal of Honour
- 1990 – Honorary Doctorate of Science at the University of Exeter
- 2002 – Hackfalls Arboretum received an IDS plaque.

== Sources ==
- Bailes, Christopher – Rosemoor Garden – Two Decades On (A Retrospective...). In: The Gardener's Journal, Christchurch NZ, ISSN 1178-5020, issue 3, August 2008, p. 35 – 42.
- Berry, John – A Man's Tall Dream; The Story of Eastwoodhill. Publ. by Eastwoodhill Trust Board, Gisborne 1997. ISBN 0-473-04561-3
- Colborn, Nigel – Lady Anne Palmer, Creator of Rosemoor. In: Hortus, Farnham, Surrey, UK, ISSN 0950-1657, Vol. One, No. 4, Winter 1987, p. 70 – 80
- Webster, Jonathan (2013), "RHS Garden Rosemoor: Today and Tomorrow", The Garden, 138 (3), Royal Horticultural Society: 45–48
- Wilkie, Martin – Bob and Lady Anne Berry, and Hackfalls Arboretum: a shared vision and a grand adventure. In: The Gardener's Journal, Christchurch NZ, ISSN 1178-5020, issue 1, February 2008, p. 13 – 22
