= Arthur F. H. Mills =

English novelist (1887–1955)

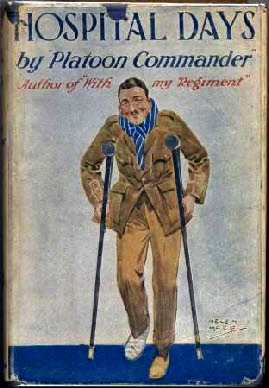
- The author pictured on the dust jacket of his 1916 memoir, Hospital Days
- Born: Arthur Frederick Hobart Mills; 12 July 1887; Bude, Cornwall, UKGBI
- Died: 18 February 1955 (aged 67); Milford on Sea, Hampshire, United Kingdom
- Occupation: Writer
- Spouse: Lady Dorothy Mills (m. 1916; div. 1933)
- Relatives: George Mills (half-brother); Sidney Hobart-Hampden-Mercer-Henderson (uncle); Arthur Mills (grandfather); Lady Anne Berry (ex-sister-in-law); Robert Walpole (ex-father-in-law)
- Writing career
- Genres: War; adventure; crime
- Notable works: With My Regiment: From the Aisne to La Bassée (1916); Hospital Days (1916); The Yellow Dragon (1925)

Arthur Frederick Hobart Mills (12 July 1887 – 18 February 1955) was a British writer and military Captain.

== Early life and education ==
Mills was born on 12 July 1887 in Bude, Cornwall to The Rev Barton Reginald Vaughan Mills and Lady Catherine Mary Hobart Hampden (died 1889). Mills' was the maternal nephew of the politician Sidney Hobart-Hampden-Mercer-Henderson, 7th Earl of Buckinghamshire and the paternal grandson of politician Arthur Mills. Mills' had three younger half-siblings from his father's second marriage to Elizabeth Edith Ramsay, including the schoolmaster and writer George Mills.

Mills was educated at Wellington College and Royal Military Academy Sandhurst.

== Career ==
Captain Mills was gazetted into the Duke of Cornwall's Light Infantry in 1908 and served in China, India and Palestine. He was wounded in World War I at La Bassée and wrote a pair of books, his first, about that experience: With My Regiment: From the Aisne to La Bassée (William Heinemann: London, 1915) and Hospital Days (T. Fisher Unwin: London, 1916) under the pseudonym "Platoon Commander". At his wedding to Lady Dorothy Walpole, daughter of the fifth Earl of Orford, in 1916, her wedding ring was made from a bullet that had been surgically removed from his ankle.

Despite favourable reviews, frequent impressions, and global translations of many of his earlier books (The Broadway Madonna, The Gold Cat), Mills eventually became known as a genre author of cheap crime and adventure novels. His work has been largely forgotten.

== Personal life ==
In 1916, Mills married the explorer, travel writer and memoirist Lady Dorothy Mills. Lady Dorothy Mills filed a divorce decree in 1932, on the grounds of her husband's infidelity. The divorce was granted the following year, and Mills married Monica Cecil Grant Mills (née Wilks) in the October.

On 18 February 1955, Mills died in Milford on Sea, Hampshire aged 67.

== Bibliography ==
Title	Publisher	Date	Pseudonym
With My Regiment: From the Aisne to La Bassée	Lippincott	1916	"Platoon Commander"
Hospital Days	Unwin	1916	"Platoon Commander"
Ursula Vanet	Bale	1921	
Pillars of Salt	Duckworth	1922	
The Primrose Path	Duckworth	1923	
The Yellow Dragon	Hutchinson	1924	
The Broadway Madonna	Unknown	1924	
The Gold Cat	Hutchinson	1925	
The Danger Game	Hutchinson	1926	
Live Bait	Hutchinson	1927	
Modern Cameos	Hutchinson	1928	
White Snake	Hutchinson	1928	
The Blue Spider	Collins	1929	
Pursued	Collins	1929	
The Apaché Girl	Collins	1930	
Intrigue Island	Collins	1930	
Escapade	Collins	1931	
Stowaway	Collins	1931	
One Man's Secret	Collins	1932	
Judgment of Death	Collins	1932	
Gentleman of Rio	Collins	1933	
Black Royalty	Collins	1933	
The Ant Heap	Hutchinson	1934	
Paris Agent	Collins	1935	
Brighton Alibi	Collins	1936	
Café in Montparnasse	Collins	1936	
French Girl	Collins	1937	
The Broken Sword	Collins	1938	
Jewel Thief	Collins	1939	
White Negro	Collins	1940	
Don't Touch the Body	Collins	1947	
Shroud of Snow	Evans	1950	
Last Seen Alive	Evans	1951	
Your Number Is Up	Evans	1952	
The Jockey Died First	Staples	1953	
The Maliday Mystery	Staples	1954	
