= 3rd Earl of Orford =

3rd Earl of Orford may refer to:

- George Walpole, 3rd Earl of Orford (1730–1791), British administrator, politician, and peer
- Horatio Walpole, 3rd Earl of Orford (1783–1858), British peer and politician
