= Lady Walpole =

Lady Walpole may refer to one of three relatives of British statesman, Robert Walpole:

- Catherine, Lady Walpole (1682–1737), first wife of Robert Walpole
- Maria, Lady Walpole (1702–1738), second wife of Robert Walpole
- Lady Elizabeth Walpole (1682–1736), sister of Robert Walpole

== See also ==
- Baron Walpole, a title in the peerage of Great Britain
