= 4th Earl of Orford =

4th Earl of Orford may refer to:

- Horace Walpole (1717–1797), later 4th Earl of Orford (second creation), English art historian, man of letters, antiquarian and Whig politician
- Horatio Walpole, 4th Earl of Orford (third creation) (1813–1894), British peer and Conservative politician
