= Wickmere =

Village in Norfolk, England

Coordinates: 52.85415°N 1.22631°E

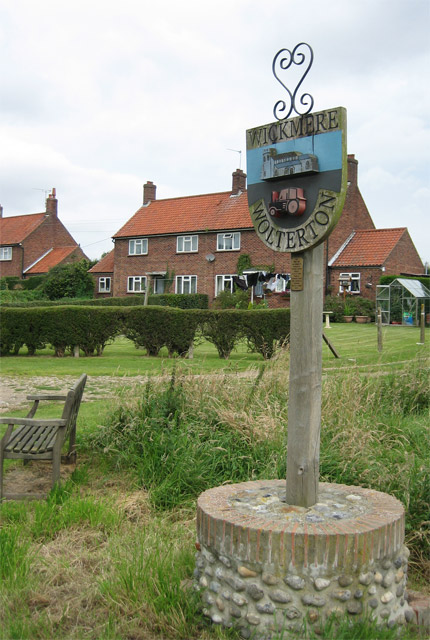
- The Village sign

- Location within Norfolk
- Area: 7.07 km^{2} (2.73 sq mi)
- Population: 158 (parish, 2011 census)
  - Density: 22/km^{2} (57/sq mi)
- OS grid reference: TG1733
  - London: 133 miles (214 km)
- Civil parish: Wickmere
- District: North Norfolk
- Shire county: Norfolk
- Region: East
- Country: England
- Sovereign state: United Kingdom
- Post town: NORWICH
- Postcode district: NR11
- Dialling code: 01263
- Police: Norfolk
- Fire: Norfolk
- Ambulance: East of England
- UK Parliament: North Norfolk

Wickmere is a village and a civil parish in the English county of Norfolk, 18.9 miles (30.4 km) north of Norwich, 7.3 miles (11.7 km) south-southwest of Cromer and 132 miles (212 km) northeast of London. The nearest railway station is at Gunton for the Bittern Line which runs between Sheringham, Cromer and Norwich. The nearest airport is Norwich International Airport. In the 2001 census it had a population of 125, which increased to 158 at the 2011 census. For the purposes of local government, the it falls within the district of North Norfolk.

== Description ==
Wickmere gets its name from the old English meaning Lake by a dairy farm. The village is made up of a few cottages built to provide accommodation for the workers on the near-by Wolterton Estate, which was once the family seat of the younger brother of the Prime Minister, Robert Walpole. The parish has a long history that pe-dates the Norman Conquest

== History ==
Over the years archaeological finds have proved that people have lived in the parish of Wickmere as far back as prehistoric times. These finds, made in 1991 take the form of prehistoric pot boiler. These flints represent the use of fire by the early inhabitants of the area for the purposes of heating water for cooking and washing.

=== Bronze Age ===
Evidence has also been uncovered of activity here in the Bronze Age with the find of Pieces of casting waste which might provide evidence for a metal working site in Wickmere. Discoveries by metal detectors of a copper alloy adza and an axe head, along with pottery shreds are more evidence of activity here in this period.

=== Roman period ===
Archaeological evidence has also found three possible Roman settlements around Wickmere. In these areas finds include Roman pottery, coins and casting waste, dolphin brooches, a spindle whorl, staff ferrule and part of an iron key.

=== The Norman period ===
Wickmere has an entry in the Domesday Book of 1085. In the great book Wickmere's population, land ownership and productive resources are documented. The parish recorded by the name of Wicmare or Wicmere. The parish is Kings land with main tenant being Tihel de Hellean, from the Bishop of Bayeux, William de Warenne, also Robert de Courson from Roger Bigot and the Abbot of Holme. The survey document revealed that the Benedictine Order held land here prior to 1066. It is also recorded that Wickmere had woodland, a share in a mill and numerous meadows.

== Prominent buildings ==
=== The parish church of Saint Andrew ===
This parish church is mainly constructed from carrstone and has a Saxo-Norman round tower and west wall. The rest of the church dates from the 14th century. The windows in the aisle and chancel are decorated with tracery and are in the perpendicular style. the nave roof is a king-post construction, whilst the chancel roof is of King post design. Inside the church some of the benches date from medieval period, there is a 15th-century screen which has been restored but still retains four original panels with paintings of saints, although only Saint Andrew with his cross can be recognised. There are several notable memorials in the church, in particular, the tomb of the fifth earl of Orford, Baron Robert Horace Walpole. A white marble cartouche with cherub heads at the corners is to Henry Spelman, a soldier, who died in Calcutta in the Bengal.

=== Wolterton Hall ===
South of the village is the estate of Wolterton Hall. The hall was built for Horatio Walpole between 1727 and 1741 and was designed by the architect Thomas Ripley. Constructed from red brick with stone dressing the building stands in the form of a block of seven by three bays. The elevations are plain without decoration with the plan of the house being of triple pile and is an early example of the palladian standard. On the garden side of the hall, George Repton added arcading and a staircase leading to a terrace in 1829. The interior of the house has fine examples of period fireplaces and plaster ceilings. Some restoration has been carried out in the 20th century. The Hall is a Grade II listed building.

=== The round tower of St Margaret’s Church ===
Within the grounds of Wolterton estate can be seen the remains of Saint Margaret's church. The round tower is all that remains of the church and the lost village of Wolterton which stood north of the church.

== Gallery ==
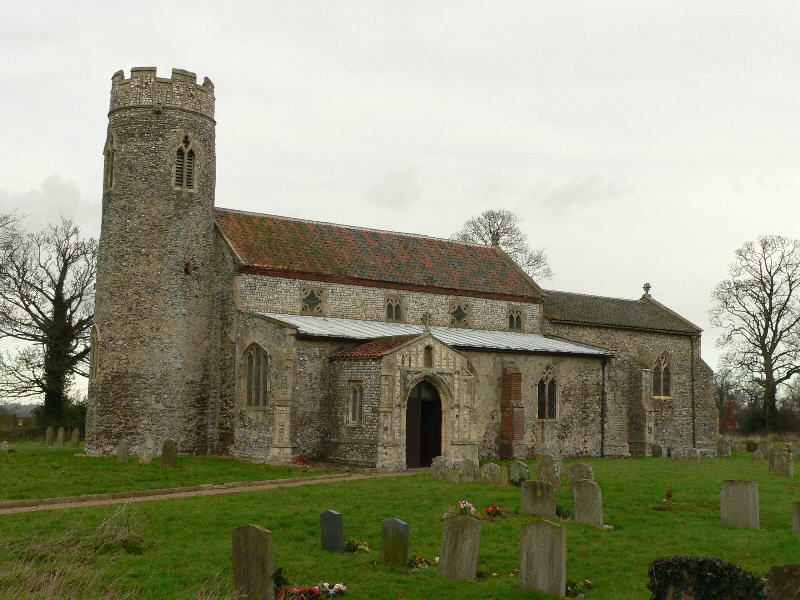
Saint Andrew Parish Church

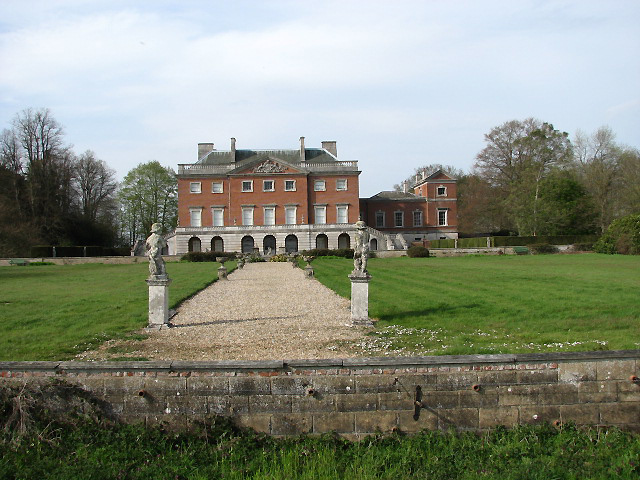
South elevation of Wolterton Hall

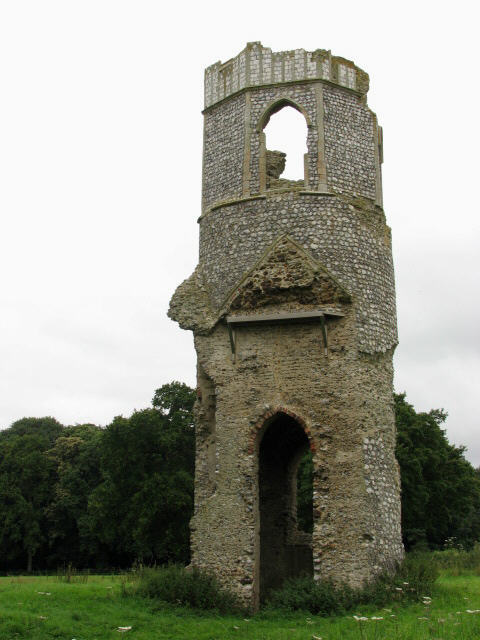
The remains of the round tower of Saint Margaret church
