= Robert Walpole, 10th Baron Walpole =

British politician (1938–2021)

The Right Honourable The Lord Walpole JP
- Lord Walpole in 2015

Member of the House of Lords
- Lord Temporal
- Hereditary peerage 19 September 1989 – 11 November 1999
- Preceded by: The 9th Baron Walpole
- Succeeded by: Seat abolished
- Elected Hereditary Peer; 11 November 1999 – 13 June 2017
- Election: 1999
- Preceded by: Seat established
- Succeeded by: The 12th Baron Vaux of Harrowden

Personal details
- Born: Robert Horatio Walpole; 8 December 1938
- Died: 8 May 2021 (aged 82)
- Party: Crossbench
- Spouse(s): Judith Schofield (m. 1962; div. 1979) Laurel Celia Ball (m. 1980)
- Children: 7, including Alice Walpole

Robert Horatio Walpole, 10th Baron Walpole of Walpole, 8th Baron Walpole of Wolterton (8 December 1938 – 8 May 2021), was a British politician who, as an excepted hereditary peer, was a member of the House of Lords until his retirement in 2017.

== Ancestors ==
Walpole was descended from Horatio Walpole, 1st Baron Walpole (of Wolterton), a younger brother of Sir Robert Walpole, the first British Prime Minister. He was the 10th and 8th Baron Walpole (of two different creations). His ancestors include Sir Robert's father, Colonel Robert Walpole (1650–1700).

== Education and local government career ==
He was educated at Eton and King's College, Cambridge, where he received a BA and an MA. He served on Norfolk County Council for eleven years from 1970 to 1981.

== House of Lords career ==
He entered the House on the death of his father in 1989. He was a crossbencher and was internally elected to continue serving after the House of Lords Act 1999 prevented most hereditary peers from sitting. He retired from Parliament on 13 June 2017.

== Family ==
Walpole and his first wife Judith (née Schofield, later Chaplin) had four children, including Jonathan Robert Hugh Walpole (his heir, born 16 November 1967) and the diplomat Alice Walpole. The couple divorced in 1979. In 1980, Walpole married Laurel Celia Ball, with whom he had three further children.

== Wealth and estates ==
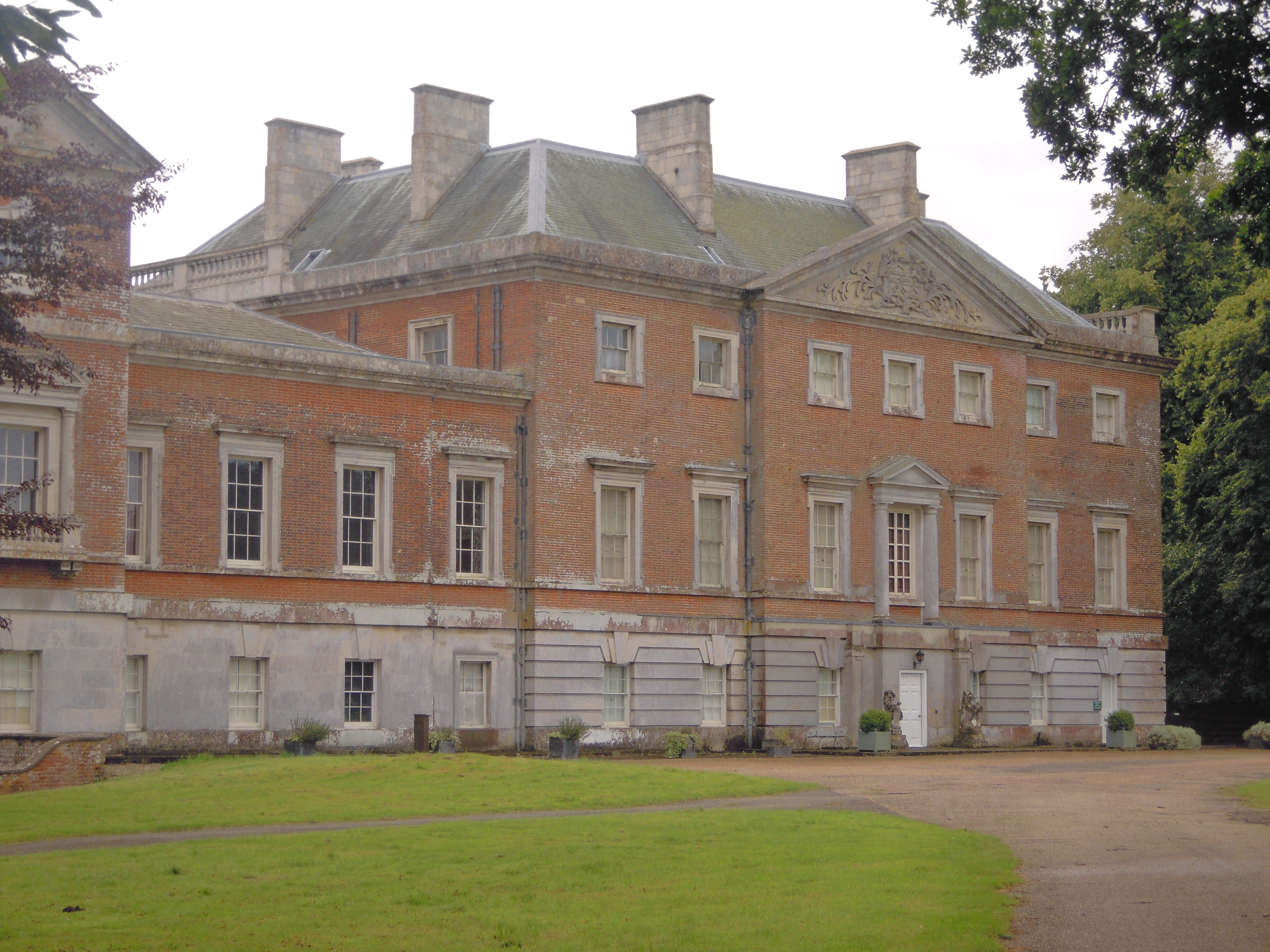
Wolterton Hall

His father's net estate at his death in February 1989 was sworn as £2,065,295 (equivalent to £5,465,000 in 2025). In April 2016 he sold Wolterton Hall, the house commissioned by his ancestor the 1st Baron Walpole of Wolterton in 1742, where Walpole and his father had lived. He lived nearby at Mannington Hall, a house owned by his family since the 18th century.

== Death ==
Walpole died on 8 May 2021, aged 82. The peerages were inherited by his eldest son, Jonathan Robert Hugh Walpole, who became the 11th Baron Walpole of Walpole and the 9th Baron Walpole of Wolterton.

Peerage of Great Britain
| Preceded by Robert Walpole | Baron Walpole of Walpole; 1989–2021; Member of the House of Lords (1989–1999) | Succeeded by Jonathan Walpole |
| Preceded by Robert Walpole | Baron Walpole of Wolterton; 1989–2021 | Succeeded by Jonathan Walpole |
Parliament of the United Kingdom
| New office created by the House of Lords Act 1999 | Elected hereditary peer to the House of Lords under the House of Lords Act 1999; 1999–2017 | Succeeded by The Lord Vaux of Harrowden |
