= Richard Walpole =

British politician

Richard Walpole (1728–1798) was a British politician who sat in the House of Commons from 1768 to 1784.

Walpole was born on 5 December 1728, the son of Horatio Walpole of Wolterton Hall and his wife Mary Magdalen Lombard. He was captain of an East Indiaman until 1758. He married Margaret Vanneck, daughter of Sir Joshua Vanneck, 1st Baronet, on 22 November 1757. He then became a banker and joined the London firm of Cliff, Walpole and Clarke. In 1763 he acted as agent for Clive and the East India Company opposition in creating voting qualifications.

In 1763 Walpole's brother Thomas, suggested him to Newcastle as a candidate for a vacancy at Lewes but he did not stand. In 1768 he was returned unopposed as Member of Parliament for Great Yarmouth on his family interest. He was re-elected for Great Yarmouth after a contest in 1774 and was elected again in 1780. He did not stand in 1784.

Walpole died on 18 August 1798.

Parliament of Great Britain
Preceded by Charles Townshend (Sir) Edward Walpole	Member of Parliament for Great Yarmouth; 1768–1778; With: Charles Townshend	Succeeded by Captain Sir John Jervis; Henry Beaufoy
