= William Augustus Fawkener =

British civil servant and diplomat

William Augustus Henry Fawkener (28 December 1747 – 26 July 1811) was a British civil servant and diplomat.

== Background ==
William Fawkener was born late in 1747, one of the sons of Sir Everard Fawkener (also spelt Fawkner), a merchant and then British Ambassador to the Ottoman Empire, who did not marry until he was aged 53, and thus died in 1758 while William was still young. His mother was Harriotte (Harriet) Churchill, daughter of Lieutenant General Charles Churchill. William was probably named in honour of his father's patron Prince William, Duke of Cumberland, and served as a page of honour at the Duke's funeral in 1765.

His brother Everard also became a civil servant, holding the post of Commissioner of Stamps from 1783 to 1803, obtained through William's influence.

== Privy Council clerk ==
William was appointed a Clerk of the Privy Council in 1779. He held this post until at least 1795.

During his service to the Privy Council, he was employed on various diplomatic missions. In 1783 he was appointed as secretary of the embassy to the Marquess of Carmarthen, who was appointed ambassador to France, but was instead appointed Foreign Secretary before he departed. In April 1787, he was Envoy Extraordinary to the Grand Duchy of Tuscany. In October 1787, he was sent as an envoy to Portugal to negotiate a commercial treaty in conjunction with Robert Walpole, the Minister resident there.

In 1791, he was sent on a secret mission to Catherine II of Russia.

Details of his later career are unclear.

For a period, he worked as the secretary of William Windham, the secretary for war and the colonies. He was sent letters from British subjects living and working in Haiti from 1806 to 1807.

== Family and private life ==
He married Georgiana Ann, daughter of William Poyntz of Midgham House, Berkshire. The marriage was an arranged one and not to the liking of Georgiana. She met Hon. John Townshend at Lord Melbourne's house, Brocket Hall in the summer of 1785, fell in love, and eloped with him. The result was a duel in Hyde Park in May 1786 between Fawkener and Melbourne, in which the former missed and the latter fired into the air, ending without bloodshed. Fawkener subsequently brought an action against Townshend for criminal conversation. The trial began on 12 July 1786 before Sir Francis Buller, and ended with the award of £500 (equivalent to £68,000 in 2025) in damages to Fawkener. Fawkener obtained a divorce by Act of Parliament in April 1787, whereupon Georgiana married Hon. John Townshend.

He married again to Elizabeth Wright. They had two daughters:

- Mary Wilhelmina Augustine Henrietta (1788 – 4 February 1860), married her cousin Horatio Walpole
- Sarah (27 May 1789 – 31 October 1817 London), born in Iping, married General Henry Frederick Compton Cavendish and died in London

He inherited an estate at Iping in Sussex in 1760, but he and his first wife apparently sold this in 1784. He lived at Brereton Hall, Shropshire. However his address was South Street, Grosvenor Square, Middlesex in 1789.

In 1811, he died unexpectedly at his home "of an apoplectic fit" at Bath, while active as Clerk of the Privy Council. He died while his daughters' weddings were being planned. He left each of his daughters an inheritance of £40,000 (equivalent to £2,793,000 in 2025).
