= Wolterton Hall =

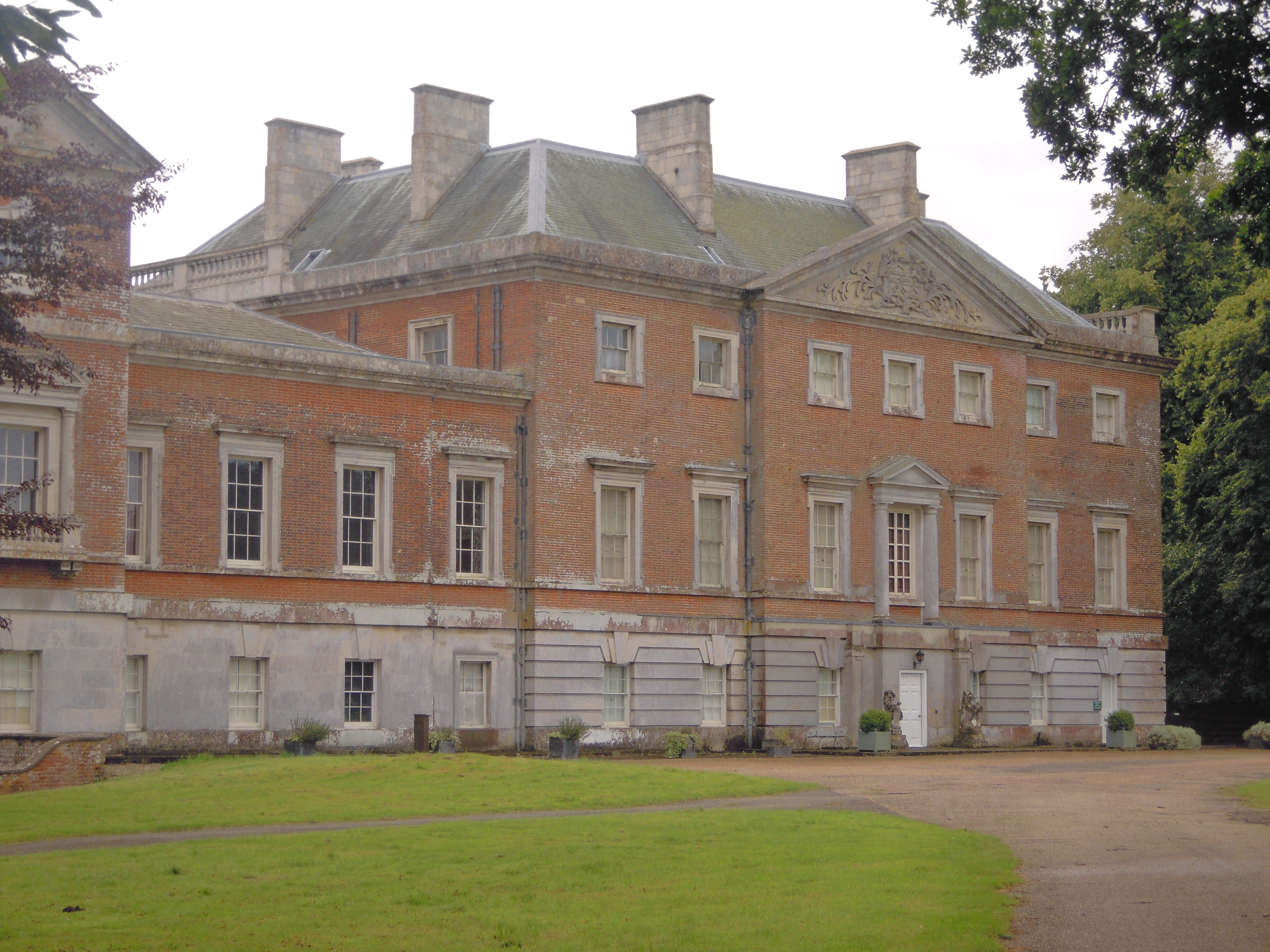
- North elevation

- Location within Norfolk

General information
- Type: Historic house
- Architectural style: Georgian
- Location: Near Aylsham, Norfolk, NR11 7LY, England
- Coordinates: 52.840635°N 1.210311°E
- Completed: 1742
- Inaugurated: 1725
- Renovated: 1828
- Client: Horatio Walpole

Technical details
- Structural system: Brick, Portland stone cladding (ground floor)

Design and construction
- Architects: Thomas Ripley; George Stanley Repton (east wing, 1828)
- Other designers: Charles Bridgeman (parkland and lake); William Gilpin (gardens)

Website
- Wolterton Hall website

Listed Building – Grade I
- Designated: 25 February 1952
- Reference no.: 1049875

Wolterton Hall, is a large country house in the ecclesiastical parish of Wickmere with Wolterton and the civil parish of Wickmere in the county of Norfolk, England, United Kingdom. The present hall was commissioned by Horatio Walpole, 1st Baron Walpole of Wolterton and completed in 1742. It was designed by the architect Thomas Ripley who was a protégé of Lord Walpole and his brother Sir Robert Walpole.

== Etymology ==
The name Wolterton (Ultretune) devolved from the Anglo-Saxon language and has the meaning of Wulfthryth’s (a woman) enclosure (tun or ton) settlement or farm.

== History ==
The present hall and estate was once occupied by an early manor house, owned by Sir Henry Spelman, and the village of Wolterton which was abandoned leaving only the remains of the parish church tower which stands a short distance north of the present hall. Evidence shown on a map produced in 1733 shows that the deserted settlement of Wolterton lay a little north of the church and consisted of several houses clustered around a village green. The village of Wolterton is mentioned in the Domesday Book where it is listed under the names Ultertuna and Wivetuna. The survey shows main landholder of Wolterton was the Norman nobleman William de Warenne. The listing shows 4 smallholders on the land with 1/2 a plough team on 16 acres. Land was also held by the Abbot of St. Benedict of Holme before 1066 and was valued at 16 shillings (80p), but at the time of the survey it was valued at 20 shillings (£1). The manor is 6 furlongs in length and 5 in width and had a tax value of 2 1/2d (approx. 1p). The main tenant was Ralph of Beaufour.

=== Horatio Walpole ===
Horatio Walpole, 1st Baron Walpole of Wolterton, acquired the manor house and estate at Wolterton in 1722, which he decided to renovate. Walpole was the younger brother of Sir Robert Walpole, 1st Earl of Orford, who was a British statesman who is generally regarded as the first Prime Minister of Great Britain. Horatio was a politician and diplomat, like his brother, and he had spent time at The Hague and had also been the Ambassador to France in Paris between 1724 and 1730. Horatio's plans for the estate were jeopardised in 1724 when a fire swept the house destroying the structure. The architect Thomas Ripley was engaged to advise Walpole on the rebuild required.

=== Construction ===
Responsibility for the design and construction of the new hall was given to Thomas Ripley. He had previously been engaged by Horatio's brother Robert to re-develop the Great House at Houghton. His design was for a neoclassical country house with a rectangular plan over three storeys. The ground floor was faced with Portland stone, with the upper storeys faced in pale red brick which were produced locally. Sash windows were installed surrounded by eared and shouldered stone architraves. The window heads were of plain stone pediments with cornice. The main entrance was on the north elevation of the house was flanked either side with Tuscan columns and headed with a plain stone cornice and pediment and was accessed by means of an exterior staircase (removed in the 19th century). This entrance is now a window following alterations made in the 19th century. The roof was constructed with Welsh slate.

=== Alterations and additions ===
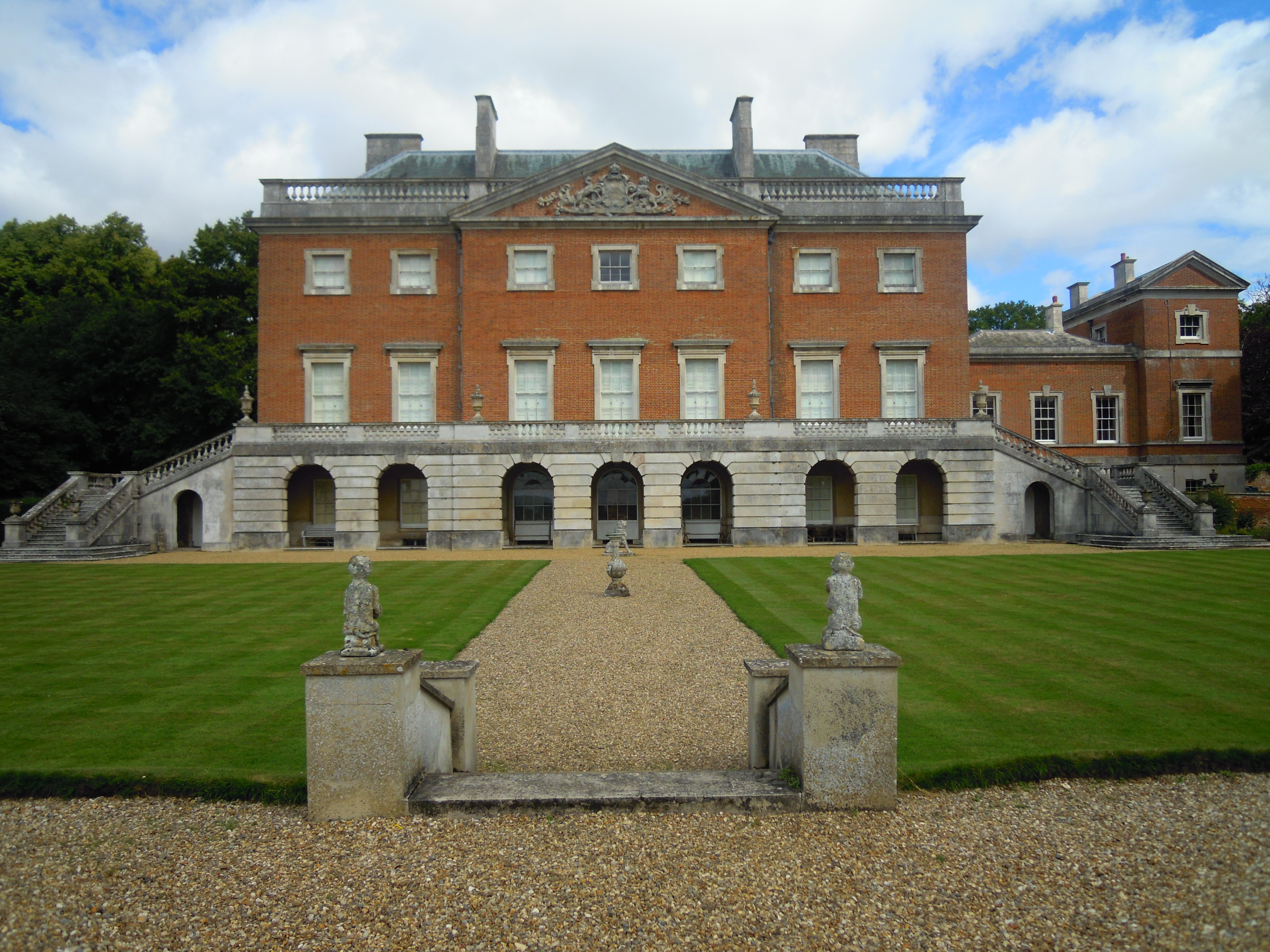
Wolterton Hall

Horatio Walpole, 3rd Earl of Orford, the great-grandson of Horatio Walpole, inherited the hall and he initiated many alterations to it. In 1828 Horatio commissioned the architect George Repton, who was the fourth son of Humphry Repton the landscape designer, to build a new Palladian wing on the east elevation of the hall. This consisted of a two-storey four bay link to a fifth three storey bay creating a pedimented palladian pavilion. He also added the Portland stone arcade to the south elevation which consisted of seven semi-circular arches with a balustrade terrace balcony above. At each end of the arcade he constructed an open staircase which led from the terrace down to the gardens below.

=== The interior ===
The interior designs for the hall included a marble hall which was formerly the entrance hall before Repton's alterations to the entrance in 1828. The room has four mahogany doors which were a gift of Queen Caroline, the wife of George II. The room also contains a fireplace with an overmantel of white marble and coloured agate by Richard Fisher of Ripon. The room has a classical motif stucco ceiling and a floor inlaid with polished limestone from the Swedish island of Öland. The house has a central domed full-height stairwell with a stone cantilevered staircase with a lyre-shaped wrought iron balustrade topped with a banded mahogany handrail. Horatio Walpole's study was decorated and designed by Italian painter Jacopo Amigoni in the late-Baroque/Rococo style. Other rooms of the house are also embellished with fire-surrounds by Fisher (eight in total), and many of the walls have family portrait paintings.

=== Parklands and gardens ===
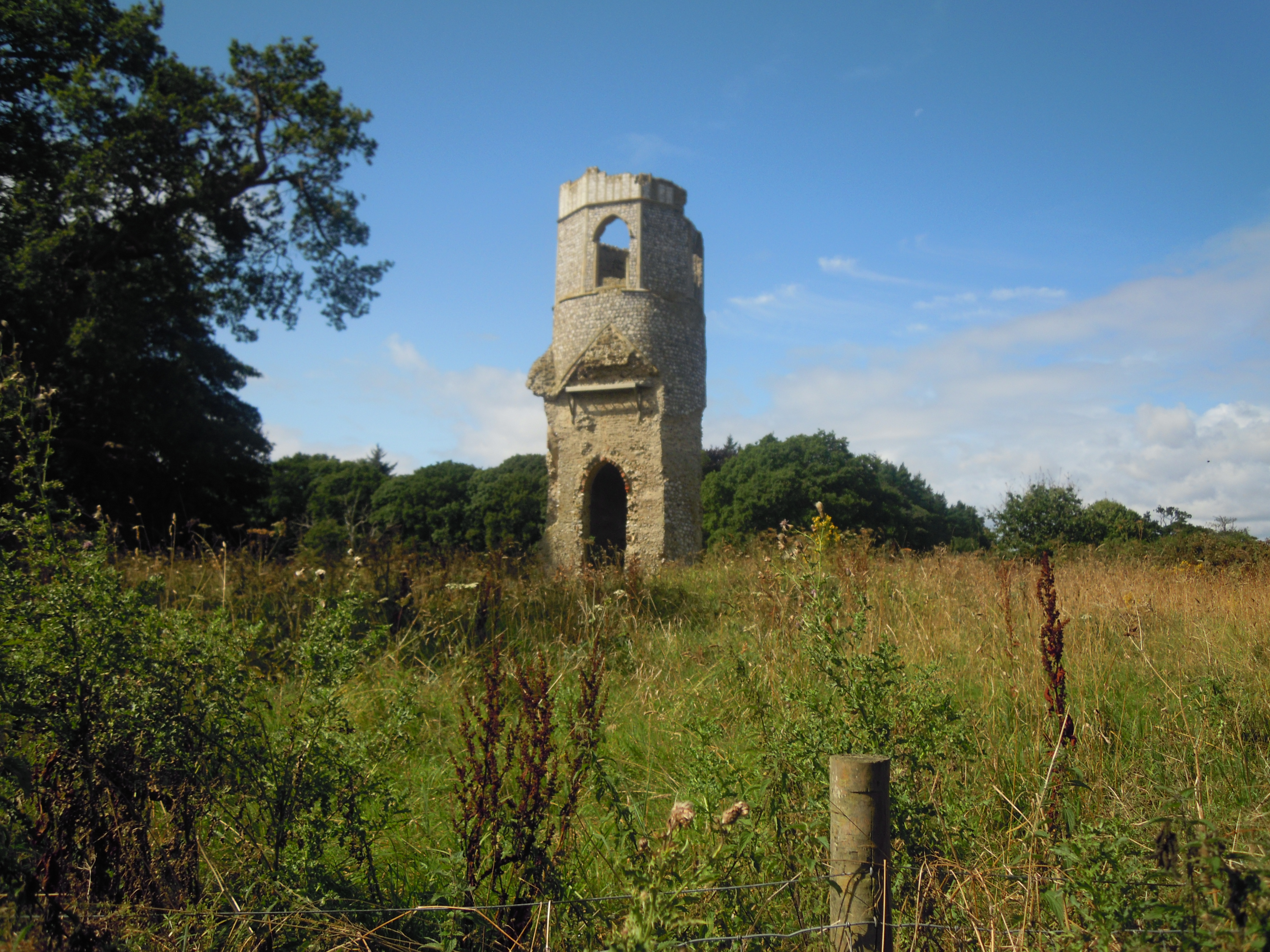
Ruins of St Margaret's Church

The hall is surrounded by parkland and gardens which were designed and built by the garden designer Charles Bridgeman. His design also included the creation of a lake, from an earlier water feature, in 1725 to the south of the hall. The lake was enhanced in 1830s with the addition of an island which was planted with cedar trees.

The former medieval parish church of St Margaret's is now a ruin with only the round tower standing. Made of knapped flint with brick and stone dressings, it is a Grade II* listed building and a scheduled ancient monument.

== The establishment of Norfolk turkeys ==
In the written memoirs of Lady Dorothy Nevill, she recalls in her manuscript Mannington and the Walpoles, Earls of Orford (1894) that her great-grandfather Horatio Walpole, 1st Baron Walpole of Wolterton, was given an goodly sinecure by his brother Robert for the sum of £3,000 per annum. This allowed Horatio to acquire hardwood, mainly walnut to make up the doors windows and shutters for the hall. Horatio also imported a quantity of the American turkeys which were kept in the woods around Wolterton and in all probability were the embryo flock for the popular Norfolk turkey breeds of today.

== Later history ==
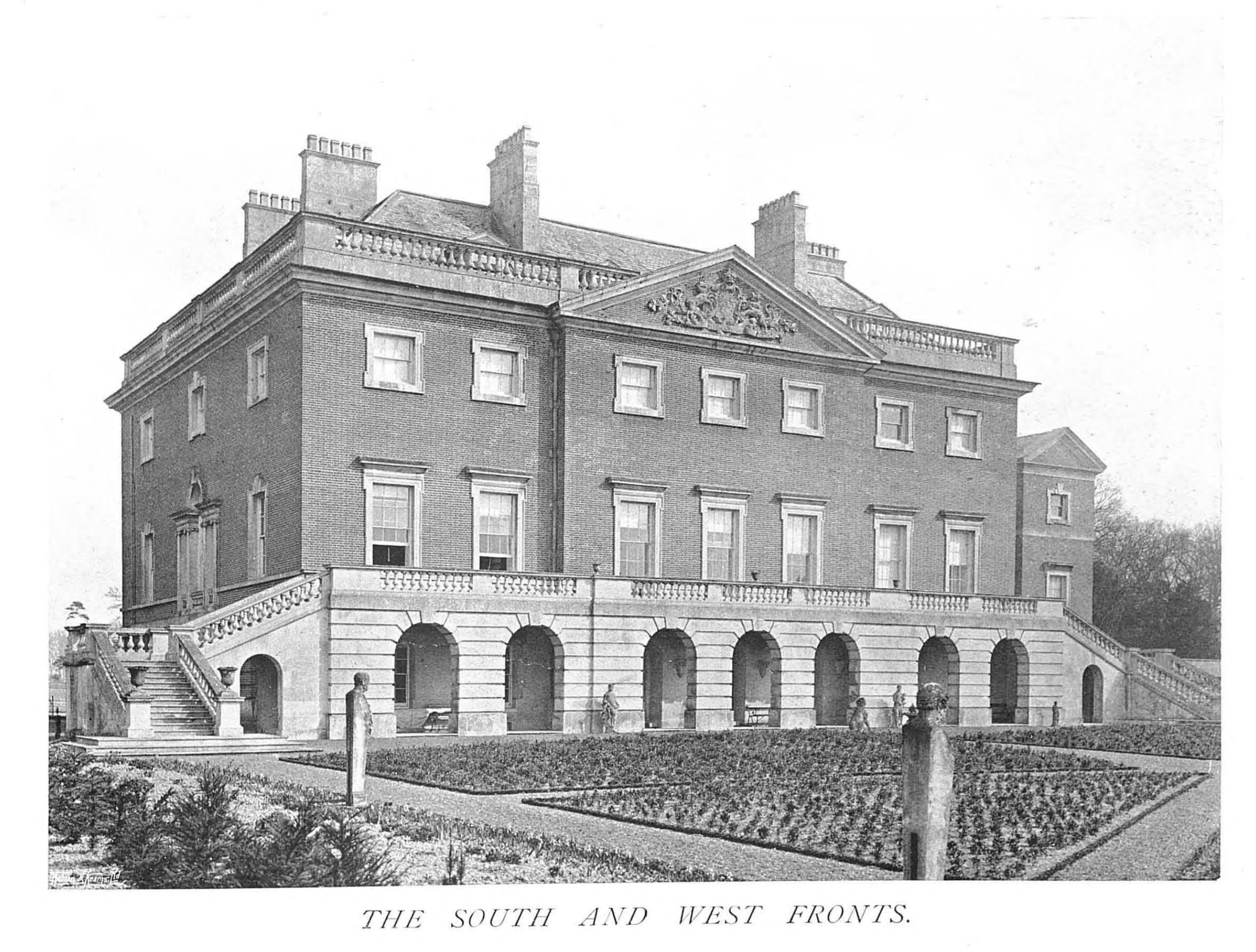
South and West fronts

The Walpoles remained in residence at Wolterton until the death of Horatio Walpole, 3rd Earl of Orford, in 1858. The 4th Earl, also called Horatio, went to live at near-by Mannington Hall, and Wolterton remained empty until the 1900s. In 1905 restoration work began at the instigation of Robert Walpole, 5th Earl of Orford, who was the nephew of the 4th Earl. He moved back into Wolterton from Mannington and remained there until he died in 1931.

Having no heir, the 5th Earl left the house and estate to a member of the junior line of the Walpole family, Robert Henry Walpole, who became both the 7th Baron Walpole of Wolterton and 9th Baron Walpole of Walpole; he was descended from Thomas Walpole, the second son of the 1st Baron Walpole of Wolterton.

The 7th/9th Baron opened the house up to visits from the general public in 1950.

Disaster struck in 1952 when a fire broke out in one of the bedrooms on the second floor, gutting the whole floor and caused serious water damage to the room below after the fire brigade had successfully put out the fire. The fire brigade, estate workers, neighbours and a group of boys from Old Buckenham Hall preparatory school all worked together to save much of the house's contents, with the fire brigade noted for their courage in retrieving many priceless works of art and furniture from the less accessible area engulfed in the fire.

Lord Walpole began the restoration of the hall soon after the fire and after three years the hall was back open to the public.

In 1989 the hall and estate were inherited by his son the 8th/10th Baron Walpole, who made his home at nearby Mannington Hall. He was quoted as saying that he was committed to the conservation of the hall and its estate. Despite this he sold several hundred acres of land in 1999 and put the hall and 500 acres of land on the market for sale in 2015.

In April 2016, the house and parkland were bought by interior designers Peter Sheppard and Keith Day, who embarked upon a restoration project. In 2022, the restoration won a Georgian Group Architectural Award and was joint winner of a Historic Houses Association award.

In 2023, Wolterton Hall was sold to local businessman Richard Ellis and his family. In 2025, they opened the estate to the public, aiming to run it as a sustainable business. Burberry's autumn/winter 2025 campaign, starring Rupert Everett and Luther Ford, was shot at the house.

== Gallery ==
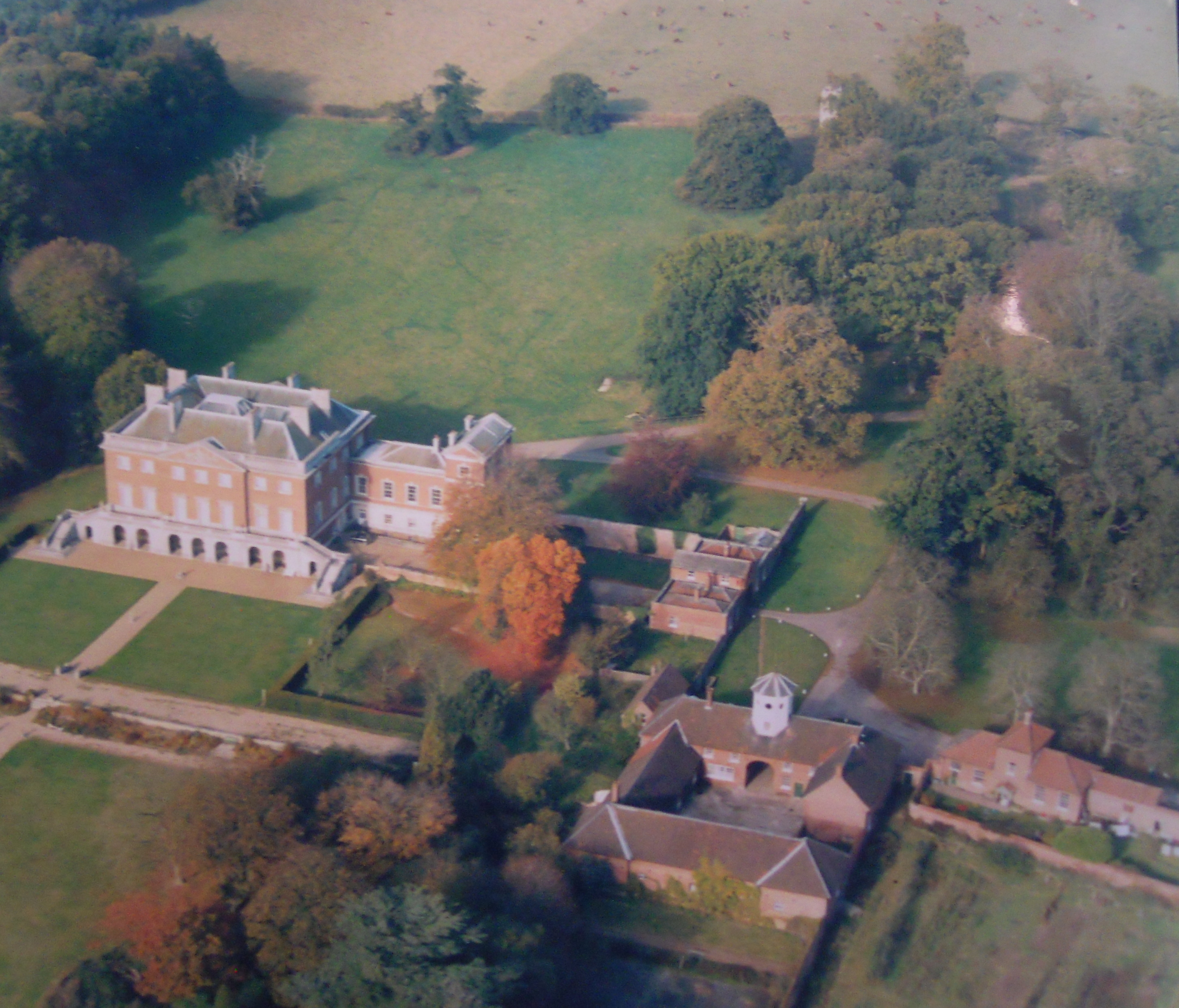
Aerial view

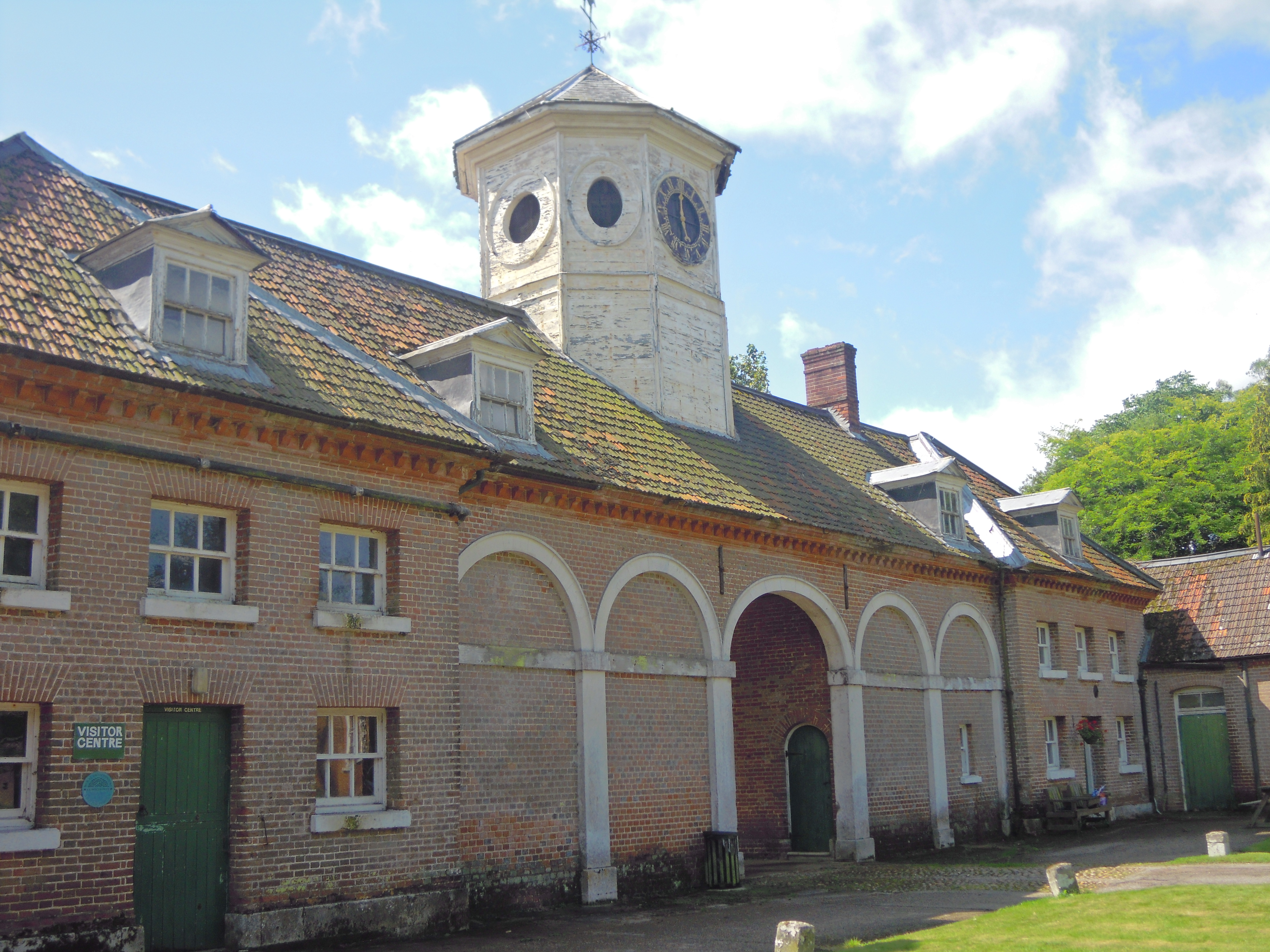
Stable block

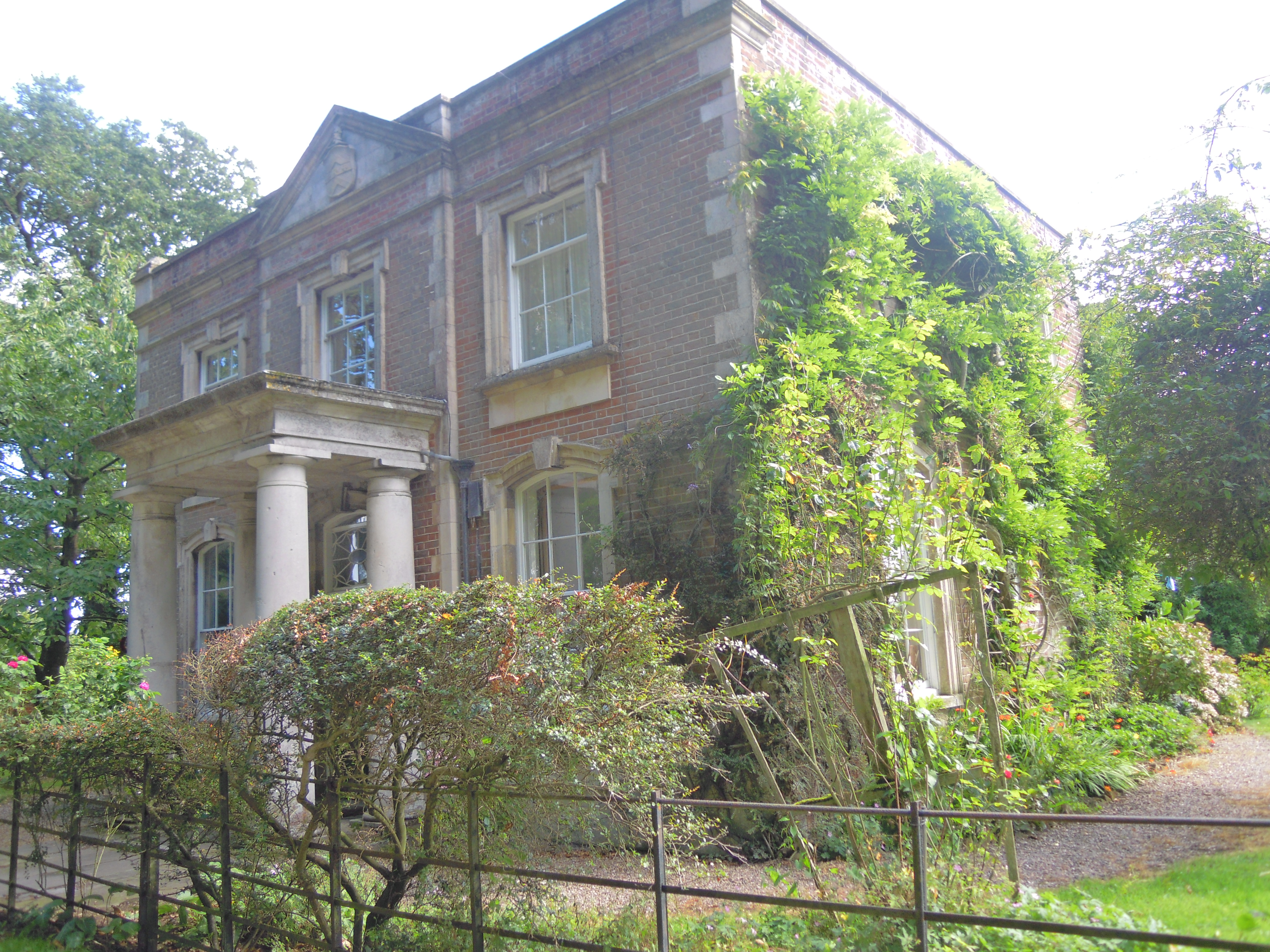
Gate lodge

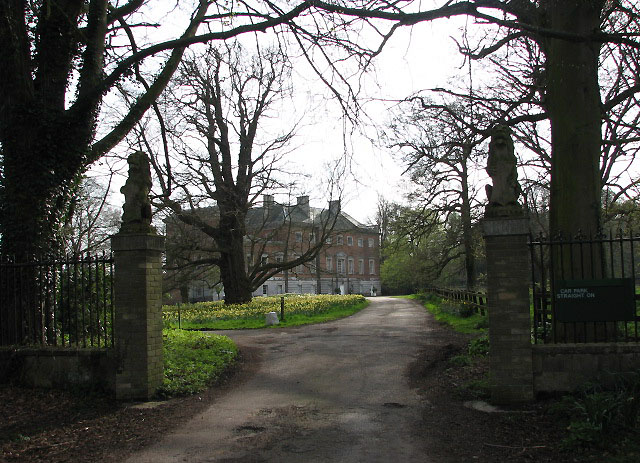
Driveway entrance

Attribution

"Walpole, Horatio (1678-1757)" . Dictionary of National Biography. London: Smith, Elder & Co. 1885–1900.
