= Robert Walpole, 5th Earl of Orford =

British peer, diplomat, soldier and Royal Navy officer

The Right Honourable Robert Walpole DL
- Earl of Orford
- Coat of arms
- Tenure: 1894–1931
- Predecessor: Horatio Walpole, 4th Earl of Orford
- Successor: Extinct
- Full name: Robert Horace Walpole
- Born: 10 July 1854
- Died: 27 September 1931 (aged 77)
- Spouses: Louise Melissa Walpole (m. 1888; died 1909); Emily Gladys Walpole (m. 1917)
- Issue: Horatio Corbin Walpole; Lady Dorothy Mills; Lady Gladys Walpole; Lady Anne Berry
- Father: Frederick Walpole

Robert Horace Walpole, 5th Earl of Orford DL (10 July 1854 – 27 September 1931), was a British peer, Foreign Office diplomat, soldier, and Royal Navy officer.

== Background ==
The son of Commander Hon. Frederick Walpole (1822–1876), R.N., M.P. for North Norfolk (son of Horatio Walpole, 3rd Earl of Orford) and his cousin Laura Sophia Frances Walpole, daughter of Francis Walpole (grandson of Horatio Walpole, 1st Baron Walpole, and nephew of Horatio Walpole, 4th Earl of Orford), Orford succeeded to the earldom on the death of his uncle, on 7 December 1894. He was educated at Eton.

== Career ==
Orford was a Lieutenant in the Royal Navy, serving on HMS Blanche on the Australian station in the early 1870s, from where he visited New Zealand, New Guinea, Fiji, and other Pacific Islands. He was later commissioned a Captain, 4th Battalion, Norfolk Regiment. He was part of the Earl of Rosslyn's Special Embassy to the wedding of King Alfonso XII of Spain and Mercedes of Orléans on 9 January 1878, returning 6 February that year. On 10 August 1878, he was attached as private secretary to his cousin Sir Henry Drummond Wolff, H.M. Commissioner to Eastern Rumelia, and served in that same capacity on Wolff's assignment to Egypt in 1885.

He was a Deputy Lieutenant and Justice of the Peace.

== Personal life ==
On 17 May 1888, Walpole married Louise Melissa Walpole (née Corbin; 1866–1909), daughter of the American mining and railway magnate Daniel Chase Corbin, at the Chapel of the British Embassy in Paris. The couple had two children, Horatio Corbin Walpole (1891–1893) and the explorer, travel writer and memoirist Lady Dorothy Mills. In 1916, Lady Dorothy Mills married Arthur F. H. Mills, Walpole disapproved of the match and disinherited his daughter.

On 15 September 1917, Walpole married Emily Gladys Walpole (née Oakes; 1891–1988), with whom he had the daughters Lady Gladys Walpole (1918–1919) and the horticulturist Lady Anne Berry. Through Lady Anne Berry, Walpole was the father-in-law of Colonel Joseph Eric Palmer (1903–1980) and the Robert Berry, a dendrologist.

== Arms ==
Coat of arms of Robert Walpole, 5th Earl of Orford
| Crest The bust of a man in profile couped proper, ducally crowned or, from the coronet flowing a long cap turned forwards gules tasselled and charged with a catherine wheel gold. Escutcheon Or, on a fess between. two chevrons sable, three crosses crosslet of the first. Supporters Dexter, an antelope; sinister, a stag argent, attired proper, each gorged with a collar chequy or and azure chained gold. Motto Fari quæ sentiat (To speak what he feels). |

Full quarterings of The Earl of Orford

Peerage of the United Kingdom
| Preceded by Horatio Walpole | Earl of Orford; 3rd creation 1894–1931 | Extinct |
Peerage of Great Britain
| Preceded by Horatio Walpole | Baron Walpole of Walpole; 1894–1931 | Succeeded by Robert Walpole |
| Preceded by Horatio Walpole | Baron Walpole of Wolterton; 1894–1931 | Succeeded by Robert Walpole |
