= Earl of Orford =

Earldom in the Peerage of Great Britain

Earldom of Orford
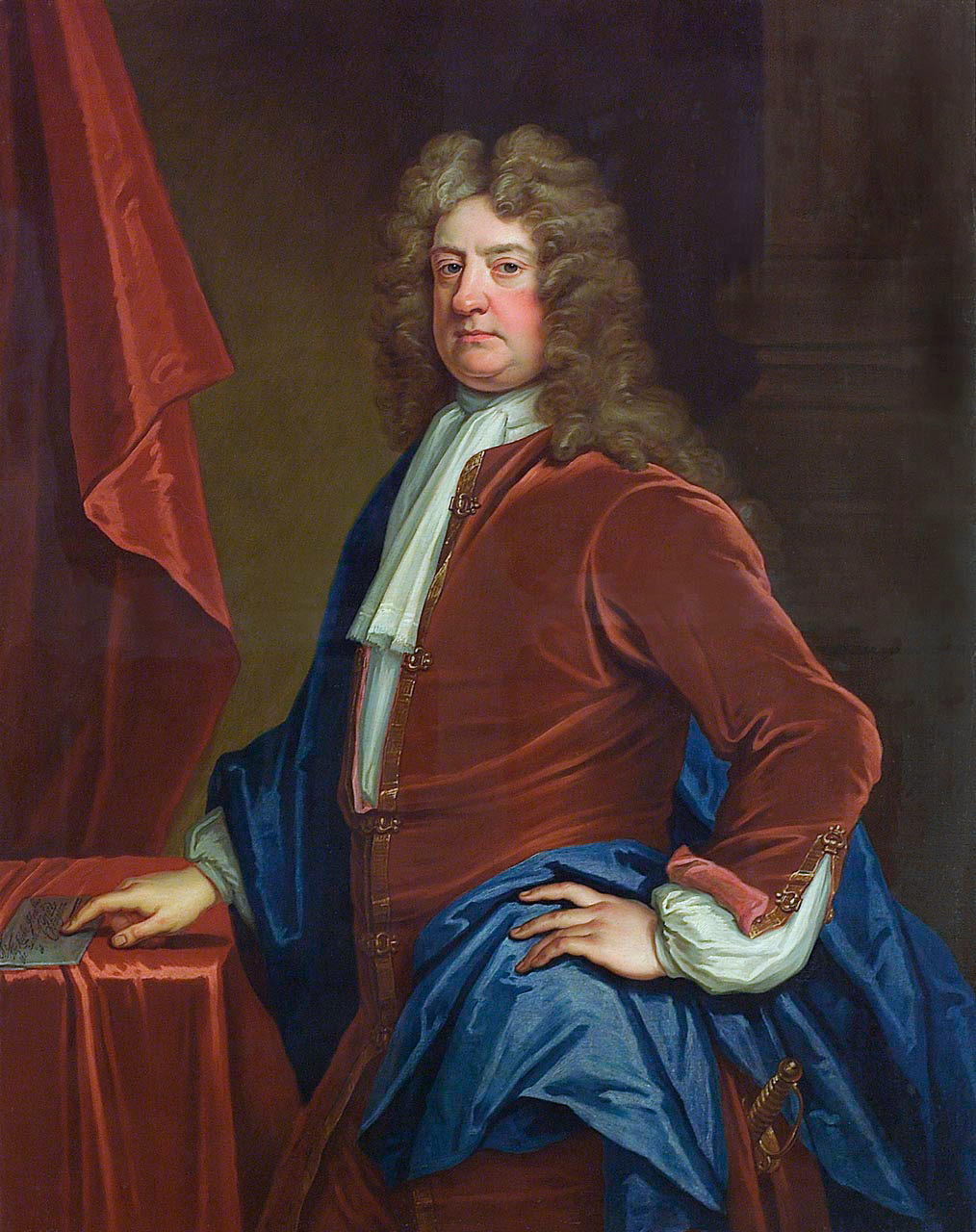
- Edward Russell, 1st Earl of Orford
- Creation date: 1806; 220 years ago
- Creation: Third
- Created by: George III
- Peerage: Peerage of the United Kingdom
- First holder: Edward Russell, 1st Earl of Orford (first creation; 1697)
- Last holder: Robert Horace Walpole, 5th Earl of Orford
- Remainder to: the 1st Earl's heirs male of the body lawfully begotten.
- Subsidiary titles: Baron Walpole
- Status: Extinct
- Extinction date: 27 September 1931

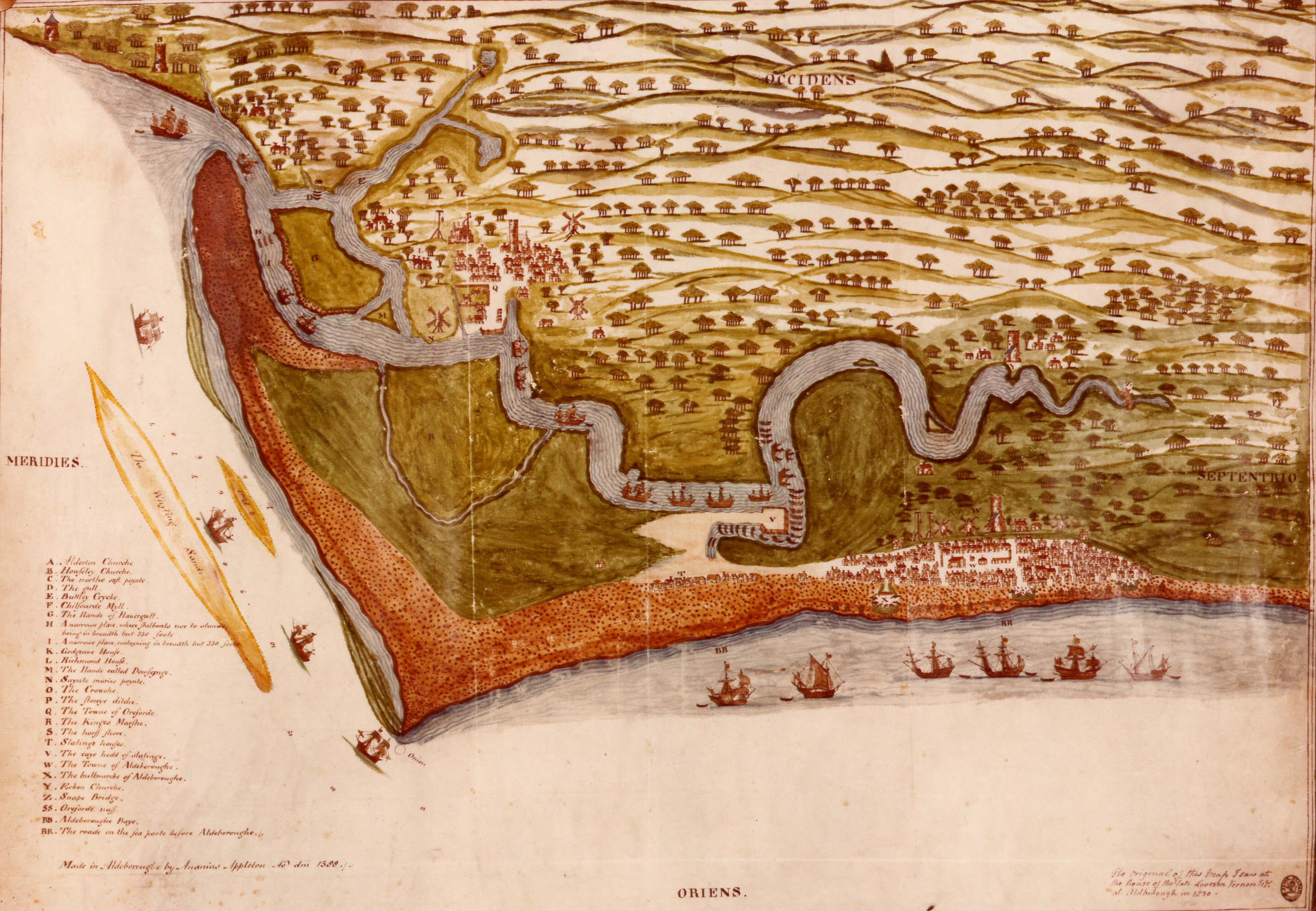
The title derives from Orford, Suffolk, an important port in the Tudor era (1588 image).

Earl of Orford is a title that has been created three times.

The first creation came in the Peerage of England in 1697 when the naval commander Admiral of the Fleet Edward Russell was made Earl of Orford, in the County of Suffolk. He was created Baron of Shingay, in the County of Cambridge, and Viscount Barfleur at the same time, also in the Peerage of England. A member of the influential Russell family, he was the son of the Honourable Edward Russell, a younger son of Francis Russell, 4th Earl of Bedford and younger brother of William Russell, 1st Duke of Bedford (see Duke of Bedford for earlier history of the Russell family). Lord Orford had no children and the titles became extinct on his death in 1727.

The title was created again in the Peerage of Great Britain in 1742 for Robert Walpole, de facto acknowledged to have been the first Prime Minister of Great Britain, who at the same time was created Viscount Walpole and Baron Walpole of Houghton. At the time, the family seat was Houghton Hall, which was owned and commissioned by Robert Walpole. The titles became extinct on the death of the 4th Earl in 1797.

It was created a third time in the Peerage of the United Kingdom in 1806 for Horatio Walpole, 4th Baron Walpole of Walpole, a cousin of the 4th Earl of the 2nd creation. The title became extinct in 1931.

== Earls of Orford ==
=== First creation, 1697 ===
- Edward Russell, 1st Earl of Orford (1657–1727)

=== Second creation, 1742 ===
- Robert Walpole, 1st Earl of Orford (1676–1745)
- Robert Walpole, 2nd Earl of Orford (1701–1751)
- George Walpole, 3rd Earl of Orford (1730–1791)
- Horace Walpole, 4th Earl of Orford (1717–1797)

=== Third creation, 1806 ===
- Horatio Walpole, 1st Earl of Orford (1723–1809)
- Horatio Walpole, 2nd Earl of Orford (1752–1822)
- Horatio Walpole, 3rd Earl of Orford (1783–1858)
- Horatio William Walpole, 4th Earl of Orford (1813–1894)
- Robert Horace Walpole, 5th Earl of Orford (1854–1931)

=== Family tree ===
Family tree of the Earls of Bedford, Dukes of Bedford, Earls of Orford, and Earls Russell

King Edward III; 1312–1377
John of Gaunt; 1340–1399; Duke of Lancaster
King Henry IV; 1367–1413	Joan Beaufort c. 1379–1440
Duke of Bedford (1st creation), 1414; Duke of Bedford (2nd creation), 1433
King Henry V 1386–1422	John of Lancaster; 1389–1435; Duke of Bedford
Dukedom of Bedford (1st creation) extinct, 1432; Dukedom of Bedford (2nd creation) extinct, 1435
Catherine of Valois; 1401–1437	Owen Tudor; 1400–1461	Cecily Neville; 1415–1495	Richard Neville; 1400–1460; 5th Earl of Salisbury
Duke of Bedford (5th creation), 1485
King Henry VI; 1421–1471	Edmund Tudor c. 1430–1456; 1st Earl of Richmond	Jasper Tudor c. 1431–1495; Duke of Bedford	King Edward IV; 1442–1483	King Richard III; 1452–1485	John Neville c. 1431–1471; 1st Marquess of Montagu
Dukedom of Bedford (5th creation) extinct, 1495
Duke of Bedford (4th creation), 1478	Duke of Bedford (3rd creation), 1470
King Henry VII; 1457–1509	Elizabeth of York; 1466–1503	George Plantagenet; 1477–1479; Duke of Bedford	George Neville c. 1457–1483; Duke of Bedford
Baron Russell of Cheneys, 1539; Earl of Bedford (3rd creation), 1551	Dukedom of Bedford (4th creation) extinct, 1479	Dukedom of Bedford (3rd creation) extinct, 1478
John Russell c. 1485–1555; 1st Earl of Bedford, etc.
Francis Russell; 1527–1585; 2nd Earl of Bedford, etc.
Baron Russell of Thornhaugh, 1603
Edward Russell; 1551–1572 styled Lord Russell	John Russell c. 1553–1584 styled Lord Russell	Francis Russell c. 1554–1585 styled Lord Russell	William Russell c. 1558–1613; 1st Baron Russell of Thornhaugh
Edward Russell; 1572–1627; 3rd Earl of Bedford, etc.	Francis Russell; 1593–1641; 4th Earl of Bedford, etc. 2nd Baron Russell of Thornhaugh
Duke of Bedford (6th creation) and Marquess of Tavistock, 1694; Baron Howland of Streatham, 1695
William Russell; 1616–1700; 1st Duke of Bedford, etc., 5th Earl of Bedford, etc. 3rd Baron Russell of Thornhaugh	Edward Russell; 1626–1665
Earl of Orford (1st creation), Viscount Barfleur and Baron of Shingay, in the County of Cambridge, 1697
Francis Russell; 1638–1679; Lord Russell	William Russell; 1639–1683; Lord Russell	Margaret Russell; 1656–1702	Edward Russell; 1652–1727; Earl of Orford, etc.	The Russell and Walpole families are not related, but have both held the Earldom of Orford.	Robert Walpole; 1650–1700
Attainted, 1683	Earldom of Orford (1st creation) and subsidiary titles extinct, 1727
Earl of Orford (2nd creation), Viscount Walpole and Baron Walpole of Houghton in the County of Norfolk, 1742	Baron Walpole of Wolterton in the County of Norfolk
Wriothesley Russell; 1680–1711; 2nd Duke of Bedford, etc., 5th Earl of Bedford, etc. 6th Baron Russell of Thornhaugh	Robert Walpole; 1676–1745; 1st Earl of Orford, etc.	Horatio Walpole; 1678–1757; 1st Baron Walpole of Wolterton
Baron Walpole of Walpole in the County of Norfolk	Earl of Orford (3rd creation), 1806
Wriothesley Russell; 1708–1732; 3rd Duke of Bedford, etc., 5th Earl of Bedford, etc. 7th Baron Russell of Thornhaugh	John Russell; 1710–1771; 4th Duke of Bedford, etc., 8th Earl of Bedford, etc. 6th Baron Russell of Thornhaugh	Robert Walpole; 1701–1751; 2nd Earl of Orford, etc., 1st Baron Walpole of Walpole	Horace Walpole "Horatio"; 1717–1797; 4th Earl of Orford, etc., 3rd Baron Walpole of Walpole	Maria Walpole; 1725–1801	Horatio Walpole "the Younger"; 1723–1809; 1st Earl of Orford, 4th Baron Walpole of Walpole, 2nd Baron Walpole of Wolterton
Earldom of Orford (2nd creation) and subsidiary titles extinct, 1797
Francis Russell; 1739–1767 styled Marquess of Tavistock	George Walpole; 1730–1791; 3rd Earl of Orford, etc., 2nd Baron Walpole of Walpole
Francis Russell; 1765–1802; 5th Duke of Bedford, etc., 9th Earl of Bedford, etc. 7th Baron Russell of Thornhaugh	John Russell; 1766–1839; 6th Duke of Bedford, etc., 10th Earl of Bedford, etc. 8th Baron Russell of Thornhaugh	William Russell; 1767–1840	Sophia Churchill d. 1797	Horatio Walpole; 1752–1822; 2nd Earl of Orford, 5th Baron Walpole of Walpole, 3rd Baron Walpole of Wolterton
Earl Russell and Viscount Amberley, 1861
Francis Russell; 1788–1861; 7th Duke of Bedford, etc., 11th Earl of Bedford, etc. 9th Baron Russell of Thornhaugh	George William Russell; 1790–1846	John Russell; 1792–1878; 1st Earl Russell, etc.	Horatio Walpole; 1783–1858; 3rd Earl of Orford, 6th Baron Walpole of Walpole, 4th Baron Walpole of Wolterton
Baron Ampthill, 1881
William Russell; 1809–1872; 8th Duke of Bedford, etc., 12th Earl of Bedford, etc. 10th Baron Russell of Thornhaugh	Francis Charles Hastings Russell; 1819–1891; 9th Duke of Bedford, etc., 13th Earl of Bedford, etc. 11th Baron Russell of Thornhaugh	Odo William Leopold Russell; 1829–1884; 1st Baron Ampthill	John Russell; 1842–1876 styled Viscount Amberley	Horatio Walpole; 1813–1894; 4th Earl of Orford, 7th Baron Walpole of Walpole, 5th Baron Walpole of Wolterton	Robert Walpole; 1854–1931; 5th Earl of Orford, 8th Baron Walpole of Walpole, 6th Baron Walpole of Wolterton
Earldom of Orford (3rd creation) extinct, 1931
George William Francis Sackville Russell; 1852–1893; 10th Duke of Bedford, etc., 14th Earl of Bedford, etc. 12th Baron Russell of Thornhaugh	Herbrand Arthur Russell; 1858–1940; 11th Duke of Bedford, etc., 15th Earl of Bedford, etc. 13th Baron Russell of Thornhaugh	John Francis Stanley Russell; 1865–1931; 2nd Earl Russell, etc.	Bertrand Arthur William Russell; 1872–1970; 3rd Earl Russell, etc.
Hastings William Sackville Russell; 1888–1953; 12th Duke of Bedford, etc., 16th Earl of Bedford, etc. 14th Baron Russell of Thornhaugh
John Ian Robert Russell; 1917–2002; 13th Duke of Bedford, etc., 17th Earl of Bedford, etc. 15th Baron Russell of Thornhaugh	John Conrad Russell; 1921–1987; 4th Earl Russell, etc.	Conrad Sebastian Robert Russell; 1937–2004; 5th Earl Russell, etc.
Henry Robin Ian Russell; 1940–2003; 14th Duke of Bedford, etc., 18th Earl of Bedford, etc. 16th Baron Russell of Thornhaugh
Baron Russell of Forest Hill, 2026 (for life)
Andrew Ian Henry Russell; 15th Duke of Bedford, etc., 19th Earl of Bedford, etc. 17th Baron Russell of Thornhaugh b. 1962	Nicholas Lyulph Russell; 1968–2014; 6th Earl Russell, etc.	John Francis Russell b. 1971; 7th Earl Russell, etc., Baron Russell of Forest Hill
There are no heirs to the Russell earldom.
Henry Robin Charles Russell b. 2005 styled Marquess of Tavistock
Heir to the Bedford dukedom and its subsidiary titles

== Arms ==
Coat of arms of Walpole, Earls of Orford (second and third creations)
Crest The bust of a man in profile couped proper, ducally crowned or, from the coronet flowing a long cap turned forwards gules tasselled and charged with a catherine wheel gold. Escutcheon Or, on a fess between. two chevrons sable, three crosses crosslet of the first. Supporters Dexter, an antelope; sinister, a stag argent, attired proper, each gorged with a collar chequy or and azure chained gold. Motto Fari quæ sentiat (To speak what he feels).

== See also ==
- Orford, Suffolk
- Houghton Hall
- Wolterton Hall
