= Robert Walpole (diplomat) =

British diplomat

Robert Walpole (3 May 1736 – 19 April 1810), from 1756 styled The Hon. Robert Walpole, was the fourth son of the 1st Baron Walpole, who was the younger brother of Prime Minister Robert Walpole, and his wife, Mary Magdalen Lombard. He served as an extra clerk of the Privy Council from 1749 until 1764, when he replaced Henry Fane as one of the Clerks in Ordinary. After serving as secretary of the British embassy in Paris (1768-1769) and as Minister Plenipotentiary (1769-1771), he was envoy extraordinary and minister plenipotentiary to Portugal from 1771 to 1800. One of his sons was Major-General George Walpole (1758–1835), under-secretary for foreign affairs in 1806.

Walpole was married twice: first, on 8 May 1780, to Diana Grosset (died 24 July 1784); and second, on 10 May 1785, to Sophia Stert (died 12 June 1829). He had issue by both wives; Robert Walpole the classical scholar was a son of the first marriage.

== Notes ==
Diplomatic posts
Preceded by William Lyttelton	Envoy to Portugal; 1771–1800 with William Fawkener 1786–?	Succeeded by John Hookham Frere
