= Frederick Walpole =

British naval commander and Conservative politician

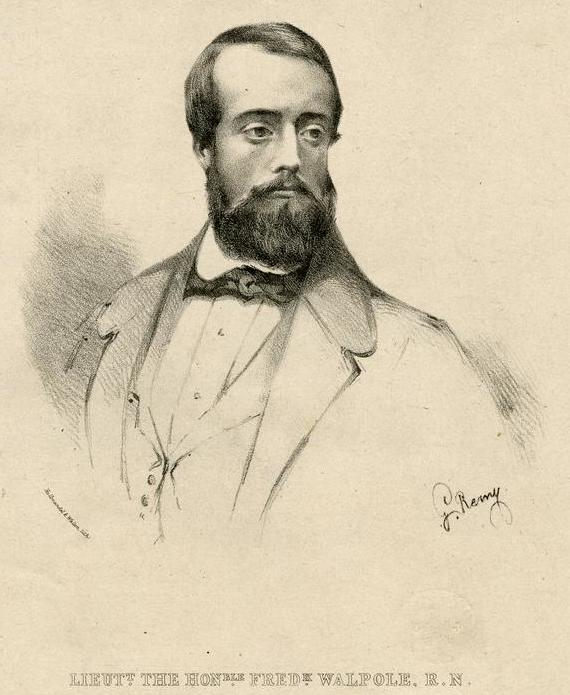
- Lieutenant Frederick Walpole
- Born: September 18, 1822
- Died: April 1, 1876 (aged 53)
- Spouse: Laura Sophia Frances Walpole (m. 1852–1876)
- Children: Including Robert Walpole, 5th Earl of Orford
- Relatives: Son of Horatio Walpole, 3rd Earl of Orford
- Military career
- Allegiance: United Kingdom
- Branch: Royal Navy
- Service years: 1843–1876
- Rank: Commander
- Known for: author of Four Years in the Pacific
- Other work: Member of Parliament for North Norfolk (1868–1876)

The Hon. Frederick Walpole (18 September 1822 – 1 April 1876) was a British naval commander, author and Conservative politician.

== Background ==
Walpole was a younger son of Horatio Walpole, 3rd Earl of Orford, and Mary Fawkener, daughter of William Augustus Fawkener.

== Naval and militia career ==
He served as an officer in the Royal Navy from 1843, attaining the rank of commander. On 18 March 1852 he was commissioned as a captain in the West Norfolk Militia, where his father was the Colonel of the regiment. Walpole was promoted to major on 17 May 1859, and commander in October 1864.

Walpole wrote several books about his naval experiences, particularly in the Pacific and Middle East, including Four Years in the Pacific (1849) and The Ansayrii, and the Assassins (1851).

== Political career ==
Walpole was returned to Parliament as one of two Conservative Party representatives for North Norfolk in 1868, a seat he held until his death eight years later.

== Family ==
Walpole married his second cousin, Laura Sophia Frances, daughter of Francis Walpole and Elizabeth Knight, in 1852. They had several children, including Robert Walpole, who succeeded as fifth Earl of Orford in 1894. Walpole died in April 1876, aged 53. His wife survived him by 25 years and died in January 1901.

Parliament of the United Kingdom
New constituency	Member of Parliament for Norfolk North; 1868–1876; With: Sir Edmund Lacon, Bt	Succeeded by Sir Edmund Lacon, Bt; James Duff
