= Baron Walpole =

Barony in the Peerage of Great Britain

Walpole coat of arms: Or, on a fesse between two chevrons sable three crosses crosslet of the field.

Baron Walpole of Walpole in the County of Norfolk is a title in the Peerage of Great Britain.

Since 1797 holders also hold the title of Baron Walpole of Wolterton. Past holders have also held the titles Baron Walpole of Houghton in the County of Norfolk, Viscount Walpole and Earl of Orford (second creation; 1742 to 1797), and Earl of Orford (third creation; 1806 to 1931). One holder held the title of Baron Clinton from 1781 to 1791.

== History ==
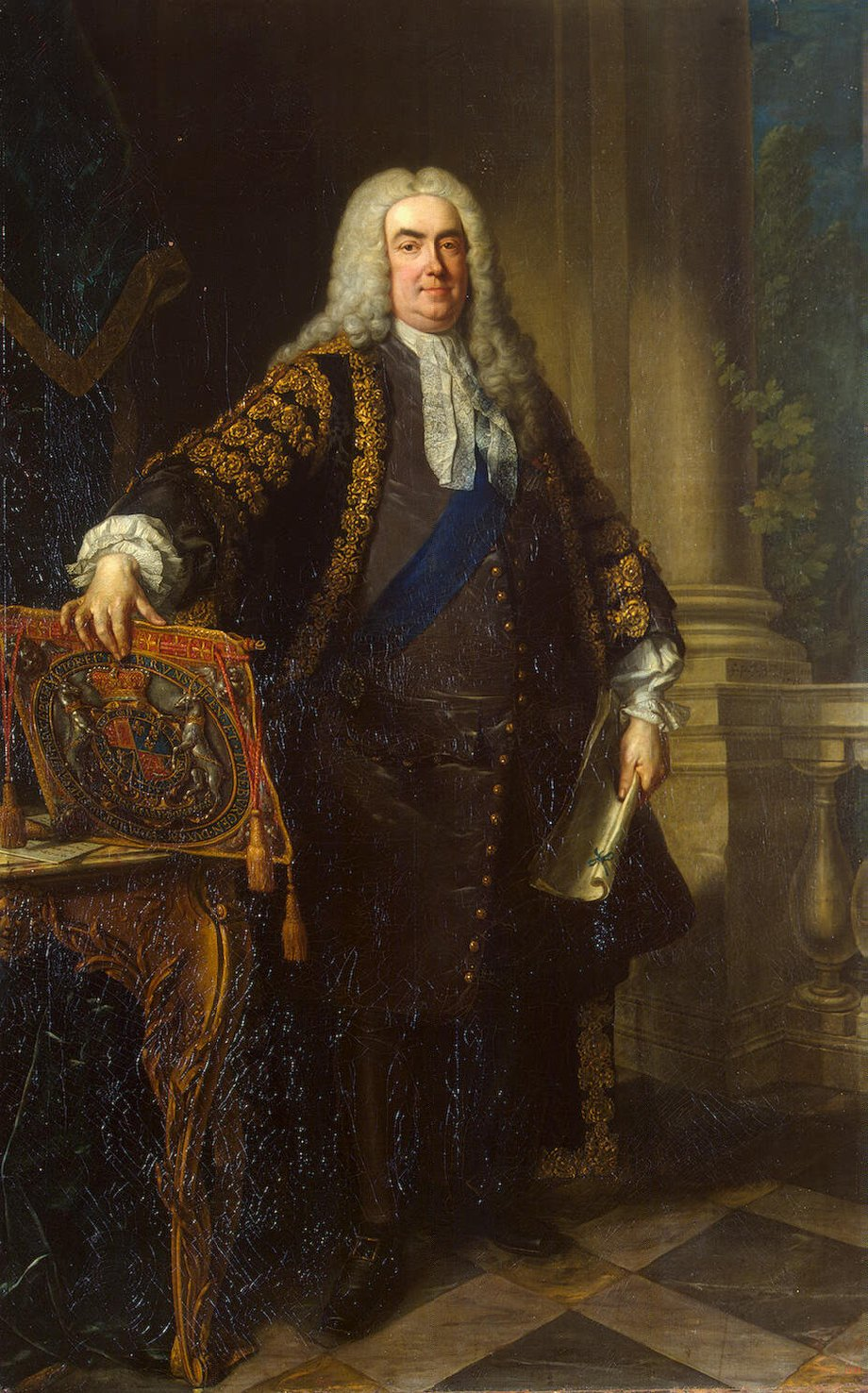
Robert Walpole, 1st Earl of Orford

=== Grants ===
The title of Baron Walpole of Walpole in the County of Norfolk was created in the Peerage of Great Britain in 1723 for Robert Walpole, in honour of and during the lifetime of his father Sir Robert Walpole, the de facto first Prime Minister of Great Britain, with special remainder, failing male issue, to his brothers Edward and Horace, in default of this to the heirs male of his father, and in default of this to the heirs male of his grandfather Sir Thomas Walpole.

On Sir Robert's retirement from the House of Commons in 1742, he received the titles Baron Walpole of Houghton in the County of Norfolk, Viscount Walpole and Earl of Orford, with the standard remainder. (Note: The standard remainder in Peerages of the United Kingdom and of England is to the heirs male of the grantee's body.)

The title of Baron Walpole of Wolterton in the County of Norfolk was created in the Peerage of Great Britain in 1756 for Horatio Walpole, envoy to Paris and later The Hague, and younger brother of Sir Robert.

=== Early holders ===
When Sir Robert, the 1st Earl of Orford, died in 1745, he was succeeded by his eldest son, the aforementioned Robert, Lord Walpole of Walpole, who thus became the 2nd Earl of Orford. He had married Devonshire heiress Margaret Rolle in 1724. In 1751, she, by survival, became one of the co-heirs to the ancient Clinton barony, which was in abeyance. That abeyance was terminated in her favour in 1760, and she became the 15th Baroness Clinton.

The 2nd Earl of Orford was succeeded by his eldest son, the 3rd Earl. He notably served as Lord Lieutenant of Norfolk from 1757 to 1797. In 1781 he also succeeded his mother as 16th Baron Clinton. Lord Orford never married and on his death the barony of Clinton became dormant (see the Baron Clinton article for later history of this peerage), while the other titles were inherited by his uncle, the 4th Earl, at birth known as Horace Walpole, who was a politician and early expounder of the Neo-Gothic in architecture and the Gothic novel. He never married either and so on his death in 1797, three of his titles of different ranks became extinct, while he was succeeded as Baron Walpole of Walpole according to the special remainder by his cousin Horatio Walpole (known as the younger), who had already inherited his own father's title, Baron Walpole of Wolterton.

=== Horatio Walpole the Younger ===
As said, Horatio Walpole (the Younger) succeeded his father as Baron Walpole of Wolterton in 1757 and eventually as Baron Walpole of Walpole in 1797. He had earlier represented King's Lynn in Parliament. In favour with those in power, in 1806 the earldom of Orford was recreated for him.

=== Later holders ===
Horatio the younger's son sat as Member of Parliament for Wigan and King's Lynn before coming into his earldom. His grandson, the 4th Earl, briefly represented Wigan in the House of Commons.

The baronies of Walpole of Walpole and Walpole of Wolterton were inherited by the late 5th Earl's distant cousin, who was a male-line descendant of the Hon. Thomas Walpole, second son of the 1st Baron Walpole of Wolterton. As of 2021, the two remaining peerages are held by the 9th/7th Baron's grandson, the 11th/9th Baron Walpole. The 10/8th Baron was one of the ninety hereditary peers who remained in the House of Lords after the passing of the House of Lords Act of 1999, and sat as a cross-bencher, until his retirement on 13 June 2017.

The family seat is Mannington Hall, near Itteringham, Norfolk.

== Barons Walpole of Walpole (1723) ==
- Robert Walpole, 1st Baron Walpole of Walpole (1701–1751) (succeeded as 2nd Earl of Orford in 1745)

== Earls of Orford, Viscounts Walpole, Barons Walpole of Houghton (1742) ==
- Robert Walpole, 1st Earl of Orford, 1st Viscount Walpole, 1st Baron Walpole of Houghton (1676–1745)
- Robert Walpole, 2nd Earl of Orford, 2nd Viscount Walpole, 2nd Baron Walpole of Houghton, 1st Baron Walpole of Walpole (1701–1751)
- George Walpole, 3rd Earl of Orford, 3rd Viscount Walpole, 3rd Baron Walpole of Houghton, 2nd Baron Walpole of Walpole (1730–1791) (succeeded as 16th Baron Clinton in 1781)
- Horace Walpole, 4th Earl of Orford, 4th Viscount Walpole, 4th Baron Walpole of Houghton, 3rd Baron Walpole of Walpole (1717–1797)

== Barons Walpole of Wolterton (1756) ==
- Horatio Walpole, 1st Baron Walpole of Wolterton (1678–1757)
- Horatio Walpole, 2nd Baron Walpole of Wolterton (1723–1809) (succeeded as 4th Baron Walpole of Walpole in 1797 and created Earl of Orford in 1806)

=== Earls of Orford (1806), Barons Walpole of Walpole and Barons Walpole of Wolterton ===
- Horatio Walpole, 1st Earl of Orford, 4th Baron Walpole of Walpole, 2nd Baron Walpole of Wolterton (1723–1809)
- Horatio Walpole, 2nd Earl of Orford, 5th Baron Walpole of Walpole, 3rd Baron Walpole of Wolterton (1752–1822)
- Horatio Walpole, 3rd Earl of Orford, 6th Baron Walpole of Walpole, 4th Baron Walpole of Wolterton (1783–1858)
- Horatio William Walpole, 4th Earl of Orford, 7th Baron Walpole of Walpole, 5th Baron Walpole of Wolterton (1813–1894)
- Robert Horace Walpole, 5th Earl of Orford, 8th Baron Walpole of Walpole, 6th Baron Walpole of Wolterton (1854–1931)

== Barons Walpole of Walpole and Barons Walpole of Wolterton following reversion ==
- Robert Henry Montgomerie Walpole, 9th Baron Walpole of Walpole, 7th Baron Walpole of Wolterton (1913–1989)
- Robert Horatio Walpole, 10th Baron Walpole of Walpole, 8th Baron Walpole of Wolterton (1938–2021)
- Jonathan Robert Hugh Walpole, 11th Baron Walpole of Walpole, 9th Baron Walpole of Wolterton (b. 1967)

The heir presumptive is the present holder's brother, Hon. Benedict Thomas Orford Walpole (b. 1969).
The heir presumptive's heir apparent is his elder son, Thomas Charles Walpole (b. 2003).

== Title succession chart ==
Title succession chart

Title succession chart, Barons Walpole (of Walpole, of Houghton, and of Wolterton), Viscounts Walpole, and Earls of Orford (second and third creations).

Col. Robert Walpole; 1650–1700
Earl of Orford (1742 creation); Viscount Walpole
Baron Walpole of Houghton	Baron Walpole of Wolterton
Edward Walpole; 1674–?	Burwell Walpole; 1675–?	Robert Walpole; 1st Earl of Orford; 1st Baron Walpole of Houghton; 1676–1745; Prime Minister of Great Britain; 1721–1742	John Walpole; 1677–?	Horatio Walpole; 1st Baron Walpole of Wolterton; 1678–1757
Baron Walpole of Walpole	Earl of Orford (1806 creation)
Robert Walpole; 2nd Earl of Orford; 1st Baron Walpole of Walpole; 2nd Baron Walpole of Houghton; 1701–1751	Hon. Sir Edward Walpole; 1706–1784	Horace Walpole; 4th Earl of Orford; 3rd Baron Walpole of Walpole; 4th Baron Walpole of Houghton; 1717–1797	Horatio Walpole; 1st Earl of Orford; 4th Baron Walpole of Walpole; 2nd Baron Walpole of Wolterton; 1723–1809	Hon. Thomas Walpole; 1727–1803
Earldom, viscountcy and barony Walpole of Houghton extinct
George Walpole; 3rd Earl of Orford; 2nd Baron Walpole of Walpole; 3rd Baron Walpole of Houghton; 16th Baron Clinton; 1730–1791	Edward Walpole; 1737–1771	Horatio Walpole; 2nd Earl of Orford; 5th Baron Walpole of Walpole; 3rd Baron Walpole of Wolterton; 1752–1822	Maj.Gen. Hon. George Walpole; 1758–1835	Thomas Walpole; 1755–1840
Horatio Walpole; 3rd Earl of Orford; 6th Baron Walpole of Walpole; 4th Baron Walpole of Wolterton; 1783–1858	Frederick Walpole; 1786–?	John Walpole; 1787–1859	Rev. Thomas Walpole; 1805–1881
Horatio Walpole; 4th Earl of Orford; 7th Baron Walpole of Walpole; 5th Baron Walpole of Wolterton; 1813–1894	Hon. Henry Walpole; 1818–1876	Cdr. Hon. Frederick Walpole; 1822–1876	Henry Vade-Walpole; 1837–1913
Robert Walpole; 5th Earl of Orford; 8th Baron Walpole of Walpole; 6th Baron Walpole of Wolterton; 1854–1931	Clare Walpole; 1858–1906	Thomas Vade-Walpole; 1879–1915	Horatio Spencer Walpole; 1881–1918
Earldom extinct
Baronies inherited from the 5th Earl of Orford
Horatio Walpole; 1891–1893	Robert Walpole; 9th Baron Walpole of Walpole; 7th Baron Walpole of Wolterton; 1913–1989
Robert Walpole; 10th Baron Walpole of Walpole; 8th Baron Walpole of Wolterton; 1938–2021
Jonathan Walpole; 11th Baron Walpole of Walpole; 9th Baron Walpole of Wolterton born 1967	Hon. Benedict Walpole born 1969
Thomas Walpole born 2003

== See also ==
- Earl of Orford
- Wolterton Hall
- Spencer Horatio Walpole
- Spencer Walpole
- Lady Walpole (disambiguation)

== Notes and references ==
Notes
