= Edward Walpole (Jesuit) =

English Roman Catholic convert, Jesuit missioner and preacher

Edward Walpole (1560–1637), alias Rich, was an English Roman Catholic convert, who became known as a Jesuit missioner and preacher. He passed up substantial estates that subsequently became part of the fortune of the Walpole political family.

== Life ==
He was son and heir of John Walpole of Houghton, Norfolk, by Catherine Calibut of Coxford in the same county, and was born on 28 January 1560. He matriculated as a fellow commoner at St Peter's College, Cambridge, in May 1576, the year after his cousin Henry Walpole had entered at the same college as a pensioner.

He showed sympathy for Catholicism, and incurred the displeasure of his parents: in 1585 he was turned out of his home at Houghton, and adopted the name of Poor to indicate his want of means. Another cousin, William Walpole, offered him an asylum at North Tuddenham in Norfolk. He reconciled William to his wife, from whom he had been for estranged, and when in October 1587 William died, he left most of his large property to Edward, subject to the life interest of his widow. John Gerard was then active in Norfolk among the recusant gentry, and one of his first converts was Edward Walpole. At the same time Gerard induced him to sell the reversion of the manor of Tuddenham for a thousand marks.

In April 1588 Walpole's father died, leaving as much as possible to his second son, Calibut, and not even naming his elder son Edward in his will. Five months later Robert Dudley, 1st Earl of Leicester, died. The earl had a life interest in the estates of Amy Robsart, contiguous to those of the Walpoles, and these now descended to Edward Walpole as heir-at-law to Sir John Robsart, Amy's father. Edward Walpole, however, surrendered by deed all claim and title on the Robsart and the Houghton estates to his brother Calibut. He made his way to the continent, to become a Jesuit. He was in Flanders in 1590, and was admitted to the English College, Rome on 23 October 1590, where he remained two years studying theology. He was ordained priest on Ascension Day 1592, and shortly afterwards was admitted into the Society of Jesus. He was summoned to Tournai to go through his period of probation. The news of his receiving priest's orders at Rome reached England, and in 1597 he was outlawed ‘for a supposed treason done at Rome.’

In 1598 Walpole returned to England, and began to exercise his functions as a Roman priest and Jesuit missioner, though hunted about from place to place. After his return to England he passed under the name of Rich as an alias. In 1605 he was granted a pardon, which would have put him in possession of the family estates on the death of his mother. She survived till 1612; but he renewed his deed of surrender to his brother, and the estates accordingly descended through him to Sir Robert Walpole and the Earls of Orford. He died in London on 3 November 1637, in his seventy-eighth year.

== Works ==
He translated into English a work of the Christian humanist Louis Richeome as The Pilgrime of Loreto (1629).

== Notes ==
Attribution

- This article incorporates text from a publication now in the public domain: "Walpole, Edward". Dictionary of National Biography. London: Smith, Elder & Co. 1885–1900.
