= Horatio Walpole, 1st Baron Walpole =

British diplomat and politician

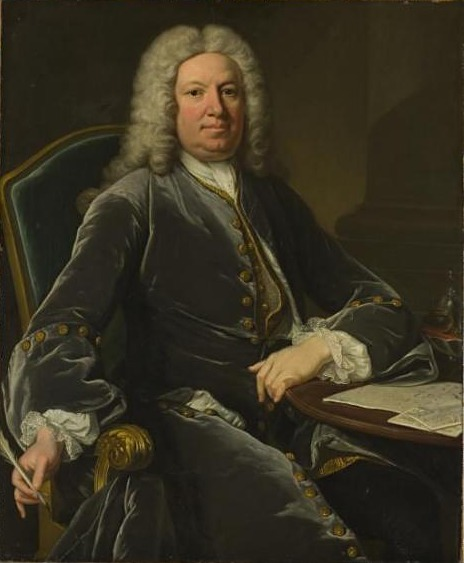
Horatio Walpole, 1st Baron Walpole by Jean-Baptiste van Loo

Horatio Walpole, 1st Baron Walpole, PC (8 December 1678 – 5 February 1757) was a British diplomat and politician who served as the British ambassador to France from 1724 to 1730. He was the son of Robert Walpole and the younger brother of Robert Walpole, the first Prime Minister of Great Britain.

== Family ==
The Walpoles owned land in Norfolk in the 12th century and took their name from Walpole, a village in the county. An early member of the family was Ralph de Walpole, bishop of Norwich from 1288 to 1299, and bishop of Ely from 1299 until his death on 20 March 1302. Among its later members were three brothers, Edward (1560–1637), Richard (1564–1607) and Michael (1570–1624), all members of the Society of Jesus. Another Jesuit in the family was Henry Walpole (1558–1595), who wrote An Epitaph of the life and death of the most famous clerk and virtuous priest Edmund Campion and was tortured and put to death on 17 April 1595.

== Political career ==
Born at Houghton and educated at Eton and King's College, Cambridge, Horatio Walpole became a fellow of King's. He entered Parliament in 1702, remaining a member for fifty-four years. In 1715, when his brother, Sir Robert, became first lord of the treasury, he was made Secretary to the Treasury, and in 1716, having already had some experience of the kind, he went on a diplomatic mission to The Hague. He left office with his brother in 1717, but he was soon in harness again, becoming secretary to the lord-lieutenant of Ireland in 1720 and Secretary to the Treasury a second time in 1721.

In 1722 he was again at The Hague, and in 1723 he went to Paris, where in the following year he was appointed envoy extraordinary and minister plenipotentiary. He got on intimate terms with Fleury and seconded his brother in his efforts to maintain friendly relations with France; he represented Great Britain at the congress of Soissons and helped to conclude the treaty of Seville (November 1729). He left Paris in 1730 and in 1734 went to represent his country at The Hague, where he remained until 1740, using all his influence in the cause of European peace. He was nonetheless able to stay involved in the affairs of the capital. He served, for example, in 1739, as a founding governor for London's most fashionable charity of the time, the Foundling Hospital.

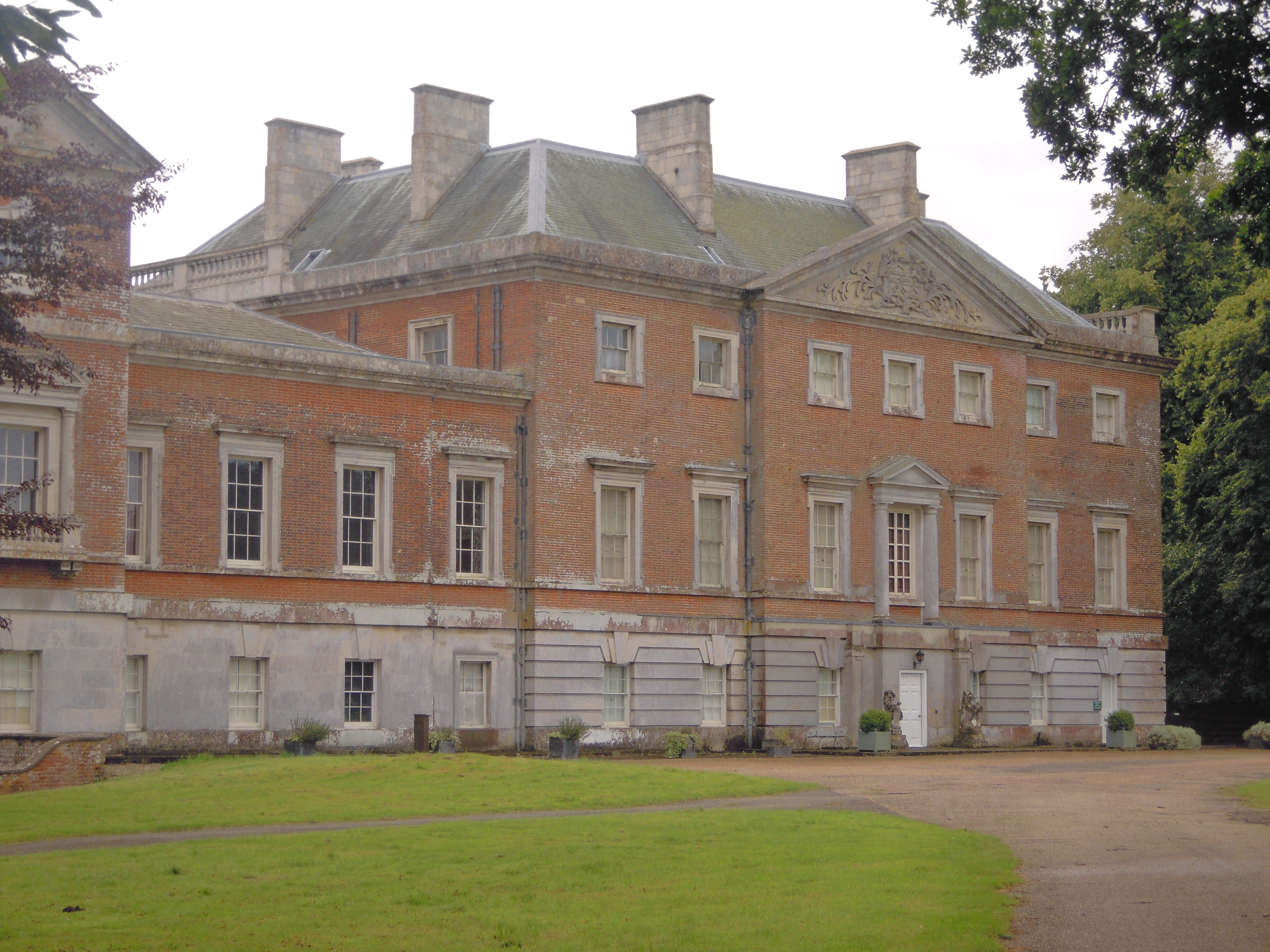
Wolterton Hall, England

After the fall of Sir Robert Walpole in 1742, Horatio defended his conduct in the House of Commons of Great Britain and also in a pamphlet, "The Interest of Great Britain steadily pursued". Later he wrote an "Apology", dealing with his own conduct from 1715 to 1739, and an "Answer to the latter part of Lord Bolingbroke's letters on the study of history" (printed 1763).

In 1724 he engaged Thomas Ripley to design him a new house at Wolterton in Norfolk to replace one that had burnt down. The house called Wolterton Hall was completed in 1742.

In 1756 he was created Baron Walpole, of Wolterton and he died 5 February 1757 at his house in Whitehall.

== Personal life ==
He married Mary Magdalen Lombard on 21 July 1720. They had nine children:

- Horatio Walpole, 2nd Baron Walpole (1723–1809), created Earl of Orford in 1806
- The Hon. Mary Walpole (born 25 February 1726), who married Maurice Suckling.
- The Hon. Thomas Walpole (6 October 1727 – March 1803), who married Elizabeth Vanneck (died 9 June 1760) on 14 November 1753, and had issue.
- The Hon. Richard Walpole (5 December 1728 – 18 August 1798), who married Margaret Vanneck (before 1742 – 9 May 1818) on 22 November 1758, and had issue.
- Susan Walpole (3 May 1730 – 29 April 1732)
- The Hon. Henrietta Louisa Walpole (28 November 1731 – June 1824)
- The Hon. Anne Walpole (12 July 1733 – 25 November 1797)
- Caroline Walpole (22 November 1734 – 11 January 1737)
- The Hon. Robert Walpole (1736–1810)

Diplomatic posts
Preceded by Sir Luke Schaub	British Ambassador to France; 1724–1730	Succeeded by The Earl Waldegrave
Preceded by William Finch	Ambassador to the United Provinces; 1734–1739	Succeeded by Robert Trevor
Political offices
Preceded by John Taylor	Secretary to the Treasury (junior); 1715–1717	Succeeded by Charles Stanhope
Preceded by Edward Webster	Chief Secretary for Ireland; 1720–1721	Succeeded by Edward Hopkins
Preceded by Charles Stanhope	Secretary to the Treasury (junior); 1721–1730	Succeeded by Edward Walpole
Vacant Title last held by The Earl of Lincoln	Cofferer of the Household; 1730–1741	Succeeded by Thomas Winnington
Preceded by The Lord Onslow	Teller of the Exchequer; 1741–1757	Succeeded by The Earl Waldegrave
Parliament of Great Britain
Preceded by Russell Robartes; Francis Robartes	Member of Parliament for Lostwithiel; 1710; With: Francis Robartes	Succeeded by John Hill; Hugh Fortescue
Preceded by William Feilding; Horatio Walpole, senior	Member of Parliament for Castle Rising; 1713–1715; With: William Feilding	Succeeded by William Feilding; Charles Churchill
Preceded by Sir Peter King; Lawrence Carter	Member of Parliament for Bere Alston; 1715–1717; With: Lawrence Carter	Succeeded by Edward Carteret; Lawrence Carter
Preceded by Sir James Bateman; John Smith	Member of Parliament for East Looe; 1718–1722; With: John Smith	Succeeded by William Lowndes; John Smith
Preceded by George England; Horatio Townshend	Member of Parliament for Great Yarmouth; 1722–1734; With: Hon. Charles Townshend 1722–1723; William Townshend 1723–1734	Succeeded by (Sir) Edward Walpole; William Townshend
Preceded by Waller Bacon; Robert Brightiffe	Member of Parliament for Norwich; 1734–1756; With: Waller Bacon 1734–1735; Thomas Vere 1735–1747; Lord Hobart 1747–1756	Succeeded by Edward Bacon; Lord Hobart
Peerage of Great Britain
New creation	Baron Walpole of Wolterton; 1756–1757	Succeeded by Horatio Walpole
