= Horatio Walpole, 3rd Earl of Orford =

British politician (1783–1858)

The Right Honourable Horatio Walpole DL
- Earl of Orford
- Coat of arms
- Tenure: 1822–1858
- Predecessor: Horatio Walpole, 2nd Earl of Orford
- Successor: Horatio Walpole, 4th Earl of Orford
- Born: 14 June 1783
- Died: 29 December 1858 (aged 75)
- Spouse: Mary Wilhelmina Augustine Henrietta Fawkener (m. 1812)
- Issue: Horatio-William Walpole, 4th Earl of Orford; Hon. Henry Walpole; Hon. Frederick Walpole; Lady Rachel-Katherine Walpole; Lady Dorothy-Fanny Walpole

Horatio Walpole, 3rd Earl of Orford, DL (14 June 1783 – 29 December 1858), styled Lord Walpole between 1809 and 1822, was a British peer and politician.

== Background ==
He was the eldest son of Horatio Walpole, 2nd Earl of Orford, by his wife Sophia Churchill, a daughter of Charles Churchill by his wife Lady Maria Walpole, a daughter of Robert Walpole, 1st Earl of Orford, by his mistress, later his 2nd wife, Maria Skerett. The Countess of Orford was thus granddaughter of Sir Robert Walpole, and brought his line of descent into these related earls. His grandfather, the 1st Baron Walpole of Wolterton, was Sir Robert's brother.

== Political career ==
Orford succeeded his father as Member of Parliament for King's Lynn in 1809, and the held the seat until 1822. The latter year he also succeeded his father in the earldom and entered the House of Lords. He also followed his father as Colonel of the disembodied West Norfolk Militia, being appointed on 26 June 1822.

== Family ==
Lord Orford married Mary Wilhelmina Augustine, daughter of William Augustus Fawkener, in 1812. They had several children, including:

- Horatio Walpole, 4th Earl of Orford
- Henry Walpole
- William Walpole
- the Hon. Frederick Walpole, father of Robert Walpole, 5th Earl of Orford
- Lady Rachel Walpole, who married John Savile, 4th Earl of Mexborough
- Lady Dorothy Walpole, Her husband was Reginald Henry Nevill (d. 1878), a grandson of the 1st Earl of Abergavenny.

Orford died in December 1858, aged 75, and was succeeded in the earldom by his eldest son, Horatio. Lady Orford died in February 1860.

== Arms ==
Coat of arms of Horatio Walpole, 3rd Earl of Orford
Crest The bust of a man in profile couped proper, ducally crowned or, from the coronet flowing a long cap turned forwards gules tasselled and charged with a catherine wheel gold. Escutcheon Or, on a fess between. two chevrons sable, three crosses crosslet of the first. Supporters Dexter, an antelope; sinister, a stag argent, attired proper, each gorged with a collar chequy or and azure chained gold. Motto Fari quæ sentiat (To speak what he feels).

Parliament of the United Kingdom
Preceded by Lord Walpole; Sir Martin ffolkes, Bt	Member of Parliament for King's Lynn; 1809–1822; With: Sir Martin ffolkes, Bt 1809–1821; The Marquess of Titchfield 1822	Succeeded by The Marquess of Titchfield; Hon. John Walpole
Peerage of the United Kingdom
Preceded by Horatio Walpole	Earl of Orford; 3rd creation 1822–1858	Succeeded by Horatio Walpole
Peerage of Great Britain
Preceded by Horatio Walpole	Baron Walpole of Walpole; 1822–1858	Succeeded by Horatio Walpole
Preceded by Horatio Walpole	Baron Walpole of Wolterton; 1822–1858	Succeeded by Horatio Walpole
