= Horatio Walpole, 4th Earl of Orford (third creation) =

British peer and Conservative politician

Horatio William Walpole
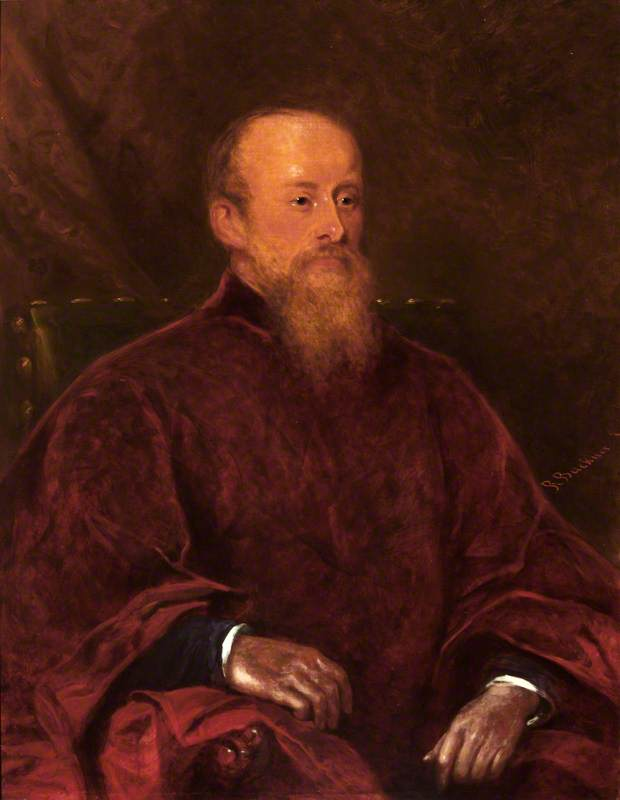

Member of the British Parliament for Norfolk East
- In office 1835–1837

4th Earl of Orford
- In office 1858–1894

Personal details
- Born: 18 April 1813
- Died: 7 December 1894 (aged 81)
- Spouse: Harriet Bettina Frances Pellew
- Education: Trinity College, Cambridge

Horatio William Walpole, 4th Earl of Orford (18 April 1813 – 7 December 1894), styled Lord Walpole between 1822 and 1858, was a British peer and Conservative politician.

== Background ==
Orford was the son of Horatio Walpole, 3rd Earl of Orford, and Mary, daughter of William Augustus Fawkener.

== Political career ==
In 1835, at the age of 21, Orford was returned to Parliament as one of two representatives for Norfolk East, a seat he held until 1837. In 1858 he succeeded his father in the earldom and took his seat in the House of Lords. He referred to the famed advocate of women's rights Mary Wollstonecraft as "a hyena in petticoats".

== Family ==
Lord Orford married Harriet Bettina Frances, daughter of Admiral the Hon. Sir Fleetwood Pellew, in 1841. He "treated her with grotesquely violent cruelty" and in 1846 she went to live in Florence. They had two daughters.

- Lady Dorothy Elizabeth Mary Walpole (1842-1921), married Don Ernesto del Balzo, 7. Duca di Caprigliano, Duca del Balzo
- Lady Maude Mary Walpole (b.9 Aug 1844), married Count Salvatore Grifeo and Grevana, Prince Palagonia

She died in November 1886. Lord Orford survived her by eight years and died in December 1894, aged 81. He was succeeded in the earldom by his nephew, Robert Horace Walpole.

Lord Orford had an illegitimate child, Horatio Walpole, by the Lady Susan, wife of the 5th Duke of Newcastle and daughter of Alexander Douglas-Hamilton, 10th Duke of Hamilton.

== Arms ==
Coat of arms of Horatio Walpole, 4th Earl of Orford
Crest The bust of a man in profile couped proper, ducally crowned or, from the coronet flowing a long cap turned forwards gules tasselled and charged with a catherine wheel gold. Escutcheon Or, on a fess between. two chevrons sable, three crosses crosslet of the first. Supporters Dexter, an antelope; sinister, a stag argent, attired proper, each gorged with a collar chequy or and azure chained gold. Motto Fari quæ sentiat (To speak what he feels).

Parliament of the United Kingdom
Preceded by William Windham; Hon. George Keppel	Member of Parliament for Norfolk East; 1835–1837; With: Edmond Wodehouse	Succeeded by Edmond Wodehouse; Henry Negus Burroughes
Peerage of the United Kingdom
Preceded by Horatio Walpole	Earl of Orford; 3rd creation 1858–1895	Succeeded by Robert Walpole
Peerage of Great Britain
Preceded by Horatio Walpole	Baron Walpole of Walpole; 1858–1895	Succeeded by Robert Walpole
Preceded by Horatio Walpole	Baron Walpole of Wolterton; 1858–1895	Succeeded by Robert Walpole
