= Walpole (disambiguation) =

Walpole most commonly refers to Robert Walpole, the first prime minister of Great Britain, or to Horace Walpole, the English writer and politician.

Walpole may also refer to:

== People ==
- Walpole (surname)
- Walpole family, a distinguished English aristocratic family
- Baron Walpole, a title in the Peerage of Great Britain
- Walpole G. Colerick (1845–1911), American politician
- Walpole Vidal (1853–1914), century British footballer

== Places ==
=== Australia ===
- Walpole, Western Australia, a town in the Shire of Manjimup
- North Walpole, Western Australia, a locality of the Shire of Manjimup, Western Australia
- Walpole River, Western Australia
- Walpole Wilderness Area, Western Australia

=== Canada ===
- Rural Municipality of Walpole No. 92, Saskatchewan
- Walpole Island First Nation, Ontario
- Walpole Island, Six Mile Lake, Georgian Bay, Ontario

=== England ===
- Walpole, Norfolk, a civil parish that includes the villages of Walpole St Andrew and Walpole St Peter
- Walpole, Suffolk
- Walpole Cross Keys, Norfolk
- Walpole Highway, Norfolk
- Walpole Park, London Borough of Ealing
- Walpole (ward), Ealing

=== France ===
- Walpole Island (New Caledonia)

=== United States ===
- Walpole, Maine, a village
- Walpole, Massachusetts, a town
  - Walpole (CDP), Massachusetts, the original village within the town
  - Massachusetts Correctional Institution – Cedar Junction, formerly known as Walpole
- Walpole, New Hampshire, a town
  - Walpole (CDP), New Hampshire, the central village in the town

== Schools in the United States ==
- Walpole Academy, Walpole, New Hampshire, a former school now on the National Register of Historic Places
- Walpole High School, Walpole, Massachusetts

== Transportation ==
- Walpole (EIC ship), five British East India Company sailing ships
- Walpole Street, Chelsea, London
- Walpole railway station (England), a former station in Walpole, Norfolk, England
- Walpole station (MBTA), Walpole, Massachusetts, United States

== Other uses ==
- HMS Walpole, a Royal Navy destroyer which served in the Second World War
- Walpole (trade association), the official body for the UK's luxury goods sector
- Turbonilla walpole, a sea snail of family Pyramidellidae

== See also ==
- Walpole House, Chiswick, London, a Grade I listed building
- Walpole Park, Ealing, London, a Grade II municipal park
