= Walpole (surname) =

Walpole is an English toponymic surname from either Walpole, Norfolk or Walpole, Suffolk.

== Notable people ==
- Aaron Walpole (born 1979), Canadian actor
- Alice Walpole (born 1963), British ambassador
- Brian Walpole, Concorde pilot
- Doug Walpole (1942–2020), Australian politician
- Edward Walpole (disambiguation), several people
- Frederick Walpole (1822–1876), British naval officer and politician
- Galfridus Walpole (1683–1726), British naval officer and politician
- Gary Walpole (born 1963), Australian rules footballer
- George Walpole (disambiguation)
- Henry Walpole (1558–1595), English Jesuit martyr and Roman Catholic saint
- Horace Walpole (1717–1797), writer
- Horatio Walpole (disambiguation), several people
- Hugh Walpole (1884–1941), novelist
- John Walpole (1797–1864), English soldier and diplomat
- Michael Walpole (1570–1614), English Jesuit and controversialist
- Ralph Walpole (died 1302), medieval Bishop of Norwich and Bishop of Ely
- Richard Walpole (1728–1798), British politician
- Robert Walpole (disambiguation), several people
- Spencer Horatio Walpole (1806–1898), British politician
- Spencer Walpole (1839–1907), English historian and civil servant
- Stanley Walpole (1886–1968), Australian actor
- Thomas Walpole (1727–1803), British politician and banker

== See also ==
- Baron Walpole, a title in the Peerage of Great Britain
- Walpole family, a famous English aristocratic family
- Walpole (disambiguation)
