= Geology of New Caledonia =

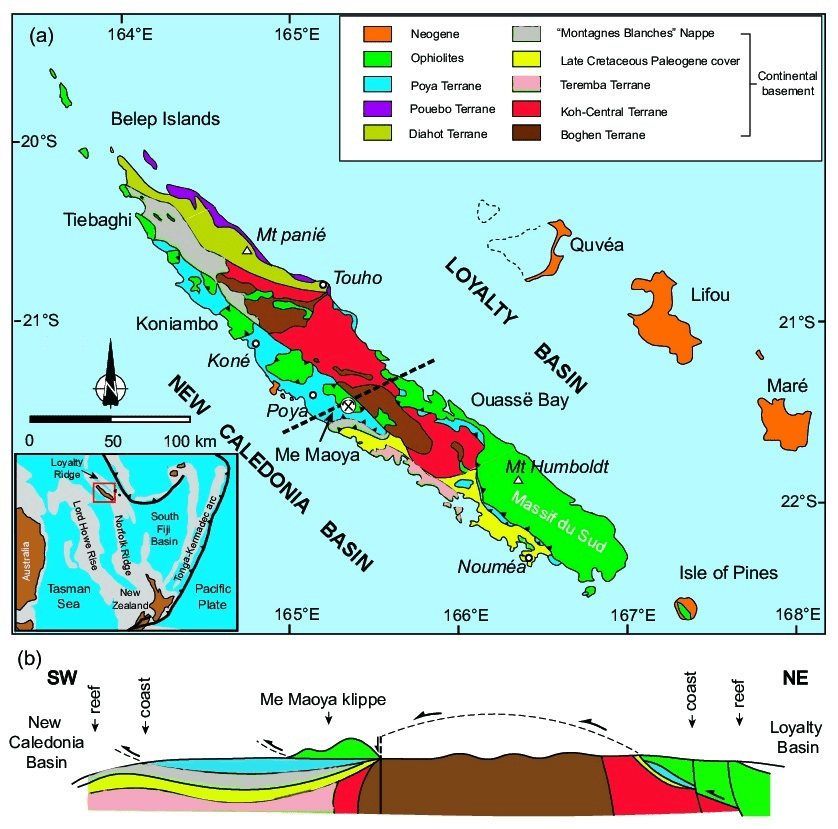
Fig.1 A simplified geological map of New Caledonia with a cross-section, modified by Xu and Liu (2019)

The geology of New Caledonia includes all major rock types (igneous, sedimentary, and metamorphic), which here range in age from ~290 million years old (Ma) to recent. Their formation is driven by alternate plate collisions and rifting. The mantle-derived Eocene Peridotite Nappe is the most significant and widespread unit (labelled as "Ophiolites" and coloured in bright green in Fig. 1). The igneous unit consists of ore-rich ultramafic rocks thrust onto the main island. Mining of valuable metals from this unit has been an economical pillar of New Caledonia for more than a century.

New Caledonia is located on the Indo-Australian Plate and the largely submerged continent of Zealandia. After New Zealand, it is the second-largest subaerial landmass, and the northernmost part of this continent. As shown on the map, the landmass is elongated in a NW-SE orientation, which is similar to the distribution patterns of most of the geological units. Thrusting, exhumation and folding of some of the units have contributed to the rugged topography of the elongated main island, with Mont Panié and Mount Humboldt being the highest points (over 1,600 m).

== Overview of the regional geology ==
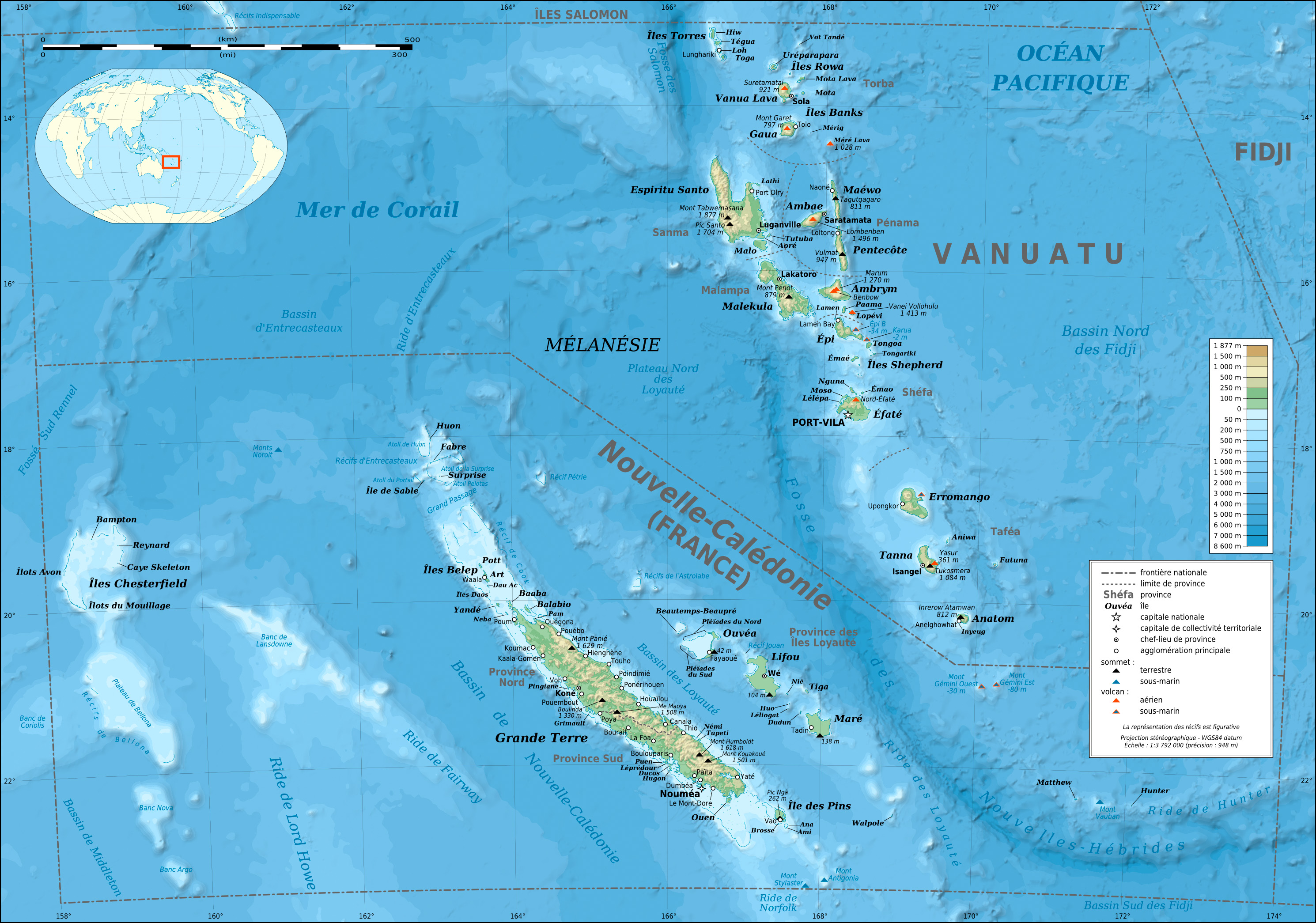
Fig. 2 Topographic map of New Caledonia and the neighboring Vanuatu.

The geology of the Collectivity (autonomous region) is divided into two relatively separated parts: the larger Grande Terre in the West and the Loyalty Islands in the East. The smaller islands are younger and are believed to have emerged as a volcanic island arc in the Eocene, but are currently covered by coral reefs and carbonate rocks. For the main island of Grande Terre, there are diverse geological units. Before illustrating each of them and their implications, here is the table to summarize the units in a reversed chronological order, as the older rocks usually occupy deeper locations:

Brief summary of the rock units on Grande Terre
Geological unit	Rock type	Formation process/ environment	Time of emplacement	Ref.
Nepoui series, Gwa N'doro Formation	Clastic sedimentary	Lagoonal to fluvial deposition	Since Neogene	
Granitoids	Felsic to intermediate intrusive igneous	Intrusive volcanism to form plutons and dykes	Eocene to Oligocene	
Pouebo Terrane, Diahot Terrane	Foliated metamorphic	Subduction zone metamorphism	Eocene	
Poya Terrane, Peridotite Nappe	Mafic to ultramafic intrusive and extrusive igneous	Volcanism in the ocean, then obducted onto the island during collision between tectonic plates	Eocene	
Montagnes Blanches Nappe, Bourail Flysch, Koné Terrane, Koumac Terrane, Formation à charbon	Sedimentary	Terrestrial towards marine, and back to lacustrine sedimentation	Late Cretaceous to Eocene	
Boghen Terrane	Foliated metamorphic	Subduction zone metamorphism	Jurassic to Cretaceous	
Teremba Terrane, Central Terrane	Mostly sedimentary	Mainly marine sedimentation	Permian to Early Jurassic	
Koh Ophiolite	Mafic to ultramafic intrusive and extrusive igneous	Volcanism beneath the ocean, then transported and scrapped off during collision between tectonic plates	Early Permian	

In the Permian, the Island was initially located in the southeastern margin of the huge supercontinent of Pangea, and then in the united southern continent of Gondwana. Rocks in Koh-Central, Teremba and Boghen Terranes on the island suggest the units were emplaced and compressed between a volcanic arc and the associated subduction zone (known as a forearc basin along a collisional plate boundary).

From the Upper Cretaceous to Eocene, proto-New Caledonia transformed into an extensional tectonic setting. It is evidenced by a series of marine sedimentary rocks, and can be regarded as a miniature of rifting within Zealandia, and even the partition of Zealandia from Gondwana. Northern Zealandia separated into the Lord Howe Rise in the west and the narrow strip of Norfolk Ridge in the east, of which New Caledonia is the northernmost tip. The New Caledonia Basin hence formed between the two blocks, but is still believed to be continental, though highly extended. Just like the Lord Howe Rise, the Norfolk Ridge extends towards New Zealand in the South via its namesake, the Australian Norfolk Island.

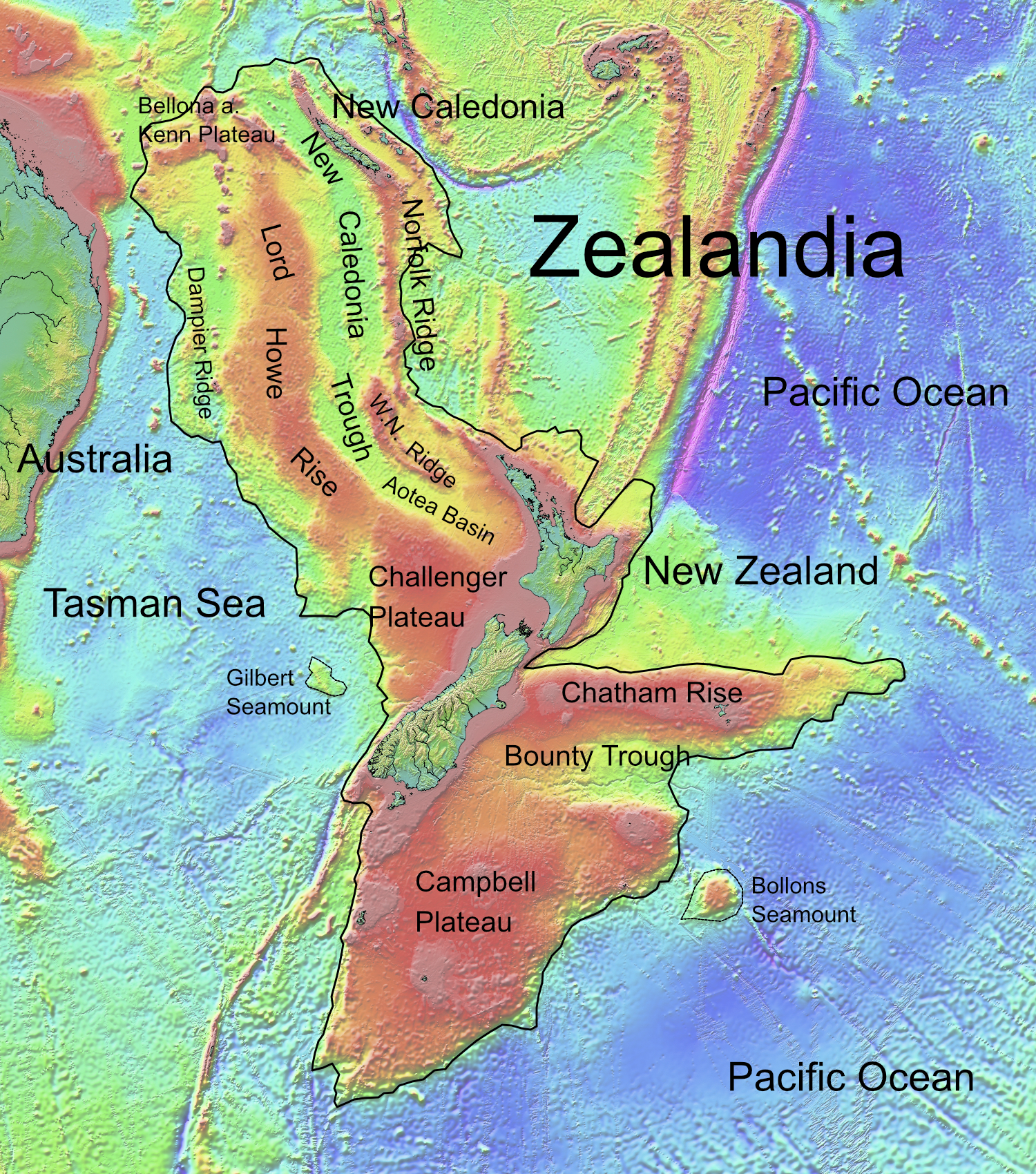
Fig. 3 The position of New Caledonia (top) in Zealandia

However, these were followed by a new collisional event. The abyssal lithosphere east of Grande Terre subducted under an oceanic plate in the east in the South Loyalty Basin. Hence, the associated volcanism during the Eocene is believed to have created the sinuous volcanic island arc of Loyalty Islands/Ridge as the smaller part of the territory. The epoch also oversaw a series of displacement of the oceanic lithosphere onto the east of the continental Norfolk Ridge. One of the products of these dynamic events is the famous and economically significant Peridotite Nappe. This is followed by intrusions of granitoids into the country rocks on Grande Terre.

Since then, the Island re-emerged from the Pacific due to some minor movements. Processes like exhumation, erosion and shallow-sea sedimentation are recorded by series of fossil-bearing lagoonal and fluvial sedimentary rocks. Currently, Grande Terre is surrounded by a barrier reef with a length of 1600 km, thus forming the largest lagoon globally.

Nowadays, the two ridges are generally parallel to each other and connect with the d'Entrecasteaux Ridge in the north. Meanwhile, the North Loyalty Basin is sandwiched by the eastern side of the Loyalty Ridge, as well as the New Hebrides Trench, where the Australian Plate subducts under the micro New Hebrides Plate. Such plate motion makes the Loyalty often suffering from earthquakes.

Notably, the French territory also administers two tiny islands on the New Hebrides Plate − Matthew Island and Hunter Island, though disputed. Therefore, their geology is rather related to the archipelago of Vanuatu, which also claims the active volcanic islands with andesitic composition.

== Petrology ==
=== Grande Terre ===
==== Koh-Central and Teremba Terranes ====
In the fore-arc basin tectonic setting, the suite of Koh Ophiolite is known to be the earliest terrane to be formed on the island in the early Permian. It is unusual that the unit actually was created by two tholeiitic magmatic episodes, and is divided by a layer of boninite. The older and lower layers are therefore intruded by the younger evolved tholeiite as dykes and sills. The rock suite reveals the once oceanic lithosphere was scraped off and retained in the basin during the start of subduction (i.e., a supra-subduction setting). By the U/Pb SHRIMP analysis, its own formation can be traced back to as early as the Carboniferous.

The Koh Ophiolite is overlain by a series of marine sedimentary rocks starting from black shale. This is followed by greywacke of the Central Terrane that bears some pyroclastic characteristics, as well as siltstone and chert.

Meanwhile, the clastic and volcanic rocks of Teremba Terrane formed between the Permian and Early Jurassic. The clastic rocks are mainly greywacke, which could share the same source as those in the Koh-Central Terrane; the composition of the volcanics varies from rhyolitic to andesitic. They are slightly deformed into very-low-grade metamorphic rocks in zeolite facies.

Through basin analysis, it is believed that the two terranes are a pair of "twins": they formed simultaneously along a forearc, with the former one being formed offshore and the latter one in an onshore setting.

==== Boghen Terrane ====
The Boghen Terrane is another group of rocks that formed in that period (Jurassic-Cretaceous). It is basically composed of schists, with the grade ascending from greenschist to blueschist metamorphic facies towards the west. With the protoliths being rocks like tholeiitic basalt and chert, these hint at an oceanic origin of the rock, but materials from land or a volcanic arc are also mixed into the rocks.

Their regoliths contain both oceanic and terrigenous material, including volcanic arc detritus, deposited as an accretionary complex. Likely due to a westward plate subduction, the complex further metamorphosed under high pressure but low temperature in the Late Jurassic to form blueschist.

Nowadays, alongside Koh-Central and Teremba Terranes, the three terranes are found to be lying on the island in a sub-parallel and elongated pattern.

==== Sedimentary rocks from Upper Cretaceous to Eocene ====
Sediments settled during this period tends to become finer-grained over time, indicating the sedimentary environment was subsiding (i.e., a retrogradational parasequence). Sandstone, coal-bearing siltstone and tuff as the record of minor volcanism, are among the first rocks formed in the setting. This group of rocks is called Formation à charbon, and shares an angular unconformity with the underlying older terranes. Zircon analysis of the formation reveals that the sources of the clasts are the three pre-Late Cretaceous Terranes. The presence of angiosperm fossils and coal proved that at least some parts of the island had already emerged from the sea by the Late Cretaceous. However, a shift of fossil records to marine bivalves and gastropods indicate the subsidence of the landmass turned the sedimentary environment into an estuarine one.

Formation à charbon is overlaid by the Paleocene Koumac Terrane, which primarily consists of sedimentary black chert and also some argillite. Collectively known as phtanites, these cherts mark the complete submergence of New Caledonia. On the other hand, the gradual replacement of siliceous content by calcitic micrite signals a northward drift of the continent, where a warmer climate favours deposition of calcite.

In Eocene, on one hand there is an abrupt change of white micrite into pink marl, followed by the deposition of limestone breccia and conglomerates in the North of the Island. Such turbidites and coarse-grained rocks collectively form the Bourail Flysch. These all indicate an uplift of the crust, by a shift of the marine sedimentary records into a lacustrine environment, while the presence of the shallow-water limestone with the same age represents a constant marine environment. Their erosion is believed to be the result of the emersion because of fore-arc bulge, which is linked to a new subduction zone. The limestone is hence overlaid by a 3-to-5-km thick turbidite.

===== "Montagnes Blanches" Nappe and Koné Terrane =====
The Nappe is a sedimentary rock sequence from argillite, chert, micrite and calci-turbidite, and was formed between the Late Cretaceous and Eocene. Pierre Maurizot, the namer of the Nappe, modelled the younger flysch thrust over the native flysch southward to form this displaced unit (allochthon). It is therefore systematically intercalated between the sedimentary rocks mentioned above, and the overlying obducted ophiolite units across the Island.

The Montagnes Blanches Nappe is also overlain by Koné Terre, which is a pelagic unit of siltstone, argillite and chert. Its presence or exposure is limited to Koné and Koumac, and has been overthrust by the Poya Terrane.

==== Poya Terrane and the Peridotite Nappe ====
The two units were oceanic lithosphere that thrust onto a continental landmass (known as Tethyan-style ophiolites). The underlying Poya Terrane on the western coast consists of pillow and massive undepleted mid-oceanic ridge basalts (MORB) with uplifts of m- to km- scale of thickness. K-Ar dating suggest their age to be 61-38 Ma.

The upper Peridotite Nappe not only covers a quarter of the surface of the landmass, but also spreads to the offshore southern part of the Norfolk Ridge. In particular, the large exposure of the unit in the south is known as "Massif du Sud", where profitable metal ores are enriched. As the name suggests, peridotite, particularly harzburgite and lherzolite, are the major components, and are overlain by some dunite and wehrlite. These are the typical compositions of the uppermost part of the mantle, but the unit has overthrusted the terranes below, including the Poya Terrane to become a Nappe. This is supported by the crustal gabbronorites at the flat top of the nappe. Yet, sheeted dykes and pillow basalt layers are absent above the gabbro, which is unusual for an ophiolitic suite. The fault caused by overthrusting has a dip of 20°, with the presence of porphyroclastic mylonite to mark the shear zone. It is further crosscut by varied types of the younger intrusive rocks, for instance, the sheared mafic amphibolites and felsic granitoids. It has currently been heavily eroded and leached as laterite, with a number of endemic flora only found on the rare ultrabasic leached product.

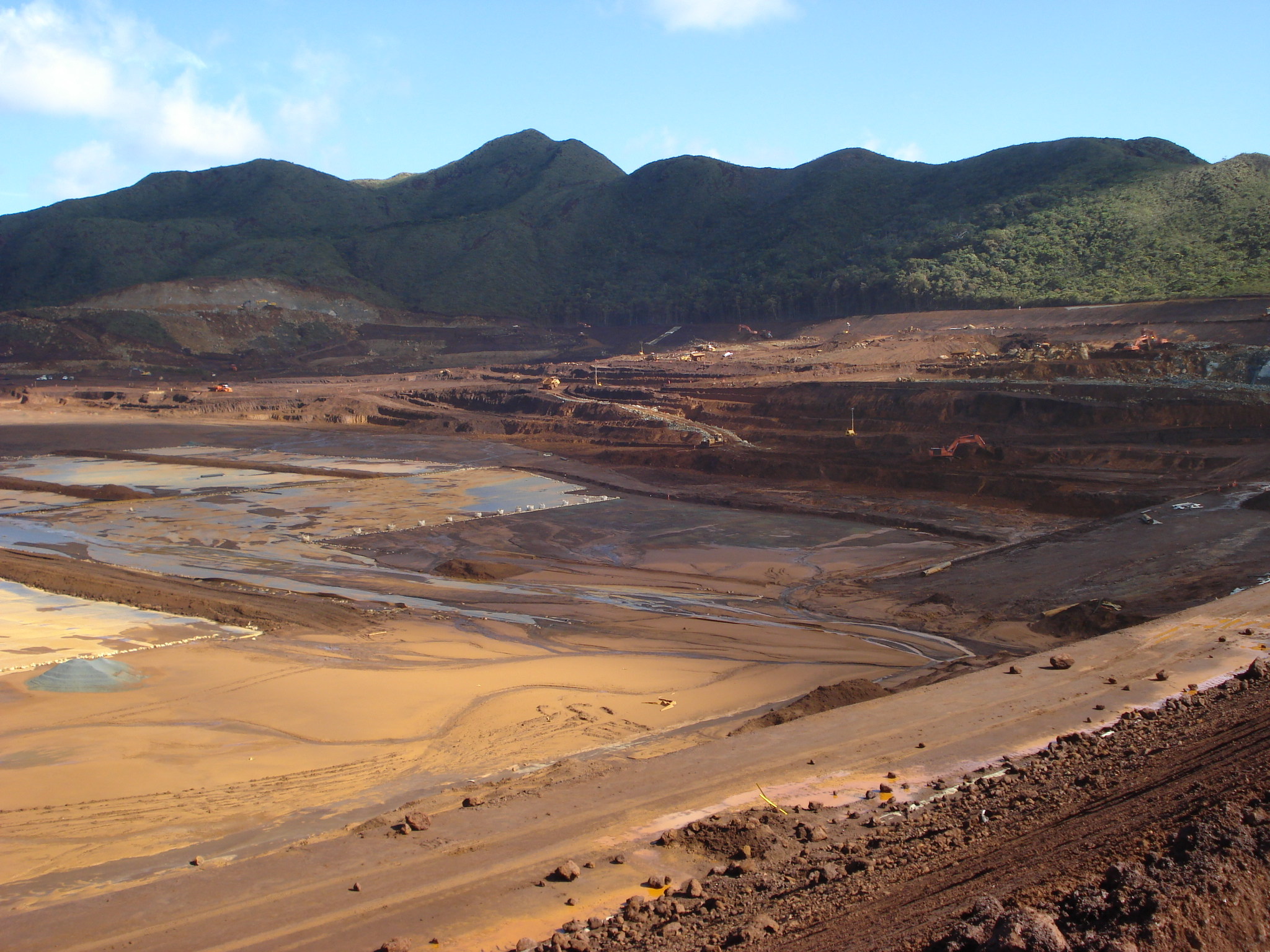
Fig. 4 Laterite in the Goro mine.

The two units sandwich another two formations: the Nepoui Flysch and Koumac Olistostrome. The former one is thinner with biocalcarenite at the bottom, then argillite, arenite and dolomicrite. Originated from the Poya Terrane, the arenite contains clasts of clinopyroxene, ilmenite and magnetite. The latter one's thickness is about 300 m, with the sequence from the bottom as the mass flow breccia along with some dolomicrite, then peridotite-associated sands. These may represent the marine deposition above the Poya Terrane before obduction.

Their presence on high altitude is extraordinary already, as oceanic lithospheres normally subduct rather than thrust onto less dense continental basements. Moreover, since their relative positions are reversed compared to the other ophiolitic suites, their genetic relationships are disputed. One of the explanations is that during the uplift by compression, the top mafic terrane slid off by faulting and gravity onto the Norfolk Ridge, followed by the ultramafic Nappe. This is based on a lack of obduction-induced thickening or deformation in the Nappe but the presence of the olistostrome.

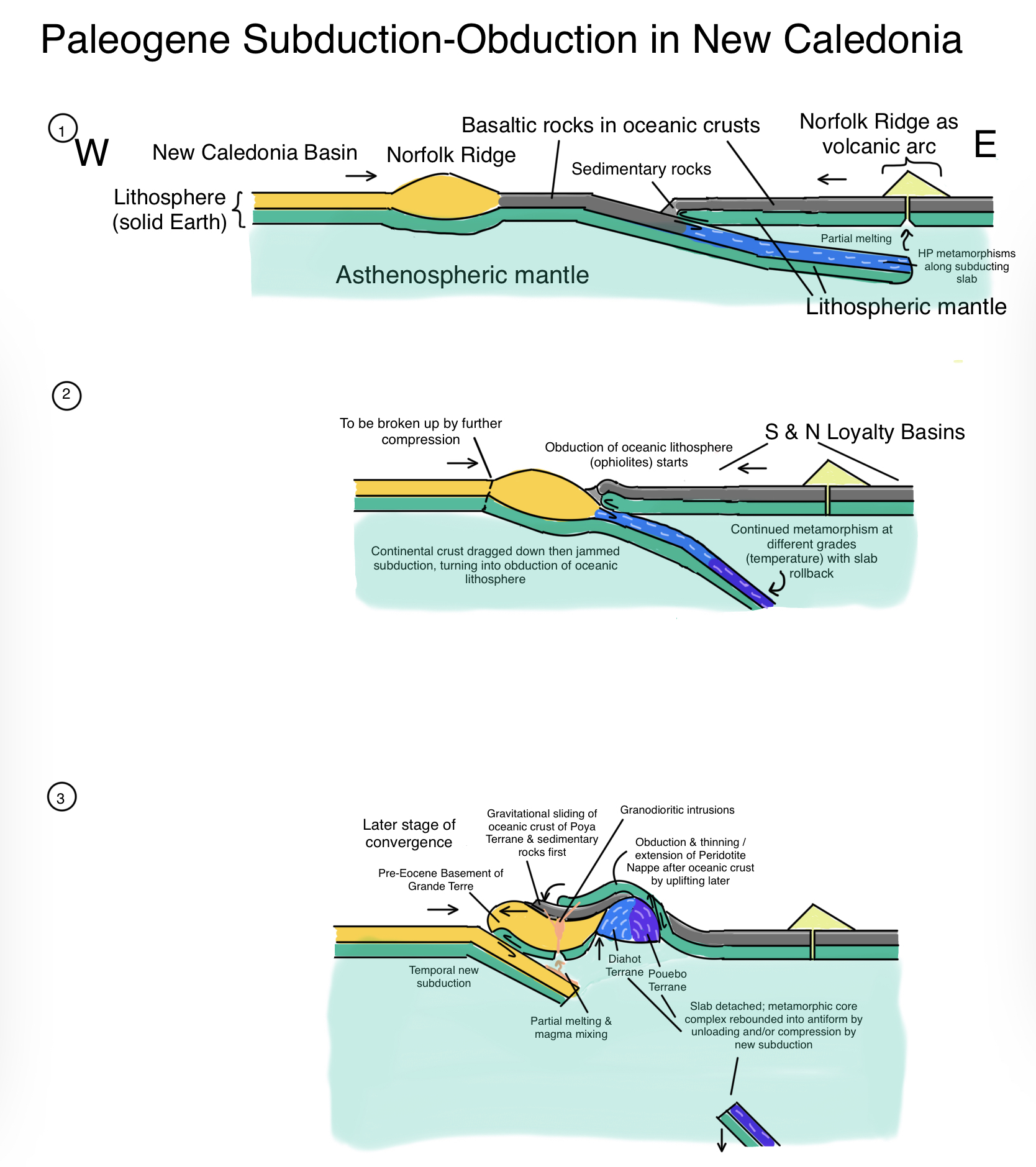
Fig. 5 Simplified cross-sectional evolution of the Eocene and granitoid units with respect to New Caledonia tectonics at that period, modified from Cluzel et al. (2005 and 2012), Patriat et al. (2018). Things are not drawn to scale.

==== Eocene metamorphic complex ====
The complex consists of two parts: the Pouébo and Diahot Terranes. They both have experienced clockwise P/T paths of metamorphism with similar age (44–34 Ma), which is typical for metamorphic rocks that formed along a subducting slab. With the forming conditions of high pressure but low temperature, it is therefore believed to be formed along the detached Australian slab of the oceanic lithosphere, right before the obduction of the Eocene ophiolites.

Sharing the same sedimentary sequence, the Diahot Terrane is regarded as the metamorphosed layer of the Montagnes Blanches Nappe and the Koné Terrane. The terrane itself consists of blueschist and eclogite in albite–epidote–omphacite, as well as ferroglaucophane–lawsonite mineral zones. Such mineral assemblages help the estimation of the burial depth to be 50 km.

As the Pouebo Terrane is formed deeper in the mantle (80 km), the rocks have a higher-grade garnet-bearing greenish eclogite and glaucophanite. It also contains eclogitic mélange that is believed to be originated from the dragged-down and the subducted part of the Poya Terrane.

Models suggest the complex have isostatically rebounded to form the Mount Panie Antiform during an extensional event with Diahot in the west, and Pouebo in the east, after obduction later on. This could indicate a renewed compression afterwards.

==== Eocene dykes and Oligocene plutonic rocks ====
After the obduction event, there were several intrusions of granitoid magmas into the allochthon that could be initiated by the subduction of the New Caledonia Basin. Some form dykes in the Eocene to crosscut the Peridotite Nappe, while the others form plutons in the Oligocene. The dykes' composition varies from dioritic to trondhjemitic. The plutonic magmas were heterogeneous in composition, possibly related to the post-obduction detached slab. Moreover, their presence could imply a short-lived post-obduction reactivated subduction from the East due to continued compression. The composition of the plutons ranges from high-K to medium-K calc-alkaline, hence forming granodiorite and adamellite.

==== Rock formations since Miocene ====
Sedimentary rocks of the Nepoui Series are spotted in places like Nepoui Bay, which include lagoonal limestone, calcareous sand to slightly unconformable conglomerate and sands again. Re-emergence of plant fossils after obduction is spotted in the latter layer. The regolith pebbles in the conglomerate are well-rounded and cover and consist of pre-existing local rocks like peridotite. Similar conglomerates and breccias are also found in the Gwa (or Goa) N'doro Formation near Houaïlou, and represents the remnants of a river network developed since Miocene. These all witness the uplift, erosion, then deposition of the island since Oligocene.

Entering the Quaternary, wind-transported aeolianites are the newest formations above the sea level; while the barrier reef is developing along the coastal area.

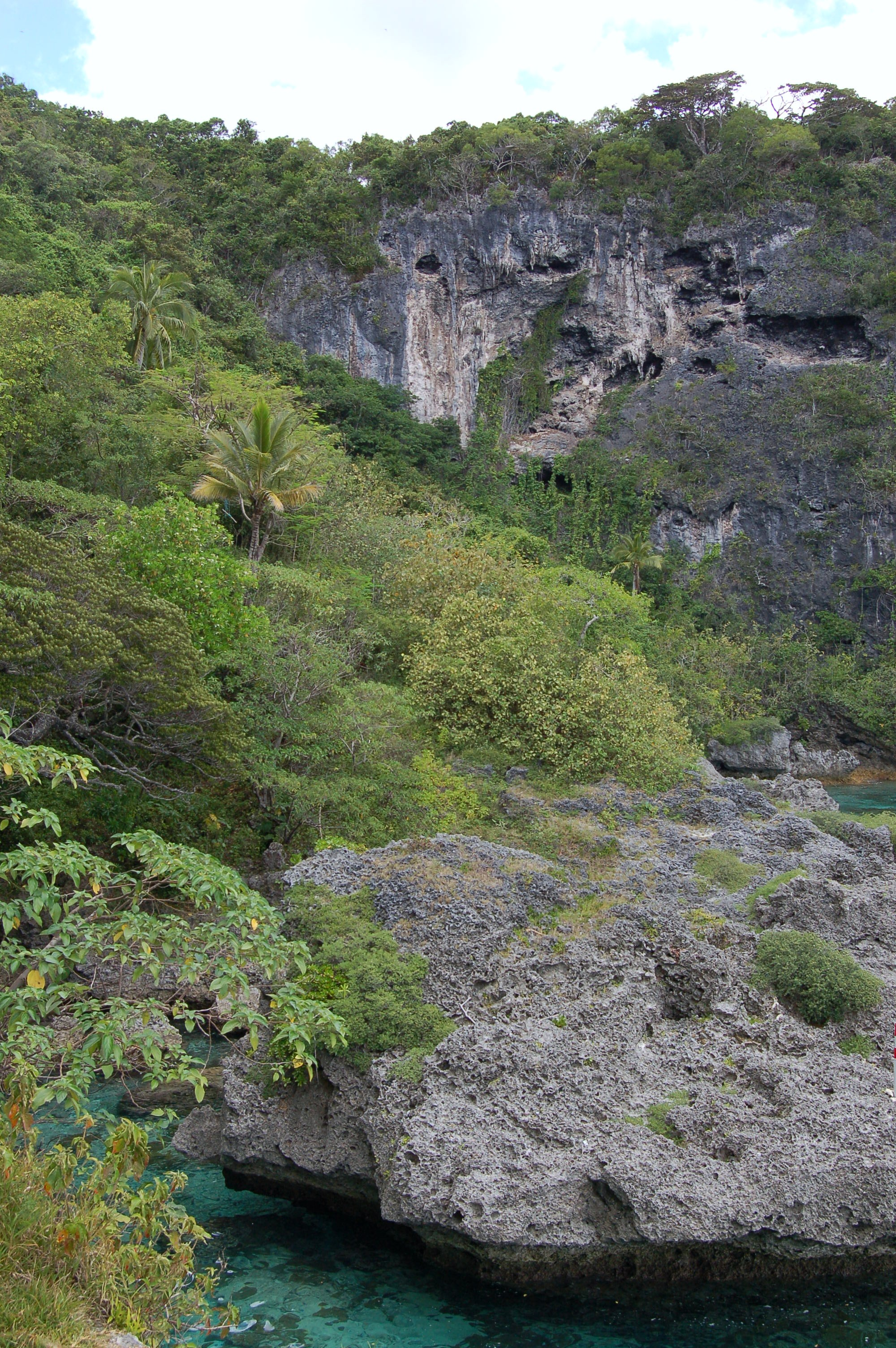
Fig. 6 Outcrop of carbonate rocks on Lifou Island, Loyalty.

=== Loyalty Islands ===
Compared to Grande Terre, the islands are the younger part of the territory with no common geological units between them. The islands and the submerged parts of the Loyalty Ridge are overlain by Miocene carbonate sedimentary rocks, as well as modern coral reefs. These makes investigations on its formation more complicated, but geophysical and bathymetric data found the seamounts are just similar to the other island arcs. Moreover, Eocene andesitic rocks have been drilled there, while ocean island basalt (OIB) on Maré Island hints the Islands could represent a north–south trending hotspot. Combining the features of the subduction-obduction complex on Grande Terre, the explanation of the island arc is more likely. Although their formation is disputed, it is agreed their recent uplift and emergence are associated with subduction of the Australian Plate, in which the section of the crust nearby is bulge.

== Tectonic evolution ==
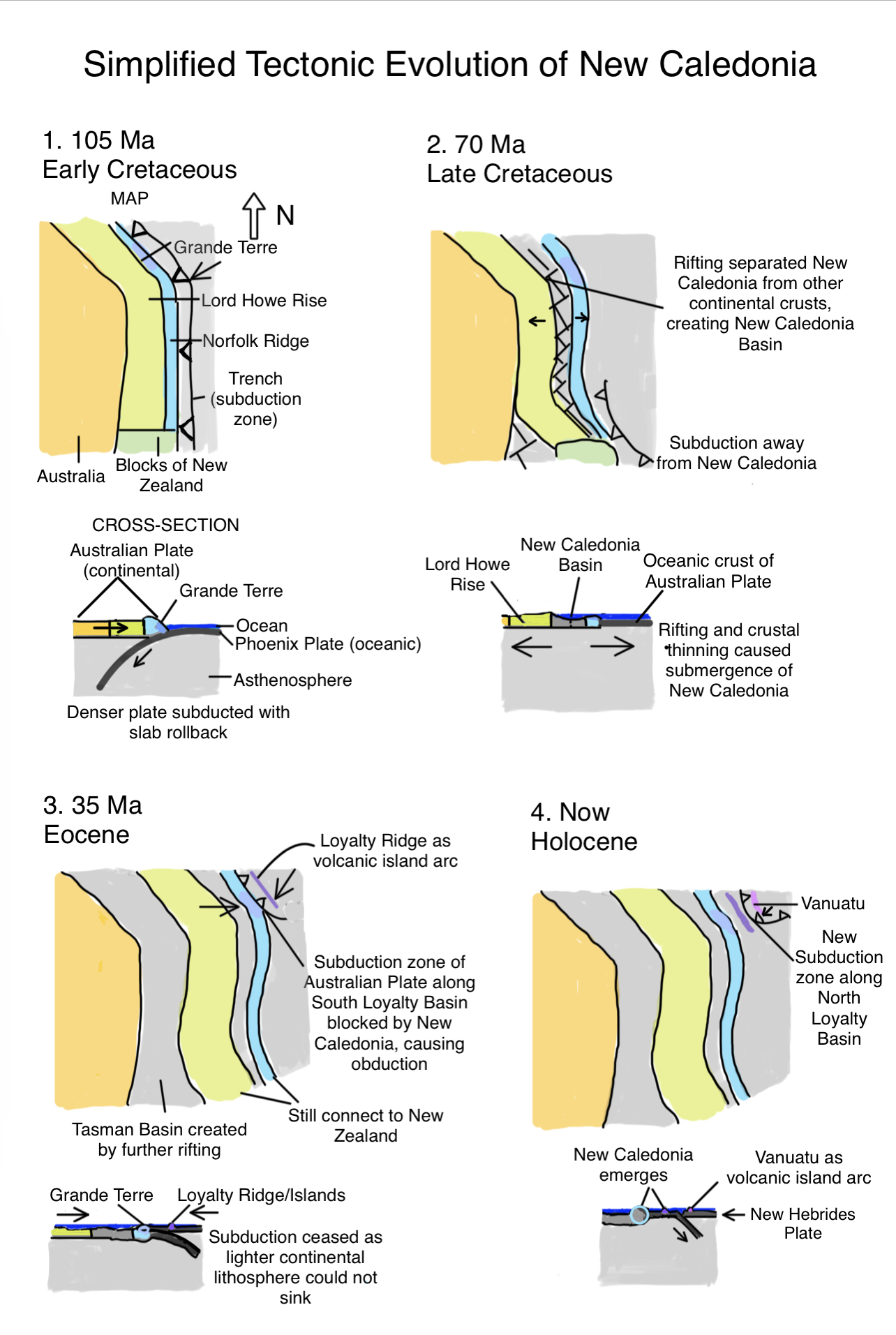
Fig. 7 Simplified tectonic evolution of New Caledonia; not drawn to scale, and only related continental blocks are colored. Modified from Cluzel et al. (2012).

By observing the properties and also the age of the rocks in different terranes, the tectonic evolution of the region can be reconstructed into three phases, with each phase illustrated in the sections below.

=== Pre-Early Cretaceous subduction of Phoenix Plate ===
The first phase starts from the Permian to the upper Cretaceous and is also known as the Gondwana Phase. Combined analysis of the three terranes suggests the Grande Terre formed at the eastern edge of a volcanic forearc related to subduction. In particular, the Koh Ophiolite marks the initiation of the subduction of the extinct Phoenix Plate. When the slab subducted under the united southern continent of Gondwana, part of it metamorphosed into the Boghen Terrane; volatiles as by-products initiated partial melting, leading to volcanic eruptions, as evidenced by the Teremba volcanic rocks. Related magmatism persisted until mid-Cretaceous time. Also, as the deep-sea sedimentary rocks show, the region was located at the southeast Gondwana marginal basin system that opened between the Permian and the Cretaceous, with Australia being the source of the sediments. Yet, fossil records also reveal part of the landmass was already terrestrial by the Late Jurassic.

=== Rifting from Upper Cretaceous to Eocene ===
In the Late Cretaceous, marginal rifting occurred on the island, leading to the complete submergence of the island. On a macro-scale, as evidenced by the presence of endemic fossil species, Zealandia drifted away from the rest of Gondwana relatively to the northeast, particularly away from the Australian and the Antarctic land masses. These are probably accommodated by the trench rollback of the previous subduction zone, with backarc extension taking place in the East. Units like the Formation à charbon and the Koné Terrane are all consistent with the hypothesis that Grande Terre was laid on a passive margin. Meanwhile, the Boghen Terrane's high-pressure schists exhumed due to rifting and unloading.

=== Subductions and obduction in Eocene and Oligocene ===
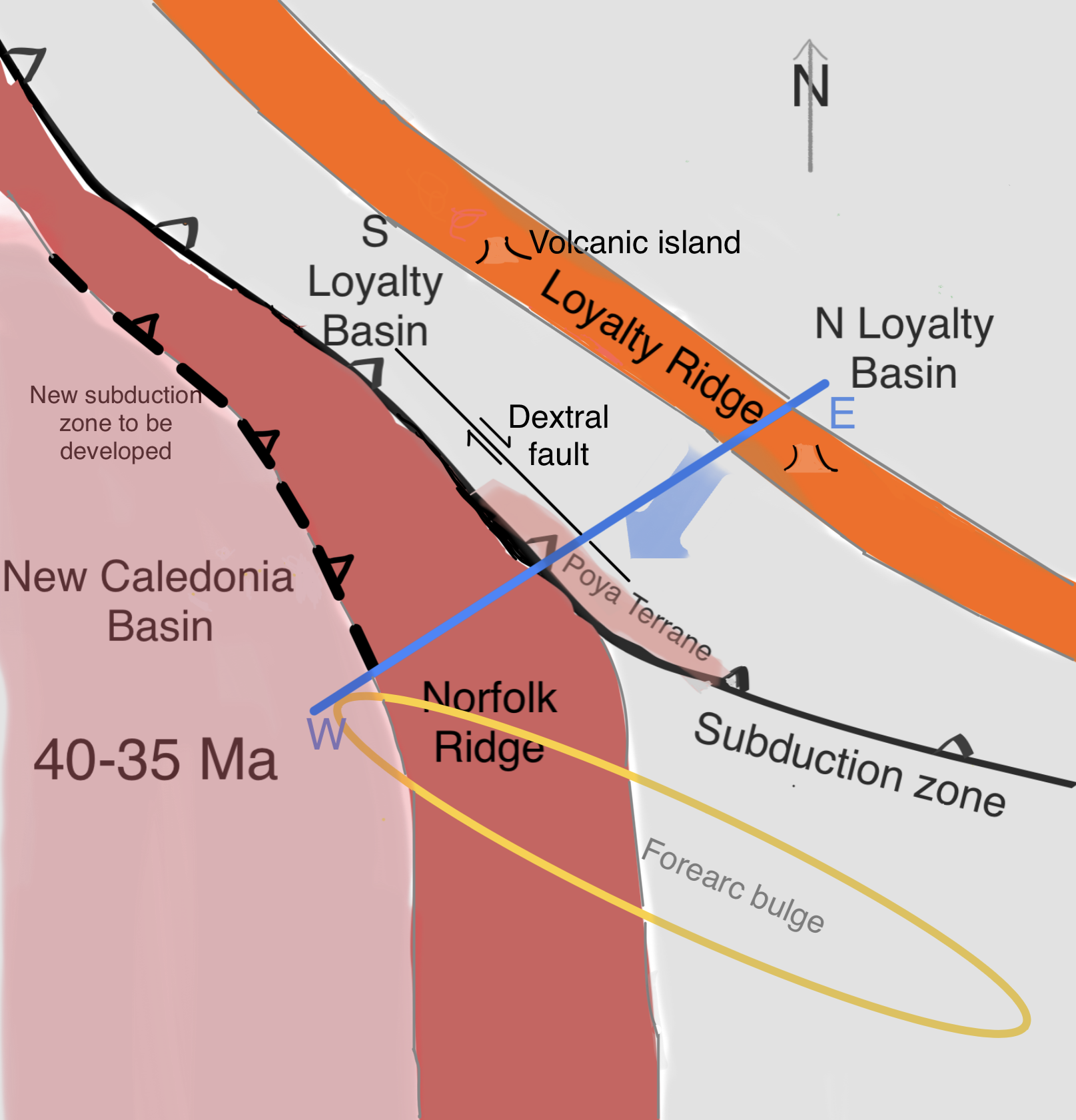
Fig. 8 Simplified map of New Caledonia tectonics in Eocene, modified from Cluzel et al. (2019) and Patriat et al. (2018). For the cross-sectional evolution with line marked in blue from west (W) to east (E), please refer to Fig. 5.

Entering the Eocene, the tectonic setting shifted back to a collision one, but the mechanisms are not well understood. One of the explanations is the reactivation of the former backarc spreading ridge into a trench by the convection current, causing subduction of the Australian Plate from 55 Ma.

The presence of the subduction-obduction complex suggests a sequence of a new intra-oceanic subduction zone with dextral components. The interception of the trench and the Norfolk Ridge evolved into Grande Terre. The basaltic Poya Terrane and the South Loyalty Basin can be interpreted as the new forearc, with an extinct trench along the Basin, while the North Loyalty Basin is the backarc. As the oceanic lithosphere of the Australian Plate was subducting under an oceanic plate in the northeast, the descending slab metamorphosed to become the Diahot and Pouébo Terranes under high pressure. The moisture released from metamorphism caused partial melting, initiating a series of extrusive volcanism to form the arc of Loyalty Ridge/Islands. The oblique subduction was then jammed by the more buoyant continental lithosphere of the Norfolk Ridge, which resists sinkage further into the mantle. Instead, the oceanic lithosphere obducted above the basement of the Norfolk Ridge, thus bringing units like the Poya Terrane and the Peridotite Nappe onto Grande Terre.

After obduction, the uplift and exhumation of the metamorphic core complex between Oligocene and Miocene are either simultaneous, or resultant of an extensional event i.e. unloading due to slab detachment. Intrusion of granitoids into the Peridotite Nappe also happened in the Oligocene, possibly due to a short-term reactivated subduction from the New Caledonia Basin. Such hypothesis is synchronized with the proposed relationship between the metamorphic antiform and a renewed compression by such motion.

=== Re-emergence of New Caledonia after Oligocene ===
Nepoui Series witnessed the uplift of Grande Terre in the Miocene, possibly by the forearc bulge in response to the subduction nearby to Vanuatu. It was followed by erosion with deposition happening again, along with the development of fluvial network(s). Nowadays, the tropical climate on the island facilitates heavy erosion, while the coral reef surrounding the islands has started developing only in the last 400,000 years.

Meanwhile, as the Loyalty Ridge approaches the New Hebrides Trench in the east, current seismic activity is triggered with potential orogeny in the future.

== Earth resources ==
Due to the obduction of the Peridotite Nappe, originating in the metal-enriched mantle, metal ores are concentrated as the main earth resources in the region.

=== Nickel and cobalt ===
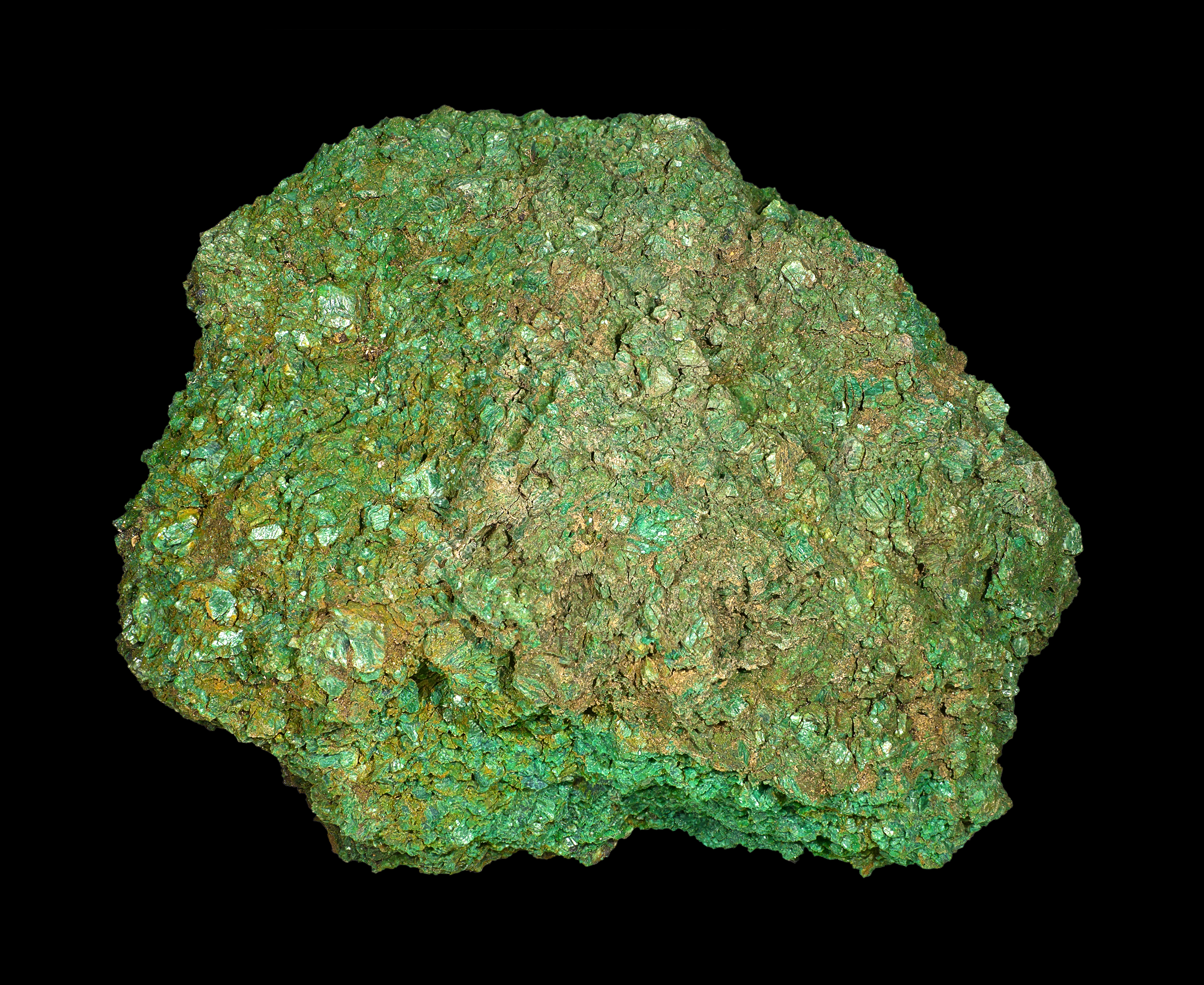
Fig. 9 Népouite, a clay silicate lateritic nickel ore deposit named after the local Népoui Mine, is found on the Peridotite Nappe. The nickel element in 2+ oxidation state gives the green colour.

Nickel (Ni) and cobalt (Co) ore minerals are enriched in laterite, a material forming at the lower part of the weathering profile of the Peridotite Nappe. The tropical climate provides perfect conditions for its formation through hydrolysis of olivine and pyroxenes in the rock. There are three types of the Ni-rich laterite: Iron oxy-hydroxide deposits like goethite, hydrous magnesium silicate deposits like Mg-Ni talc, and clay silicate deposits. Among these, only the first type is rich in Co too.

Being the most important earth resource in the territory, the nickel mining industry has contributed to a high local GDP per capita in past decades. With more than 10 million tonnes of ore reserves, New Caledonia is the fourth largest nickel exporter in the world.

Cobalt mining was also very important, and was mined in different sites from that of nickel. Being first mined between 1876 and 1906, the territory was the monopoly of the cobalt exportation globally, but is no longer operational since the 1920s.

=== Chromium ===
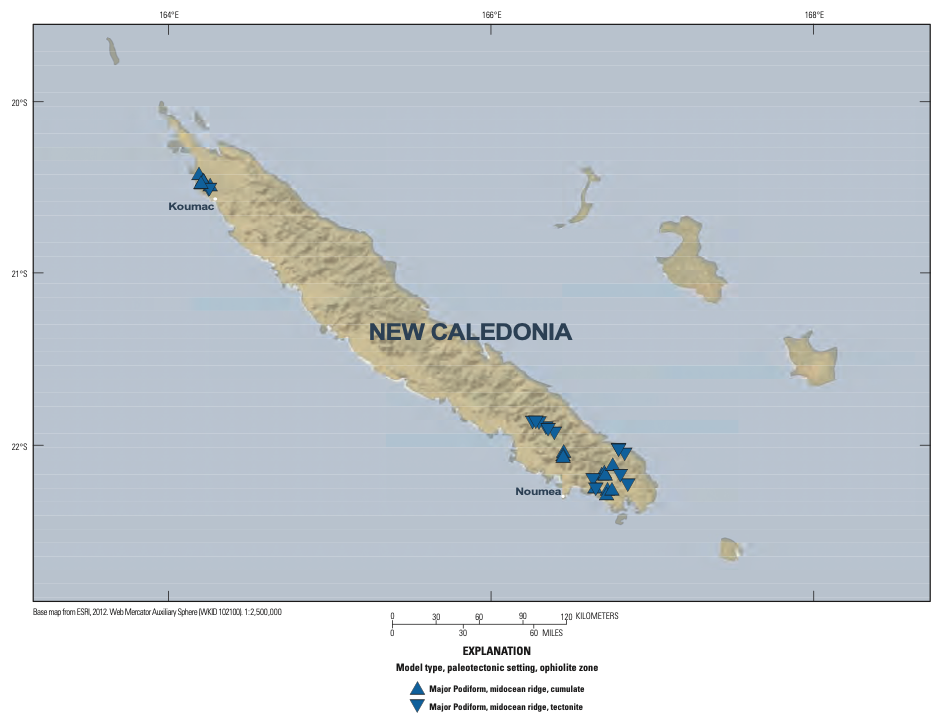
Fig. 10 Chromite distribution in New Caledonia, by USGS (2012).

The mantle-derived Peridotite Nappe also consists of dunite in the harzburgite–lherzolite transition zone. In particular, the rock podiform chromitite bears chromite, which is one of the ore minerals of chromium. Particularly, the deposits in Poum Massif are believed to be crystallized in a supra-subduction setting from boninitic to tholeiitic magmas, then transported by an asthenospheric (lherzolite) intrusion along a transform fault (hence, the Eocene oblique subduction in Fig. 8 could reasonably help prove it).

Over 3 million tonnes of ore had been mined since the 1880s, but the last mine closed in the 1990s.

Note that the podiform chromitites are also enriched in platinum group elements like osmium, iridium and ruthenium relatively, but the concentrations are still not high enough for extraction.

=== Iron ===
Sharing the same source as nickel, the iron ore of ferricrete is extensively found on the top of the laterite profiles. It was mined and exported until 1960, when its high impurities of nickel and chromium make the ore no longer suitable for the new smelting industry.

=== Other metals ===
Gold was extracted in the Fern Hill Mine in the late 19th century, while its occurrence in other places on the island lacks economic importance. Copper, lead and silver were also found in the Diahot Terrane at the same time, with discontinued mining undertaken in the mid 20th Century.

Manganese ore, in the form of small pods, was extracted from the Poya basalts and the altered Peridotite Nappe, from 1918 to 1922 and again from 1949 to 1953.

Stibnite, the antimony-bearing ore mineral found in quartz veins, was also mined shortly between 1883 and 1884.

=== Non-metals ===
There are also some minor non-metal resources. For instance, phosphate was mined on the small Walpole Island of the Loyalty Islands from 1888 to 1914.

Limestone formations, except for those which were formed in the Paleocene, have been mined for the local cement industry, as well as for nickel hydrometallurgy.

Hydrocarbons are also found onshore and offshore of Grande Terre. Coal in the Formation à charbon was mined near Moindou on the west coast for a short period between 1924 and 1930 and was consumed in the first Ni smelters in Nouméa. Furthermore, there are potentials for petroleum and gas extraction off the west coast of the Grande Terre, which belongs to the Tasman Frontier area of northern Zealandia.

== See also ==
- Zealandia
- Geology of New Zealand
- Geology of Metropolitan France
