= Walpole (EIC ship) =

Five ships named Walpole have sailed as an East Indiaman for the British East India Company (EIC):

All were built on the River Thames, and named originally after Robert Walpole, who was influential in the company's affairs in 1720 and 1721 and was appointed prime minister that year. His nephew Thomas Walpole (1727–1803) was a director of the company from 1753 to 1754.

- Walpole (1721 EIC ship) made four complete voyages for the EIC and was sold in 1737 for breaking up.
- Walpole (1738 EIC ship) made four complete voyages for the EIC and was sold in 1751.
- Walpole (1752 EIC ship) made three complete voyages for the EIC and was captured by the French in 1762 during her fourth voyage.
- Walpole (1779 EIC ship) made seven complete voyages for the EIC and was sold in 1799 for breaking up.
- Walpole (1798 EIC ship) made four complete voyages for the EIC and was lost in 1808 as she was returning to London from her fifth voyage.
