= Obduction =

Geological process at tectonic plate boundaries

Obduction is a geological process whereby denser oceanic crust (and even upper mantle) is scraped off a descending ocean plate at a convergent plate boundary and thrust on top of an adjacent plate. When oceanic and continental plates converge, normally the denser oceanic crust sinks under the continental crust in the process of subduction. Obduction, which is less common, normally occurs in plate collisions at orogenic belts (some of the material from the subducting oceanic plate is emplaced onto the continental plate) or back-arc basins (regions where the edge of a continent is pulled away from the rest of the continent due to the stress of plate collision).

Obduction of oceanic lithosphere produces a characteristic set of rock types called an ophiolite. This assemblage consists of deep-marine sedimentary rock (chert, limestone, clastic sediments), volcanic rocks (pillow lavas, volcanic glass, volcanic ash, sheeted dykes and gabbros) and peridotite (mantle rock). John McPhee describes ophiolite formation by obduction as "where ocean crust slides into a trench and goes under a continent, [and] a part of the crust—i.e., an ophiolite—is shaved off the top and ends up on the lip of the continent."

Obduction can occur where a fragment of continental crust is caught in a subduction zone with resulting overthrusting of oceanic mafic and ultramafic rocks from the mantle onto the continental crust. Obduction often occurs where a small tectonic plate is caught between two larger plates, with the crust (both island arc and oceanic) welding onto an adjacent continent as a new terrane. When two continental plates collide, obduction of the oceanic crust between them is often a part of the resulting orogeny.

== Formation types ==
=== Upwedging in subduction zones ===
This process is operative beneath and behind the inner walls of oceanic trenches (subduction zone) where slices of oceanic crust and mantle are ripped from the upper part of the descending plate and wedged and packed in high pressure assemblages against the leading edge of the other plate.

Weakening and cracking of oceanic crust and upper mantle is likely to occur in the tensional regime. This results in the incorporation of ophiolite slabs into the overriding plate. Progressive packing of ophiolite slices and arc fragments against the leading edge of a continent may continue over a long period of time and lead to a form of continental accretion.

=== Compressional telescoping onto Atlantic-type continental margins ===
The simplest form of this type of obduction may follow from the development of a subduction zone near the continental margin. Above and behind the subduction zone, a welt of oceanic crust and mantle rides up over the descending plate. The ocean, intervening between the continental margin and the subduction zone is progressively swallowed until the continental margin arrives at the subduction zone and a giant wedge or slice (nappe) of oceanic crust and mantle is pushed across the continental margin. Because the buoyancy of the relatively light continental crust is likely to prohibit its extensive subduction, a flip in subduction polarity will occur yielding an ophiolite sheet lying above a descending plate.

If however, a large tract of ocean intervenes between the continental margin the subduction zone, a fully developed arc and back-arc basin may eventually arrive and collide with the continental margin. Further convergence may lead to overthrusting of the volcanic arc assemblage and may be followed by flipping of the subduction polarity. According to the rock assemblage as well as the complexly deformed ophiolite basement and arc intrusions, the Coastal Complex of western Newfoundland may well have been formed by this mechanism.

=== Gravity sliding onto Atlantic-type continental margins ===
This concept involves the progressive uplift of an actively spreading oceanic ridge, the detachment of slices from the upper part of the lithosphere, and the subsequent gravity sliding of these slices onto the continental margin as ophiolites. This concept was advocated by Reinhardt for the emplacement of the Semail Ophiolite complex in Oman and argued by Church and Church and Stevens for the emplacement of the Bay of Islands sheet in western Newfoundland. This concept has subsequently been replaced by hypotheses that advocate subduction of the continental margin beneath oceanic lithosphere.

=== Transformation of a spreading ridge to a subduction zone ===
Many ophiolite complexes were emplaced as thin, hot obducted sheets of oceanic lithosphere shortly after their generation by plate accretion. The change from a spreading plate boundary to a subduction plate boundary may result from rapid rearrangement of relative plate motion. A transform fault may also become a subduction zone, with the side with the higher, hotter, thinner lithosphere riding over the lower, colder lithosphere. This mechanism would lead to obduction of ophiolite complex if it occurred near a continental margin.

=== Interference of a spreading ridge and a subduction zone ===
In the situation where a spreading ridge approaches a subduction zone, the ridge collides with the subduction zone, at which time there will develop a complex interaction of subduction-related tectonic sedimentary rock and spreading-related tectonic igneous activity. The left-over ridge may either subduct or ride upward across the trench onto arc trench gap and arc terranes as a hot ophiolite slice.

A potential example is the progressive diminution of the Farallon plate off California. Ophiolite obduction would not be expected as the two plates share a dextral transform boundary. However, the major collision of the Kula/Pacific plate with the Alaskan/Aleutian resulted in the initiation of subduction of the Pacific plate beneath Alaska, with no sign of either obduction or indeed any major manifestation of a ridge being "swallowed".

=== Rear-arc basin ===
Dewey and Bird suggest that a common form of ophiolite obduction is related to the closure of rear-arc marginal basins and that, during such closure by subduction, slices of oceanic crust and mantle may be expelled onto adjacent continental forelands and emplaced as ophiolite sheets. In the high heat-flow region of a volcanic arc and rear-arc basin the lithosphere is particularly thin.

This thin lithosphere may preferentially fail along gently dipping thrust surface if a compressional stress is applied to the region. Under these circumstances, a thin sheet of lithosphere may become detached and begin to ride over adjacent lithosphere to finally become emplaced as a thin ophiolite sheet on the adjacent continental foreland. This mechanism is a form of plate convergence where a thin, hot layer of oceanic lithosphere is obducted over cooler and thicker lithosphere.

=== Continental collision ===
As an ocean is progressively trapped in between two colliding continental lithospheres, the rising wedges of oceanic crust and mantle rise are caught between the continental plates and detach and begin to move up the advancing continental rise. Continued convergence may lead to the overthrusting of the arc-trench gap and eventually overthrusting of the metamorphic plutonic and volcanic rocks of the volcanic arc.

Following total subduction of an oceanic tract, continuing convergence may lead to a further sequence of intra-continental mechanisms of crustal shortening. This mechanism is thought to be responsible for the various ocean basins of the Mediterranean region. The Alpide belt is believed to register a complex history of plate interactions during the general convergence of the Eurasian and African plates.

== Examples ==
There are few continental plates being obducted under an oceanic plate known today, but in the past it appears to have happened a number of times. Thus there are examples of oceanic crustal rocks and deeper mantle rocks that have been obducted and are now exposed at the surface, worldwide. New Caledonia is one example of recent obduction. The Klamath Mountains of northern California contain several obducted oceanic slabs, most famously the Coast Range Ophiolite. Obducted fragments also are found, for example, in the Hajar Mountains of Oman, the Troodos Mountains of Cyprus, Newfoundland, New Zealand, the Alps of Europe, the Shetland islands of Unst and Fetlar, Leka island in Norway, and the Blue Ridge Ophiolite in the Appalachian Mountains of eastern North America.

== See also ==
- List of tectonic plate interactions – Types of plate boundaries
