= Samail Ophiolite =

Slab of oceanic crust

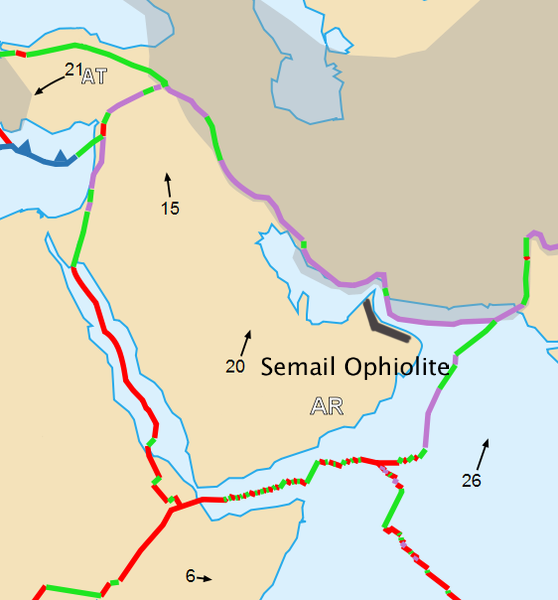
Arabian Plate map with Samail Ophiolite location on the eastern corner of the Arabian Peninsula

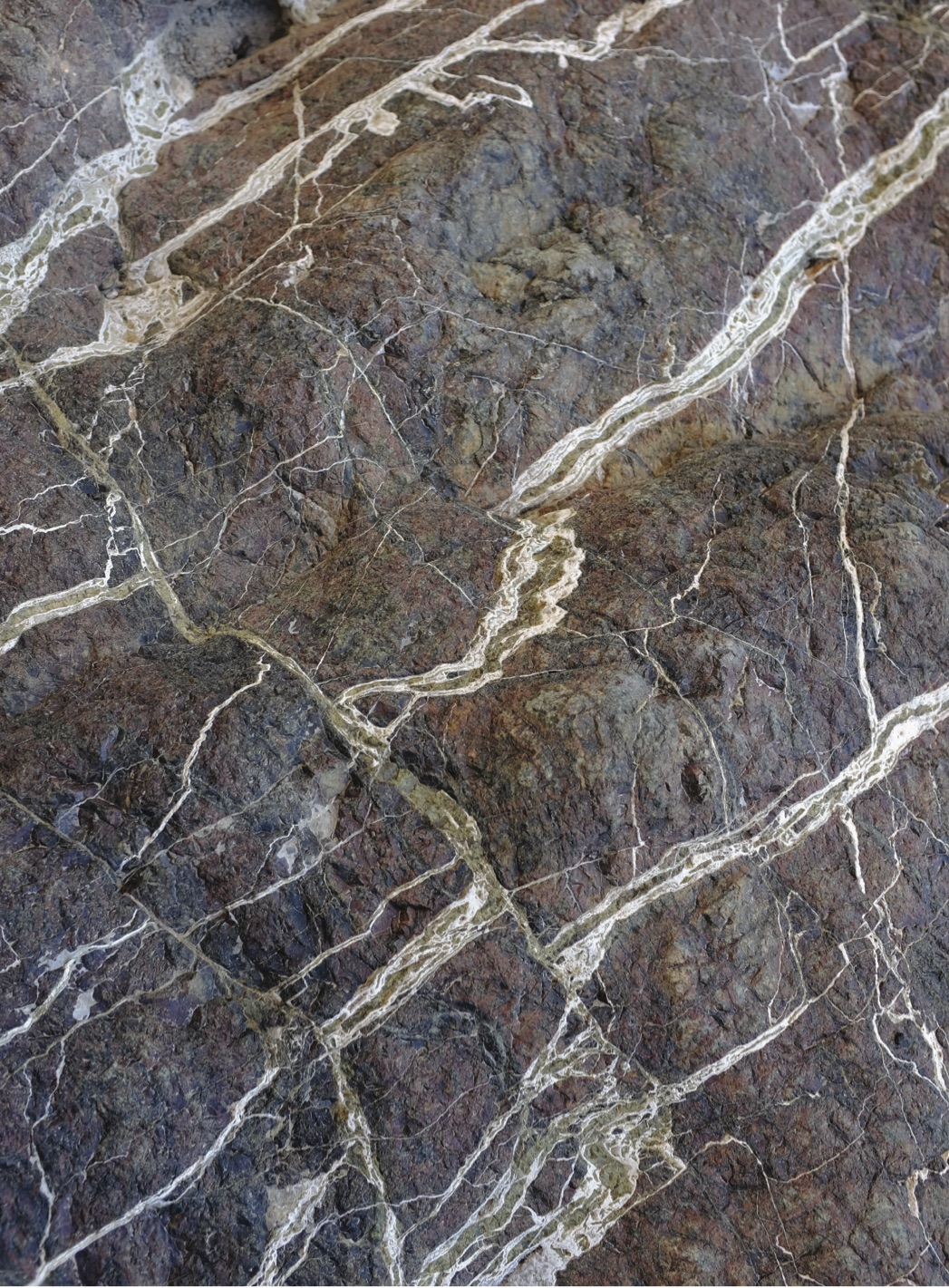
Close-up view of a section of the ophiolite.

The Samail Ophiolite, also known as the Semail Ophiolite, is a large, ancient geological formation in Oman and the United Arab Emirates in the Arabian Peninsula. It is one of the world's largest and best-exposed segments of oceanic crust, made of volcanic rocks and ultramafic rocks from the Earth's upper mantle that was overthrust onto the continental crust. This ophiolite provides insight into the dynamics of oceanic crust formation and the tectonic processes involved in the creation of ocean basins.

Formed during the Late Cretaceous period, approximately 95 million years ago, the Samail Ophiolite represents a fragment of the Tethyan Oceanic crust that was thrust over continental crust due to the convergence of the African and Eurasian tectonic plates. This geological phenomenon, known as obduction, makes it a site for studying the processes of oceanic crust formation, subduction, and obduction.

It covers an area of around 100,000 square kilometers, and is a complete and well-preserved stratigraphic section. This includes layers from the Earth's upper mantle, along with cumulate rocks, gabbros, sheeted dike complexes, and volcanic sequences, providing a vertical profile of oceanic lithosphere. It is primarily made of silicate rocks with (SiO_{2}) content ranging from 45 to 77 wt%.

== Geologic formations ==
The Arabian continental margin formed in the early Paleozoic and possibly the late Proterozoic. After that the thrust sheets are from low to high structurally: the autochthonous units, and the allochthonous units. The allochthonous units, from low to high structurally, are the Sumeini group, the Hawasina complex, the Haybi complex, the Ophiolite, and the Batinah complex. From the Sumeini group to the Haybi Complex make up the continental slope with an age range from Middle Triassic to Late Cretaceous. The ophiolite formed in the Late Cretaceous and consists of a basal metamorphic sole (150–200 m), peridotite tectonic (8–12 km), igneous peridotite and gabbro (0.5–6.5 km), sheeted dikes (1–1.5 km), and lavas (0.5–2.0 km). The Batinah complex containing continental margin sediments came from beneath the ophiolite during late-stage extensional faulting and then slid into the ophiolite late in the emplacement history.

=== Metamorphic Sole ===
There are two locations where the metamorphic core of the ophiolite are exposed. These locations occur at the Sumeini Window and the Wadi Tayyin. The Sumeini Window is located in northern Oman at the base of the ophiolite. The Wadi Tayyin is located in southwestern Oman near the classic Green Pool locality. The metamorphic rocks include garnet and clinopyroxene-bearing granulite, hornblende and plagioclase amphibolite, epidote, and greenschist facies sediments that include cherts, marbles, and quartzites. Although there have been many theories about the pressure-temperature environment of these metamorphic soles, Cowan et al. suggest that the formational temperatures and pressure of the metamorphic being 770-900 degrees Celsius and 11-13 kbar respectively are representative of a subduction zone that was present before the emplacement of the ophiolite.

== Formation ==
There are three different models that may explain how the Samail Ophiolite could form and overthrust a continental margin:

- The gravity sliding model: A seven to 20 km thick ophiolitic terrane could slide onto a continental margin. This requires an elevated source region, which presents difficulties.
- The obducting model: The oceanic lithosphere over thrust continental lithosphere (Fig. 3). Figure 3-A, older than 101 to 95 Ma the mid-ocean ridge is spreading and the oceanic lithosphere subducted under both continental lithosphere. The Samail Ophiolite initial place is marked on the right oceanic lithosphere. Figure 3-B, from 95 to 87 Ma the mid-ocean ridge stopped spreading and the intra-oceanic thrusting started. Where the left oceanic lithosphere subducted under the right oceanic lithosphere with the Samail Ophiolite, which are accreted at amphibolite facies conditions at the base of the Samail Ophiolite. Figure 3-C, from 87 to 76 Ma the Samail Ophiolite overthrusts the continental lithosphere and is emplaced onto the craton, which are accreted at greenschist-facies conditions at the base of the Samail Ophiolite.
- The suprasubduction model: The obduction of an arc-trench gap ophiolite due to the collision of a volcanic arc and the continental margin (Fig. 2).In Figure 2-An oceanic lithosphere attached to the Arabian plate is subducting beneath the Neotethys plate. Due to the introduction of new material and from the effect of slab rollback, a volcanic arc is initiated and a new spreading ridge is formed. The ophiolite sequence is created during this phase. Figure 2-B shows the full creation of the volcanic arc and continued subduction pulls the arc closer. Figure 2-C shows the ophiolite sequence thrust, or abducted onto the Arabian plate margin. This model is supported by the chemical composition of the volcanic rocks of the ophiolite sequence. Island arcs volcanic rocks are depleted in heavy rare earth elements and enriched in light rare earth elements when compared to Mid ocean ridge basalts, and the Samail Ophilite is similar to other island arcs.
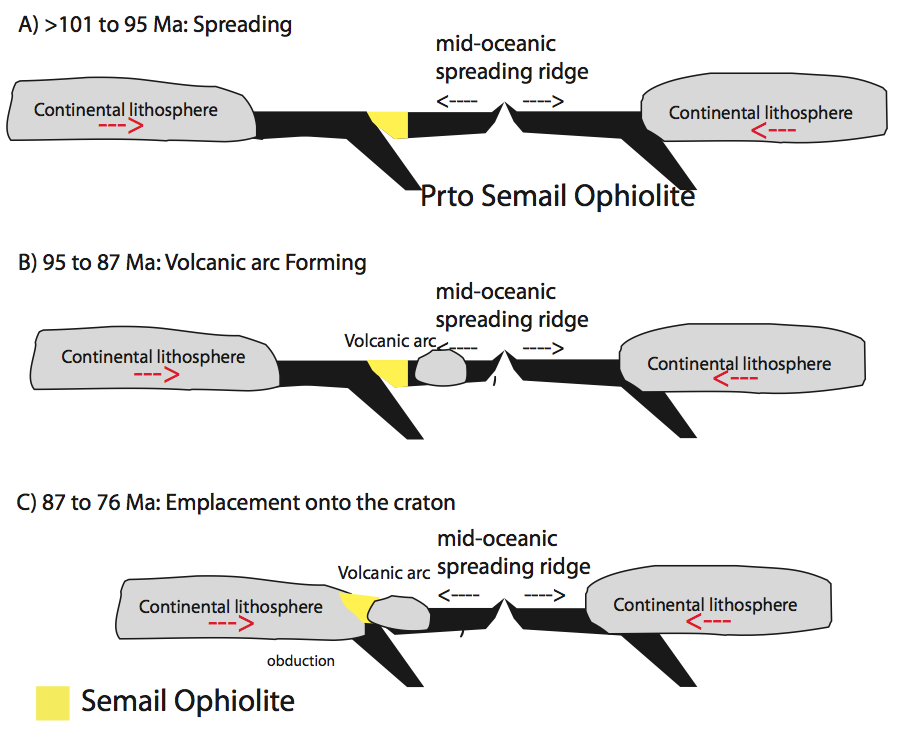
Fig 2: The suprasupduction model

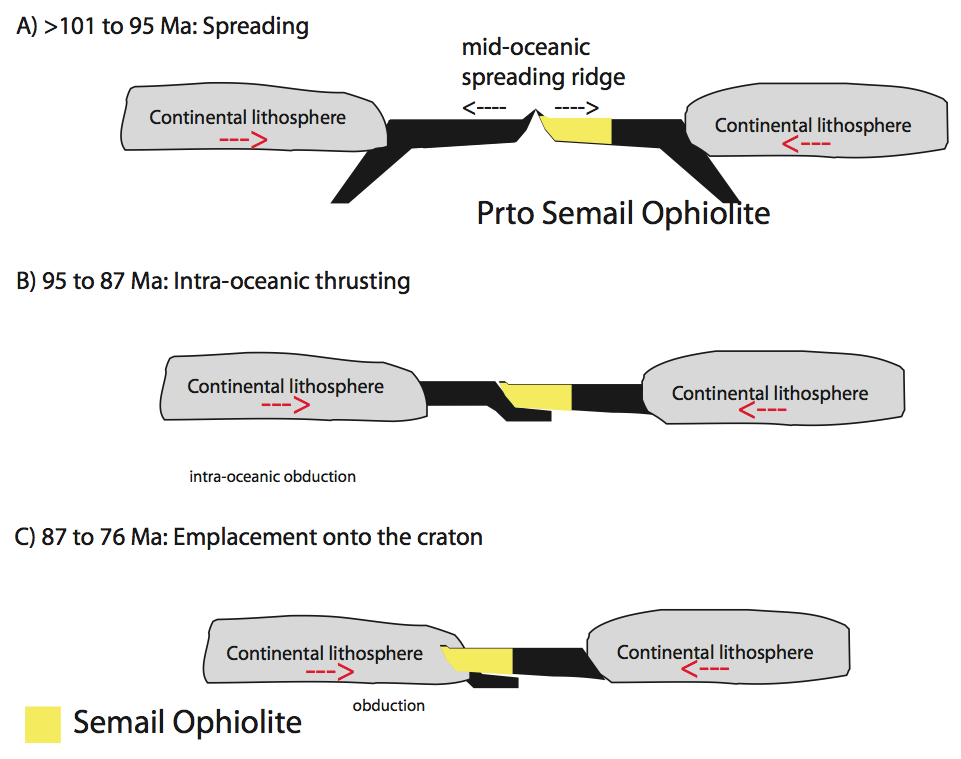
Fig 3: The obducting model
