= Edward Walpole (disambiguation) =

Edward Walpole was a politician.

Edward Walpole may also refer to:

- Edward Walpole (died 1668) (1621–1668), English politician and knight
- Edward Walpole (Jesuit) (1560–1637), an English Roman Catholic convert, who became known as a Jesuit missioner and preacher

== See also ==
- Walpole (surname)
