= Chilled margin =

Intrusive or volcanic rock texture

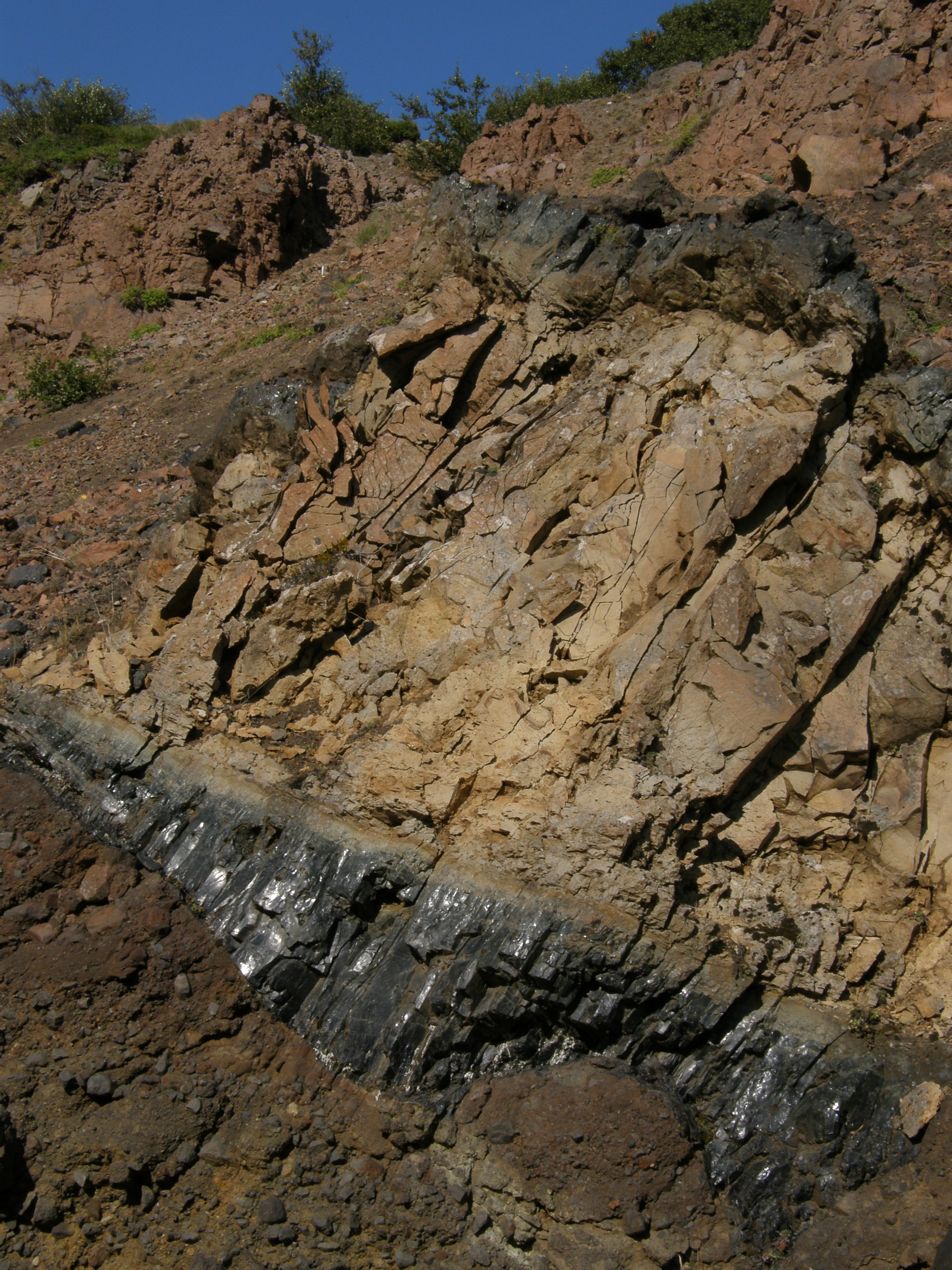
An igneous sheet intrusion in Iceland; lighter-colored rhyolite at its center with darker chilled margins of obsidian

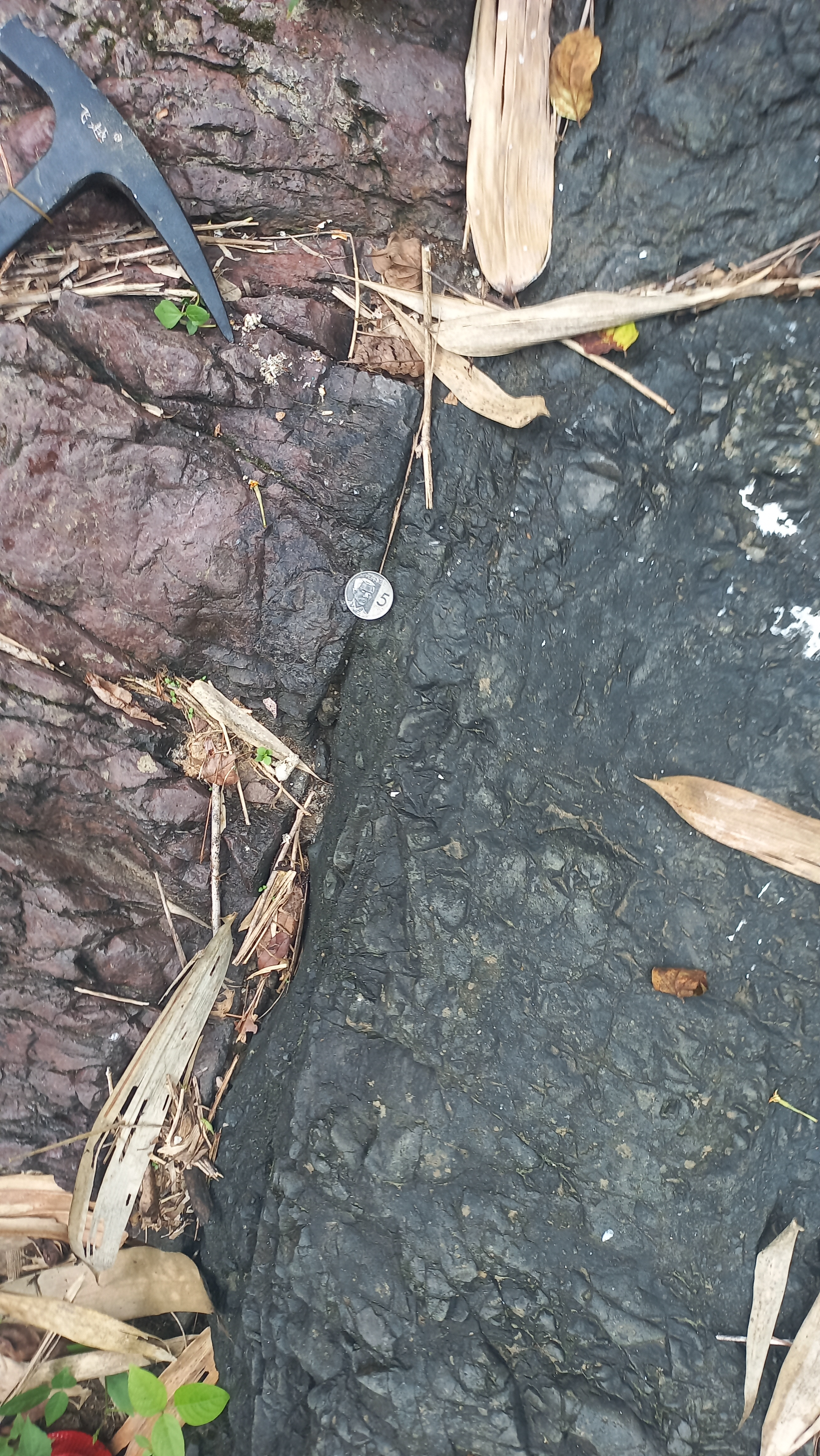
Chilled margin between a basalt dike and the trachyte (pinkish-brown rock) it intruded

A chilled margin is a shallow intrusive or volcanic rock texture characterised by a glassy or fine-grained zone along the margin where the magma or lava has contacted air, water, or particularly much cooler rock. This is caused by rapid solidification of the melt near the contact with the surrounding low temperature environment. In an intrusive case, the crystallized chilled margin may decrease in size or disappear by later remelting during magma flow, depending on magma heat flux.

The feature is often seen in dikes or sills, and especially in sheeted dike complexes, where multiple chilled margins are a distinctive feature.

Pillow lavas often show such chilled margins which are glassy and prove the sudden cooling undergone due to contact with water.
