= D'Entrecasteaux Ridge =

Double oceanic ridge in the south-west Pacific Ocean

Coordinates: 16°S 165°E

The d'Entrecasteaux Ridge connects the New Caledonia Ridge to the Vanuatu Trench
Approximate surface projection on Pacific Ocean of D'Entrecasteaux Ridge (DER) shaded in brown. Both the North d'Entrecasteaux Ridge and the South d'Entrecasteaux Chain are shown.

The d'Entrecasteaux (French pronunciation: [dɑ̃tʁəkasto]) Ridge (DER) is a double oceanic ridge in the south-west Pacific Ocean, north of New Caledonia and west of Vanuatu Islands. It forms the northern extension of the New Caledonia–Loyalty Islands arc, and is now actively subducting in the Vanuatu subduction zone under the Vanuatu/New Hebrides arc. The subduction of the DER is responsible for the anomalous morphology of the central part of New Hebrides arc whose movement more closely matches the north-east direction of the subducting Australian Plate (the rest of the New Hebrides arc rotate west in front of the southward expanding North Fiji Basin).

The name honours French naval officer Antoine Bruni d'Entrecasteaux, explorer of the south-west Pacific in the late 18th century.

== Geological setting ==
The DER extends north from the New Caledonia ridge to the New Hebrides/Vanuatu Trench and thus separates the North Loyalty Basin (4,500–5,000 m (14,800–16,400 ft) bsl) to the south from the West Santos Basin (5,400 m (17,700 ft) bsl) to the north. The DER has a western and an eastern part with distinct morphologies: the arcuate western part is an elongated graben flanked by two near-parallel horsts; the eastern part widens to the east where it has been described to split into a southern and northern ridge. These are separated by the Central d'Entrecasteaux Basin This has a smooth surface covered by sediments, which is deepening eastward to 4,000 m (13,000 ft) west of Santo Island.

The southern ridge is composed of 40 to 36 Ma-old extinct stratovolcanoes. Some have called it therefore the South d'Entrecasteaux Chain. It was considered to be a prolongation of the Loyalty Ridge by many, but this is questioned by reason of a 200 km (120 mi) gap between the westernmost South d'Entrecasteaux Chain seamount and the northernmost seamount in the Loyalty Ridge and the divergence in magnetic anomaly azimuths. It is a seamount chain on-top of a broad east–west-trending ridge. The seamounts, including the Sabine Bank which reaches 7 m (23 ft) bsl, are the volcanic remnants of an old island arc. A 4,000 m (13,000 ft)-deep scarp separates the southern ridge from the North Loyalty Basin to the south. The Bougainville Guyot, south of Santos, forms the eastern continuation of the seamount chain and is a Middle Miocene andesitic volcano, aged 40 ± 2 Ma, covered by Oligocene to Miocene lagoonal limestone.

The northern ridge, also known as the North d'Entrecasteaux Ridge, is a more continuous ridge, mostly more similar in composition to the Mariana fore-arc, forms part of an abandoned, north-facing oceanic trench which has been subducting under the New Hebrides island arc during the last 2–3 Ma. The northern DER reaches 2,350–2,100 m (7,710–6,890 ft) bsl. Its eastern part has had its basalts reinterpreted by modern compositional reanalysis as Eocene basalts that are primitive arc tholeiites between 21 and 38 Ma in age. Accordingly the eastern part of the DER is an abandoned plate boundary which was part of a south-dipping subduction zone before the Miocene.

A single dredged sample closest to the New Caledonia Nappe, as yet obtained, where the western part starts a curve that transitions to the eastern part, is of E-MORB back-arc basin-type composition and has an age of 49 ± 10 Ma. This western part of the DER, has an average depth of 3,500 m (11,500 ft), and is bounded to the north by a scarp. The western platform has experienced an Eocene compressional phase followed by Middle Miocene to Quaternary uplift and tilt, and indeed the next dredged sample to the north east has a poorly constrained age that is greater than 21 Ma and of primitive arc tholeiite composition consistent with subduction related formation.
