= George Walpole =

George Walpole may refer to:

- George Walpole, 3rd Earl of Orford (1730–1791), British administrator and peer
- George Walpole (British Army officer) (1758–1835), British soldier and politician
- George Henry Somerset Walpole (1854–1929), Anglican priest, teacher and author, Bishop of Edinburgh 1910–29

== See also ==
- Walpole (surname)
