= Sheeted dyke complex =

Series of parallel dykes characteristic of oceanic crust

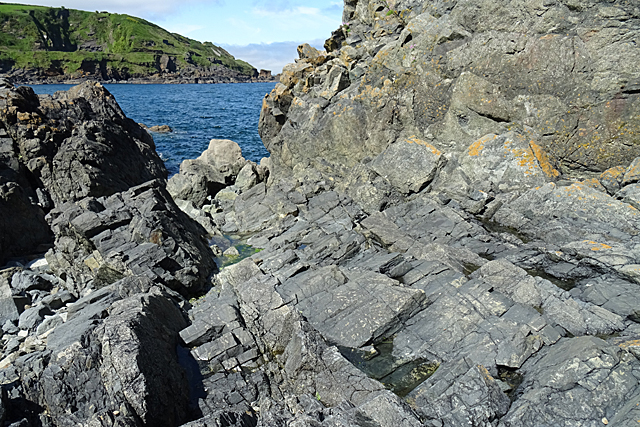
Sheeted dykes in exposed ophiolite (the Lizard complex in Cornwall, England)

A sheeted dyke complex, or sheeted dike complex, is a series of sub-parallel intrusions of igneous rock, forming a layer within the oceanic crust. At mid-ocean ridges, dykes are formed when magma beneath areas of tectonic plate divergence travels through a fracture in the earlier formed oceanic crust, feeding the lavas above and cooling below the seafloor forming upright columns of igneous rock. Magma continues to cool, as the existing seafloor moves away from the area of divergence, and additional magma is intruded and cools. In some tectonic settings slices of the oceanic crust are obducted (emplaced) upon continental crust, forming an ophiolite.

== Geometry ==
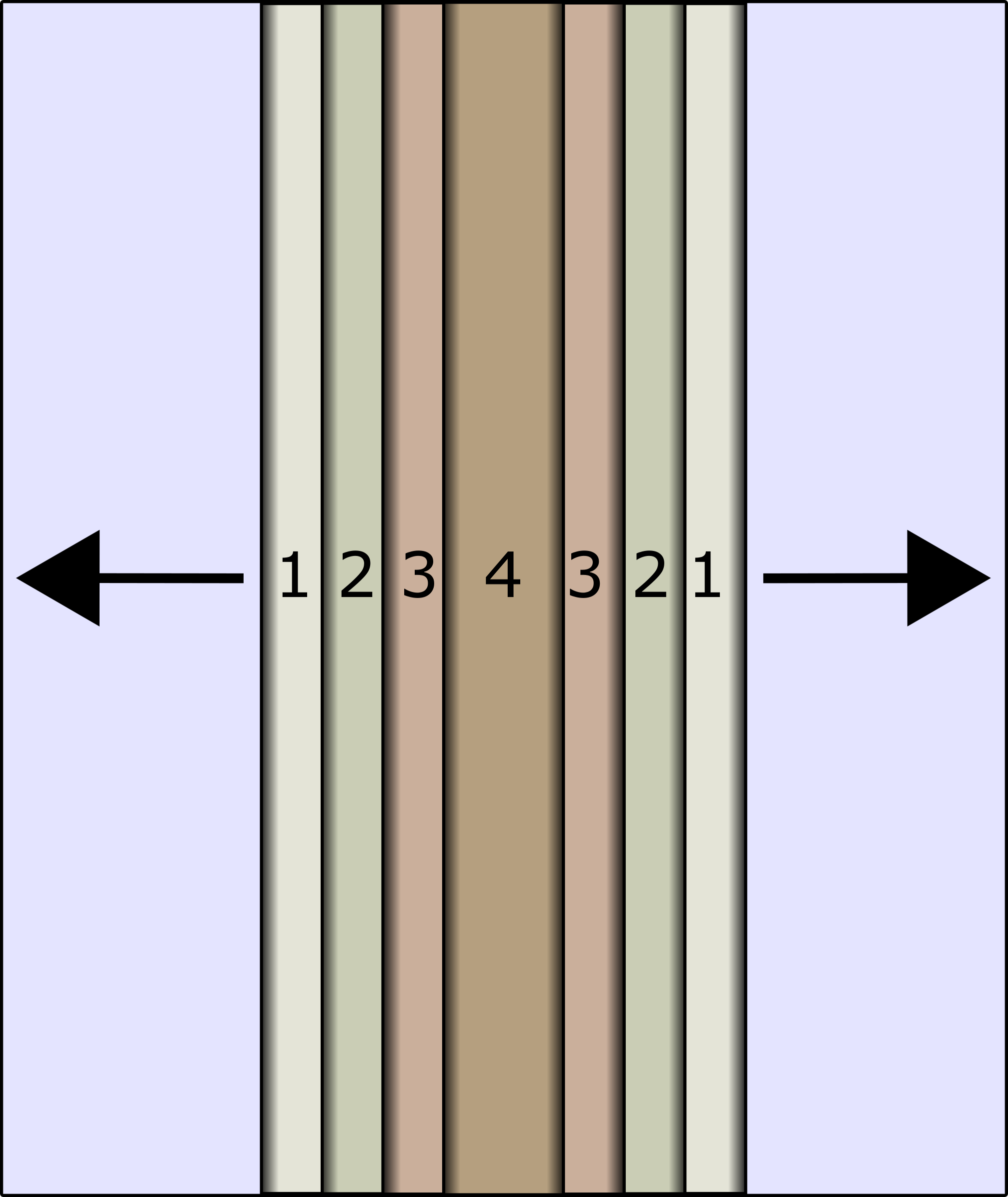
Cartoon to explain how one-sided chilled margins develop in sheeted dyke complexes from repeated intrusion at one location - four stages of intrusion are shown, with 1 being the earliest

The individual dykes typically range in thickness from a few centimetres to a few metres. Most of the dykes show evidence of one-sided chilled margins, consistent with most dykes having been split by later dykes. It is also common for the chilled margins to be consistently on one side, suggesting that most dykes in any one exposure were gradually moved away from the spreading centre by further stages of intrusion in a constant location.

The layer of sheeted dykes that makes up the lower part of Layer 2 of the oceanic crust is typically between one and two kilometres thick. At the top, the dykes become increasingly separated by screens of lava, while at the base they become separated by screens of gabbro.

== Dyke formation ==
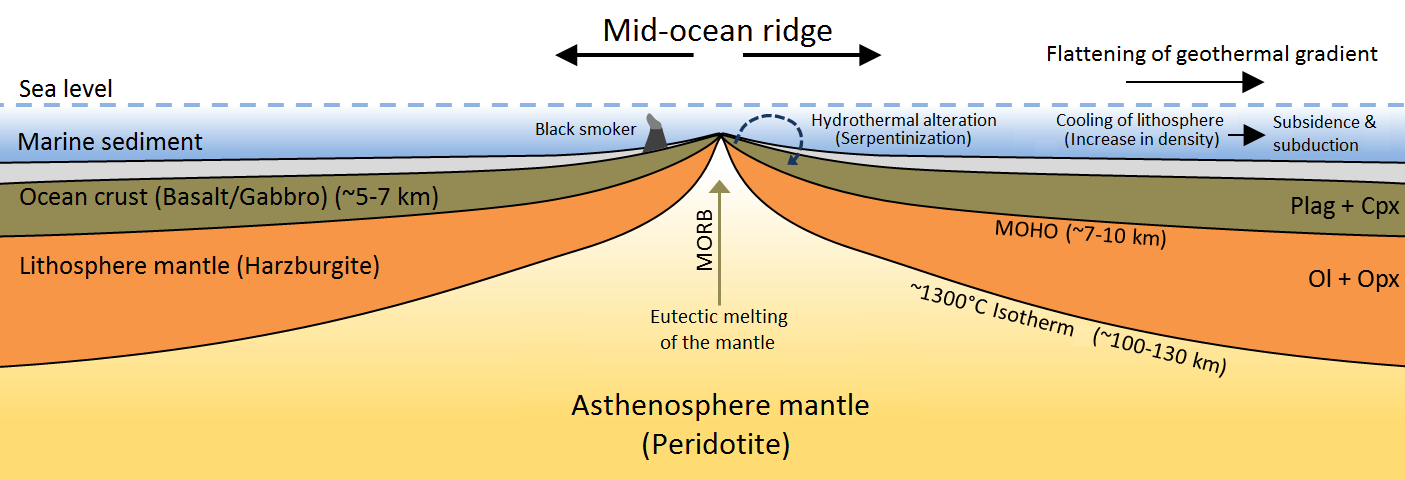
Magma rises through oceanic crust at mid-ocean ridges

Sheeted dyke complexes are most commonly found at divergent plate boundaries marked by the presence of mid-ocean ridges. These subaqueous mountain ranges are made up of newly created oceanic crust due to tectonic plates moving away from each other. In response to the separation of plates, magma from the asthenosphere is subject to upwelling, pushing hot magma up towards the seafloor. The magma that reaches the surface is subject to fast cooling and creates basaltic formations such as pillow lava, a common extrusive rock created near areas of volcanic activity on the seafloor. Although some magma is able to reach the surface of oceanic crust, a considerable amount of magma solidifies within the crust. Dykes are formed when the rising magma that does not reach the surface cools into upright columns of igneous rock beneath areas of divergence.

=== Ophiolites ===
Dykes are perpetually formed as long as magma continues to flow through the plate boundary, creating a distinct, stratigraphic-like sequences of rocky columns within the seafloor. Ophiolites are formed when these sections of oceanic crust are revealed above sea level and embedded within continental crust.

== Seafloor spreading and continental drift ==
(Top) Creation of rift valley due to low spreading rate. (Middle and bottom) Creation of mid-ocean ridges due to higher spreading rate.

The creation of sheeted dykes is a perpetual and continuous process that promotes the phenomenon known as seafloor spreading. Seafloor spreading is the creation of new oceanic crust by volcanic activity at mid-ocean ridges, and as magma continues to rise and solidify at mid-ocean ridges, the existing older dykes are pushed out of the way to make room for newer seabed. The rate at which new oceanic crust is created is referred to as spreading rate, and variations in spreading rate determine the geometry of the mid-ocean ridge being created at plate boundaries.

=== Fast-spreading ridges ===
Mid-ocean ridges with a spreading rate greater than or equal to 90 mm/year are considered to be fast-spreading ridges. Due to the large amounts magma being expelled from the asthenosphere in a relatively short period of time, these formations typically protrude much higher from the seafloor.

=== Slow-spreading ridges ===
Mid-ocean ridges with a spreading rate less than or equal to 40 mm/year are considered to be slow-spreading ridges. These formations are typically characterized by a large depression in the seafloor, known as rift valleys, and are formed due to the lack of magma present to solidify.

== Examples ==
- Troodos Ophiolite, Cyprus
- Maydan Syncline, Oman, part of the Semail Ophiolite - A sheeted dyke complex on the coast of Oman has been discovered to have been formed during a single sea-floor spreading episode.
- Hole 504b, Costa Rica - Hole 504b is a scientific ocean drilling program that burrowed 1562.3 m below the seafloor directly through layers of sediment exposing sheeted dykes and pillow lava.
