= Horatio Walpole =

Horatio Walpole may refer to:

- Horatio Walpole (died 1717) (1663–1717), MP for Castle Rising
- Horatio Walpole, 1st Baron Walpole (1678–1757)
- Horace Walpole, 4th Earl of Orford (1717–1797), author of The Castle of Otranto (1764)
- Horatio Walpole, 1st Earl of Orford (1723–1809)
- Horatio Walpole, 2nd Earl of Orford (1752–1822)
- Horatio Walpole, 3rd Earl of Orford (1783–1858)
- Horatio Walpole, 4th Earl of Orford (third creation) (1813–1894)
