= Walpole (1721 EIC ship) =

British East India Company ship

History

Great Britain
- Operator: East India Company
- Launched: 1721

General characteristics
- Tons burthen: 495 (bm)
- Complement: 99
- Armament: 32 guns

Walpole was a British East India Company (EIC) ship launched in 1721. She was named after English politician Robert Walpole and made four voyages to Asia.

== Career ==
The Walpole made four voyages to Asia. In the first, from 1721 to 1724, it sailed to Madras and Canton. The second, which lasted from 1727 to 1729, took it to Bengal and included an incursion in the Red Sea following the so-called Jeddah massacre of 1728. The third voyage, 1730-33, saw it again in Bengal and in the Red Sea. The track of the Walpole in the Red Sea was recorded on a portolan chart that is nowadays kept at the Royal Geographical Society. The fourth and final voyage took place between 1735 and 1737 and had Batavia and Canton as destinations.

Charles Boddam was the ship's captain throughout its entire career. After the demise of this Walpole, Captain Boddam transferred to a second ship that carried the same name, which was launched in 1738.
