= Robert Walpole (disambiguation) =

Robert Walpole (1676–1745) was the first prime minister of Great Britain.

Robert Walpole may also refer to:

- Robert Walpole (colonel) (1650–1700), member of parliament for Castle Rising, 1689–1700
- Robert Walpole, 2nd Earl of Orford (1701–1751), British peer
- Robert Walpole, 5th Earl of Orford (1854–1931), British peer, diplomat, soldier, and Royal Navy officer
- Robert Walpole (diplomat) (1736–1810), clerk of the Privy Council and ambassador to Portugal
- Robert Walpole (classical scholar) (1781–1856), English cleric and writer, son of the ambassador
- Robert Walpole (cricketer) (1768–1834), English amateur cricketer
- Robert Walpole (British Army officer) (1808–1876)
- Robert Walpole, 9th Baron Walpole (1913–1989), holder of Baron Walpole
- Robert Walpole, 10th Baron Walpole (1938–2021), British politician
- Robert Walpole, Irish producer of such films as Handsome Devil (2016)

== See also ==
- Walpole Vidal (Robert Walpole Sealy Vidal, 1853–1914), English footballer
