= Blue Ridge Ophiolite =

Blue Ridge Ophiolite is an ultramafic series of pods found in the Blue Ridge Mountains of the Appalachian mountain chain. The pods formed before the Taconic orogeny. Throughout the middle and late Ordovician period, the rocks were affected by regional metamorphism leading to resulting in altered mineralogy for some pods.

== Location ==
The Blue Ridge Ophiolite occurs frequently throughout the Appalachian Mountains. There are many pods located in the western parts of North Carolina such as the Newdale, Daybook, and Buck Creek Dunite. Some of these also pods extend into Tennessee and South Carolina.

== Mineralogy ==
The Blue Ridge Ophiolite can be broken up into two categories: altered and unaltered.

=== Unaltered ultramafic ===
The majority of the Blue Ridge Ophiolite has minimal altered composition of dunite. Forsterite is the main olivine endmember most consistently found in samples of the Blue Ridge Ophiolite. Other minerals found in noticeable amounts in the formation are orthopyroxene, clinopyroxene, and chromite. In rare cases garnets and plagioclase can be found in some samples. Unaltered samples of the Blue Ridge Ophiolite are green or brown. Samples tend to have a grainy texture like sugar, with conchoidal fracture. In thin section the most abundant and easiest to identify mineral is olivine, about 60% to 80% of the thin section.

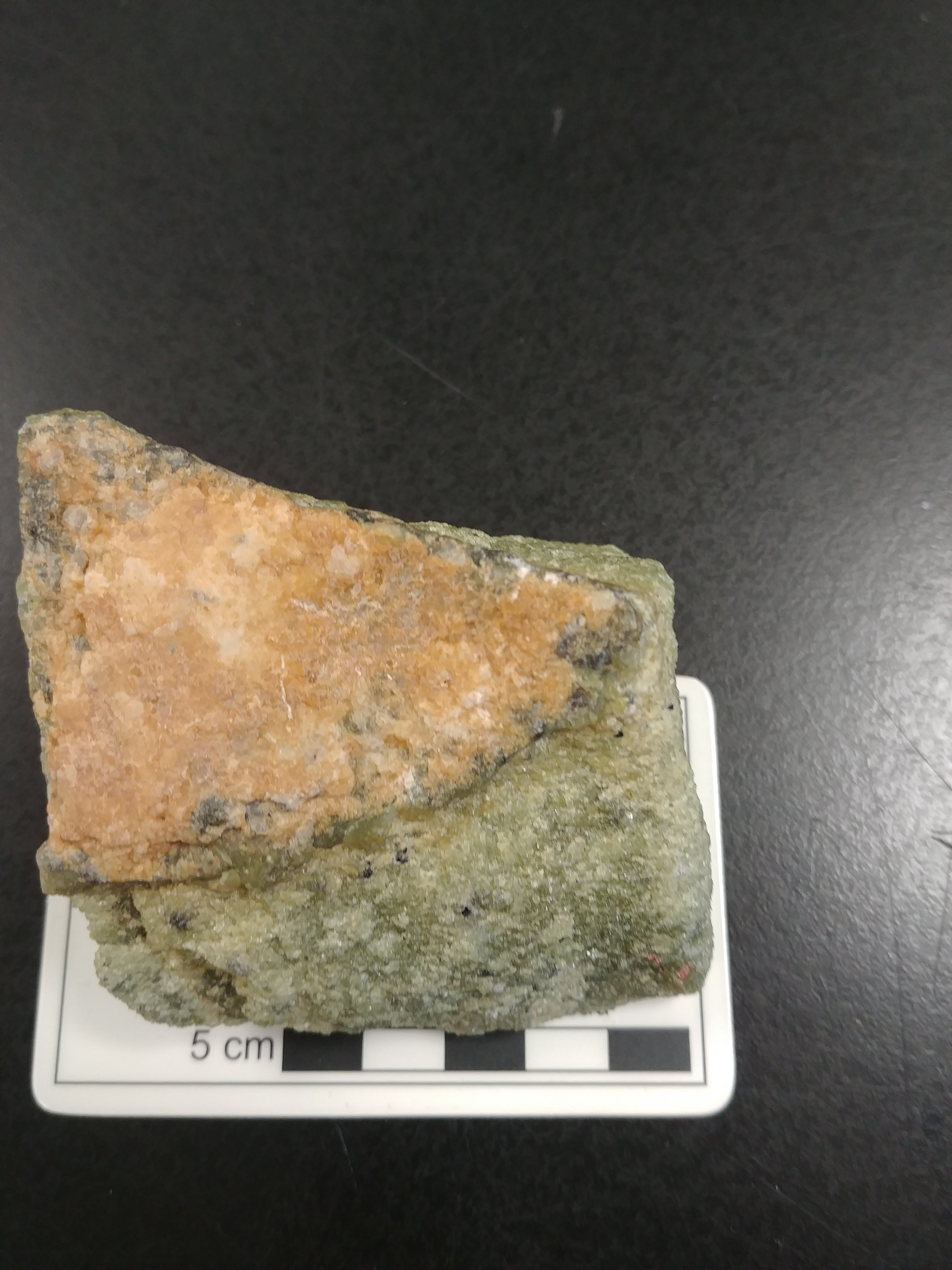
A sample of Newdale Dunite from Bandana, North Carolina. Sample taken by Loren Raymond

=== Altered ultramafic ===
The mineralogy of these pods of the Blue Ridge Ophiolite show evidence of metamorphism through their specific altered metamorphic mineralogy involving fluids. Minerals that appear in these rocks along with olivine are chlorite, talc, phlogopite, tremolite, and hornblende. Fluid and differential stress are major factors leading to the formation of metamorphic minerals in these rocks. When minerals like olivine are introduced to water they break down to form talc, and then through further alterations phlogopite can form. Through reworking, the minerals can form phyllite and other metamorphic textures. Altered samples of the Blue Ridge Ophiolite are green, with white and black crystals that are visible. In thin section some samples have no olivine such as the sample form Todd, North Carolina. Altered minerals that can be seen in thin section are chlorite and chromite.

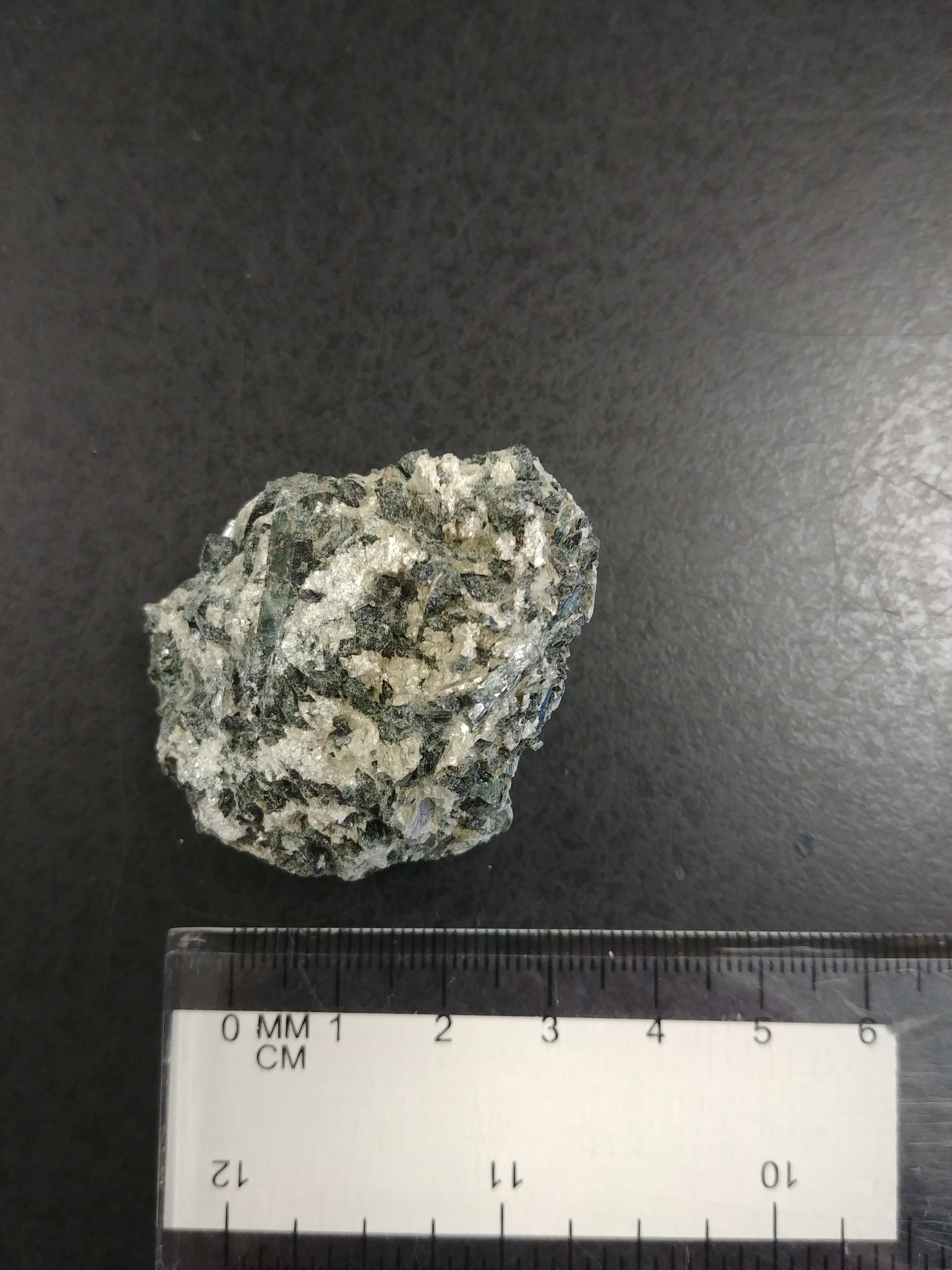
Sample of Talc-Actinolite Schist taken from Todd, North Carolina. Sample taken by Loren Raymond.

== Formation ==
Evidence points to the protolith being from a mid-ocean ridge mafic rock around the time of the Taconic orogeny. Early Ordovician tectonic activity is the cause of first metamorphism of ophiolite pods in what would later become the Blue Ridge Mountains. The oldest dated sample of the Blue Ridge Ophiolite at Buck Creek, North Carolina, is 458 million years old. These were dated using rhenium–osmium dating to determine the age. The use of examination of chromite in rock samples show deformation as far back as the early to middle Ordovician period. Middle Ordovician deformation caused other metamorphic suites in the Appalachian Mountains and buried and altered ophiolite pods throughout the region.
