= Walpole (1779 EIC ship) =

British East India Company ship

History

Great Britain
- Owner: Voyages 1-3: John Durand; Voyages:4-6 John Hodson Durand; Voyage 7: Robert Wigram
- Operator: East India Company
- Builder: Wells, Deptford
- Launched: 4 January 1779
- Fate: Sold in 1799 for breaking up

General characteristics
- Tons burthen: 774, or 77575/94 (bm)
- Length: Overall: 139 ft 9 in (42.6 m); Keel: 111 ft 10 1/2 in (34.1 m)
- Beam: 36 ft 1 in (11.0 m)
- Depth of hold: 15 ft 0 in (4.6 m)
- Complement: 1794: 110; 1798: 70
- Armament: 1794: 26 × 9&4-pounder guns; 1798: 20 × 9-pounder guns

Walpole was launched on the Thames in 1779. She made seven voyages for the British East India Company (EIC). On the sixth voyage, on her way to China, her captain discovered an island that he named Walpole Island. She was sold for breaking up in 1799.

== Career ==
1st EIC voyage (1779–1781): Captain Burnet Abercromby sailed from Portsmouth on 16 June 1779, bound for Madras and Bengal. Walpole reached the Cape on 10 October, and Madras on 17 January 1780. She arrived at Kedgeree on 12 March. Homeward bound, she sailed from Kedgeree on 1 December, and reached St Helena on 14 March. She stayed there until 29 July. She arrived at the Downs on 20 October.

2nd EIC voyage (1783–1784): Captain Henry Churchill sailed from Portsmouth on 10 March 1783, bound for St Helena, Bencoolen, and China. Walpole reached St Helena on 22 May, and Benkulen on 6 September. From Bencoolen she stopped at Manna on 1 October. She arrived at Whampoa Anchorage on 17 December. Homeward bound, Walpole crossed the Second Bar on 25 February 1784, reached St Helena on 14 June, and arrived at the Downs on 21 September.

3rd EIC voyage (1786–1788): Captain Churchill sailed from the Downs on 4 March 1786, bound for Madras, Bengal, and China. Walpole was at Madeira on 22 March, and Joanna on 13 July. She reached Madras on 9 August, but then sailed to Diamond Point, where she arrived on 23 August. Walpole sailed from Diamond Point on 24 December, and arrived at Cox's Island on 26 December. She sailed from Cox's Island on 14 January 1797, and returned to Madras on 31 January. She then sailed up to Kedgeree, where she arrived on 4 March. From Kedgeree she reached Madras on 13 May, and Penang on 12 July, on her way to China. Walpole arrived at Whampoa on 3 September. Homeward bound, she crossed the Second Bar on 19 January 1788, reached St Helena on 6 April, and arrived at the Downs on 24 June.

4th EIC voyage (1789–1790): Captain Churchill sailed from the Downs on 4 April 1789. Walpole reached Batavia on 24 July, and arrived at Whampoa on 24 September. Homeward bound, she crossed the Second Bar on 7 January 1790, reached St Helena on 31 March, and arrived at the Downs on 31 May.

5th EIC voyage (1792–1793): Captain Churchill sailed from the Downs on 29 April 1792, bound for China. She arrived at Whampoa on 14 September. Homeward bound, she crossed the Second Bar on 19 December, reached St Helena on 7 March 1793, and arrived at the Downs on 16 June.

Map that shows "the Track of the Walpole Eastindiaman, Captain Thomas Butler, 1794 from the Cape of Good Hope to Van Diemen's Land, and from thence to China"

6th EIC voyage (1794–1795): Captain Thomas Butler acquired a letter of marque on 28 April 1794. He sailed from Plymouth on 23 June, bound for China. Walpole reached the Cape on 10 September. From there Butler, near St Paull, left the fleet of Indiamen bound to China. He hoped to find a faster route. Walpole sailed through Bass Strait and then sailed north. She did not stop at Port Jackson. On his way to China, Butler discovered an island that he named Walpole Island, a name it has retained to the present. Walpole arrived at Whampoa on 8 January 1795. Homeward bound, she crossed the Second Bar on 27 March, reached Malacca on 26 April, and St Helena on 24 August. She arrived back at the Downs on 3 December.

7th EIC voyage (1798–1799): Captain Butler acquired a letter of marque on 20 February 1798. He sailed from Portsmouth on 24 March, bound for Madras and Bengal. Walpole reached the Cape on 5 June, and Bombay on 10 August. She reached Madras on 28 September, and Diamond Harbour on 29 October. Homeward bound, she left Diamond Harbour on 20 January 1799. She was at Colombo on 3 February, St Helena on 18 May, and arrived back at the Downs on 28 July.

== Fate ==
Walpole was sold in 1799 for breaking up.
