= Walpole Island (New Caledonia) =

Island in New Caledonia, France

Coordinates: 22°36′S 168°57′E

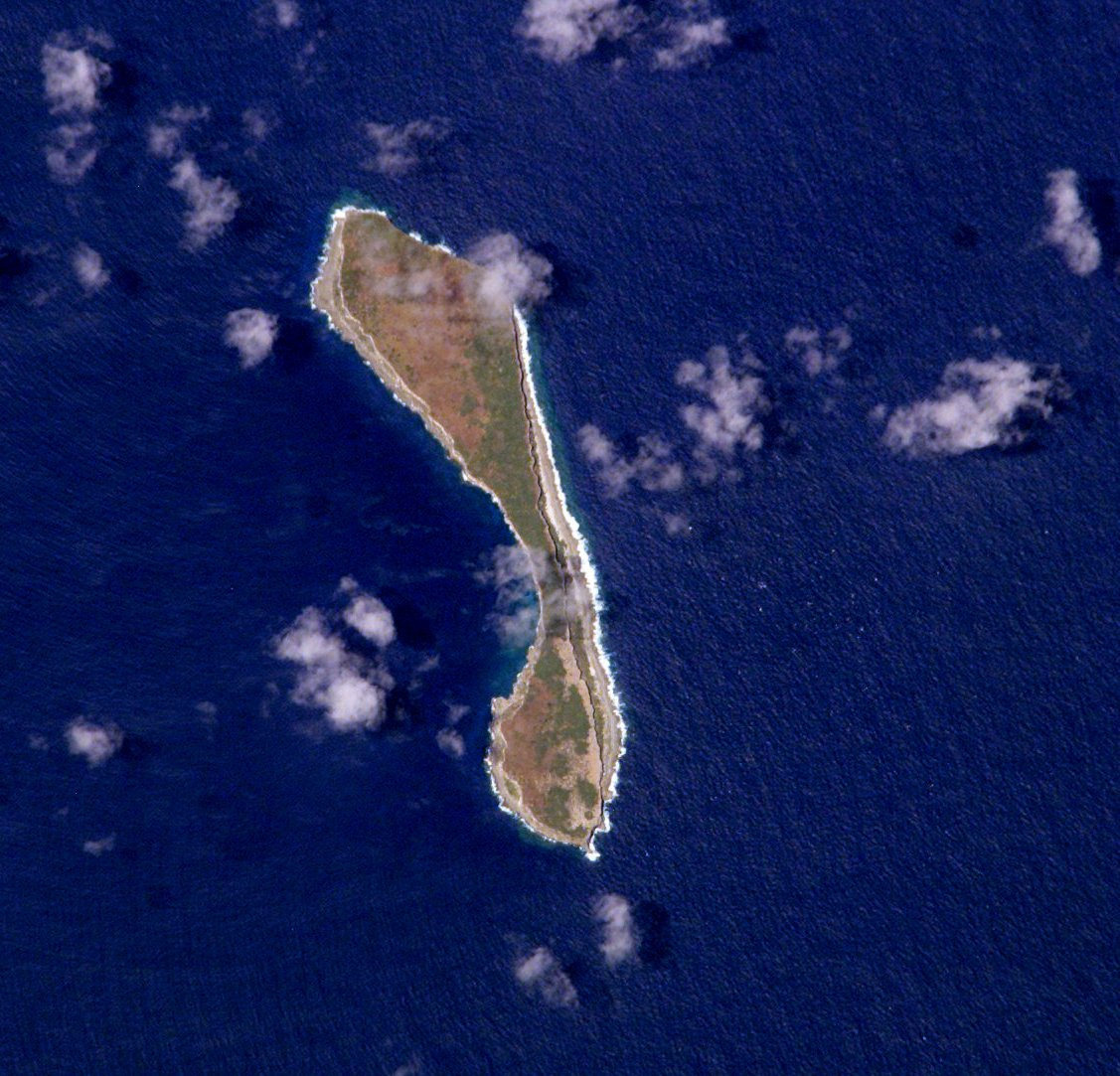
Walpole from the ISS

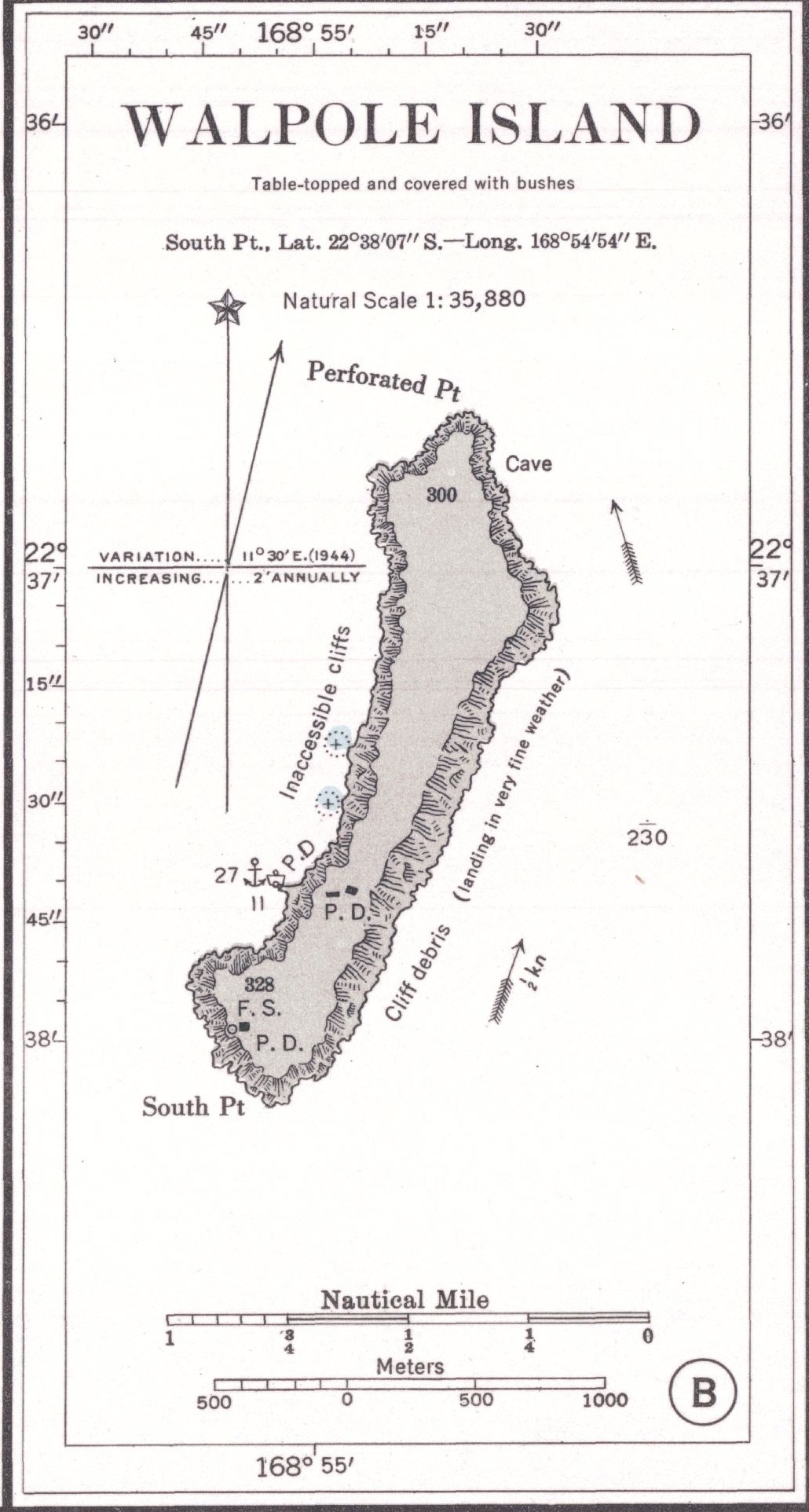
US Nautical Chart (1901)

Walpole Island (French: Île Walpole, Dehu: Walepool) is a small and uninhabited French island, 180 kilometres (95 nautical miles) east of New Caledonia in the South Pacific. Although it is geographically part of the Loyalty Islands, administratively it doesn't belong to any province or commune.

== History ==
There is evidence that the island had prehistoric inhabitants. Graves, shell and bone tools, as well as stone markers indicate the presence of a permanent population at some point. The island is the topic of several oral traditions from Maré and the Île des Pines, the two closest inhabited islands. Speculation amongst the overseers of the Guano mining operation suggested that shipwreck or other castaways had also occupied the island. British captain Thomas Butler is credited for discovery of the island in 1794, which he named after his ship Walpole.

From 1910 through 1936 guano was mined on the island. About 150,000 tonnes were exported to New Zealand.

The island is only visited by scientific naturalist research missions.

== Geography ==
As the easternmost island of the Loyalty Islands arc, Walpole is located 180 km (95 nmi) east of New Caledonia (168° 57' E, 22° 36' S). It is 4 km (2 1/2 mi) long north–south, and 0.5–1 km (5/16–5/8 mi) wide with an area of about 2.0 km^{2} (3/4 sq mi).

Walpole is a coral island of volcanic origin. During the last glaciation cycles, the island was submerged and rose several times, creating a coral capping. The island is bordered by eroding cliffs. On the eastern shore is a narrow plain. The island has no source of surface fresh water.

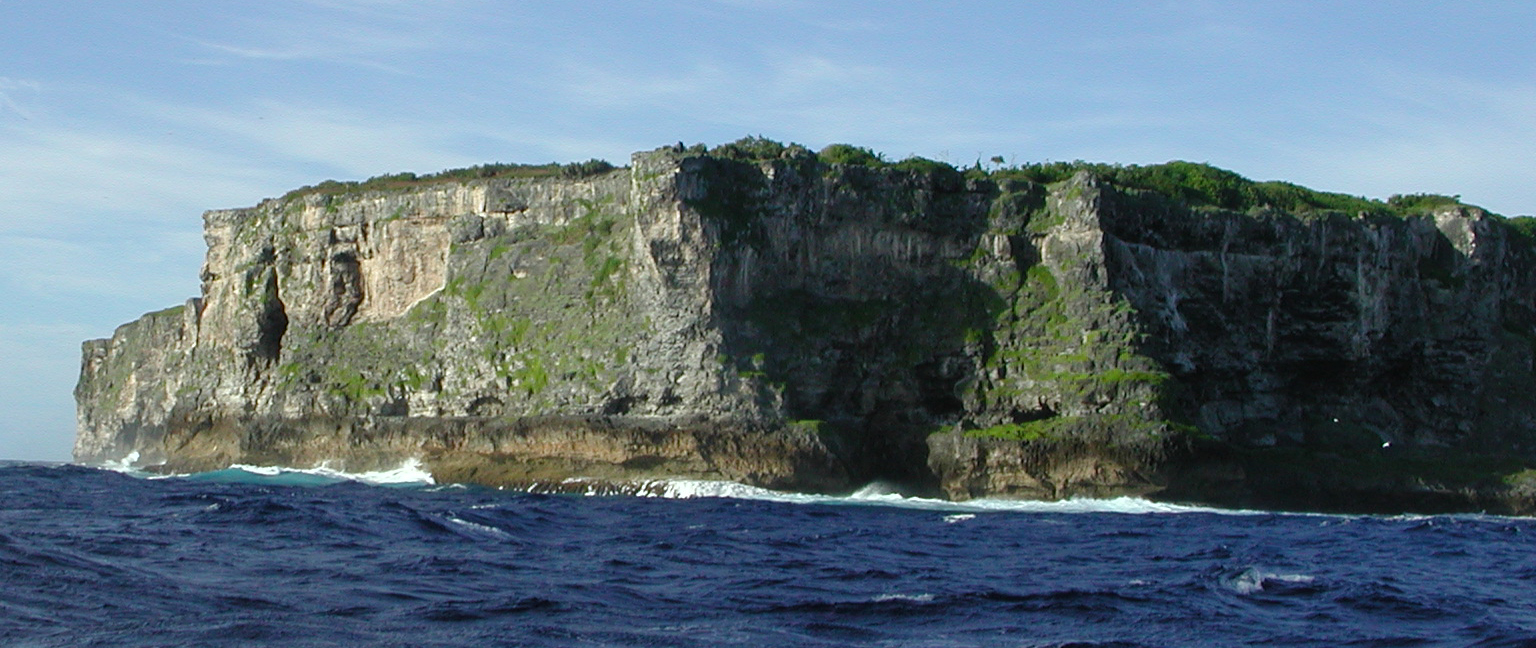
Walpole, windward east coast.

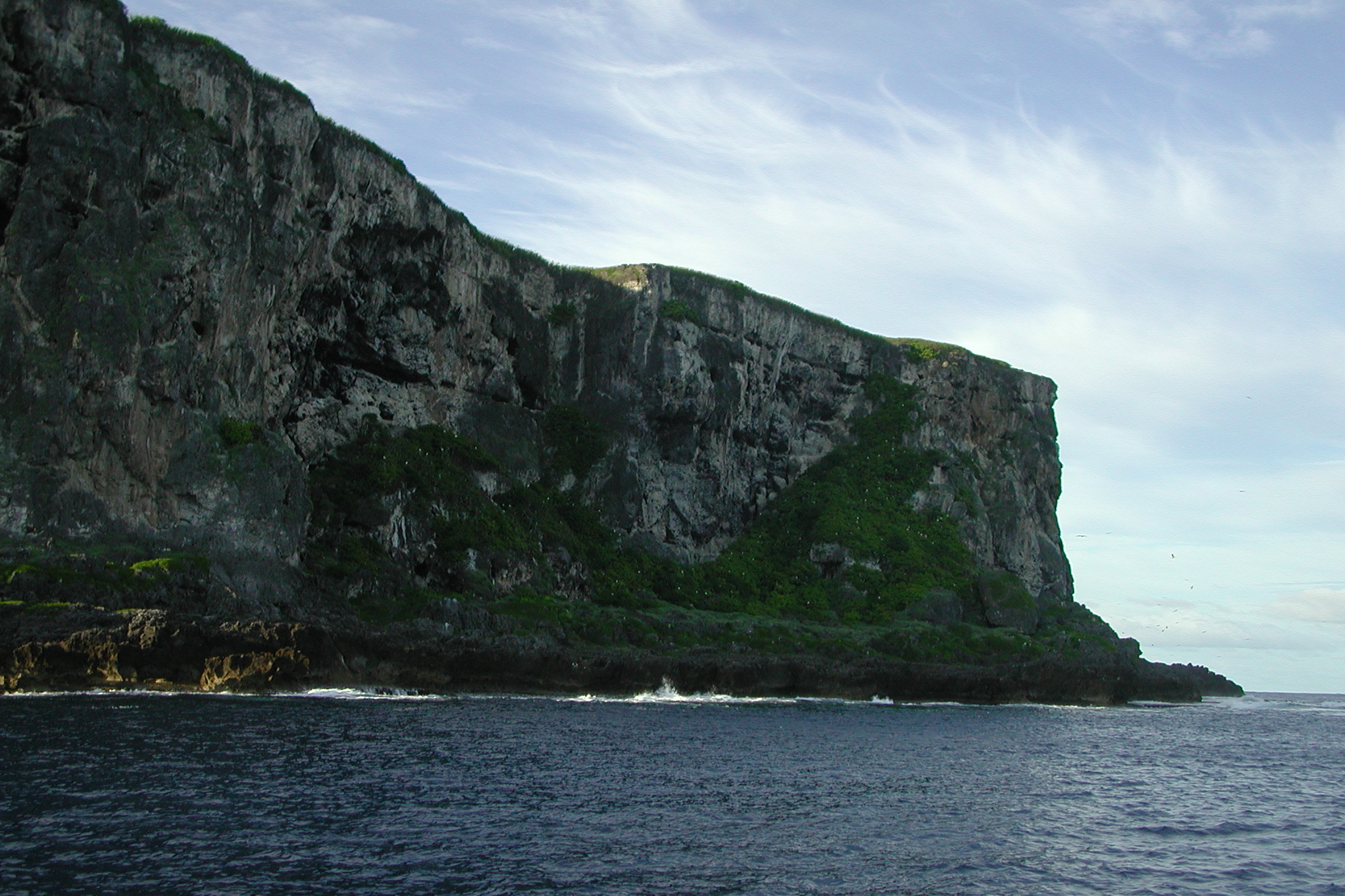
Walpole, leeward west coast.

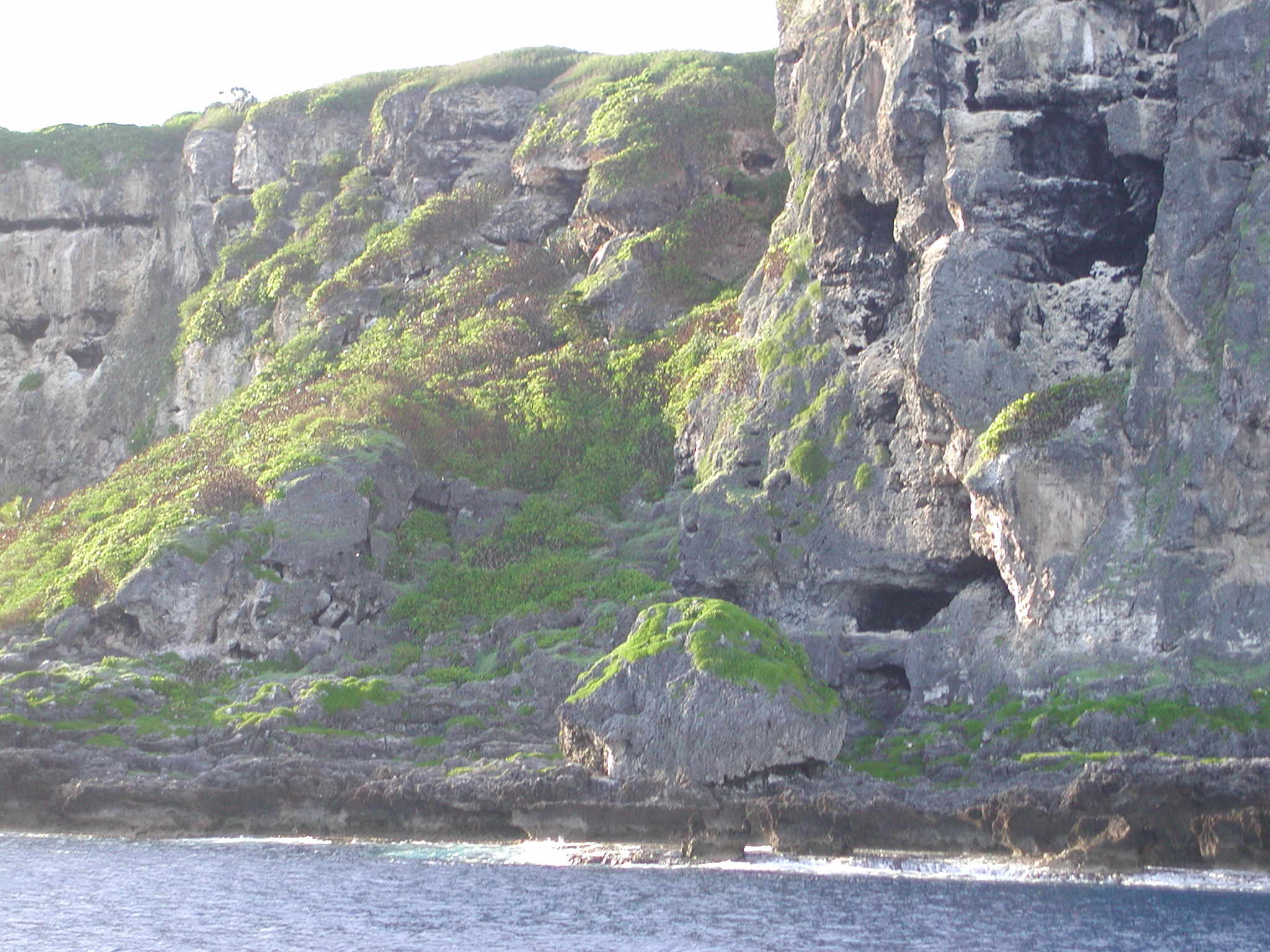
Walpole, west coast, fallen coral blocks.

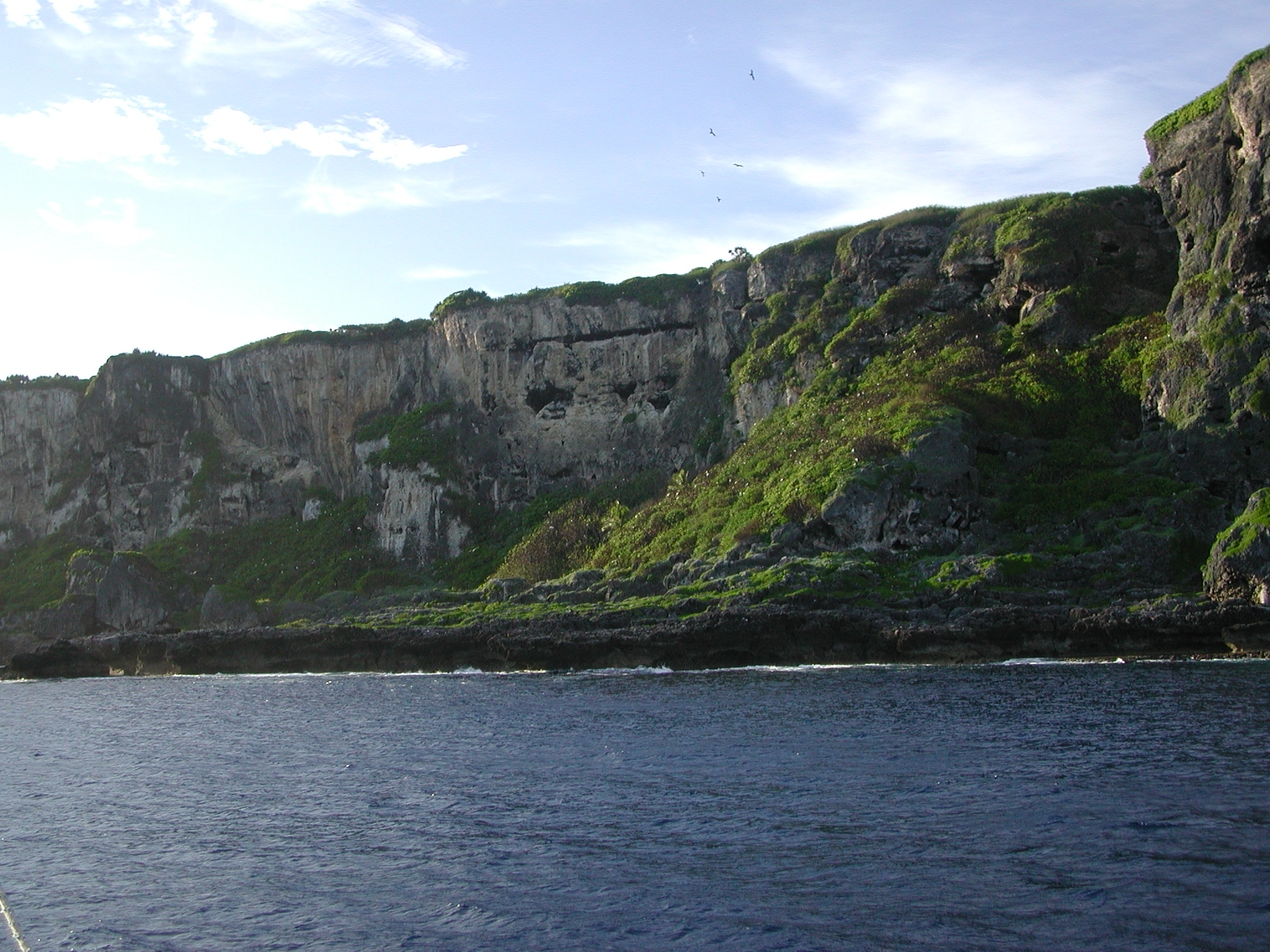
Walpole, leeward west coast, frigatebirds hovering.

== Important Bird Area ==
The island has been recognised as an Important Bird Area (IBA) by BirdLife International because it supports breeding populations of brown boobies, red-bellied fruit doves and Melanesian flycatchers.

== See also ==
- Desert island
- List of islands
