= Catherine Walpole =

First spouse of the prime minister of Great Britain

The Honourable Catherine, Lady Walpole
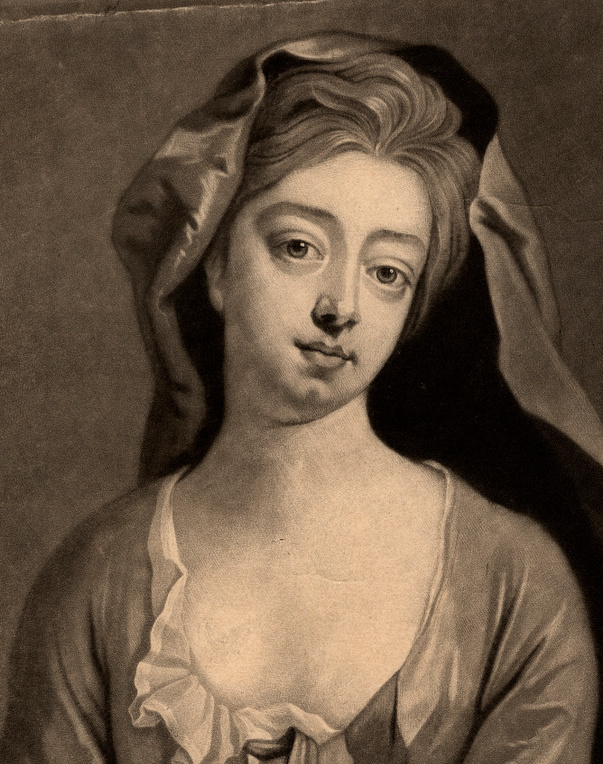
- Detail of mezzotint, c. 1748 – c. 1760
- Born: Catherine Shorter; 1682
- Died: 20 August 1737 (aged 54–55); Chelsea, London, England
- Resting place: St Martin at Tours' Church, Houghton
- Known for: Spouse of the prime minister of Great Britain (1721–1737)
- Spouse: Sir Robert Walpole (m. 1700)
- Children: 6; including Robert, Edward and Horace
- Relatives: Walpole family

Catherine, Lady Walpole (née Shorter; 1682 – 20 August 1737) was the first wife of the first British prime minister Sir Robert Walpole.

== Origins ==
She was a daughter of Sir John Shorter, of Bybrook, in Kent, a wealthy merchant (the son of Sir John Shorter, Lord Mayor of London), by his wife Elizabeth Philipps, a daughter of Sir Erasmus Philipps, 3rd Baronet. Her sister Charlotte Shorter became the third wife of Francis Seymour-Conway, 1st Baron Conway, and was the mother of Francis Seymour-Conway, 1st Marquess of Hertford.

== Life ==
In 1700, she married Sir Robert Walpole of Houghton Hall in Norfolk, the first British prime minister, to whom she brought a dowry of £20,000. She was renowned for her extravagant lifestyle, frequently attending the opera and buying expensive clothes and jewellery. The couple became estranged during his premiership, and he had a succession of mistresses. He lived with Maria Skerrett at both Richmond, Surrey, and at Houghton while Lady Walpole was still alive. She aroused controversy when it was noted that her youngest son Horace Walpole, born 10 years after his siblings, did not resemble in looks any of his siblings or his supposed father. Lady Walpole's lover at that time was reported to be Carr Hervey, Lord Hervey (1691–1723), the son of John Hervey, 1st Earl of Bristol.

== Children ==
Catherine and Robert Walpole had six children.

- Robert Walpole, 2nd Earl of Orford (1701 – 31 March 1751); married Margaret Rolle (17 January 1709 – 13 January 1781), later the 15th Baroness Clinton, on 26 March 1724 and had one son.
- Katherine Walpole (13 May 1703 – 22 October 1722); died unmarried at Bath, Somerset.
- Horatio Walpole (1704 – 24 July 1704)
- Mary Walpole (c. 1706 – 2 January 1732); married George Cholmondeley, 3rd Earl of Cholmondeley, on 14 September 1723, and had two sons.
- Sir Edward Walpole (c. 1706 – 12 January 1784); died unmarried, but had four illegitimate children with Dorothy Clement, three of whom were daughters. Laura, the eldest, married Bishop Frederick Keppel. The second daughter, Maria Walpole (d. 1807), married, firstly, James Waldegrave, 2nd Earl Waldegrave; and, secondly, Prince William Henry, Duke of Gloucester and Edinburgh, brother of King George III. Edward's son, also named Edward, was born in 1737 and died in 1771 without issue. The youngest daughter, Charlotte, was wife of Lionel Tollemache, 5th Earl of Dysart.
- Horace Walpole, 4th Earl of Orford (1717–1797)

She is buried at the Church of St Martin on the Walpole estate at Houghton in Norfolk, England. She has a memorial plaque at Westminster Abbey.
