= Walpole Immaculate Conception =

Painting by Bartolomé Esteban Murillo

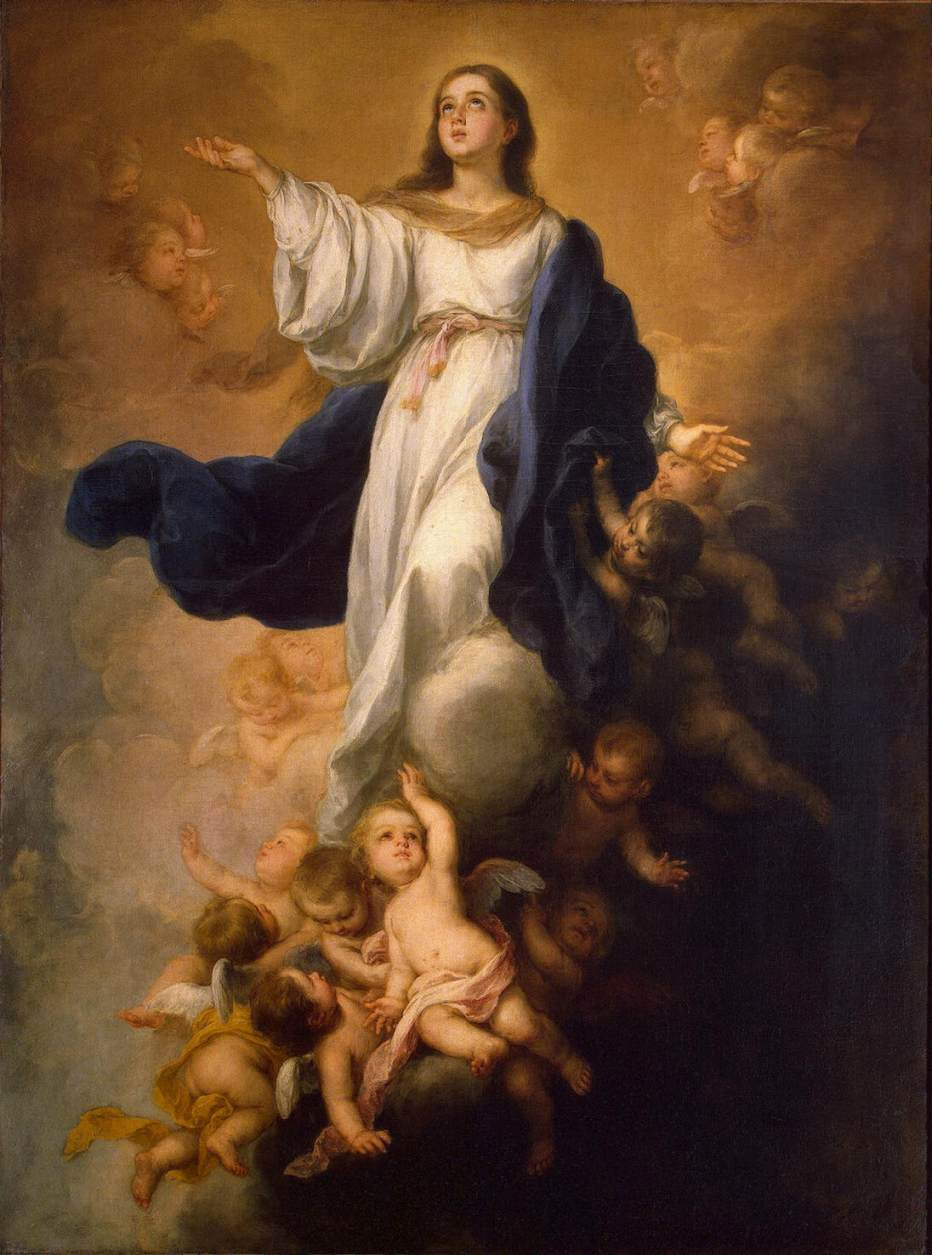
Walpole Immaculate Conception (c. 1680) by Bartolomé Esteban Murillo

The Walpole Immaculate Conception is an oil on canvas painting by Spanish painter Bartolomé Esteban Murillo, from c. 1680. It is named after English politician Robert Walpole, having formed part of his collection at Houghton Hall. It was acquired by Catherine the Great in 1779 with the rest of that collection and is now in the Hermitage Museum in Saint Petersburg.

It was loaned back to Houghton Hall in 2013.
