= Maria, Lady Walpole =

Second wife of Robert Walpole

Heraldic ceiling at Strawberry Hill House: at the ten o'clock position is Or, a chief indented sable, arms of the Skerrit family of Whitchurch, Devon. Maria was stepmother to the builder of the house, Horace Walpole.

Maria, Lady Walpole (née Skerret, also spelled Skerritt, Skerrett; 1702 – 4 June 1738) was the second wife of British politician and Prime Minister Robert Walpole from before 3 March 1738 until her death in childbirth (miscarriage) three months later. She was buried in Church of St Martin on the Walpole estate at Houghton Hall in Norfolk, England.

== Biography ==
Lady Walpole was the only known daughter of Thomas Skerret, a wealthy London merchant. Upon her marriage to Walpole in 1738, she paid a dowry of £30,000.

Walpole had become estranged from his first wife, Catherine, and took a series of mistresses. Maria Skerret was a long-term companion (1723–1738); they lived together in both Richmond and Houghton Hall in Norfolk while Walpole's first wife was still alive. Skerret was received everywhere and moved in fashionable society. She was even alluded to as Polly in The Beggar's Opera written in 1728 by John Gay, in which 'Macheath' was Walpole.

Lady Walpole was also often mentioned in the letters of Lady Mary Wortley Montagu as 'Molly'. "I see every body but converse with nobody but 'des amies choisies'; in the first rank of these are Lady Stafford and dear Molly Skerritt, both of whom have now the additional merit of being old acquaintances, and never having given me any reason to complain of either of 'em."

Walpole was created Earl of Orford after he retired from the premiership in 1742, and he used his influence with King George II to have his illegitimate daughter by Lady Walpole, Maria, granted the rank and precedence of an earl's daughter, so she became "Lady Maria Walpole". Their daughter Maria was born in 1725. She later married Colonel Charles Churchill of Chalfont, with whom she had two daughters.

== Styles ==
- Miss Maria Skerritt (1702–1738)
- Maria, Lady Walpole (1738–1738)

== See also ==
- Spouses of the Prime Ministers of the United Kingdom

== Sources ==
- The genealogy of 750,000 people connected to European Royalty, Ee-familytree.net. Accessed 23 September 2017.

=== Citations ===
- Charles Mosley, editor, Burke's Peerage, Baronetage & Knightage, 107th edition, 3 volumes (Wilmington, Delaware, U.S.A.: Burke's Peerage (Genealogical Books) Ltd, 2003), volume 3, page 4059.

Unofficial roles
Preceded by The 1st Lady Walpole	Spouse of the Prime Minister of Great Britain; 3 March 1738 – 4 June 1738	Vacant Title next held by Lady Catherine Pelham
