= West Rudham =

Civil parish in Norfolk, England

Coordinates: 52.8167°N 0.7°E

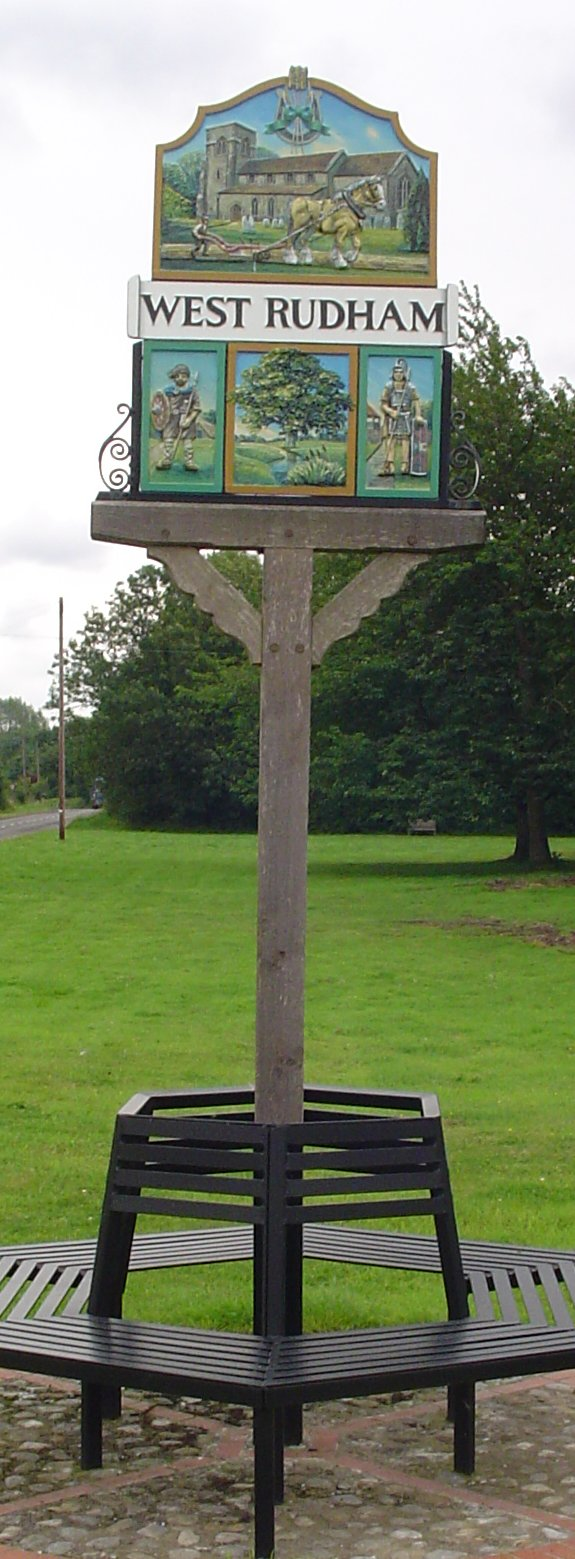
- Signpost in West Rudham

- Location within Norfolk
- Area: 11.81 km^{2} (4.56 sq mi)
- Population: 288 (2011)
  - Density: 24/km^{2} (62/sq mi)
- OS grid reference: TF820277
- Civil parish: West Rudham
- District: King's Lynn and West Norfolk
- Shire county: Norfolk
- Region: East
- Country: England
- Sovereign state: United Kingdom
- Post town: KING'S LYNN
- Postcode district: PE31
- Police: Norfolk
- Fire: Norfolk
- Ambulance: East of England

West Rudham is a civil parish in the English county of Norfolk. The village straddles the A148 King's Lynn to Cromer road. It covers an area of 11.81 km^{2} (4.56 sq mi) and had a population of 213 in 97 households at the 2001 census, the population including Houghton and increasing to 288 at the 2011 census. For the purposes of local government, it falls within the district of King's Lynn and West Norfolk.

West Rudham also includes the village of Pockthorpe.

== History ==
The villages name means 'Rudda's homestead/village' or 'Rudda's hemmed-in land'. There is evidence of occupation during the Middle Ages. In 2016, archaeological test pits were dug. The report was published in 2019.
