= Walpole collection =

Art collection

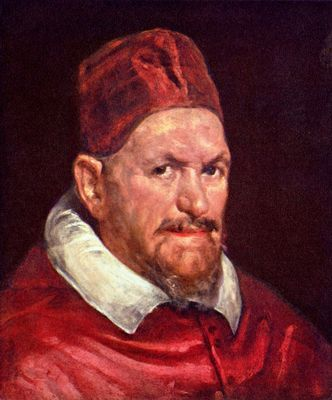
Head of Pope Innocent X after Velazquez, now in the National Gallery of Art, Washington

The Walpole collection was a collection of paintings and other works of art at Houghton Hall in Norfolk and at other residences of Sir Robert Walpole. Many of the important works were sold in 1779 to Catherine the Great of Russia, and the Hermitage Museum still owns more than 120 works from the collection.

== Origin ==
The collection was put together by Sir Robert Walpole, Britain's first prime minister, and housed at Houghton Hall and his other residences. It included paintings by Anthony van Dyck, Nicolas Poussin, Peter Paul Rubens, and Rembrandt, as well as a number of portraits of family members. Many of the portraits and some of the other paintings came from the collection of the Wharton family which Walpole reputedly bought for £1500. These included royal portraits and family portraits by Peter Lely and van Dyck (such as the double portrait of Philadelphia and Elisabeth Wharton). Walpole bought the complete collection, most of which went to Houghton, but a few of which were sold. Walpole's sons were active in obtaining works for his collection. He also received gifts from friends and from those seeking support or honours.

Walpole's collection of marble Roman busts was also noteworthy and the collection included a pair of silver wine coolers by William Lukin that are now in the Metropolitan Museum of Art, New York.

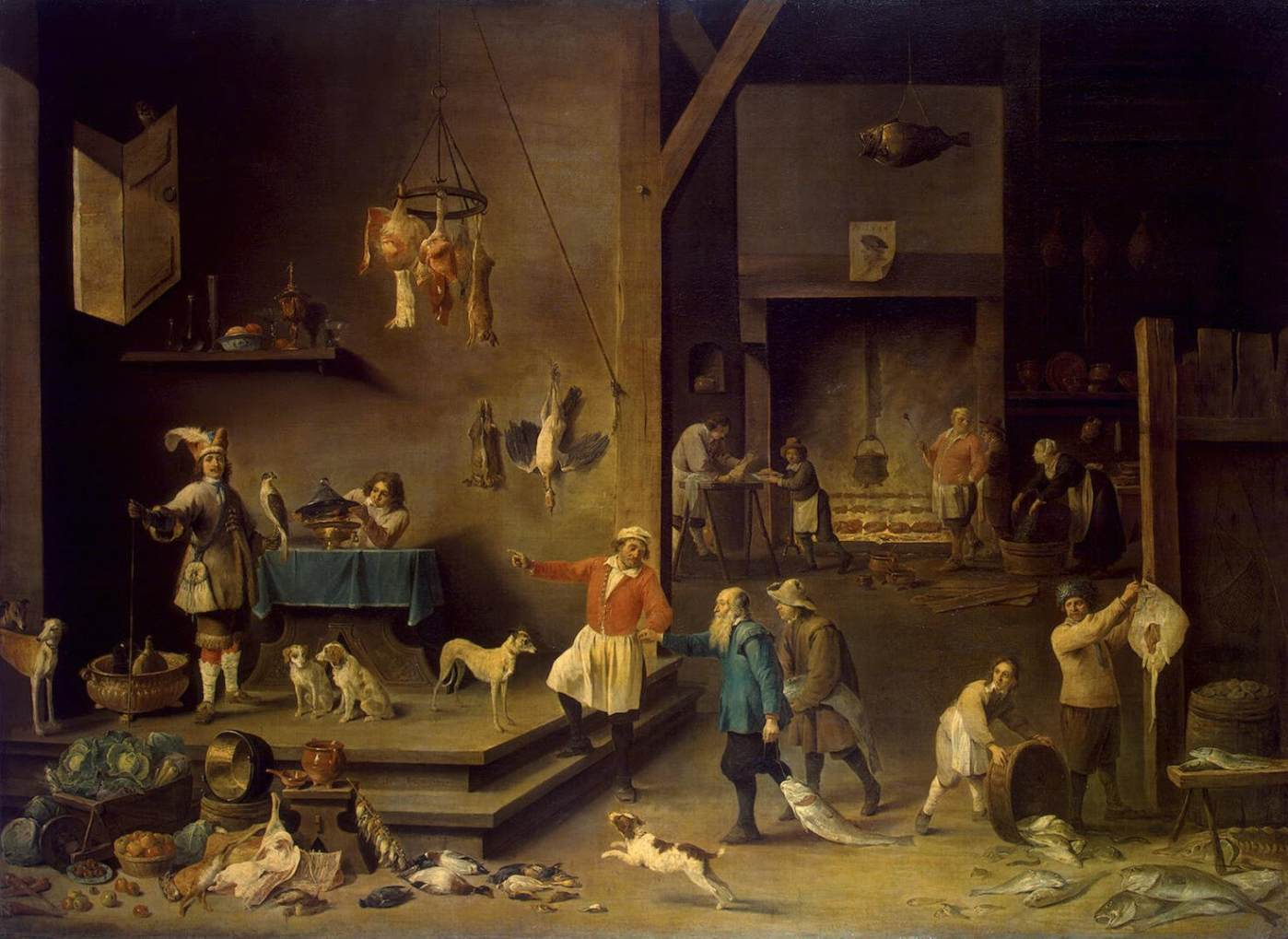
The Kitchen by David Teniers II, now in the Hermitage Museum

Horace Walpole, son of Sir Robert, published a catalogue of the collection in 1736.

== The collection after Walpole's death ==
Following the death of Robert Walpole, 2nd Earl of Orford, in 1751, "a lesser part of the collection" was sold at auction by George Walpole, 3rd Earl of Orford.

In 1777, John Wilkes tried (but failed) to persuade parliament to buy the collection for the nation. Many of the Old Master paintings subsequently went to the Hermitage Museum having been sold by the 3rd Earl to Catherine the Great in 1779 for £40,550 (equivalent to £5,829,994 in 2023).

In total 206 works travelled from Houghton to the Hermitage. Many of these remain in the Hermitage, but some subsequently passed to other Russian museums. Some items from the collection were sold in 1853, including a portrait of Joseph Carreras by Sir Godfrey Kneller which returned to Houghton Hall. Further sales took place in the 1930s. During the 2nd World War, the collection was stored for protection in Sverdlovsk. The collection returned to the Hermitage in 1946 and it still owns 127 works from the collection.

Some works remained at Houghton after the sale to Catherine including Thomas Gainsborough's oil painting of his own family -- Thomas Gainsborough, with His Wife and Elder Daughter, Mary (circa 1751–1752).

From September 2002 to February 2003 34 pictures from the collection were displayed at the Hermitage Rooms of Somerset House, on loan from the Hermitage Museum.

From 17 May 2013, until 24 November 2013, 70 pictures from the Hermitage and other museums that were part of the collection were loaned to Houghton Hall to be exhibited in their original settings.

== Some pictures from the collection ==
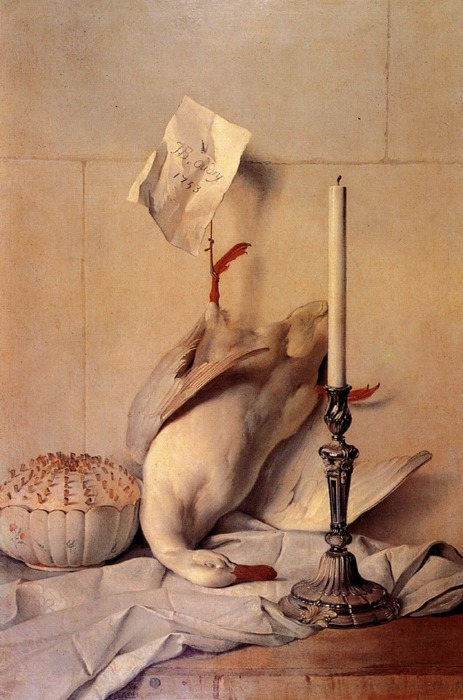
Jean-Baptiste Oudry's The White Duck, which was stolen from Houghton Hall in 1990

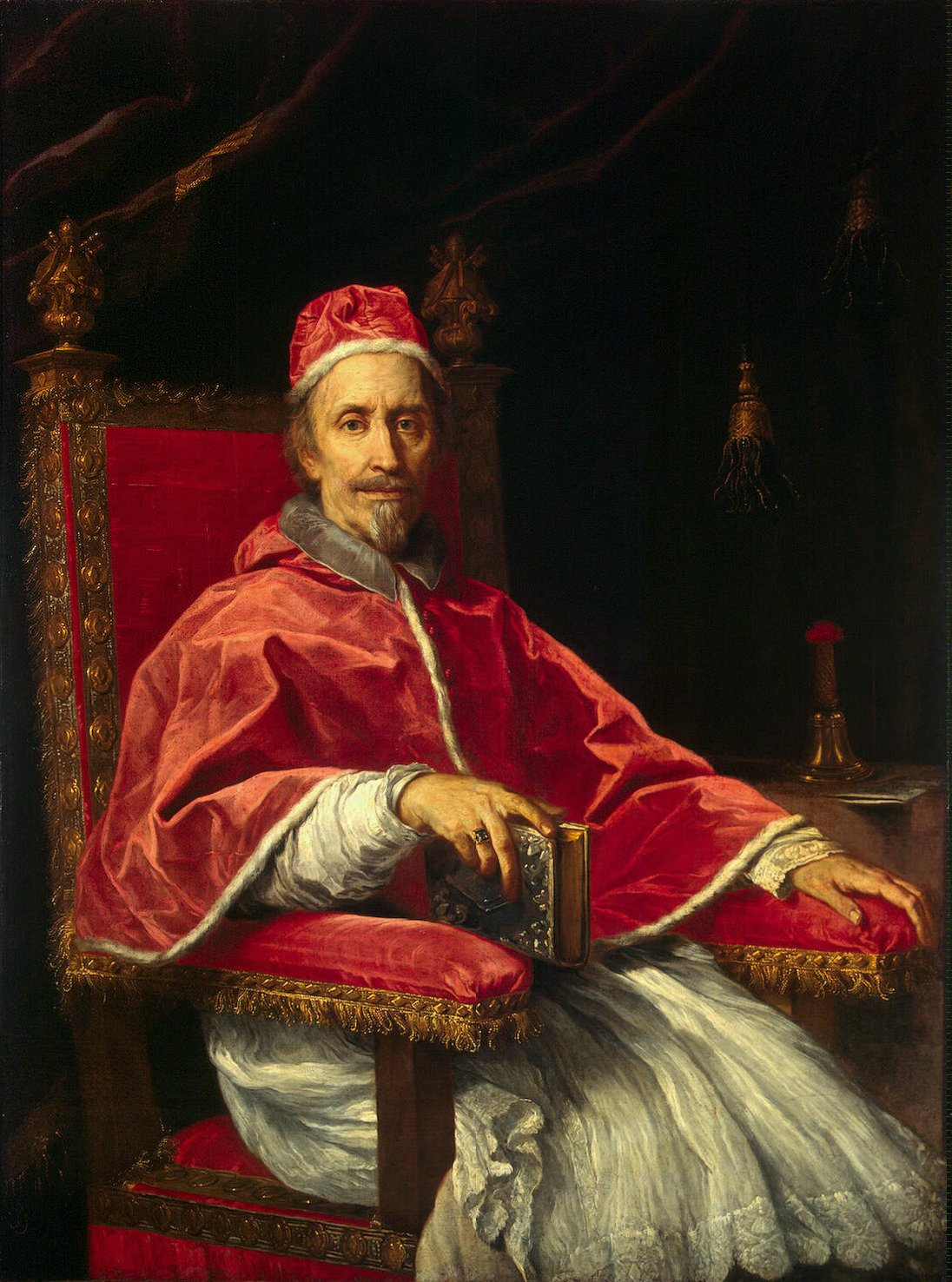
Pope Clement IX by Carlo Maratta, now in the Hermitage

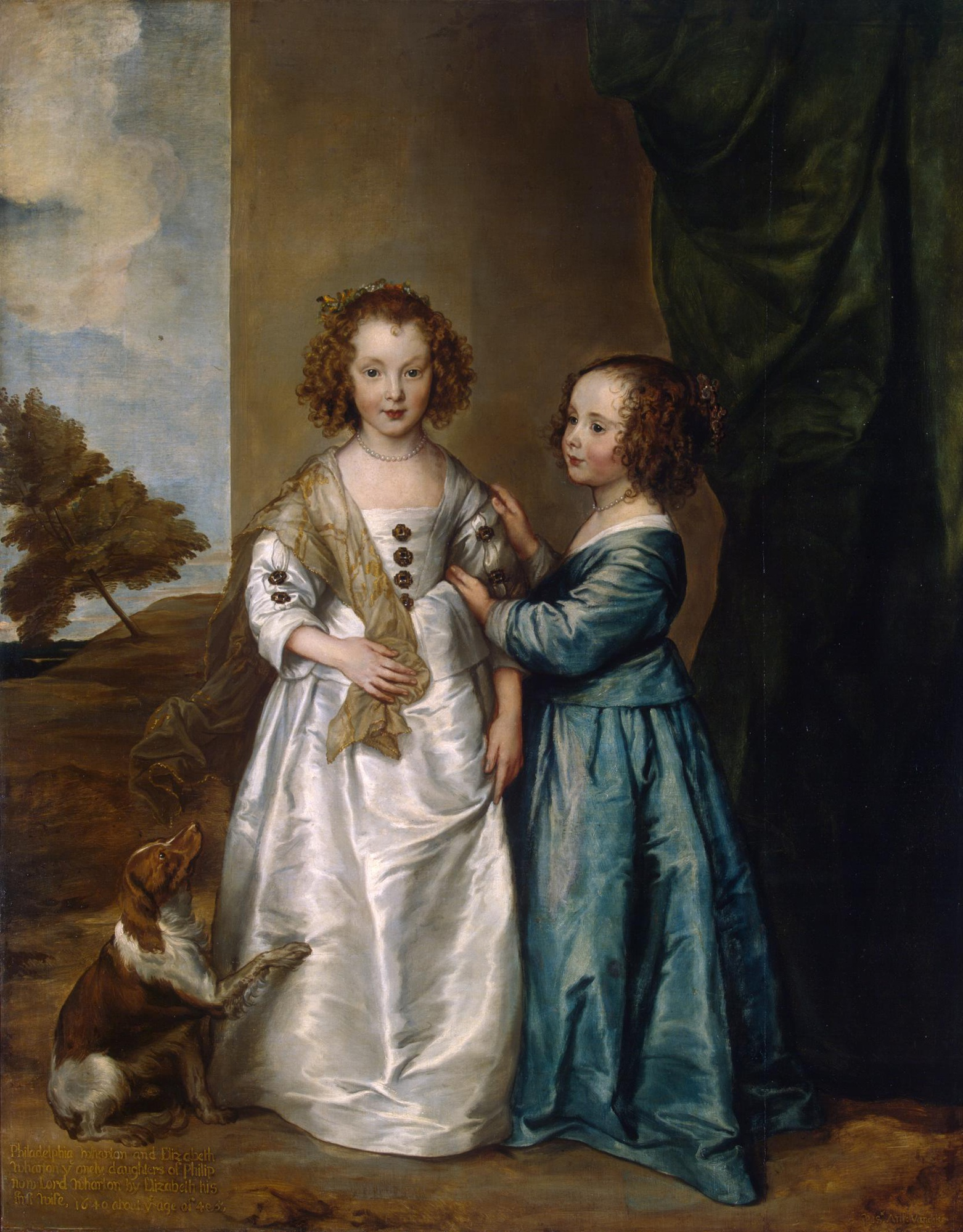
Van Dyck's double portrait of Philadelphia and Elisabeth Wharton. These were described by Oliver Millar as "two of the most touching portraits" ever produced by van Dyck.

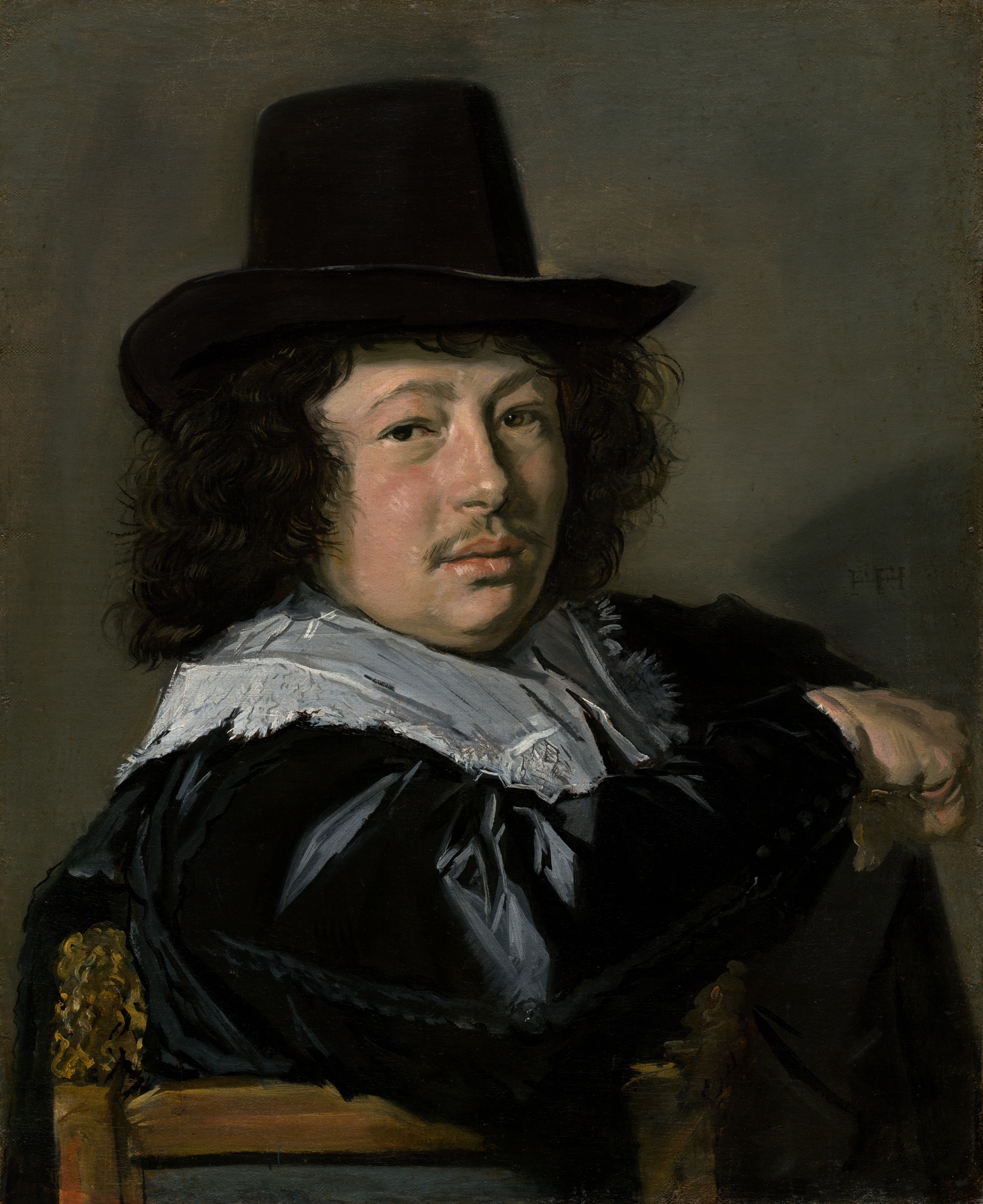
Portrait of a young man by Frans Hals - part of the collection now in the National Gallery of Art, Washington
