= St Martin at Tours' Church, Houghton =

Coordinates: 52.8231°N 0.6606°E

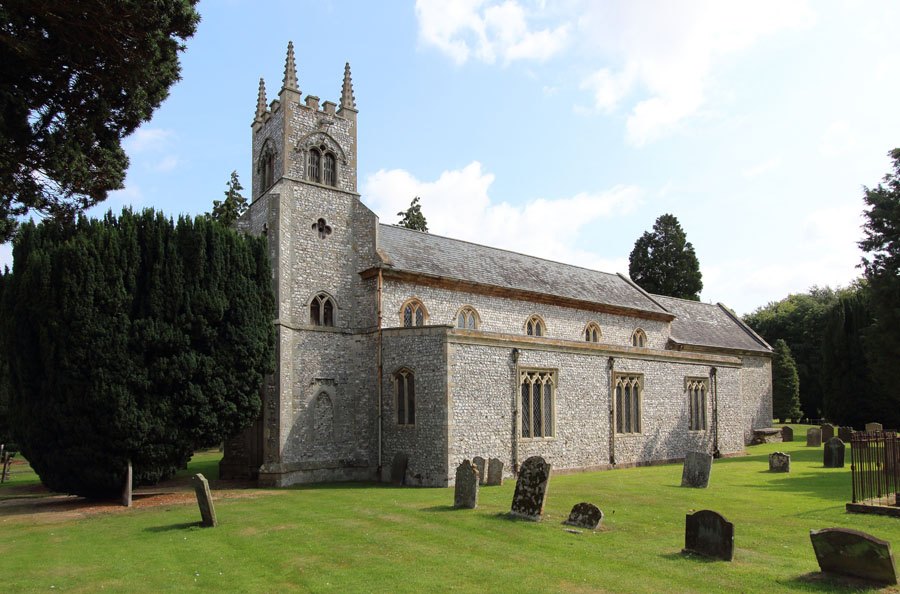
- St Martin at Tours' Church, Houghton

- Location in Norfolk
- OS grid reference: TF 79370 28382
- Location: Houghton, Norfolk
- Country: England
- Denomination: Anglican

History
- Dedication: Saint Martin of Tours

Architecture
- Functional status: Church of England parish church
- Heritage designation: Grade I
- Designated: 5 June 1953
- Architectural type: Church
- Style: Perpendicular Gothic
- Groundbreaking: 14th century

St Martin at Tours' Church is an active Church of England parish church in the village of Houghton, Norfolk, England. It is a Grade I listed building. The church stands in the grounds of Houghton Hall, the 18th century house built by Robert Walpole, England's first Prime Minister and contains the graves of Sir Robert and his three successors as Earls of Orford of the second creation.

== History ==
The church of St Martin dates from the 14th century. It served the village of Houghton, Norfolk as its parish church. The wider Houghton Hall estate had been in possession of the Walpole family since the reign of Henry I. Robert Walpole was born at Houghton in 1676. Elected to Parliament in 1701, by 1721 he was First Lord of the Treasury in the Walpole–Townshend ministry and, following Charles Townshend's resignation in 1730, served as the King's first minister until his own resignation in 1742. (Note: Sir Robert Walpole is generally considered Britain's first Prime Minister.)

Walpole inherited Houghton in 1700 and immediately began a process of modernisation of the house and its surrounding park. As his political power increased, so did his ambitions for his estate and by 1720 he had determined to replace the Elizabethan house with a new Palladian mansion. (Note: Walpole is reputed to have spent £200,000 on the house and estate, and his heirs were frequently forced into dispersal sales of his extensive collection of art in order to service their debts.) In the grounds, he moved the village of Houghton to a new location at the southern edge of the estate, and enclosed the park. By 1732, the old village had been destroyed with the church the only remaining structure. This was also subjected to Walpolean improvement, with a new tower being constructed at the western end and most of the windows, and much of the interior being replaced. The West Tower was erected in memory of Walpole's grandfather, but, in addition to filial piety, the motivation was the re-creation of the church as a landscape feature on the transformed estate.

Sir Robert is buried in the church, along with his first wife, Catherine, his second wife, Maria, his brother, Galfridus, and his three successors as Earls of Orford of the second creation; his eldest son Robert, his grandson George, and his third son Horace. The church also holds the tombs of George Cholmondeley, 5th Marquess of Cholmondeley and of his wife, Sybil Sassoon.

The churchyard contains a memorial to one British and five Australian crew members of an Avro Lancaster bomber who were killed when their plane crashed at Houghton following a raid on the Ruhr Valley in October 1944.

St Martin's is within the Diocese of Norwich. Services are only held in the summer months, when the Houghton Hall estate is open to the public.

== Architecture ==
Although the basic structure of the church remains from its 14th-century origins, it was transformed by Walpole in the early 18th century. The West Tower is entirely his work, and Bill Wilson, in his 2002 revised Norfolk 2: North-West and South edition of the Pevsner Buildings of England, suggests that the clerestory, the "classical" cornice, and much else is likely of his time. The building material is typical Norfolk knapped flint with Carrstone dressings.

== Gallery ==
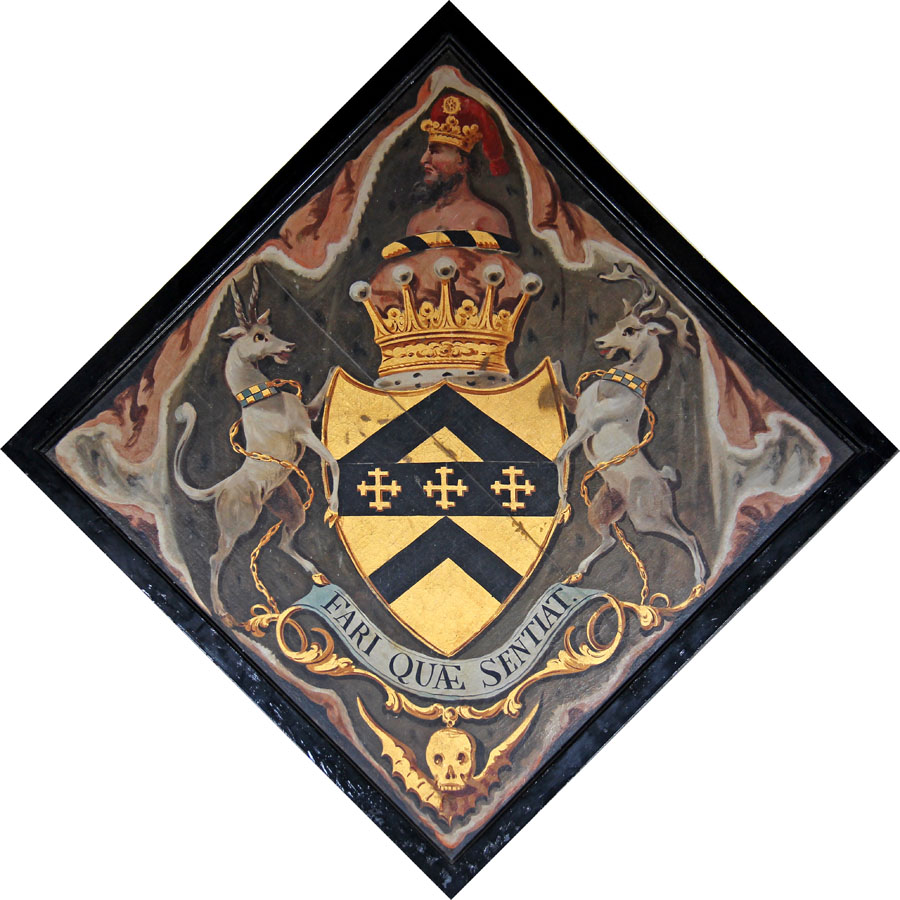
Hatchment of the Earls of Orford

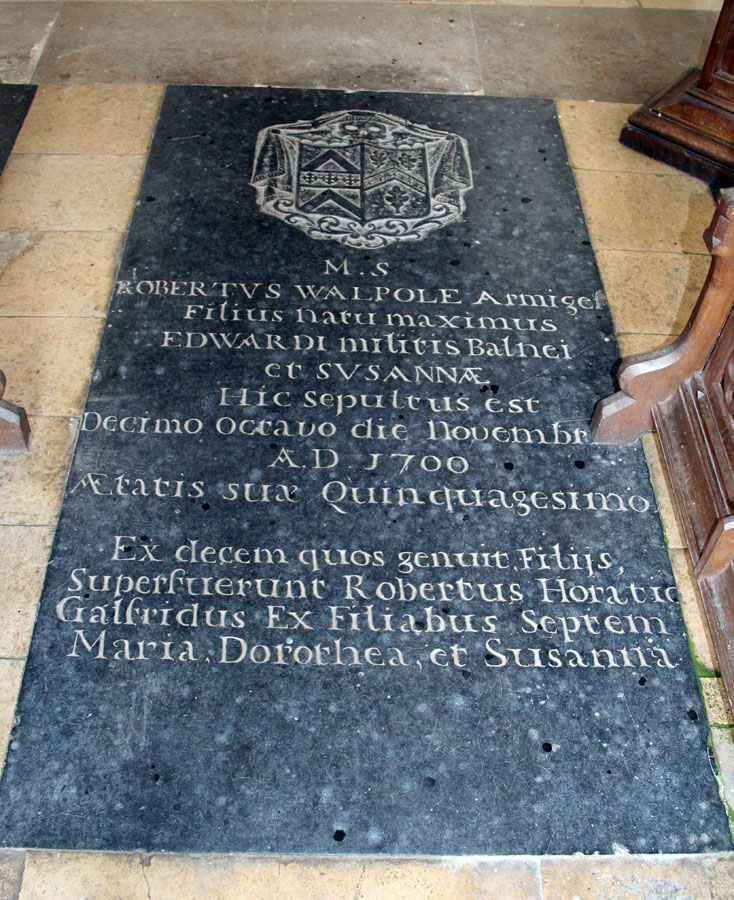
Grave of Robert Walpole's father

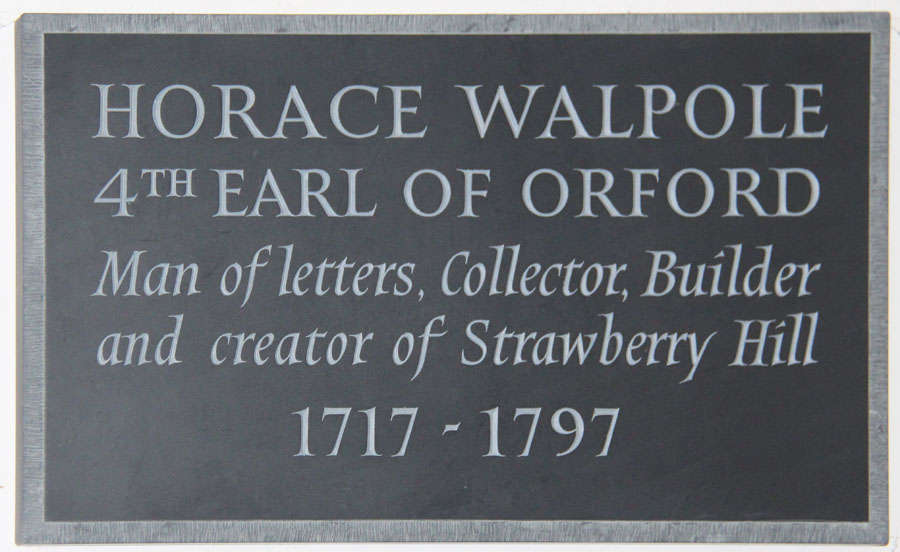
Memorial plaque to Horace Walpole

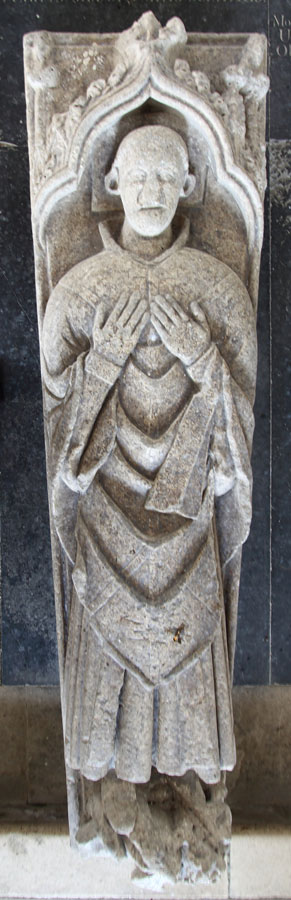
Effigy of a Prior of Cockesford, said to have been brought to the church in 1522

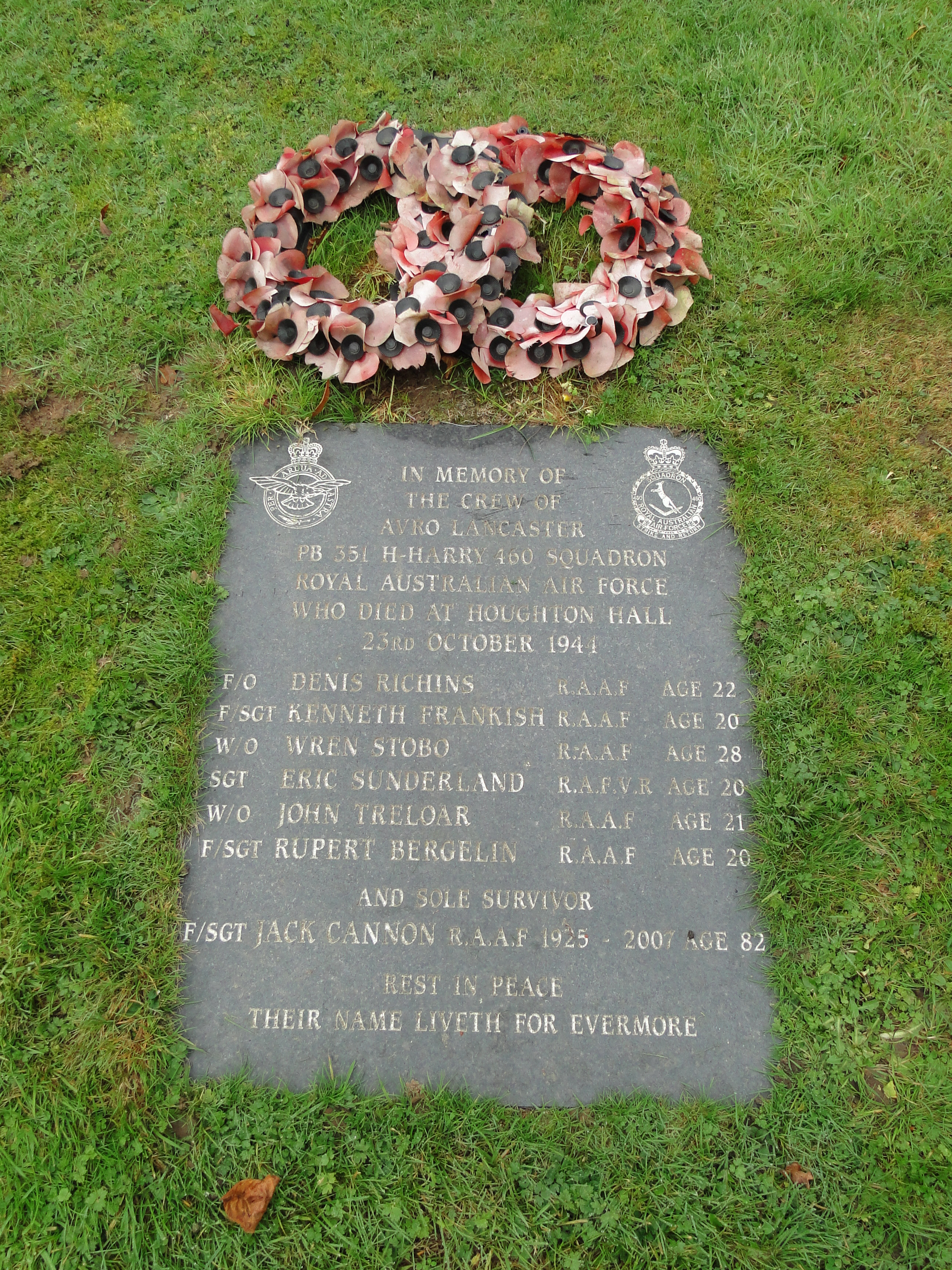
Memorial to Australian and British aircrew killed in a plane crash at Houghton, October 1944

== Sources ==
- Harris, John (1996). "The Architecture of the House". In Andrew Moore (ed.). Houghton Hall: The Prime Minister, The Empress and The Heritage. London: Philip Wilson Publishers. ISBN 978-0-856-67444-0. OCLC 1005869961.
- Jenkins, Simon (2003). England's Thousand Best Houses. London: Penguin Books. ISBN 978-0-713-99596-1.
- Pevsner, Nikolaus; Wilson, Bill (2002). Norfolk 2: North-West and South. The Buildings Of England. New Haven, US and London: Yale University Press. ISBN 978-0-300-09657-6.
- Williamson, Tom (1996). "The Planting of the Park". In Andrew Moore (ed.). Houghton Hall: The Prime Minister, The Empress and The Heritage. London: Philip Wilson Publishers. ISBN 978-0-856-67444-0. OCLC 1005869961.
