= Robert Walpole =

Prime Minister of Great Britain from 1721 to 1742

The Right Honourable The Earl of Orford KG PC
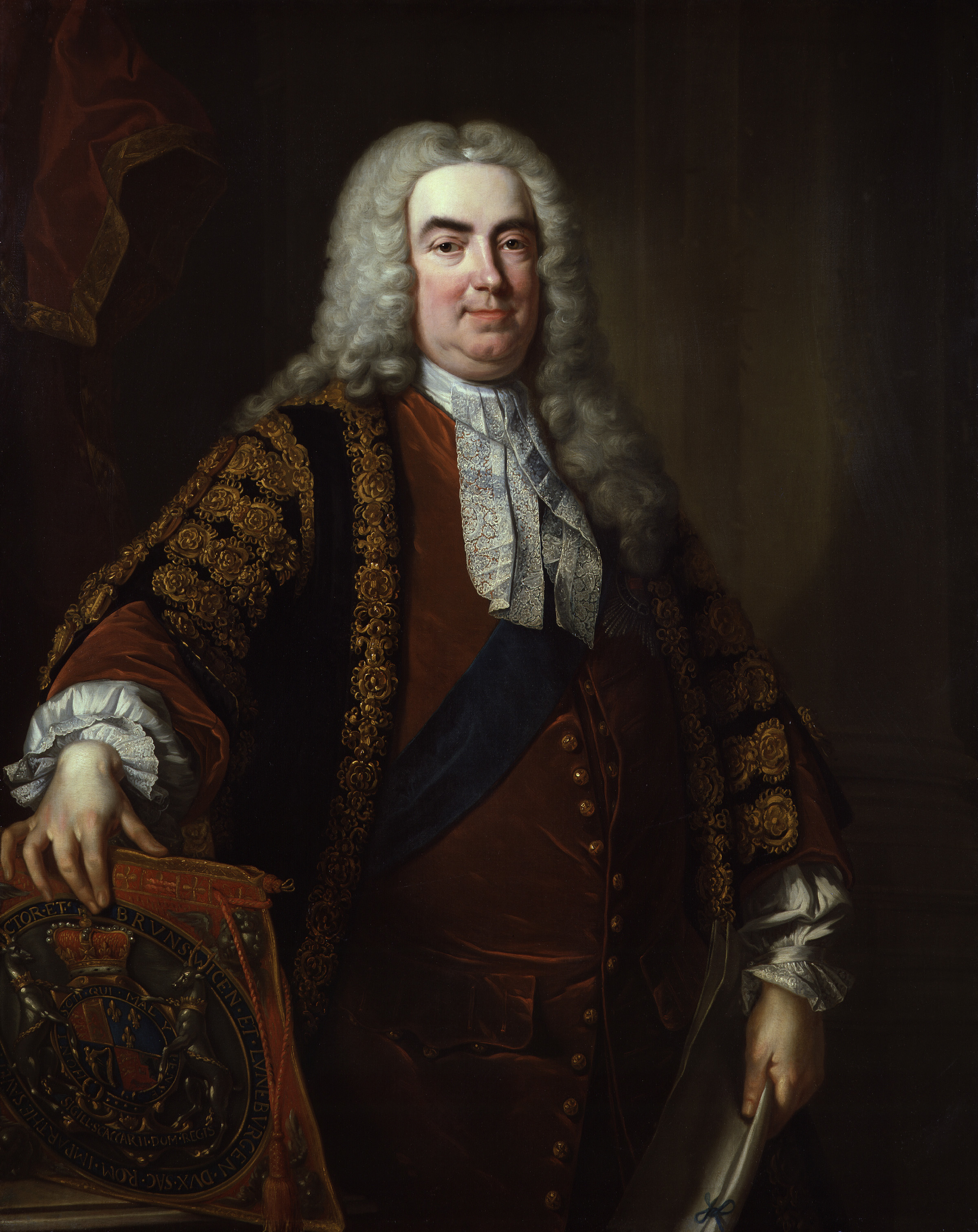
- Portrait by Jean-Baptiste van Loo, c. 1740

Prime Minister of Great Britain
- In office 3 April 1721 – 11 February 1742
- Monarchs: George I; George II
- Preceded by: Office established
- Succeeded by: The Earl of Wilmington

First Lord of the Treasury
- In office 3 April 1721 – 11 February 1742
- Preceded by: The Earl of Sunderland
- Succeeded by: The Earl of Wilmington
- In office 10 October 1715 – 12 April 1717
- Preceded by: The Earl of Carlisle
- Succeeded by: The Earl Stanhope

Chancellor of the Exchequer
- In office 3 April 1721 – 12 February 1742
- Preceded by: Sir John Pratt
- Succeeded by: Samuel Sandys
- In office 12 October 1715 – 15 April 1717
- Preceded by: Sir Richard Onslow
- Succeeded by: The Earl Stanhope
Further ministerial offices
Paymaster of the Forces
In office 11 June 1720 – 19 April 1721
Preceded by	The Earl of Lincoln
Succeeded by	The Lord Cornwallis
In office 3 October 1714 – 17 October 1715
Preceded by	John Grubham Howe; Thomas Moore
Succeeded by	The Earl of Lincoln
Treasurer of the Navy
In office 21 January 1710 – 2 January 1711
Preceded by	Sir Thomas Littleton
Succeeded by	Charles Caesar
Secretary at War
In office 25 February 1708 – 8 August 1710
Preceded by	Henry St John
Succeeded by	George Granville
Parliamentary offices
Leader of the House of Commons
In office 3 April 1721 – 6 February 1742
Succeeded by	Samuel Sandys
Member of Parliament for King's Lynn
In office 1713 – 6 February 1742
Preceded by	John Turner
Succeeded by	Edward Bacon
In office 11 February 1712 – 6 March 1712
Preceded by	Vacant
Succeeded by	John Turner
In office 1702 – 17 January 1712
Preceded by	Sir John Turner
Succeeded by	Vacant
Member of Parliament for Castle Rising
In office February 1701 – 1702
Preceded by	Robert Walpole
Succeeded by	Horatio Walpole

Personal details
- Born: 26 August 1676 Houghton, Norfolk, England
- Died: 18 March 1745 (aged 68) London, England
- Resting place: St Martin at Tours' Church, Houghton
- Party: Whig
- Spouses: Catherine Shorter (m. 1700; died 1737) Maria Skerret (m. 1738; died 1738)
- Children: 6, including Robert, Edward and Horace
- Parent: Robert Walpole (father)
- Relatives: Walpole family
- Education: Eton College; King's College, Cambridge
- Occupation: Politician; scholar

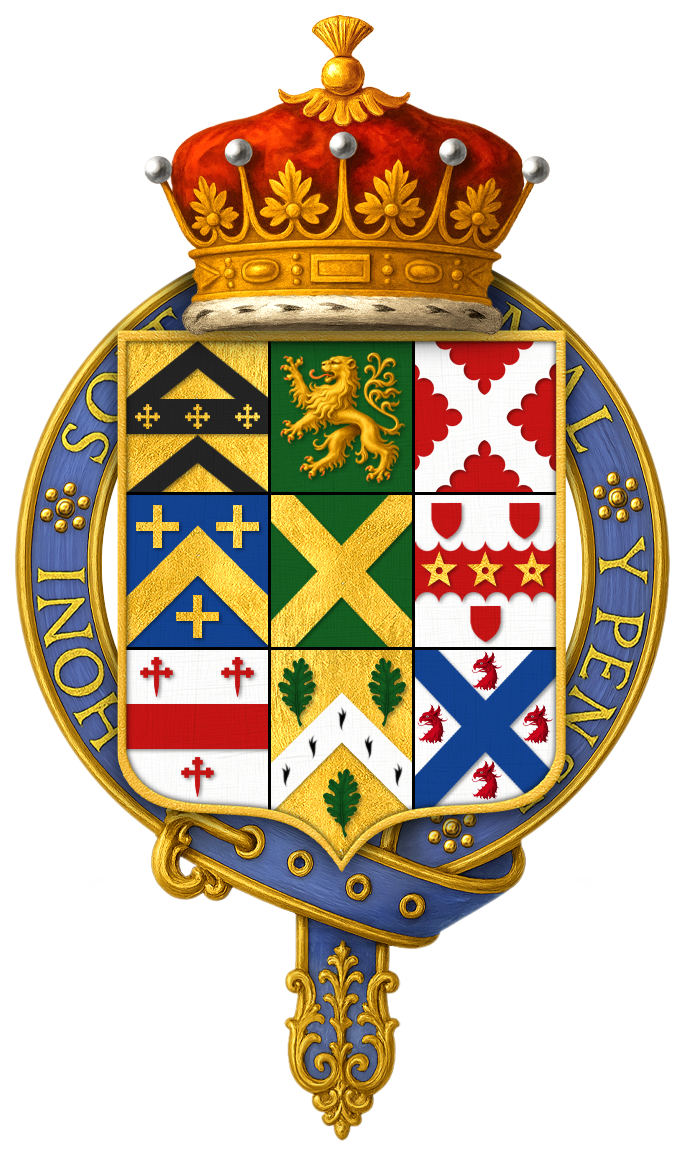
Quartered arms of Robert Walpole, 1st Earl of Orford, KG, KB, PC

Robert Walpole, 1st Earl of Orford (/ˈwɔːlpoʊl/; 26 August 1676 – 18 March 1745), known between 1725 and 1742 as Sir Robert Walpole, was a British Whig statesman who is generally regarded as the de facto (Note: Walpole himself did not use the title "Prime Minister", which was originally a term of abuse, stating in 1741: "I unequivocally deny that I am sole and prime minister.") first Prime Minister of Great Britain, (Note: After the Acts of Union 1800, the title became Prime Minister of the United Kingdom) serving from 1721 to 1742. His formal titles included First Lord of the Treasury, Chancellor of the Exchequer, and Leader of the House of Commons. He is the longest serving prime minister in UK history, with a tenure of over 20 years.

Although the exact dates of Walpole's dominance, dubbed the "Robinocracy", are a matter of scholarly debate, the period 1721–1742 is often used. He dominated the Walpole–Townshend ministry, as well as the subsequent Walpole ministry, and holds the record as the longest-serving British prime minister. W. A. Speck wrote that Walpole's uninterrupted run of 20 years as prime minister "is rightly regarded as one of the major feats of British political history. Explanations are usually offered in terms of his expert handling of the political system after 1720, [and] his unique blending of the surviving powers of the crown with the increasing influence of the Commons".

Walpole was a Whig from the gentry class who was first elected to Parliament in 1701 and held many senior positions. He was a country squire and looked to country gentlemen for his political base. Historian F. O'Gorman says his leadership in Parliament reflected his "reasonable and persuasive oratory, his ability to move both the emotions as well as the minds of men, and, above all, his extraordinary self-confidence". Julian Hoppit says Walpole's policies sought moderation, he worked for peace, lower taxes and growing exports, and allowed a little more tolerance for Protestant Dissenters. He mostly avoided controversy and high-intensity disputes as his middle way attracted moderates from both the Whig and Tory camps; his appointment to Chancellor of the Exchequer after the South Sea Bubble stock-market crisis drew attention to perceived protection of political allies by Walpole.

Historian H. T. Dickinson sums up his historical role by saying that "Walpole was one of the greatest politicians in British history. He played a significant role in sustaining the Whig party, safeguarding the Hanoverian succession, and defending the principles of the Glorious Revolution (1688). He established stable political supremacy for the Whig party and taught succeeding ministers how best to establish an effective working relationship between Crown and Parliament." Some scholars rank him highly among British prime ministers.

== Early life ==
Walpole was born in Houghton, Norfolk, in 1676. One of 19 children, he was the third son and fifth child of Robert Walpole, a member of the local gentry and a Whig politician who represented the borough of Castle Rising in the House of Commons. His wife Mary Burwell was the daughter and heiress of Sir Geoffrey Burwell of Rougham, Suffolk. Horatio Walpole, 1st Baron Walpole, was his younger brother.

As a child, Walpole attended a private school at Massingham, Norfolk. Walpole entered Eton College in 1690 where he was a King's Scholar. He left Eton on 2 April 1696 and matriculated at King's College, Cambridge, on the same day. On 25 May 1698, he left Cambridge after the death of his only remaining older brother, Edward, so that he could help his father administer the family estate to which he had become the heir. Walpole had planned to become a clergyman but as he was now the eldest surviving son in the family, he abandoned the idea. In November 1700 his father died, and Robert succeeded to inherit the Walpole estate. A paper in his father's handwriting, dated 9 June 1700, shows the family estate in Norfolk and Suffolk to have been nine manors in Norfolk and one in Suffolk.

== Early career ==
=== Political career ===
Walpole's political career began in January 1701 when he won a seat in the English general election at Castle Rising in Norfolk. He left Castle Rising in 1702 so that he could represent the neighbouring borough of King's Lynn, a pocket borough that would re-elect him for the remainder of his political career. Voters and politicians nicknamed him "Robin".

Like his father, Robert Walpole was a member of the Whig Party. In 1705, Walpole was appointed by Queen Anne to be a member of the council for her husband, Prince George of Denmark, Lord High Admiral. After having been singled out in a struggle between the Whigs and the government, Walpole became the intermediary for reconciling the government to the Whig leaders. His abilities were recognised by Lord Godolphin (the Lord High Treasurer and leader of the Cabinet) and he was subsequently appointed to the position of Secretary at War in 1708; for a short period of time in 1710 he also simultaneously held the post of Treasurer of the Navy.

Despite his personal clout, however, Walpole could not stop Lord Godolphin and the Whigs from pressing for the prosecution of Henry Sacheverell, a minister who preached anti-Whig sermons. The trial was extremely unpopular with much of the country, causing the Sacheverell riots, and was followed by the downfall of the Duke of Marlborough and the Whig Party in the general election of 1710. The new ministry, under the leadership of the Tory Robert Harley, removed Walpole from his office of Secretary at War but he remained Treasurer of the Navy until 2 January 1711. Harley had first attempted to entice him and then threatened him to get him to join the Tories, but Walpole rejected the offers, instead becoming one of the most outspoken members of the Whig Opposition. He effectively defended Lord Godolphin against Tory attacks in parliamentary debate, as well as in the press.

In 1712, Walpole was accused of venality and corruption in the matter of two forage contracts for Scotland. Although it was proven that he had retained none of the money, Walpole was pronounced "guilty of a high breach of trust and notorious corruption". He was impeached by the House of Commons and found guilty by the House of Lords; he was then imprisoned in the Tower of London for six months and expelled from Parliament. While in the Tower he was regarded as a political martyr, and visited by all the Whig leaders. After he was released, Walpole wrote and published anonymous pamphlets attacking the Harley ministry and assisted Sir Richard Steele in crafting political pamphlets. Walpole was re-elected for King's Lynn in 1713.

=== Stanhope–Sunderland ministry ===
Queen Anne died in 1714. Under the Act of Settlement 1701, which excluded Roman Catholics from the line of succession, Anne was succeeded by her second cousin, the Elector of Hanover, George I. George I distrusted the Tories, who he believed opposed his right to succeed to the throne. The year of George's accession, 1714, marked the ascendancy of the Whigs who would remain in power for the next fifty years. Robert Walpole became a Privy Councillor and rose to the position of Paymaster of the Forces in a Cabinet nominally led by Charles Montagu, 1st Earl of Halifax, but actually dominated by Charles Townshend, 2nd Viscount Townshend (Walpole's brother-in-law), and James Stanhope (later 1st Earl Stanhope). Walpole was also appointed chairman of a secret committee formed to investigate the actions of the previous Tory ministry in 1715. Robert Harley, 1st Earl of Oxford and Earl Mortimer, was impeached, and Henry St John, 1st Viscount Bolingbroke, suffered from an act of attainder, the Attainder of Viscount Bolingbroke Act 1714 (1 Geo. 1. St. 2. c. 16).

Halifax, the titular head of the administration, died in 1715 and by 1716 Walpole was appointed to the posts of First Commissioner (Lord) of the Treasury and Chancellor of the Exchequer. He was a member of the Board of General Officers established in 1717 to investigate the abuse of pay. Walpole's fellow members, appointed by the Prince of Wales (later George II), included William Pulteney, 1st Earl of Bath, Secretary at War; General Henry Lumley; General Thomas Erle; and Sir Philip Meadowes, Controller of the Army and Knight Marshal of the King's Palace, (Note: Sir Philip Meadows Jnr. (d. 1757) – the son of Sir Philip Meadows Snr. (d. 1718) – was a commissioner of excise from 1698 to 1700, was on 2 July 1700 appointed knight-marshal of the king's household, and formally knighted by William III on 23 Dec. 1700 at Hampton Court. ...) whose daughter, Mary Meadows, was maid-of-honour to Walpole's friend, Queen Caroline. A keen huntsman, Walpole built for himself Great Lodge (Old Lodge) in Richmond Park. Philip Medows, the deputy ranger of the park and son of Walpole's political ally, Sir Philip Meadowes, lived at Great Lodge after Walpole had vacated it.

In his new political positions, and encouraged by his advisers, Walpole introduced the sinking fund, a device to reduce the national debt. The Cabinet of which he was a member was often divided over most important issues. Normally, Walpole and Townshend were on one side, with Stanhope and Charles Spencer, 3rd Earl of Sunderland on the other. Foreign policy was the primary issue of contention; George I was thought to be conducting foreign affairs with the interests of his German territories, rather than those of Great Britain, at heart. The Stanhope–Sunderland faction, however, had the King's support. In 1716 Townshend had been removed from the important post of Northern Secretary and put in the lesser office of Lord Lieutenant of Ireland.

Even this change did not appease Stanhope and Sunderland, who secured the dismissal of Townshend from the Lord-Lieutenancy in April 1717. On the next day, Walpole resigned from the Cabinet to join the Opposition "because I could not connive at some things that were carrying on", and by joining the opposition he did not intend "to make the king uneasy or to embarrass his affairs." This began the Whig Split, dividing the dominant party for three years. In the new Cabinet, Sunderland and Stanhope (who was created an Earl) were the effective heads. Walpole reversed his earlier support for the impeachment of Robert Harley, the former first minister, and joined with the Tory opposition in securing an acquittal in July 1717.

Soon after Walpole's resignation, a bitter family quarrel between the King and the Prince of Wales, split the royal family. Walpole and others who opposed the Government often congregated at Leicester House, the home of the Prince of Wales, to form political plans.

Walpole also became an adviser and close friend of the Prince of Wales's wife, Caroline. In 1720 he improved his position by bringing about a reconciliation between the Prince of Wales and the King.

Walpole continued to be an influential figure in the House of Commons. He was especially active in opposing one of the Government's more significant proposals, the Peerage Bill, which would have limited the power of the monarch to create new peerages. Walpole brought about a temporary abandonment of the bill in 1719 and the outright rejection of the bill by the House of Commons. This defeat led Stanhope and Sunderland to reconcile with their opponents; Walpole returned as Paymaster of the Forces and Townshend was appointed Lord President of the Council. By accepting the position of Paymaster, however, Walpole lost the favour of the Prince of Wales (the future King George II), who still harboured disdain for his father's Government.

== Premiership (1721–1742) ==
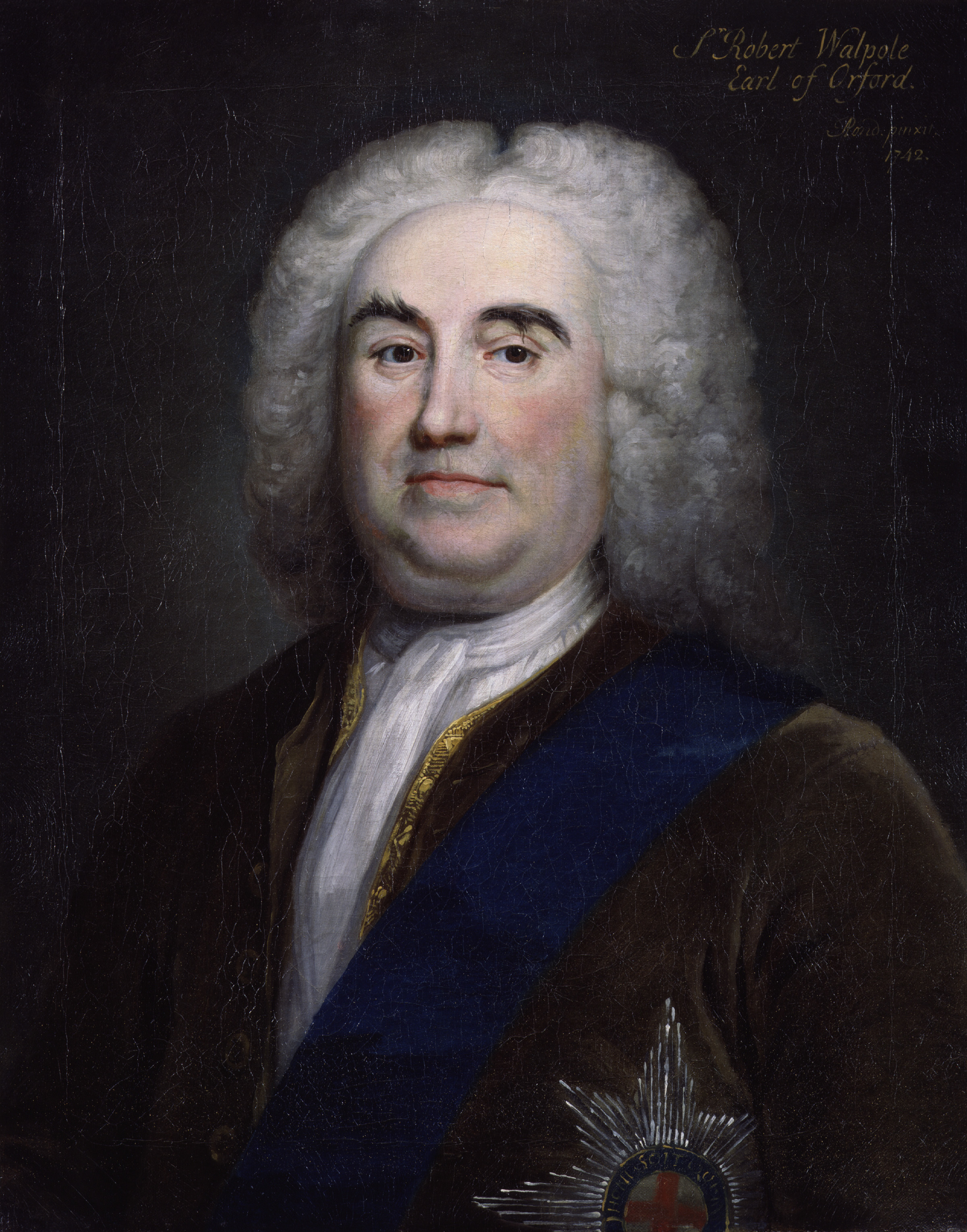
- Premiership of Robert Walpole; 3 April 1721 – 11 February 1742
- Monarchs: George I and George II
- Cabinet: Walpole ministry
- Party: Whig
- Seat: 10 Downing Street

Soon after Walpole returned to the Cabinet, Britain was swept by a wave of over-enthusiastic speculation which led to the South Sea Bubble. The Government had established a plan whereby the South Sea Company would assume the national debt of Great Britain in exchange for lucrative bonds. It was widely believed that the company would eventually reap an enormous profit through international trade in cloth, agricultural goods, and slaves. Many in the country, including Walpole himself, frenziedly invested in the company. By the latter part of 1720, however, the company had begun to collapse as the price of its shares plunged. In 1721 a committee investigated the scandal, finding that there was corruption on the part of many in the Cabinet. Among those implicated were John Aislabie (the Chancellor of the Exchequer), James Craggs the Elder (the Postmaster General), James Craggs the Younger (the Southern Secretary), and even Lords Stanhope and Sunderland (the heads of the Ministry). Both Craggs the Elder and Craggs the Younger died in disgrace; the remainder were impeached for their corruption. Aislabie was found guilty and imprisoned, but the personal influence of Walpole saved both Stanhope and Sunderland. For his role in preventing these individuals and others from being punished, Walpole gained the nickname of "The Screen", (Note: "After all the pains that have been taken to detect the villanys of the directors and their friends, I am afraid they will at last flip thro' their fingers, and that nothing further will be done as to confiscation, hanging, &c. There certainly is a majority in the house of commons, that are willing to do themselves and the kingdom justice; but they act so little in concert together [...] He [ Thomas Brodrick ] is [...] the spring that gives motion to the whole body; and the only man that either can or will set matters in a true light, and expose and baffle the schemes of the skreen, &c. The house were five hours in a committee [...] and were amuse'd and banter'd [...] by questions and amendments propos'd by the skreen, &c. so that they rose at last without coming to any resolution. [...] the kingdom is like to be very happy, when the skreen, and the gentleman [Sunderland] with the bloody nose, act in perfect concert together.") or "Screenmaster-General".

The resignation of Sunderland and the death of Stanhope in 1721 left Walpole as the most important figure in the administration. On 3 April 1721 he was appointed First Lord of the Treasury, Chancellor of the Exchequer and Leader of the House of Commons. Walpole's de facto tenure as "prime minister" is often dated to his appointment as First Lord of the Treasury in 1721, though he himself rejected that title (it was originally a term of abuse), stating in 1741: "I unequivocally deny that I am sole and prime minister." His brother-in-law Lord Townshend served as Secretary of State for the Northern Department and controlled the nation's foreign affairs. The two also had to contend with the Secretary of State for the Southern Department, Lord Carteret. Townshend and Walpole were thus restored to power and "annihilated the opposing faction".

=== First term ===
Portrait of Walpole, c. 1720–1726

Under the guidance of Walpole, Parliament attempted to deal with the financial crisis brought on by the South Sea Bubble. The estates of the directors of the South Sea Company were used to relieve the suffering of the victims, and the stock of the company was divided between the Bank of England and East India Company. The crisis had gravely damaged the credibility of the King and of the Whig Party, but Walpole defended both with skilful oratory in the House of Commons.

Walpole's first year as prime minister was also marked by the discovery of a plot formed by Francis Atterbury, the bishop of Rochester. The exposure of the scheme crushed the hopes of the Jacobites whose previous attempts at rebellion (most notably the risings of 1715 and 1719) had also failed. The Tory Party was equally unfortunate even though Lord Bolingbroke, a Tory leader who fled to France to avoid punishment for his Jacobite sympathies, was permitted to return to Britain in 1723.

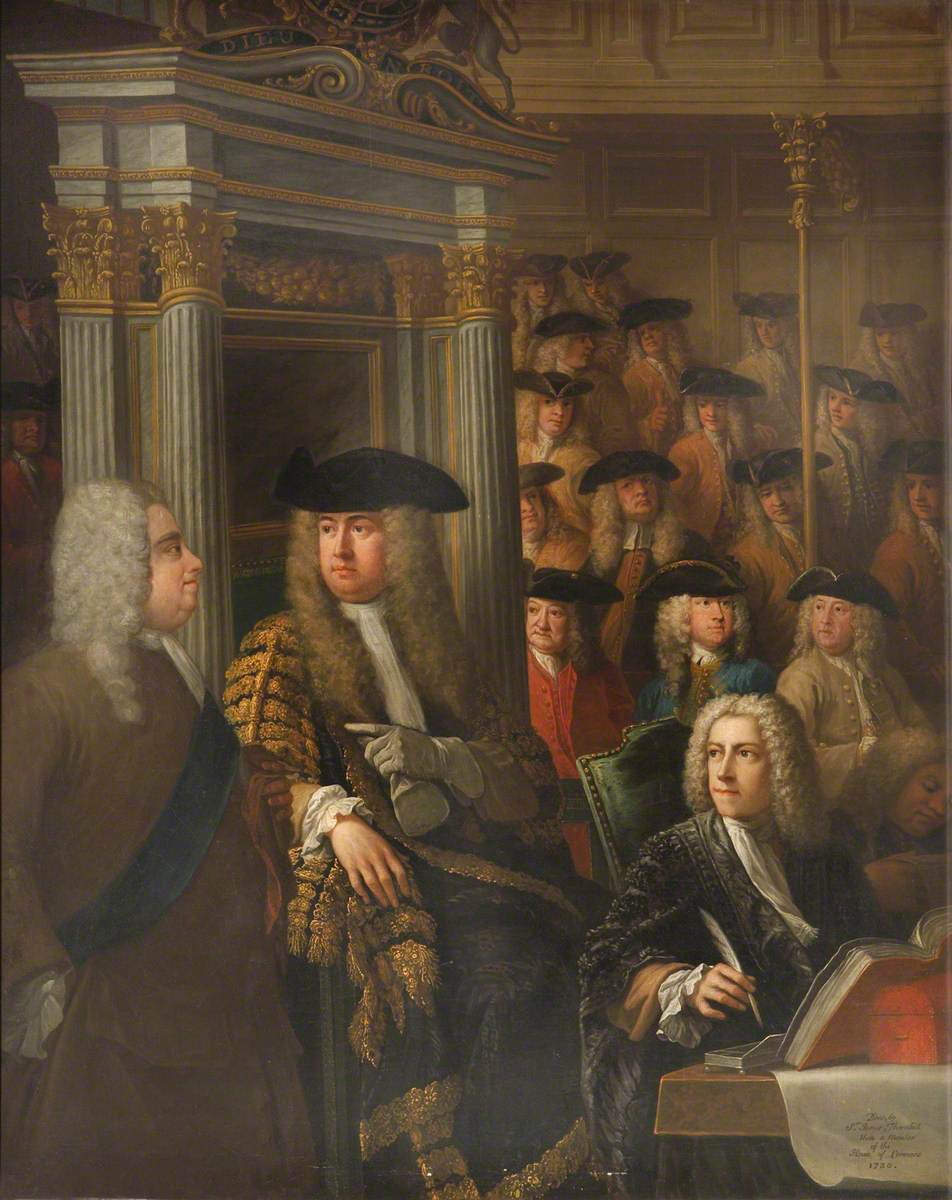
Speaker Arthur Onslow calling upon Sir Robert Walpole to Speak in the House of Commons by William Hogarth

During the remainder of George I's reign, Walpole's ascendancy continued; the political power of the monarch was gradually diminishing and that of his ministers gradually increasing. In 1724 the primary political rival of Walpole and Townshend in the Cabinet, Lord Carteret, was dismissed from the post of Southern Secretary and once again appointed to the lesser office of Lord Lieutenant of Ireland. In Ireland, Lord Carteret used his power to secretly aid in the controversy over Wood's Halfpence and support Drapier's Letters behind the scenes and cause harm to Walpole's power. Walpole was able to recover from these events by removing the patent. However, Irish sentiment was situated against the English control.

Townshend, working with the King, helped keep Great Britain at peace, especially by negotiating a defensive alliance with France and Prussia in 1725. Walpole was not consulted and stated that Townshend was "too precipitate" in his actions. Great Britain, free from Jacobite threats, from war, and from financial crises, grew prosperous, and Robert Walpole acquired the favour of George I. In 1725 he persuaded the King to revive the Order of the Bath and was himself invested with it, and in 1726 was made a Knight of the Garter, earning him the nickname "Sir Bluestring". His eldest son was granted a barony.

=== Second term ===
Walpole's position was threatened in 1727 when George I died and was succeeded by George II. For a few days it seemed that Walpole would be dismissed but, on the advice of Queen Caroline, the King agreed to keep him in office. Although the King disliked Townshend, he retained him as well. Over the next years Walpole continued to share power with Townshend but the two clashed over British foreign affairs, especially over policy regarding Austria. Gradually Walpole became the clearly dominant partner in government. His colleague retired on 15 May 1730 and this date is sometimes given as the beginning of Walpole's unofficial tenure as prime minister. Townshend's departure enabled Walpole to conclude the Treaty of Vienna, creating the Anglo-Austrian alliance.

==== Opposition ====
Walpole, a polarising figure, had many opponents, the most important of whom were in the Country Party, such as Lord Bolingbroke (who had been his political enemy since the days of Queen Anne) and William Pulteney (a capable Whig statesman who felt snubbed when Walpole failed to include him in the Cabinet). Bolingbroke and Pulteney ran a periodical called The Craftsman in which they incessantly denounced the Prime Minister's policies. Walpole was also satirised and parodied extensively; he was often compared to the criminal Jonathan Wild as, for example, John Gay did in his farcical The Beggar's Opera. Walpole's other enemies included Jonathan Swift, Alexander Pope, Henry Fielding, and Samuel Johnson.

==== Support ====
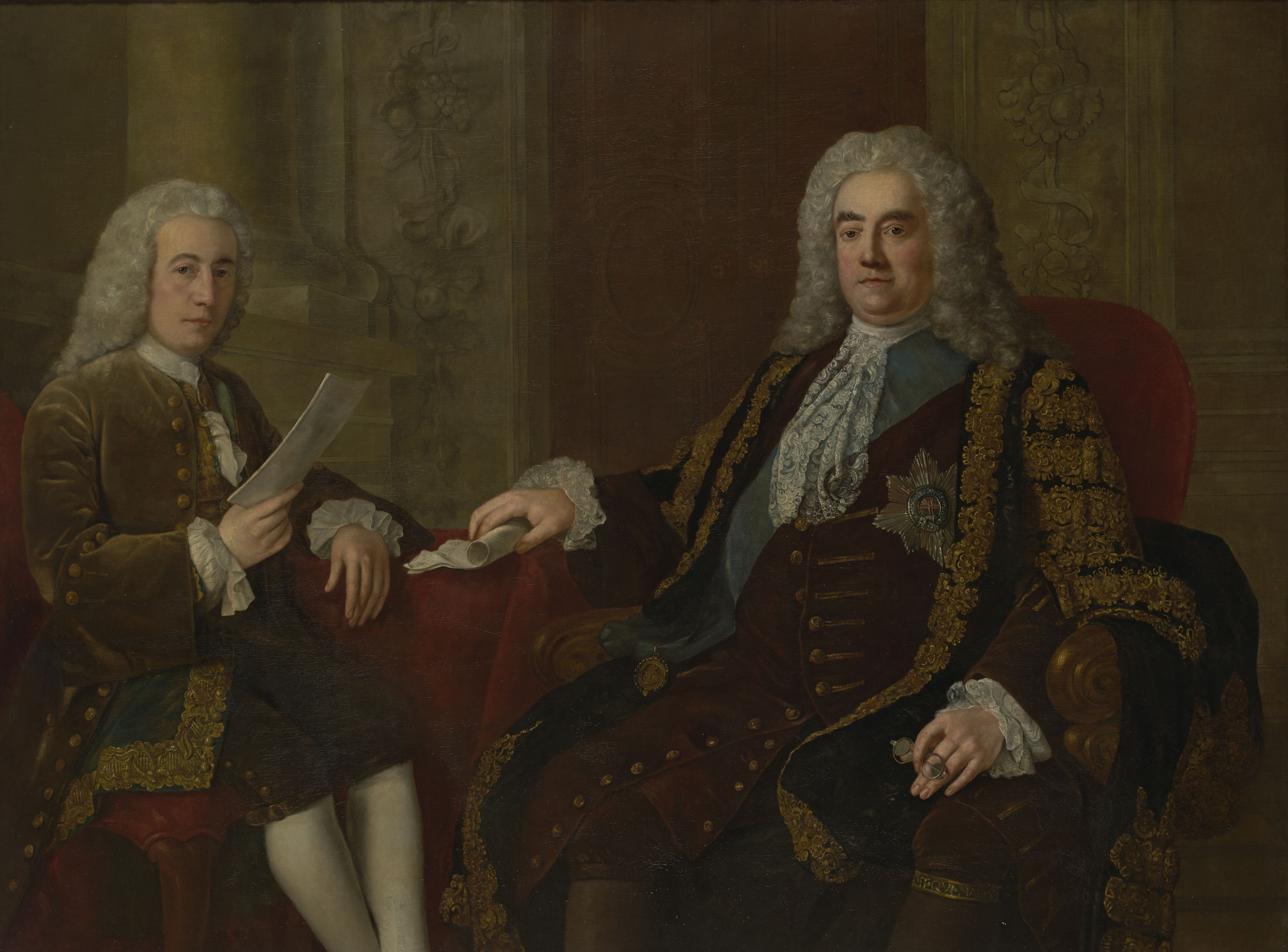
Walpole with his secretary, Henry Bilson-Legge, by Stephen Slaughter

Walpole secured the support of the people and of the House of Commons with a policy of avoiding war. He used his influence to prevent George II from entering the War of the Polish Succession in 1733, because it was a dispute between the Bourbons and the Habsburgs. He boasted, "There are 50,000 men slain in Europe this year, and not one Englishman." By avoiding wars, Walpole could lower taxes. He reduced the national debt with a sinking fund, and by negotiating lower interest rates. He reduced the land tax from four shillings in 1721, to 3s in 1728, 2s in 1731 and finally to only 1s in 1732. His long-term goal was to replace the land tax, which was paid by the local gentry, with excise and customs taxes, which were paid by merchants and ultimately by consumers. Walpole joked that the landed gentry resembled hogs, which squealed loudly whenever anyone laid hands on them. By contrast, he said, merchants were like sheep, and yielded their wool without complaint. The joke backfired in 1733 when he was defeated in a major battle to impose excise taxes on wine and tobacco. To reduce the threat of smuggling, the tax was to be collected not at ports but at warehouses. This new proposal, however, was extremely unpopular and aroused the opposition of the nation's merchants. Walpole agreed to withdraw the bill before Parliament voted on it, but he dismissed the politicians who had dared to oppose it in the first place. Thus, Walpole lost a considerable element of his Whig Party to the Opposition.

After the general elections of 1734, Walpole's supporters still formed a majority in the House of Commons although they were less numerous than before. He maintained both his parliamentary supremacy and his popularity in Norfolk, his home county. In May 1734, he presented a new silver mace "weighing 168 ounces, gilt, and finely exchased, to the city of Norwich – on the cup part of it are Sir Robert's arms, and the arms of the city; it was first carried before Mayor Philip Meadows Esq. on the 29th of May". (Note: In 1734, a new silver mace, weighing 168 ounces, gilt and finely exchased, was presented to the city by the right honourable Sir Rob. Walpole; on the cup part of it are Sir Robert's arms, and the arms of the city; it was first carried before the Mayor on 29 May.) However, despite these great occasions, Walpole's broader popularity had begun to wane. In 1736 an increase in the tax on gin inspired riots in London. The even more serious Porteous riots broke out in Edinburgh after the King pardoned a captain of the guard (John Porteous) who had commanded his troops to shoot a group of protesters. Though these events diminished Walpole's popularity, they failed to shake his majority in Parliament. Walpole's domination over the House of Commons was highlighted by the ease with which he secured the rejection of Sir John Barnard's plan to reduce the interest on the national debt. Walpole was also able to persuade Parliament to pass the Licensing Act 1737 under which London theatres were regulated. The act revealed a disdain for Swift, Pope, Fielding, and other literary figures who had attacked his government in their works.

While the "country party" attacked Walpole relentlessly, he subsidised writers and lesser-known journalists such as William Arnall and Bishop Benjamin Hoadly as well as two men he named to the role of poet laureate, Laurence Eusden and Colley Cibber. They defended Walpole from the charge of evil political corruption by arguing that corruption is the universal human condition. Furthermore, they argued, political divisiveness was also universal and inevitable because of selfish passions that were integral to human nature. Arnall argued that government must be strong enough to control conflict, and in that regard, Walpole was quite successful. This style of "court" political rhetoric continued through the 18th century.

=== Decline ===
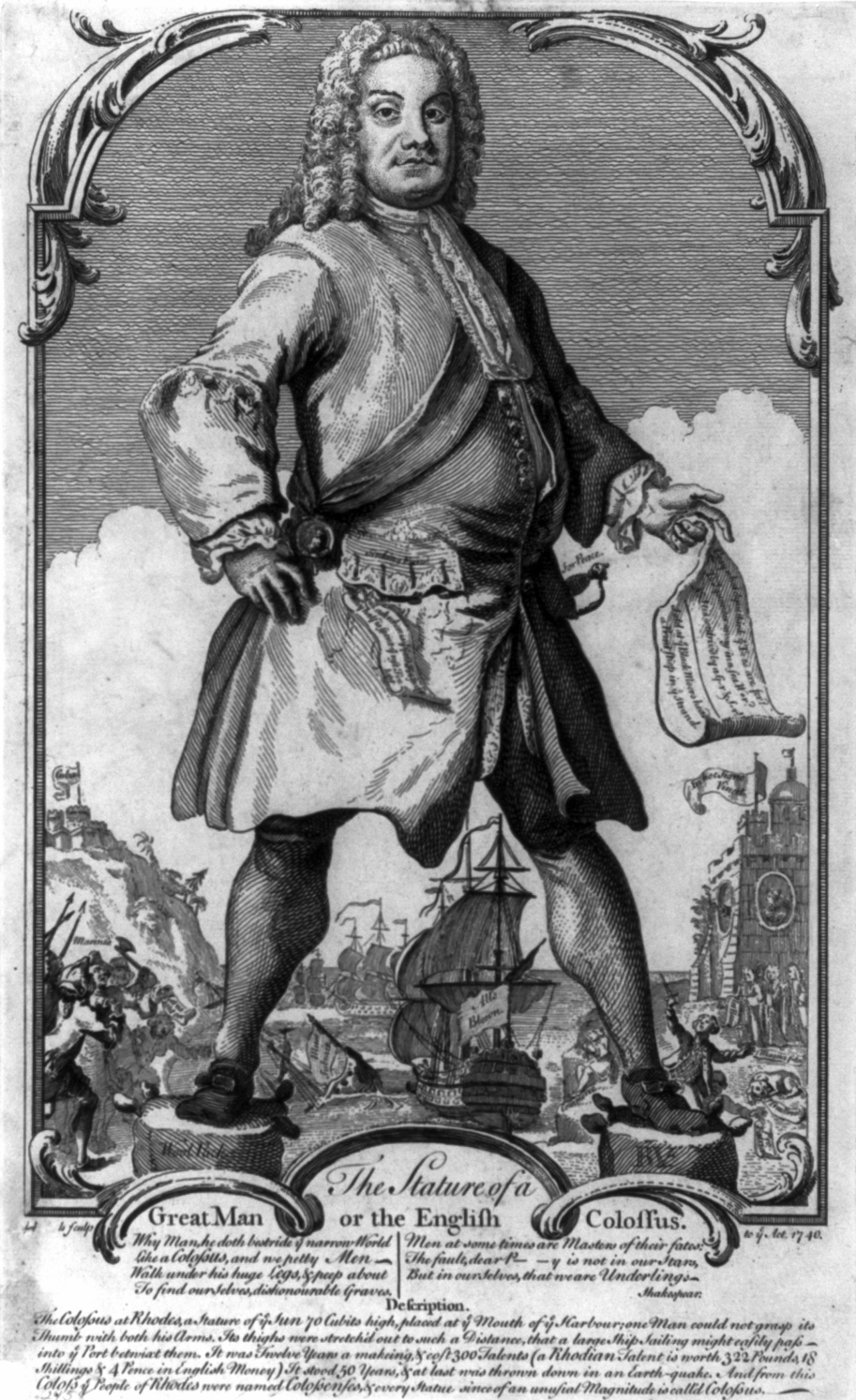
1740 political cartoon depicting Walpole as the Colossus of Rhodes, alluding to his reluctance to engage Spain and France militarily

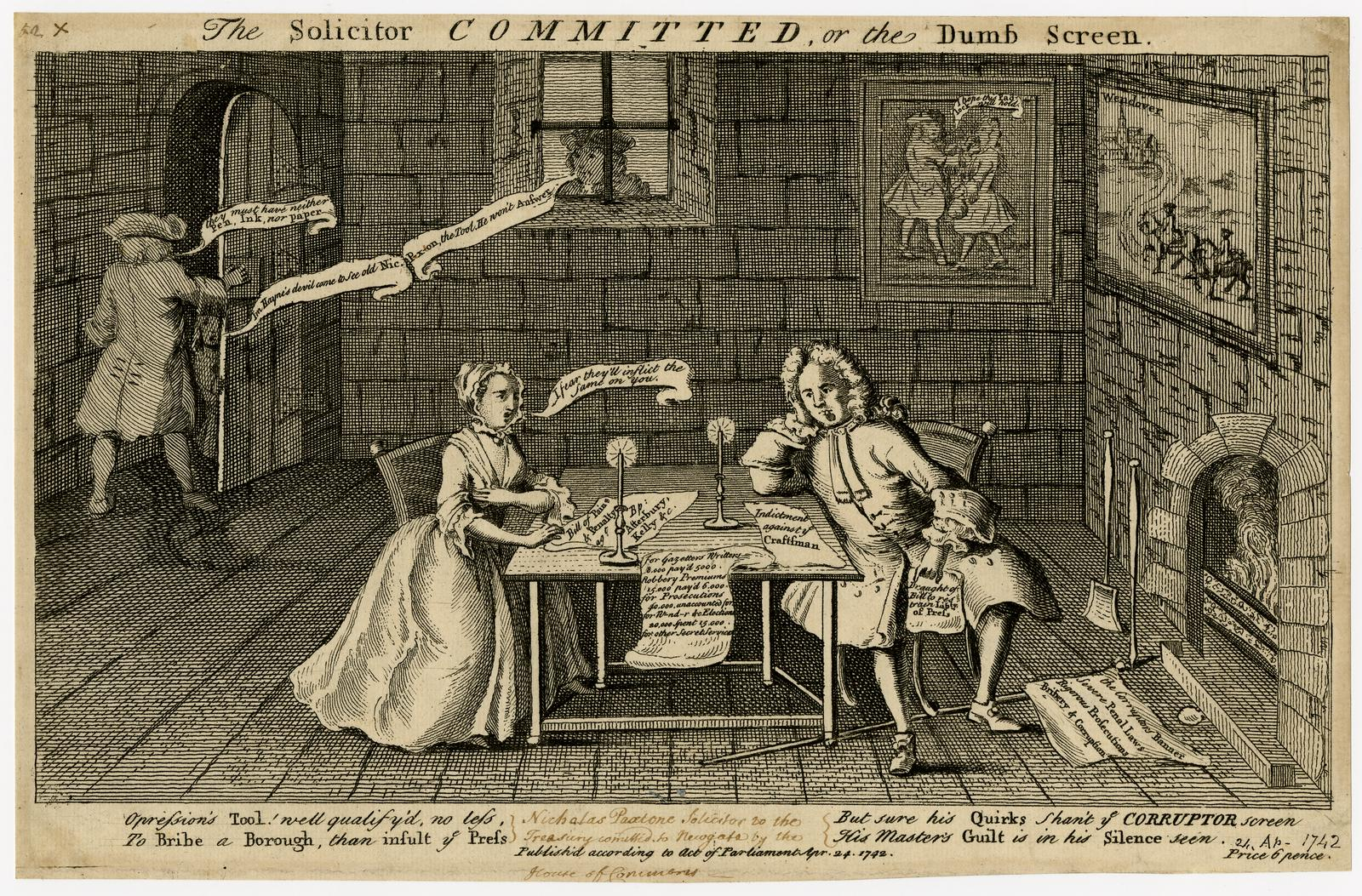
Satire on Nicholas Paxton, solicitor to the Treasury, and his refusal to answer questions from the Committee of Secrecy enquiring into the conduct of Robert Walpole

The year 1737 saw the death of Walpole's close friend Queen Caroline. Though her death did not end his personal influence with George II, who had grown loyal to the Prime Minister during the preceding years, Walpole's domination of government continued to decline. His opponents acquired a vocal leader in Frederick, Prince of Wales who was estranged from his father, the King. Several young politicians including William Pitt the Elder and George Grenville formed a faction known as the "Patriot Boys" and joined the Prince of Wales in opposition.

Walpole's failure to maintain a policy of avoiding military conflict eventually led to his fall from power. Under the Treaty of Seville (1729), Great Britain agreed not to trade with the Spanish colonies in North America. Spain claimed the right to board and search British vessels to ensure compliance with this provision. Disputes, however, broke out over trade with the West Indies. Walpole attempted to prevent war but was opposed by the King, the House of Commons, and by a faction in his own Cabinet. In 1739 Walpole abandoned all efforts to stop the conflict and commenced the War of Jenkins' Ear (so called because Robert Jenkins, a Welsh mariner, claimed that a Spaniard inspecting his vessel had severed his ear).

Walpole's influence continued to dramatically decline despite the capture of Portobelo (20–22 November 1739) a revenge of the 1727 to 1729 Anglo-Spanish War, when the British attempted to take Portobelo but retreated after heavy losses from disease. On 22 November 1739, the Admiral Vernon attacked the port with six ships of the line; it fell within twenty-four hours and the British occupied the town for three weeks before withdrawing, having first destroyed its fortifications, port and warehouses. But the most significant operation of the war was a failed British attack on Cartagena de Indias in 1741, which resulted in heavy casualties and was not repeated. In the 1741 general election his supporters secured an increase in votes in constituencies that were decided by mass electorates but failed to win in many pocket boroughs (constituencies subject to the informal but strong influence of patrons). In general, the government made gains in England and Wales but this was not enough to overturn the reverses of the 1734 election and further losses in Cornwall where many constituencies were obedient to the will of the Prince of Wales (who was also Duke of Cornwall). These constituencies returned members of parliament hostile to the Prime Minister. Similarly, the influence of John Campbell, 2nd Duke of Argyll secured the election of members opposed to Walpole in some parts of Scotland. Walpole's new majority was difficult to determine because of the uncertain loyalties of many new members, but contemporaries and historians estimated it as low as fourteen to eighteen.

In the new Parliament, many Whigs thought the ageing Prime Minister incapable of leading the military campaign. Moreover, his majority was not as strong as it had formerly been, his detractors – such as William Pulteney, Earl of Bath, and Lord Perceval – being approximately as numerous as his supporters. Behind these political enemies were opposition Whigs, Tories and Jacobites. Walpole was alleged to have presided over an immense increase in corruption and to have enriched himself enormously whilst in office. Parliamentary committees were formed to investigate these charges. In 1742 when the House of Commons was prepared to determine the validity of a by-election in Chippenham, Walpole and others agreed to treat the issue as a motion of no confidence. As Walpole was defeated on the vote, he agreed to resign from the Government. The news of the naval disaster against Spain in the Battle of Cartagena de Indias also prompted the end of his political career. King George II wept on his resignation and begged to see him frequently. As part of his resignation the King agreed to elevate him to the House of Lords as the Earl of Orford, Viscount Walpole and Baron Walpole of Houghton in the County of Norfolk, this occurred on 6 February 1742. Five days later he formally relinquished the seals of office.

Although no longer First Lord of the Treasury, Walpole remained politically involved as an advisor. His former colleagues were still pleased to see him, perhaps in part because he retained the King's favour. After his resignation, his main political roles were to support the government by means of advice, to dole out some patronage and to speak on the ministry's behalf in the Lords.

== Later life ==
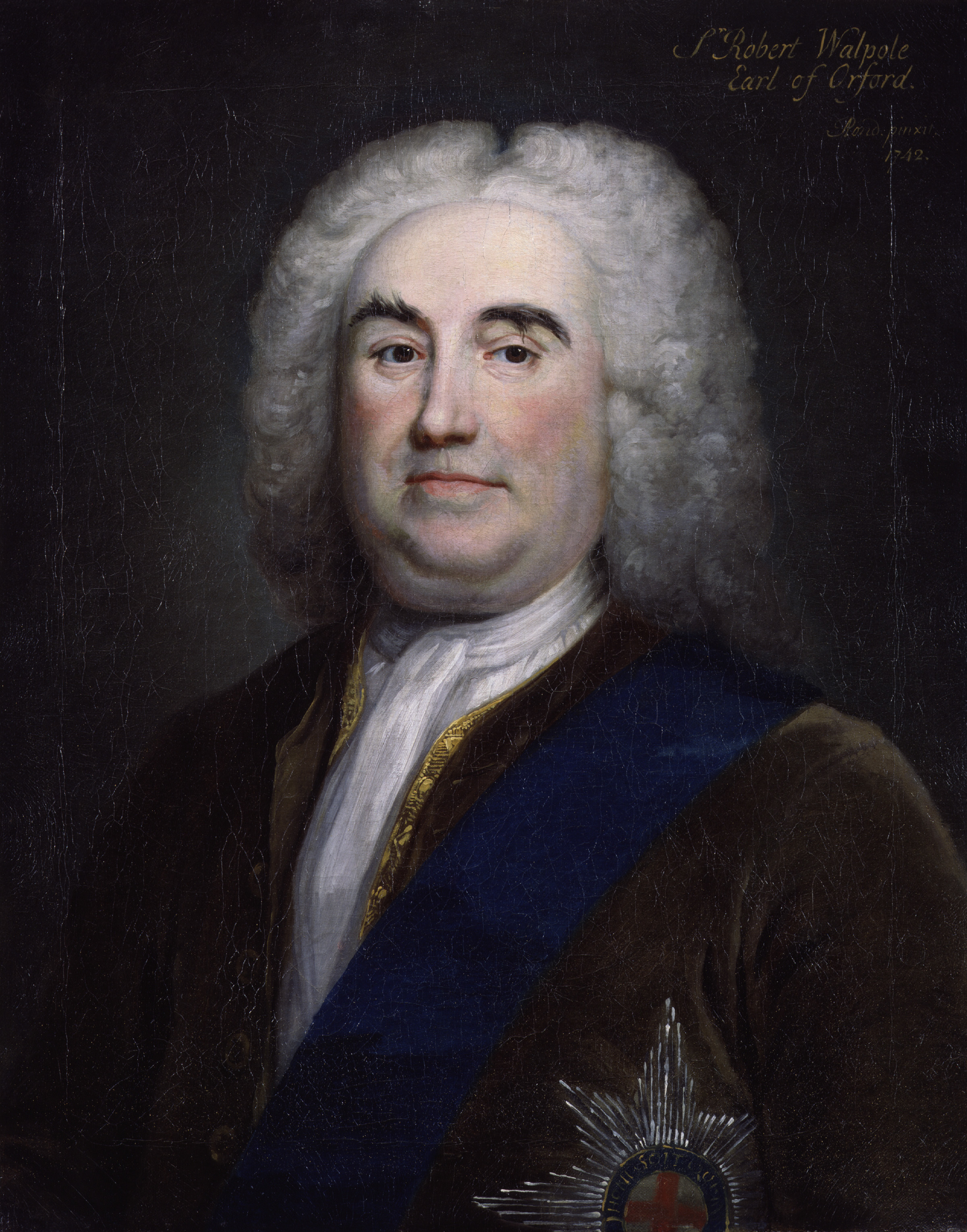
Robert Walpole by Arthur Pond, 1742

Lord Orford was succeeded as prime minister by Lord Wilmington in an administration whose true head was Lord Carteret. A committee was created to inquire into Walpole's ministry but no substantial evidence of wrongdoing or corruption was discovered. Though no longer a member of the Cabinet, Orford continued to maintain personal influence with George II and was often dubbed the "Minister behind the Curtain" for this advice and influence. In 1744 he managed to secure the dismissal of Carteret and the appointment of Henry Pelham whom he regarded as a political protégé. He advised Pelham to make use of his seat in the Commons to serve as a bridge between the King and Parliament, just as Walpole had done.

During this time, Walpole also made two interventions in the Lords. The first was in January 1744 in the debate on Hanoverian troops being kept in British pay. Walpole prevented them from losing the troops. In his second intervention, Walpole, with fear of a Jacobite-inspired invasion in February 1744, made a speech on the situation. Frederick, Prince of Wales, usually hostile to Walpole, warmly received him at his court the next day, most likely because his father's throne, and the future of the whole Hanoverian dynasty, was at risk from the Stuart Pretender.

Along with his political interests in his last years, Walpole enjoyed the pleasures of the hunt. Back at his recently rebuilt country seat in Houghton, Norfolk, such pastimes were denied him due to "dismal weather". He also enjoyed the beauties of the countryside. His art collection gave him particular pleasure. He had spent much money in the 1720s and 1730s in building up a collection of Old Masters from all over Europe. Walpole also concerned himself with estate matters.

His health, never good, deteriorated rapidly toward the end of 1744. Walpole died in London on 18 March 1745 from a bladder stone, aged 68 years, and was buried at the Church of St Martin at Tours on the Houghton Hall estate. His earldom passed to his eldest son, also called Robert, who was in turn succeeded by his only son George. Upon the death of the third Earl, the earldom was inherited by the first Earl's younger son Horace Walpole, who is now remembered for his many thousands of insightful letters, published in 48 volumes by Yale University Press. The title died with him in 1797.

== Legacy ==
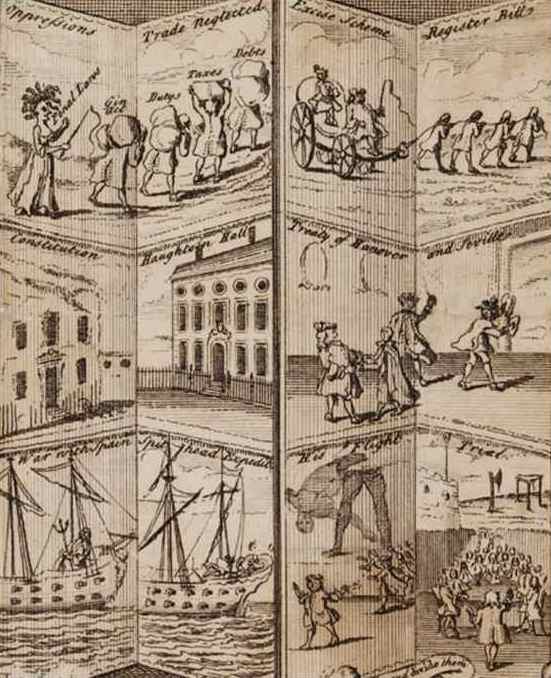
Walpole's reign, a contemporary political satire

Walpole exercised a tremendous influence on the politics of his day. The Tories became a minor insignificant faction, and the Whigs became a dominant and largely unopposed party. His influence on the development of the uncodified constitution of Great Britain was less momentous, even though he is regarded as Great Britain's first prime minister. He relied primarily on the favour of the King, rather than the support of the House of Commons. His power stemmed from his personal influence instead of the influence of his office. Most of his immediate successors were, comparatively speaking, extremely weak. It would take several decades more for the premiership to develop into the most powerful and most important office in the country.

Walpole's strategy of keeping Great Britain at peace contributed greatly to the country's prosperity. Walpole also managed to secure the position of the Hanoverian dynasty, and effectively countervailed Jacobitism. The Jacobite threat ended, soon after Walpole's term ended, with the defeat of the rebellion of 1745. Later in the century, the Whig MP Edmund Burke "admitted him into the whig pantheon". Burke wrote:

He was an honorable man and a sound Whig. He was not, as the Jacobites and discontented Whigs of his time have represented him, and as ill-informed people still represent him, a prodigal and corrupt minister. They charged him in their libels and seditious conversations as having first reduced corruption to a system. Such was their cant. But he was far from governing by corruption. He governed by party attachments. The charge of systematic corruption is less applicable to him, perhaps, than to any minister who ever served the crown for so great a length of time. He gained over very few from the Opposition. Without being a genius of the first class, he was an intelligent, prudent, and safe minister. He loved peace; and he helped to communicate the same disposition to nations at least as warlike and restless as that in which he had the chief direction of affairs. ... With many virtues, public and private, he had his faults; but his faults were superficial. A careless, coarse, and over familiar style of discourse, without sufficient regard to persons or occasions, and an almost total want of political decorum, were the errours [sic] by which he was most hurt in the public opinion: and those through which his enemies obtained the greatest advantage over him. But justice must be done. The prudence, steadiness, and vigilance of that man, joined to the greatest possible lenity in his character and his politics, preserved the crown to this royal family; and with it, their laws and liberties to this country.

Philip Stanhope, 4th Earl of Chesterfield expressed scepticism as to whether "an impartial Character of Sr Robert Walpole, will or can be transmitted to Posterity, for he governed this Kingdom so long that the various passions of Mankind mingled, and in a manner incorporated themselves, with every thing that was said or writt concerning him. Never was Man more flattered nor more abused, and his long power, was probably the chief cause of both". Chesterfield claimed he was "much acquainted with him both in his publick and his private life":

In private life he was good natured, chearfull, social. Inelegant in his manners, loose in his morals. He had a coarse wit, which he was too free of for a man in his station, as it is always inconsistent with dignity. He was very able as a Minister, but without a certain elevation of mind ... He was both the ablest Parliament man, and the ablest manager of a Parliament, that I believe ever lived ... Money, not prerogative, was the chief engine of his administration, and he employed it with a success that in a manner disgraced humanity ... When he found any body proof, against pecuniary temptations, which alass! was but seldom, he had recourse to still a worse art. For he laughed at and ridiculed all notions of publick virtue, and the love of one's country, calling them the chimerical school boy flights of classical learning; declaring himself at the same time, no Saint, no Spartan, no reformer. He would frequently ask young fellows at their first appearance in the world, while their honest hearts were yet untainted, well are you to be an old Roman? a patriot? you will soon come off of that, and grow wiser. And thus he was more dangerous to the morals, than to the libertys of his country, to which I am persuaded that he meaned no ill in his heart. ... His name will not be recorded in history among the best men, or the best Ministers, but much much less ought it to be ranked among the worst.

10 Downing Street represents another part of Walpole's legacy. George II offered this home to Walpole as a personal gift in 1732, but Walpole accepted it only as the official residence of the First Lord of the Treasury, taking up his residence there on 22 September 1735. His immediate successors did not always reside in Number 10 (preferring their larger private residences), but the home has nevertheless become established as the official residence of the prime minister (in his or her capacity as First Lord of the Treasury).

Walpole has attracted attention from heterodox economists as a pioneer of protectionist policies, in the form of tariffs and subsidies to woollen manufacturers. As a result, the industry became Britain's primary export, enabling the country to import the raw materials and food that fueled the industrial revolution.

Walpole is immortalised in St Stephen's Hall, where he and other notable Parliamentarians look on at visitors to Parliament.

Walpole rebuilt Houghton Hall in Norfolk as his country seat. He also left behind a collection of art which he had assembled during his career. His grandson, the 3rd Earl of Orford, sold many of the works in this collection to the Russian Empress Catherine II in 1779. This collection – then regarded as one of the finest in Europe – now lies in the Hermitage Museum in Saint Petersburg, Russia. In 2013 the Hermitage loaned the collection to Houghton for display, following the original William Kent hanging plan, which had been recently discovered at Houghton.

The nursery rhyme "Who Killed Cock Robin?" may allude to the fall of Walpole, who carried the popular nickname "Cock Robin". (Contemporaries satirised the Walpole regime as the "Robinocracy" or as the "Robinarchy".)

Various locations are named after Walpole, including Walpole Street in Wolverhampton, England; and the towns of Walpole, Massachusetts (founded in 1724), and Orford, New Hampshire (incorporated in 1761) in the United States.

== Marriages and issue ==
=== Catherine Shorter ===
Arms of Shorter, of Bybrook, Kent: Sable, a lion rampant or ducally crowned argent between three battle axes of the last headed of the second

On 30 July 1700, Walpole married Catherine Shorter (1682–1737), the eldest daughter and co-heiress of John Shorter of Bybrook in Ashford, Kent (the son of Sir John Shorter (1625–1688), Lord Mayor of London) by his wife Elizabeth Philipps (born c. 1664), a daughter of Sir Erasmus Philipps, 3rd Baronet. She was described as "a woman of exquisite beauty and accomplished manners". Her £20,000 dowry was, according to Walpole's brother Horatio Walpole, spent on the wedding, christenings and jewels. Her sister and co-heiress Charlotte Shorter married (as his third wife) Francis Seymour-Conway, 1st Baron Conway (1679–1731/2), by whom she was the mother of Francis Seymour-Conway, 1st Marquess of Hertford (1718–1794). Sir John Shorter (c. 1625–1688), Lord Mayor of London, married Isabel Birkhead, a sister of Edward Birkhead (d.1662) of Richmond House, Twickenham, Serjeant-at-Arms in the House of Commons in 1648, a Quaker Magistrate and the principal landowner in the parish of Twickenham. Catherine's youngest son Horace later built Strawberry Hill House on land purchased by him at Twickenham. Catherine Shorter died on 20 August 1737 and was buried at Houghton, with a monument in the south aisle of the King Henry VII Chapel, Westminster Abbey, erected by her son Horatio, in the form of a life-size white marble statue, a copy by Filippo della Valle of a Roman statue of Livia (or Pudicitia) in the Villa Mattei in Rome. (Note: "In five of the niches, on pedestals, are, I. A cart in plaifter bronzed of Catharine Lady Walpole, the model of her statue in Westminster Abbey, executed at Rome by Valory, and taken from the Livia or Pudicitia in the Villa Mattei" (now called Villa Celimontana).) On the plinth sculpted by John Michael Rysbrack is the following inscription written by Horace:

To the memory of Catherine Lady Walpole, eldest daughter of John Shorter, Esqr. of Bybrook in Kent and first wife of Sir Robert Walpole, afterwards Earl of Orford, Horace her youngest son consecrates this monument. She had beauty and wit without vice or vanity, and cultivated the Arts without affectation. She was devout, tho' without bigotry to any sect, and was without prejudice to any party tho' the wife of a minister, whose power she esteemed but when she could employ it to benefit the miserable or to reward the meritorious. She loved a private life, tho' born to shine in public; and was an ornament to courts, untainted by them. She died 20 August 1737.

By Catherine Shorter he had two daughters and three sons:

- Robert Walpole, 2nd Earl of Orford, eldest son and heir, who in 1724 married Margaret Rolle (17 January 1709 – 13 January 1781), later suo jure 15th Baroness Clinton. They had one son George Walpole, 3rd Earl of Orford and 16th Baron Clinton (1730–1791), who left no legitimate children and died insane.
- Katherine Walpole, who died unmarried and without issue;
- Mary Walpole, who on 14 September 1723 married George Cholmondeley, 3rd Earl of Cholmondeley. They had sons and daughters and the Houghton Estate eventually became the inheritance of the Cholmondeley family. She died at Aix-en-Provence in 1731, and was buried at Malpas, Cheshire.
- Edward Walpole, who died unmarried but had four illegitimate children by his mistress Dorothy Clement:
  - Edward, born in 1737, died in 1771 without issue;
  - Laura, the eldest daughter, who married Bishop Frederick Keppel;
  - Maria Walpole (d. 1807) (Duchess of Gloucester and Edinburgh), the second daughter, who married firstly James Waldegrave, 2nd Earl Waldegrave and secondly Prince William Henry, Duke of Gloucester and Edinburgh the brother of King King George III.
  - Charlotte, the youngest daughter, who married Lionel Tollemache, 5th Earl of Dysart.
- Horatio Walpole, 4th Earl of Orford (24 September 1717 – 2 March 1797), of Strawberry Hill House, Twickenham, youngest son, the diarist known to history as "Horace Walpole". He became the 4th and last Earl of Orford on his nephew's death in 1791, and died unmarried and without issue.

=== Maria Skerritt ===
Arms of Skerritt: Or, a chief indented sable

Prior to the death of his first wife Walpole took on a mistress, Maria Skeritt (d. 1738), a fashionable socialite of wit and beauty, with an independent fortune of £30,000, the daughter and sole heiress of Thomas Skeritt (d. 1738) (aliter Skerret, Skeritt, etc), a wealthy Irish merchant living in Dover Street, Mayfair, London. They had been living together openly in Richmond Park and Houghton Hall since before 1728, and married at some time before March 1738. She died on 4 June 1739 following a miscarriage. Walpole considered her "indispensable to his happiness", and her loss plunged him into a "deplorable and comfortless condition", which led to a severe illness. By Maria Skerritt he had one daughter, born before the marriage, but subsequently legitimated: (Note: No issue is given in Burke's Extinct Peerage to this second marriage of Sir Robert Walpole; but in Ancient Peerages is this: "Sir Robert Walpole married, in 1737, Maria, daughter and sole heir of Thomas Skerret, who died in 1738; he had a daughter from her before marriage, Maria, his Majesty's housekeeper at Windsor, and wife of Charles Churchill. She was legitimated, and given the rank of an Earl's daughter.")

- Maria Walpole, who after her legitimation acquired the style of the daughter of an earl, as Lady Maria Walpole. In 1746 she married Colonel Charles Churchill (1720–1812) of Chalfont, an illegitimate son of General Charles Churchill, and became the king's housekeeper at Windsor Castle. By Charles Churchill she had daughters including:
  - Sophia Churchill, who married her relative Horatio Walpole, 2nd Earl of Orford (1752–1822), of the third creation of that earldom, the son of Horatio Walpole, 1st Earl of Orford, son of Horatio Walpole, 1st Baron Walpole of Wolterton, 9th brother of Prime Minister Robert Walpole, 1st Earl of Orford.
  - Mary Churchill, who on 10 May 1777 became the second wife of Charles Cadogan, 1st Earl Cadogan (1728–1807), and had issue, before being divorced in 1796 by her husband for "criminal conversation" with Rev. Mr. Cooper.

== Arms ==
Coat of arms of Robert Walpole
Crest The bust of a man in profile couped proper, ducally crowned or, from the coronet flowing a long cap turned forwards gules tasselled and charged with a catherine wheel gold. Escutcheon Or, on a fess between. two chevrons sable, three crosses crosslet of the first. Supporters Dexter, an antelope; sinister, a stag argent, attired proper, each gorged with a collar chequy or and azure chained gold. Motto Fari quæ sentiat (To speak what he feels). Orders The Most Noble Order of the Garter - Knight Companion (KG).

== See also ==
- Baron Delamere
- List of prime ministers of the United Kingdom
- Marquess of Cholmondeley

== Sources ==
- "Walpole, Robert (WLPL695R)". A Cambridge Alumni Database. University of Cambridge.
- Aotes, Jonathan (April 2006). "Sir Robert Walpole after his fall from power, 1742–1745". History. 91 (302): 218–230. doi:10.1111/j.1468-229x.2006.00364.x.
- Brisco, Norris Arthur (10 September 2010). The Economic Policy of Robert Walpole. Kessinger Publishing. ISBN 978-1165094134.
- Browning, Reed (1975). The Duke of Newcastle. New Haven, CT: Yale University Press. ISBN 978-0-300-01746-5.
- Franklin, Colin (1993). Lord Chesterfield. His character and 'characters'. Aldershot: Scolar Press. p. 114.
- Hoppit, Julian (2000). A Land of Liberty? England 1689–1727.
- Kemp, Betty (18 March 1976). Sir Robert Walpole (1st ed.). Weidenfeld & Nicolson Ltd. ISBN 0297770675.
- Langford, Paul (1998). A Polite and Commercial People: England, 1727–1783. Oxford University Press. pp. 9–58. "Robin's Reign [on cover]"
- Leadam, Isaac Saunders (1899). Sir Robert Walpole – a short biography. Shamrock Eden – via Amazon.com.
- Leadam, Isaac Saunders (1899), "Walpole, Robert (1676–1745)" , in Lee, Sidney (ed.), Dictionary of National Biography, vol. 59, London: Smith, Elder & Co, pp. 178–207
- Morley, John (1 January 2019). Walpole: The First Prime Minister of Great Britain. IDB Productions. ISBN 978-1776791521.
- O'Gorman, Frank (1997). The Long Eighteenth Century: British political and social history 1688–1832.
- Pearce, Edward (2007). The Great Man: Sir Robert Walpole: Scoundrel, Genius and Britain's First Prime Minister. Jonathan Cape. ISBN 978-0-224-07181-9.
- Plumb, J. H. (1 January 1972). Sir Robert Walpole: The Making of a Statesman (1st ed.). Allen Lane. ISBN 0713902922.
- Speck, W. A. (1977). Stability and Strife: England 1714–1760.
- Taylor, Stephen (January 2008) [2004], "Walpole, Robert, first earl of Orford (1676–1745)", Oxford Dictionary of National Biography (online ed.), Oxford University Press, doi:10.1093/ref:odnb/28601 (Subscription, Wikipedia Library access or UK public library membership required.)
- Handley, Stuart; Rowe, M. J.; McBryde, W. H. (October 2007), "Pulteney, William, earl of Bath (1684–1764)", Oxford Dictionary of National Biography (online ed.), Oxford University Press, doi:10.1093/ref:odnb/22889 (Subscription, Wikipedia Library access or UK public library membership required.)

Parliament of England
Preceded by Robert Walpole; Thomas Howard	Member of Parliament for Castle Rising; 1701–1702; With: Thomas Howard 1701; Robert Cecil 1701; The Earl of Ranelagh 1701–1702; Marquess of Hartington 1702	Succeeded by Sir Thomas Littleton; Horatio Walpole
Parliament of Great Britain
Preceded by Sir John Turner; Sir Charles Turner	Member of Parliament for King's Lynn; 1702–1712; Served alongside: Sir Charles Turner	Succeeded by Sir Charles Turner; Sir John Turner
Preceded by Sir Charles Turner; Sir John Turner	Member of Parliament for King's Lynn; 1713–1742	Succeeded by Sir John Turner; Edward Bacon
Political offices
Preceded by Henry St John	Secretary at War; 1708–1710	Succeeded by George Granville
Preceded by Sir Thomas Littleton	Treasurer of the Navy; 1710–1711	Succeeded by Charles Caesar
Preceded by John Howe; Thomas Moore	Paymaster of the Forces; 1714–1715	Succeeded by The Earl of Lincoln
Preceded by The Earl of Carlisle	First Lord of the Treasury; 1715–1717	Succeeded by The Viscount Stanhope
Preceded by Sir Richard Onslow	Chancellor of the Exchequer; 1715–1717	Succeeded by The Viscount Stanhope
Preceded by The Earl of Lincoln	Paymaster of the Forces; 1720–1721	Succeeded by The Lord Cornwallis
First None recognised before	Prime Minister of Great Britain; 1721–1742	Succeeded by The Earl of Wilmington
Preceded by The Earl of Sunderland	First Lord of the Treasury; 1721–1742	Succeeded by The Earl of Wilmington
Preceded by Sir John Pratt	Chancellor of the Exchequer; 1721–1742	Succeeded by Samuel Sandys
Unknown	Leader of the House of Commons; 1721–1742	Succeeded by Samuel Sandys
Peerage of Great Britain
New creation	Earl of Orford; 2nd creation 1742–1745	Succeeded by Robert Walpole
New creation	Viscount Walpole; 1742–1745	Succeeded by Robert Walpole
New creation	Baron Walpole of Houghton; 1742–1745	Succeeded by Robert Walpole
