= Houghton Hall =

Country house in Norfolk, England

Coordinates: 52°49′37″N 0°39′27″E

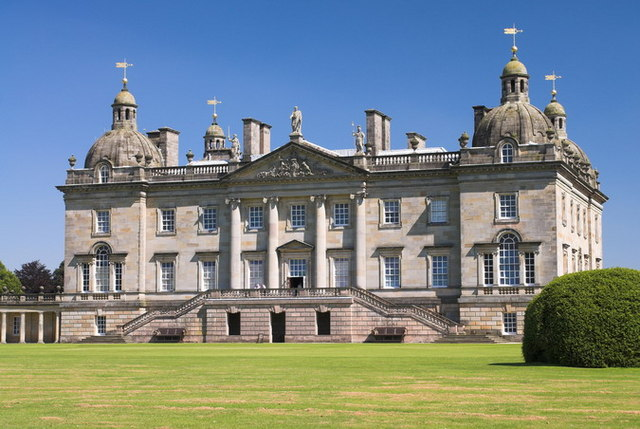
The façade of Houghton Hall in 2007

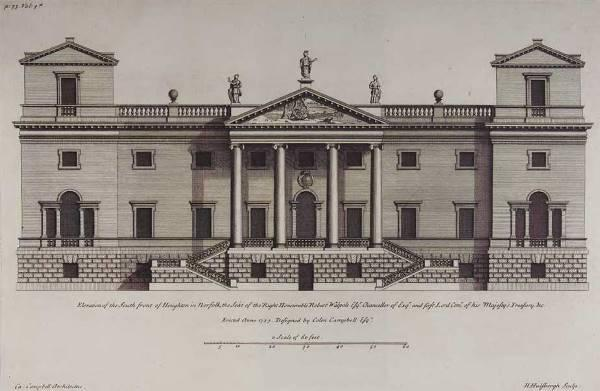
The façade of Houghton Hall from Colen Campbell's Vitruvius Britannicus. The corner towers were replaced with domes in the final design.

Houghton Hall (/ˈhaʊtən/ HOW-tən) is a country house in the parish of Houghton in Norfolk, England. It is the residence of the 7th Marquess of Cholmondeley.

It was commissioned by the de facto first British Prime Minister, Sir Robert Walpole, in 1722, and is a key building in the history of Neo-Palladian architecture in England. It is a Grade I listed building surrounded by 1,000 acres (4.0 km^{2}) of parkland, and is a few miles from Sandringham House.

== Description ==
The house has a rectangular main block which consists of a rusticated basement at ground level, with a piano nobile, a bedroom floor and attics above. Two lower flanking wings joined to the main block by colonnades. To the south of the house is a detached quadrangular stable block.

The exterior, built of fine-grained, silver-white stone, is both grand and restrained. Domes designed by James Gibbs, mark each corner of the main block. In keeping with Palladian conventions, the interiors are much more colourful, exuberant and opulent than the exteriors.

The park surrounding Houghton Hall was redesigned in the 18th century by Charles Bridgeman. In the process, the village of Houghton was demolished, except for the medieval Church of St Martin, rebuilt at the main gates of the park. The church stands alone in the park.

== History ==
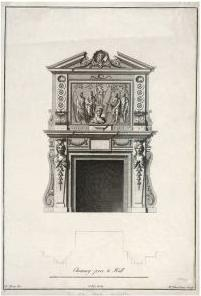
Chimneypiece from The Plans, Elevations and Sections, Chimney-pieces and Ceilings [sic] of Houghton in Norfolk, 1735 V&A Museum no. 13095

=== Design and construction ===
This new building was placed on the site of earlier Walpole family houses. Sir Robert Walpole had inherited the property and its associated 17,000-acre (6,900 ha) estate in 1700. He had commissioned some upgrades, but in 1720 commissioned Thomas Badeslade to survey the house and its immediate block of land, which included a garden in the style of Stephen Switzer.

Although Palladian in style, the exact timeline and style of the architecture and design are disputed. It is most likely that Walpole initially instructed his friend Thomas Ripley to head the design, having appointed him surveyor in 1722 when construction started, with his apprentice Isaac Ware employed in the Works Office and Robert Hardy as Clerk of Works. The first stone was laid on 24 May 1722, and by 7 December that year the brick cellars had been completed and the first stone course laid.

Colen Campbell is the architect most credited with the design. However, later research indicates that his first works on it dates from 1723 (Old Style), which is March 1723 in the modern calendar. Campbell can be connected to the project, but his initial and later designs show his preferred Wilton-style towers, as published by him in Vitruvius Britannicus in 1725. However, the final design of the tower domes was undertaken by James Gibbs, with: the south-west tower dated 1725; the south-east 1727; and the others dated from 1729. Both the interior and exterior were extravagant, later estimated by Walpole himself to have cost over £200,000; he admitted to burning most of the receipts, adding further to the difficulty of verifying the architecture timeline. The best materials and designers were employed, including William Kent who designed the ceilings for the reception areas and ground floor, as well as some furniture. In the context of the day, Campbell, Gibbs, and Kent were not just rivals but very much disliked each other. Ripley's own records show that he took a larger role in the project during the later stages of construction of the external edifices, with his drawings showing him greatly altering the earlier works of both Campbell and Gibbs.

=== Ownership ===
Walpole was an extravagant host; hunting parties with local Norfolk gentry would last for weeks at a time. Visits from royalty were common and his fellow politicians, particularly members of his Cabinet, held their meetings each spring over a three-week period in the rooms at Houghton. These meetings were known as the Norfolk Congress. A grand Palladian pile, Houghton was intended to be the permanent home for more than 400 of his Old Master paintings, including works by Van Dyck, Poussin, Rubens, Rembrandt and Velázquez.

Sir Robert Walpole became the 1st Earl of Orford in 1742. Ownership passed to his son and grandson, the second and third earls. On the death of the third earl in 1791, it reverted to Sir Robert Walpole's youngest son and uncle of the 3rd Earl, Horace Walpole, who became the 4th Earl of Orford. Sir Robert and his successors as Earls of Orford are buried in St Martin's Church nearby.

On his death in 1797, possession passed to the family of his sister, Lady Mary, Countess of Cholmondeley, who had died aged just 26 more than 65 years earlier in 1731. She had married George Cholmondeley, 3rd Earl of Cholmondeley and Houghton Hall has been modified and maintained by her Cholmondeley family descendants to the present day. Colonel Robert Walpole borrowed a book about the Archbishop of Bremen from the Sidney Sussex College library in 1667 or 1668. The overdue library book was discovered at Houghton in the mid-1950s, and returned 288 years late.

=== Present day ===
The house, including the north and south attachments, was designated as Grade I listed in 1953.

Houghton has remained largely untouched, having remained "unimproved" despite the Victorian passion for remodelling and redecorating, due to the fact that for most of the 19th century the family lived mainly at Cholmondeley Castle in Cheshire, and only stayed at Houghton for the shooting. Houghton still belongs to the current Marquess of Cholmondeley, and parts of the structure and grounds are opened to the public throughout the year.

=== Art ===
Houghton once contained part of Sir Robert Walpole's great picture collection, which his grandson the 3rd Earl sold in 1779 to Catherine the Great of Russia to pay off some of the estate's accumulated debt. Included in the current collection of paintings is Thomas Gainsborough's oil painting of his own family, Thomas Gainsborough, with His Wife and Elder Daughter, Mary (circa 1751–52).

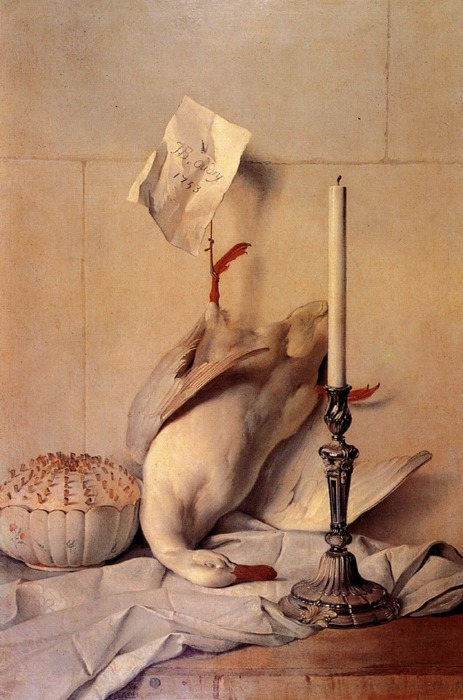
Jean-Baptiste Oudry's The White Duck, which was stolen from Houghton Hall in 1990

Walpole's collection of marble Roman busts was also considerable.

In the early 1990s, Hans Holbein's Lady with a Squirrel and a Starling (1528) was removed from the walls of Houghton where it had hung since 1780. It was put up for auction to raise money to pay inheritance taxes and for maintenance of the house and grounds; and eventually, negotiations led to the painting's sale to the National Gallery for £17 million tax free because of special incentives in England for selling works of art that are considered national treasures.

In the 21st century, art market inflation has placed enormous temptations in the way of the old families with substantial collections. In recent years, ownership of several pieces have been transferred in lieu of tax from the Cholmondeleys to the Victoria and Albert Museum. A major sale of items of pictures, furniture, silver and objets d'art from Houghton estimated at $23 million was held at Christie's in London on 8 December 1994, with the intention of establishing an endowment fund for the future preservation of the building. Some artwork, such as William Hogarth's portrait of the Cholmondeley family is unlikely to be let go, and it remains on view at Houghton; but the Marquess admits that he is very aware that risk of theft is neither negligible nor negotiable. Jean-Baptiste Oudry's White Duck, stolen from the Cholmondeley collection in 1990, is still missing.

=== Parkland and gardens ===
Charles Bridgeman's landscaping plan for the parkland at Houghton remains intact. His "twisting wilderness paths" were cleared in the early 18th century; and they have been maintained since then. The park, which extends into Bircham and Harpley parishes, was designated Grade I on the National Register of Historic Parks and Gardens in 1987.

Bridgeman replaced the formal geometry of intersecting avenues with blocks of woodland and parkland which, as he saw it, was better able to complement the hall's compelling architectural statement. Tree-lined vistas in four directions are aligned on the Hall.

Cross-section of a sunken ha-ha barrier like the ones laid out by Charles Bridgeman at Houghton Hall

The ha-ha barriers at Houghton were an innovative feature credited to Bridgeman. In his 1780 Essay upon Modern Gardening, Horace Walpole explained: "The contiguous ground of the park without the sunk fence was to be harmonized with the lawn within; and the garden in its turn was to be set free from its prim regularity, that it might assort with the wilder country without."

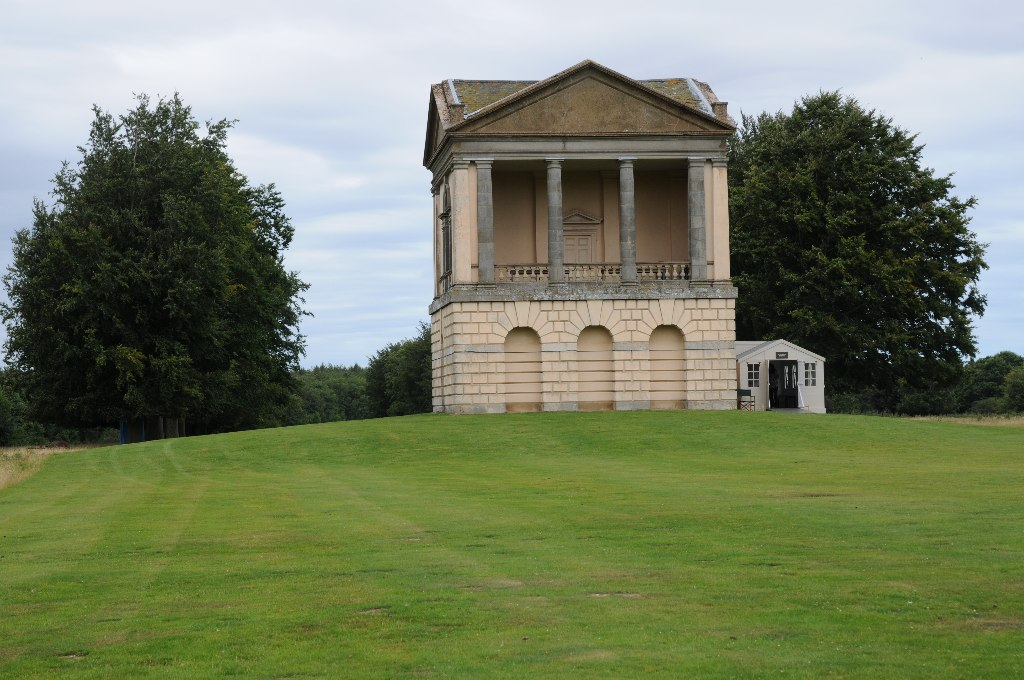
The Water Tower

Sir Robert Walpole constructed a watertower (1731–32) with the appearance of an architectural folly which was designed by the 9th Earl of Pembroke. It was restored in 1982 and is a Grade I listed building.

In this well-established context, a number of contemporary outdoor sculptures have been commissioned in recent years by the 7th Marquess of Cholmondeley. To the west of the house is a circle of Cornish slate at the end of a path mown through the grass. This land art feature was designed by the British sculptor Richard Long.

Two modern follies lie in a wooded area to the side of the west front.

American artist James Turrell contrived Skyspace for Houghton. Turrell's construction presents itself from the exterior as an oak-clad building raised on stilts. From the inside of the structure, the viewer's point of view is focused upwards and inevitably lured into contemplating the sky as framed by the open roof.

"The Sybil Hedge" is another folly in this vicinity. It is based on the signature of the current marquis' grandmother, Sybil Sassoon. Scottish artist Anya Gallaccio has created a sarcophagus-like marble structure which is sited at the end of a path; and nearby is a copper-beech hedge which is planted in lines mirroring Sybil's signature.

A 5-acre (20,000 m^{2}) walled kitchen garden lies beyond the stables. Over the course of time, the productive area was reduced in size, and the enclosure was mostly grassed over. In 1996, the fallow enclosure was redesigned and replanted. The effort was rewarded in 2007 when it was named Historic Houses Association and Christie's Garden of the Year. Yew hedges divide the space into a formal grid of discrete areas or "rooms", each intending to provoke a different interest and mood. The hedges, some cut in swags, give height and form. The garden rooms include an Italian enclosure with box parterres; a formal rose garden laid out in a pattern based on one of the William Kent ceilings in the house; a French garden of pleached limes and plum trees which have been underplanted with spring bulbs; and a croquet lawn.

Danish artist Jeppe Hein created a Water Flame sculpture/fountain for this garden. In all seasons, this jet of water surmounted by a ball of flame illustrates a 21st-century folly on a smaller scale than the contemporary pieces outside the garden walls.

In 2015, James Turrell created an artistic illumination of Houghton House as part of the LightScape festival celebrating the house and gardens.

=== Horse trials ===
The Houghton International Horse Trials have been held in the park annually in May since 2007. National events run alongside the three-day international event.

=== Model soldiers ===
The stable block at Houghton Hall houses the Cholmondeley Collection of Model Soldiers, previously at Cholmondeley Castle and moved to Houghton Hall in 1980 soon after it was opened to the public. The collection was started in 1928 by the 6th Marquess, expanded throughout his life, and now includes about 20,000 figures.

== See also ==
- Treasure Houses of Britain
- Noble Households
