= Houghton, Norfolk =

Village in Norfolk, England

Coordinates: 52.818°N 0.656°E

Houghton
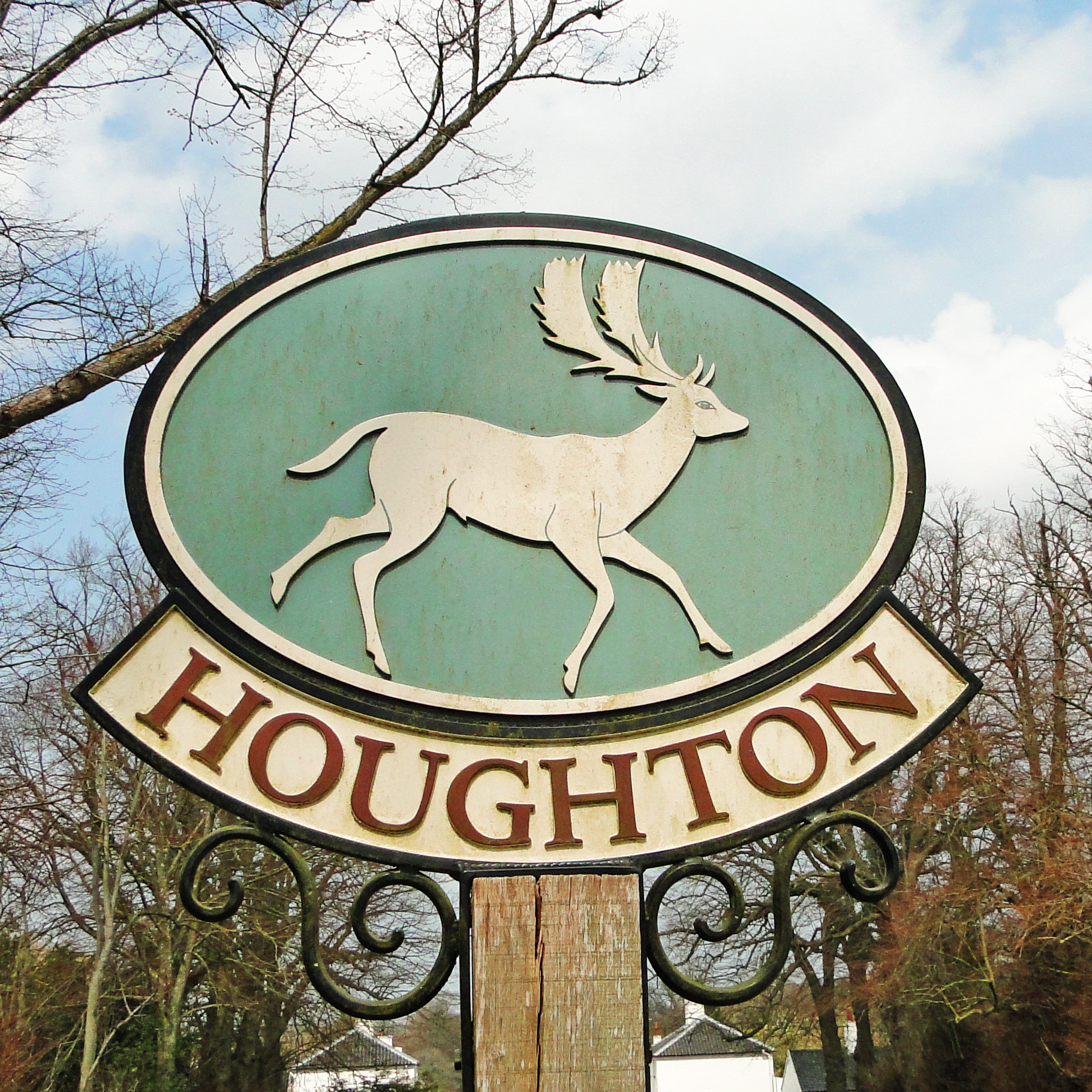
- Houghton Village Sign

- Location within Norfolk
- Area: 2.95 sq mi (7.6 km^{2})
- OS grid reference: TF791278
- Civil parish: Houghton
- District: King's Lynn and West Norfolk
- Shire county: Norfolk
- Region: East
- Country: England
- Sovereign state: United Kingdom
- Post town: KING'S LYNN
- Postcode district: PE31
- Dialling code: 01485
- UK Parliament: North West Norfolk

Houghton is a village and a civil parish in the English county of Norfolk.

Houghton is located 11 miles (18 km) north-east of King's Lynn and 30 miles (48 km) north-west of Norwich.

The parish church is St Martin at Tours' Church, Houghton

== History ==
Houghton's name is of Anglo-Saxon origin and derives from the Old English for hill-spur farmstead.

In the Domesday Book, Houghton is recorded as a settlement of 10 households in the hundred of Brothercross. In 1086, the village was part of the East Anglian estates of William de Warenne.

== Geography ==
At the 2021 census, the population of the parish was below 100, and was therefore included in the civil parish of West Rudham.

== Houghton Hall ==
Houghton Hall was built between 1722 and 1735 as the country residence of Sir Robert Walpole, the first Prime Minister of Great Britain, in the Palladian style. Today, Houghton Hall is the residence of Lord David Cholmondeley, who often opens the house to the public.

The old village of Houghton was demolished in 1722 to make way for the construction of Houghton Hall and the associated parkland. In 1729, the village was rebuilt on the edge of the estate and called New Houghton. It is one of the locations claimed to be the inspiration for Oliver Goldsmith's poem The Deserted Village.

== Governance ==
Houghton is part of the electoral ward of Bircham with Rudhams for local elections and is part of the district of King's Lynn and West Norfolk.

The village's national constituency is North West Norfolk which has been represented by the Conservative's James Wild MP since 2010.
