= Mannington Hall =

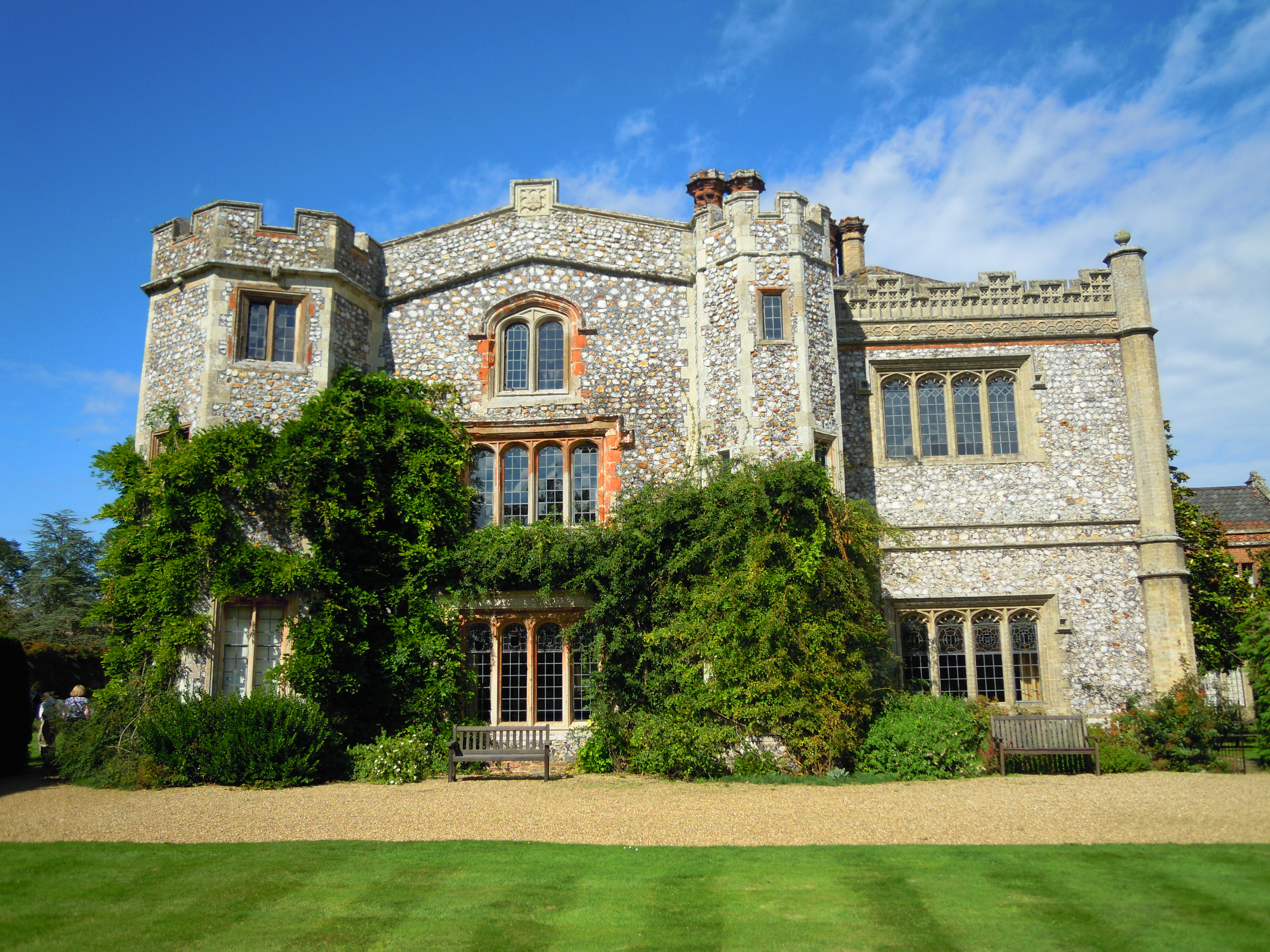
- The south facade

- Location within Norfolk

General information
- Type: Historic house
- Architectural style: Medieval, Moated great house
- Location: Near Itteringham, Norfolk, NR11 7BB, England
- Coordinates: 52.842864°N 1.181826°E
- Completed: 1464
- Renovated: 1864
- Cost: £20.000
- Client: Horatio Walpole, 1st Baron Walpole

Technical details
- Structural system: Iron stained flints and knapped flints. Pantile roof

Mannington Hall is a moated medieval country house in the civil parish of Itteringham near the village of the same name and is in the English county of Norfolk within the United Kingdom. The first manor house built on this site was constructed in the 15th century. Having been owned by the Walpole family since the 18th century, since 2025 it is owned by the Ellis family.

The house is only open to the public by appointment. The gardens however are open in the summer on Wednesdays, Thursdays, Fridays and Sundays.

== Etymology ==
The name Mannington devolved from the Anglo-Saxon language and has the meaning of the enclosure (tun or ton) owned by the people (ing or ingus) of Manna’s.

== History ==
Mannington is mentioned in the Domesday Book of 1086. In the great Survey it is under the name Manctura. Before 1066 the manor had been held by Godwin but at the time of the survey it was held by the King and the Norman nobleman William de Warenne. There stood on the site an ancient house which in 1291, after many changes came into the possession of Maude Turrell who was the daughter and heiress of Walter Turrell of Mannington and Itteringham. She married a man called Walter Hewell who also had an alias of Dennell. By her own right Maude was lord of the manor and when she married her second husband, Henry Lumner (also spelt Lumnor), he also was lord of the manor. Their grandson, also Henry, took possession of the house and manor in 1401, and held it in right of his late wife, the heiress of Maude Dennell. Henry died shortly after and the land and possessions passed to his son and heir, William Lumner. He in turn left it to his son, also William Lumner, who decided to rebuild Mannington Hall as the house that stands today.

This William Lumner was the brother of Margaret Paston and a trusted friend of the Paston family.

In a letter to John Paston dated 1460, Lumnor invited his friend Paston to visit his new house if he was in the area. In the same letter Lumnor asks Paston to supply him with Oak from the Paston estate to use on his new house at Mannington. In Nikolaus Pevsner’s Buildings of England, North-east Norfolk and Norwich, he claims that a licence to crenellate was obtained by Lumnor in 1451. However this is incorrect, Mannington was never built under such a licence. Lumnor had set several small guns on his battlements which he had constructed from stone and black knapped flint. Inside the house on the wooden wall covering or wainscot he installed his family coat of arms of Lumner impaling Monivaux. The construction of the house was completed by 1460 and William Lumnor died around 1491.

After being in the possession of several generations the Lumnor family, they sold the house and estate to the Potts family in 1585.

The Potts family

Prior to their purchase of the estate the Potts family had been established in Mannington for many generations. Records show that in the year 1274 a man from Manningham called William Potts was sued by a William Tirrell for encroaching and appropriating to himself the fee of a certain highway extending from Mannington to the river Cam. When the hall came into the possession of John Potts he was a student in Lincoln's Inn; he later became a lawyer of eminence and reputation. He was married to Anne Dogge, daughter of John Dodge. He died in 1600 and is buried in the parish church of Saint Mary (now in ruins).

John Potts' son was also called John and was elected Member of Parliament for Norfolk in the Long Parliament. He was knighted by King Charles I and was created a baronet by letters dated on 14 August 1641. Despite being honoured by the King he was a staunch Parliamentarian. He became a great friend of Oliver Cromwell. Cromwell visited Potts on numerous occasions whilst staying at the nearby Irmingland Hall, Oulton, the home of Lt General Charles Fleetwood. Even though he supported the Parliamentarian side during the Civil war he was eventually excluded from Parliament under Pride's Purge in 1648. Potts returned to Parliament in 1660 when he was elected MP for Great Yarmouth in the Convention Parliament.

During the 1720s the Potts family's fortunes were ruined following the share collapse of the South Sea Company known as the South Sea Bubble. The Potts carried on living at Mannington hall until 1736 when the wife of Sir John Potts (who had died in 1731) died in February 1736. They had no children and due to the financial difficulties, the manor and township with the patronage was sold. It was all purchased for the sum of £20,000 by Horatio Walpole, who owned the adjoining estate of Wolterton Hall.

The Walpole family

Horatio Walpole was the younger brother of Robert Walpole, 1st Earl of Orford, who was a British statesman who is generally regarded as the first Prime Minister of Great Britain. Like his brother, Horatio was also a politician and diplomat, and spend time at the Hague and had also been the Ambassador of France in Paris between 1724 and 1730. When Horatio purchased Mannington from the Potts he was in the process of building himself a new house at Wolterton and has been suggested that the acquiring of the nearby estate of Mannington was to extend the Wolterton estate in to Mannington and to use the hall as a Dower house or possibly a farmhouse. Evidently it was the very low importance that Horatio placed on the hall and its lack of re-development that allowed to go virtually unaltered from the time of the Potts ownership.

Manninghton eventually became the main home to the Walpoles when Horatio's great-great-grandson Horatio Walpole, 4th Earl of Orford, inherited the two estates in 1858. Horatio the fourth had an interest in antiquity and in gothic architecture and he also thought that Mannington would make a better family home than the grand and formal house at Wolterton. He moved to Mannington and began to make improvements and alteration immediately. During this period of renovation the house was elaborated with architectural features from other Walpole owned properties.

The house and estate was passed on to Robert Walpole, 5th Earl of Orford, who was the last Earl of Orford and lived at Mannington from 1895 until 1905 when he moved back to Wolterton Hall. Walpole let the house to the consulting dental surgeon Sir Charles Tomes, and a Fellow of the Royal Society. During the First World War, Tomes was the chairman of the Norfolk and Norwich Hospital. He also published a book in 1916 called Mannington Hall and its owners, which he wrote with the help of Robert Walpole.

Barons Walpole of Walpole

In 1931 the estates of Wolterton and Mannington were left to Robert Walpole, the 9th Baron Walpole of Walpole (who was related to Robert Horace Walpole the fifth through the 1st Earl Orford). He chose to live at Wolterton Hall, so in 1969 his son Robert took up residence in Mannington Hall. Robert Horatio Walpole became the 10th Baron Walpole on the death of his father in 1989 and died there in 2021.

The Ellis family

In 2025, Mannington Hall was sold to local businessman Richard Ellis and his family. They had already acquired neighbouring Wolterton Hall in 2023.

== Description ==
The hall is surrounded on all sides by a moat and in plan is oblong in shape with dimensions of 80.2 feet (24.4 m) by 40.0 feet (12.2 m) At the southern end of the house there are two polygonal angled towers with the south west tower being larger than the other. The smaller tower on the south east corner contains a staircase linking the three storeys of the hall. The main entrance to the hall is on the west elevation. This main door is reached by the use of a wood pedestrian drawbridge with a wrought Iron Balustrade either side. The west elevation features a variety of sized mullioned windows with cusped tops. On the south elevation of the hall there are large mullioned windows. The eastern elevation incorporates the main body of the hall via a link building projecting west which according to Nikolaus Pevsner was the kitchen. Link to this projection and running north there is a range of two-storey brick and flint domestic and utility buildings with a set of four gable fronted dormer with mullioned windows. The north elevation faces a courtyard which is accessed via a Grade II listed bridge. The courtyard is bordered to the east by the rear of the two-storey domestic block. To the west of the courtyard is a Grade II listed wall and a lower flint wall to the north. The main body of the hall is built using alternating courses of knapped flint and iron-stained flint with ashlar dressings. Many of the window mullions and revels are carved from the local carrstone which is found in the north west of Norfolk. The exterior walls of the hall are topped with crenellations or Battlements at the roofline. The roof is covered with Norfolk pantiles and has various chimneys which were added in the mid-19th century, of which some have been salvaged from other Walpole properties.

On 20 February 1952 Mannington Hall was designated a Grade I listed building, and it has English Heritage List entry number 1001009.

== Public access ==
Mannington Hall estate is open every day of the year for the public to use the country walks around the estate at no cost although there is a charge for the car park. The gardens are open on a Sunday between 12 pm and 5 pm on Sundays between may and September. In June, July and August the gardens are also open on Thursday and Fridays between 11 am and 5 pm. The house is only open to the public by pre-arranged appointments and to special interest groups and on special events.

== Gallery ==
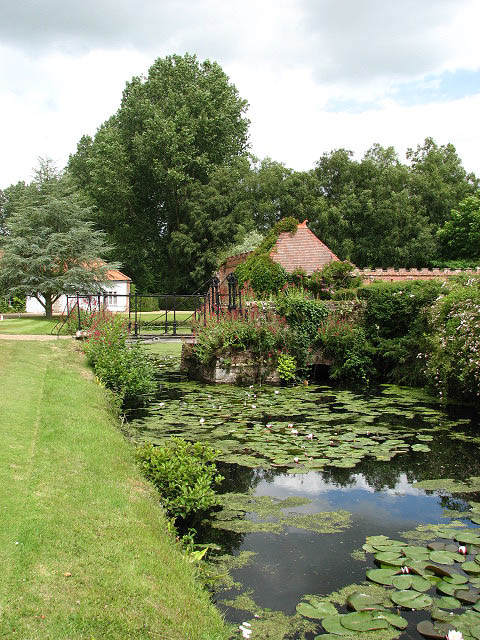
The Drawbridge and moat on the western side of the hall.

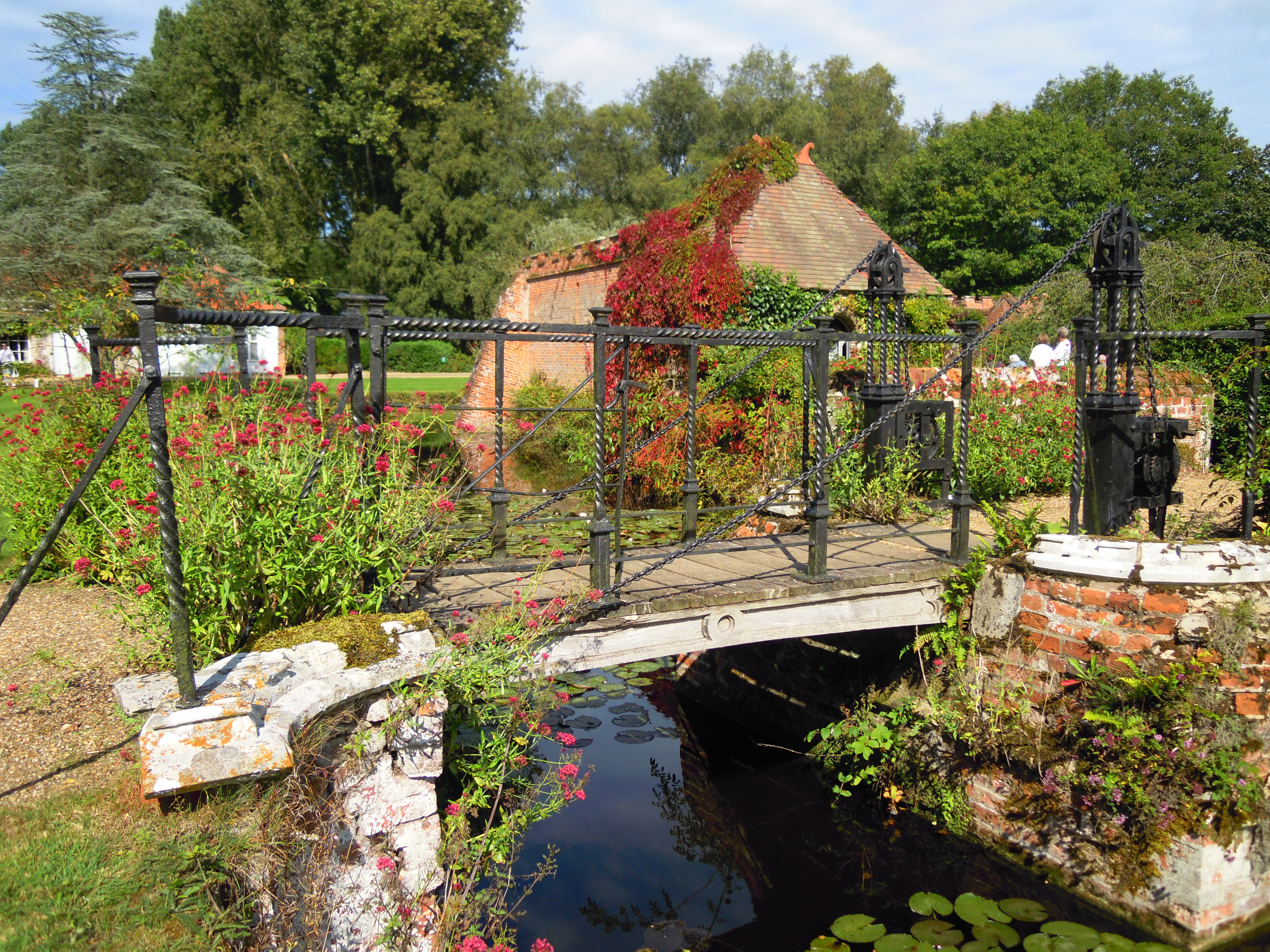
Closer view of the drawbridge

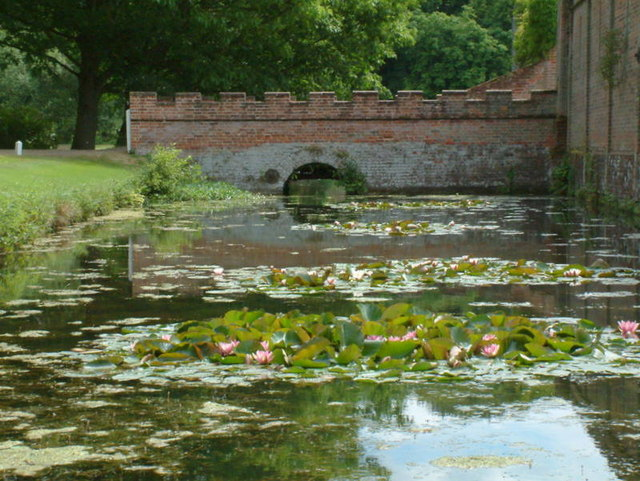
The bridge across the moat on to the north of the hall

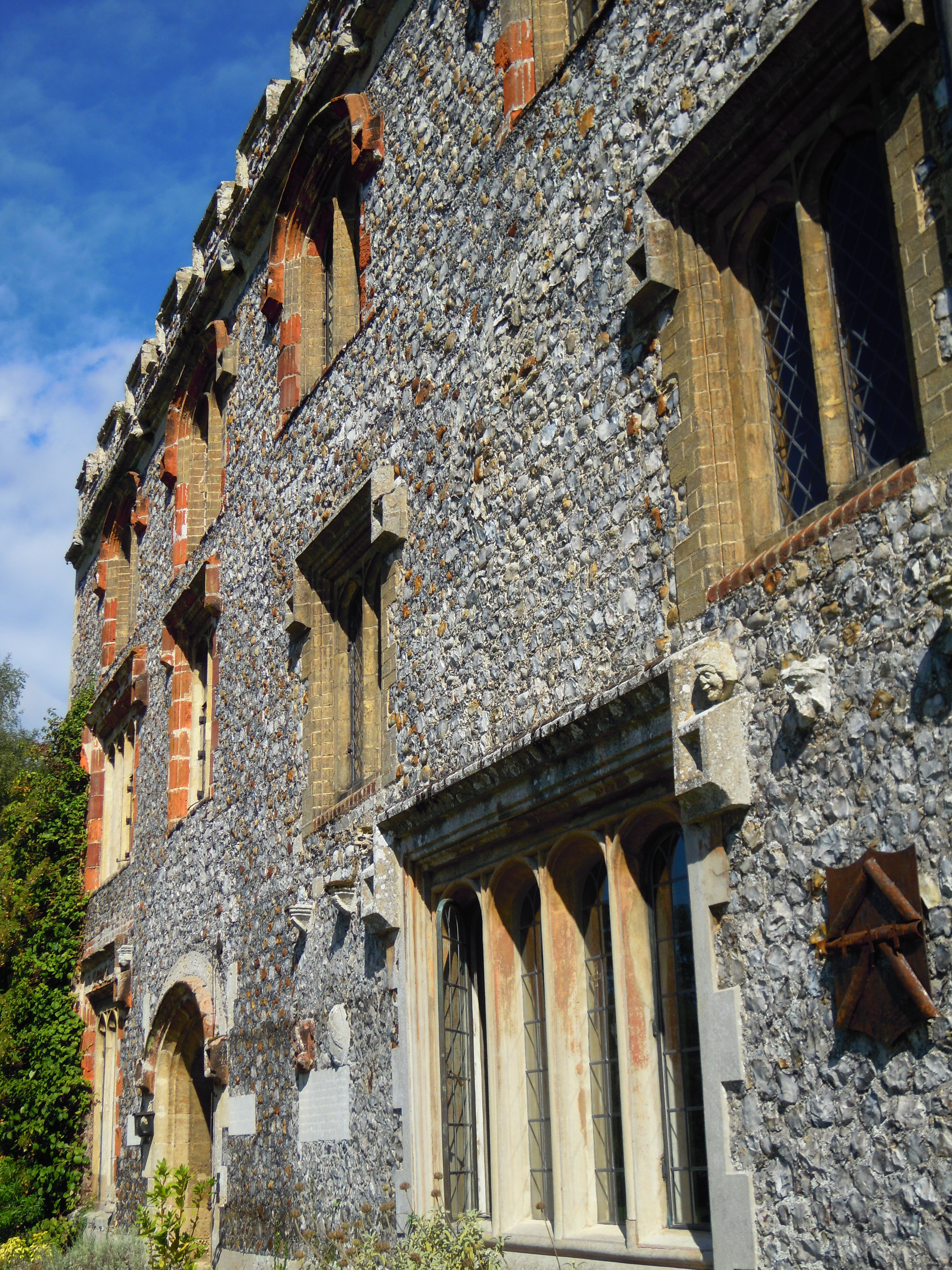
The west-facing facade.

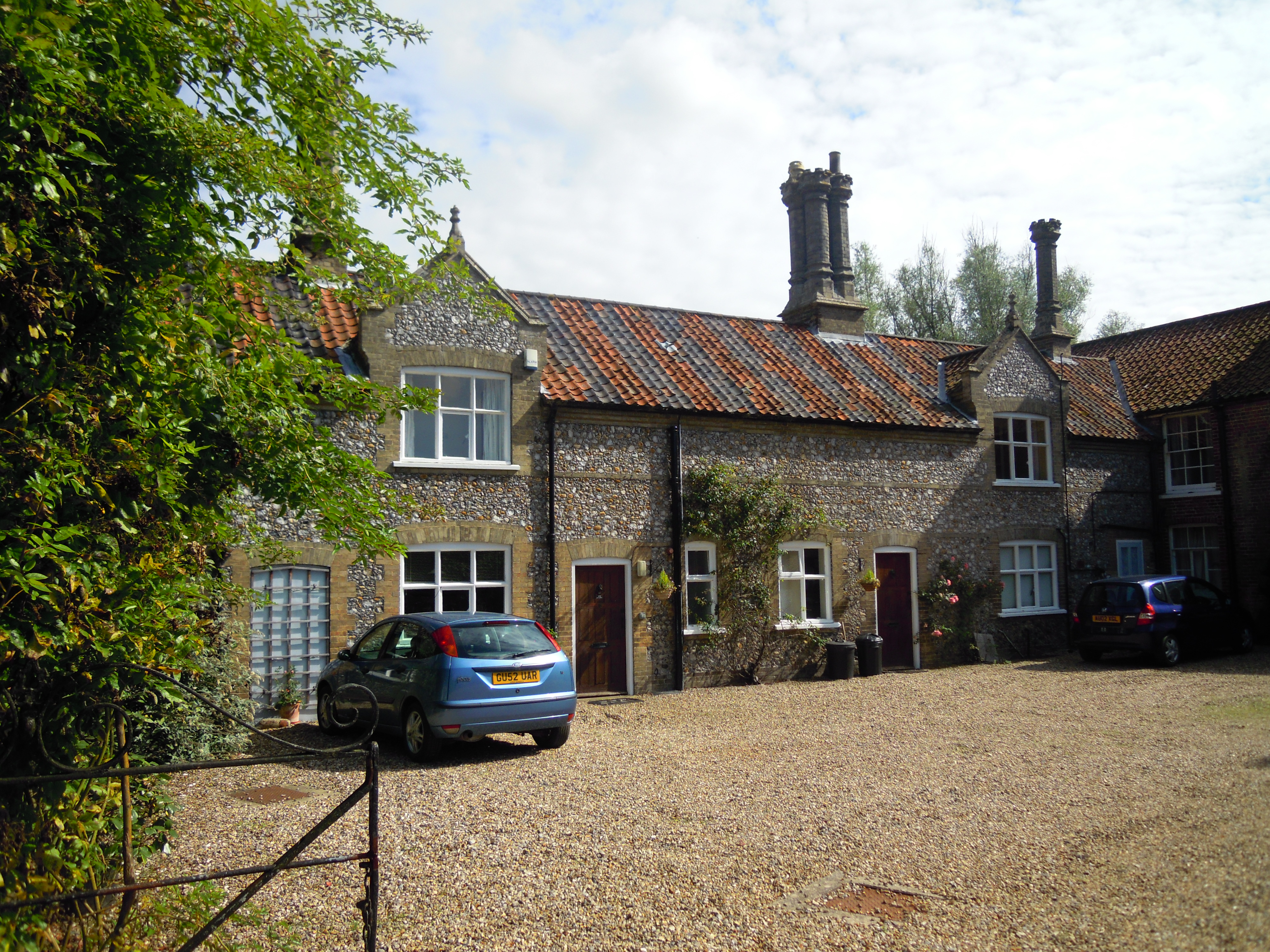
The service buildings on the east range of the hall.

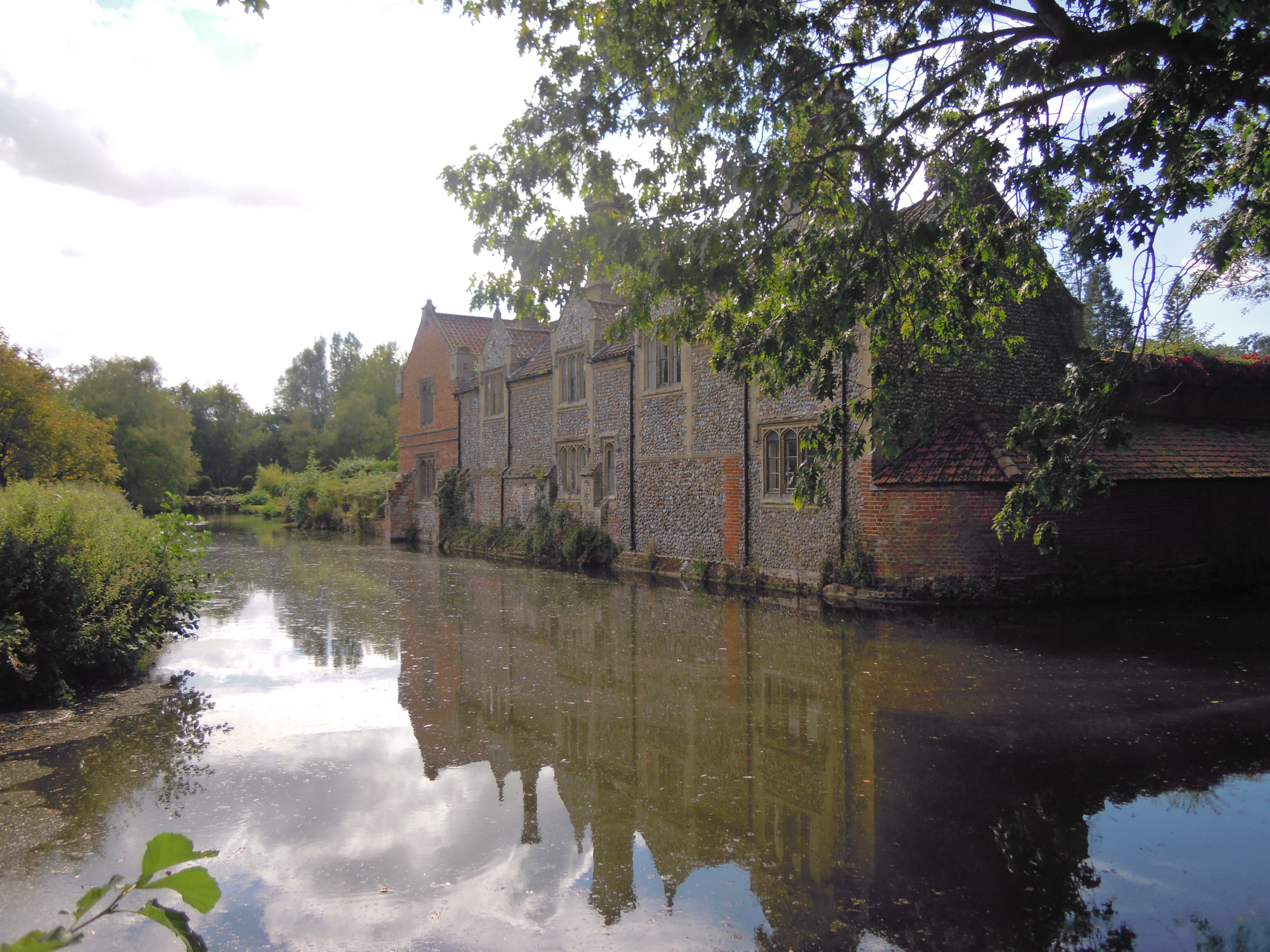
The east-facing facade and the moat.

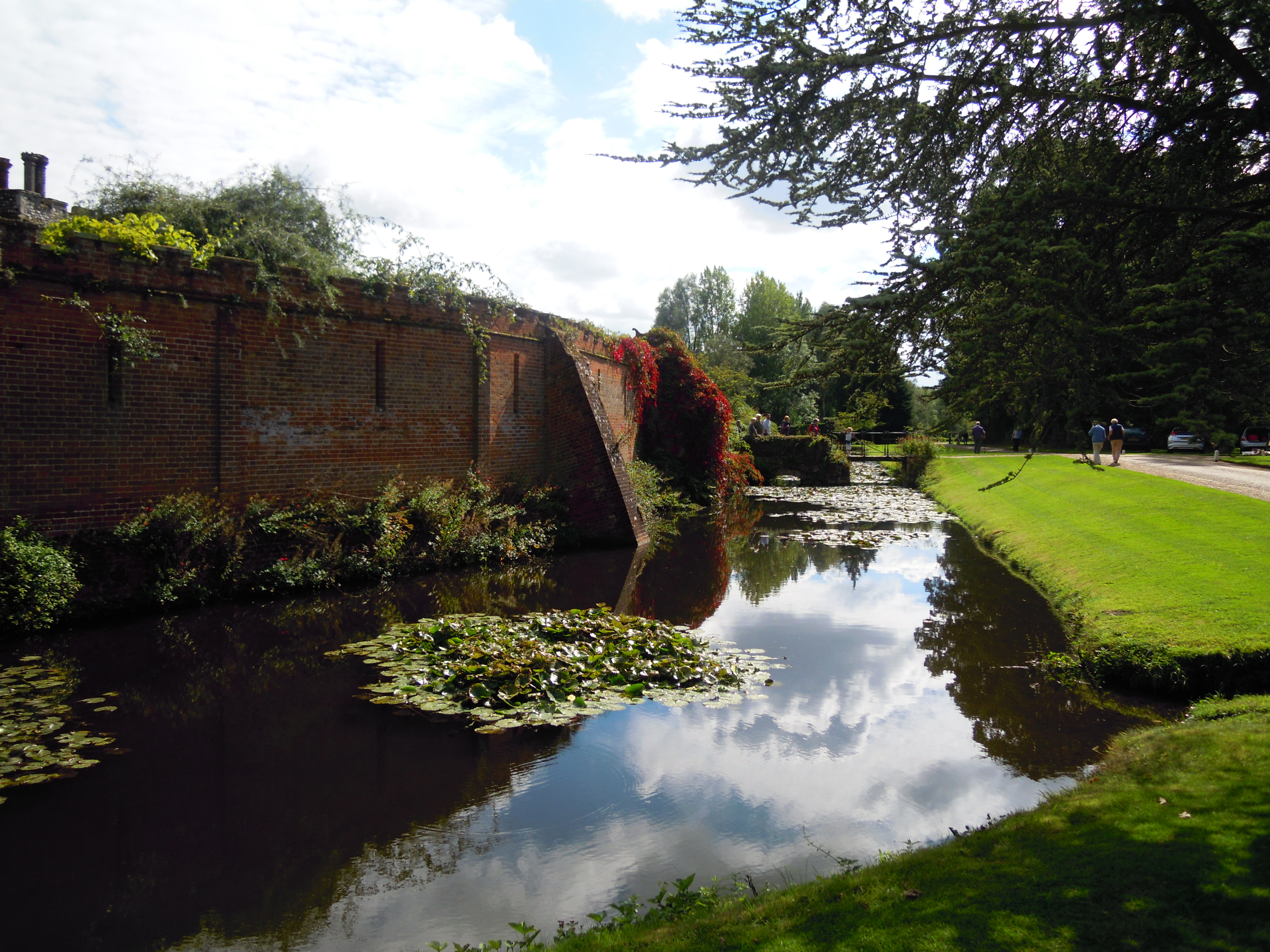
The moat on the west side of the hall.

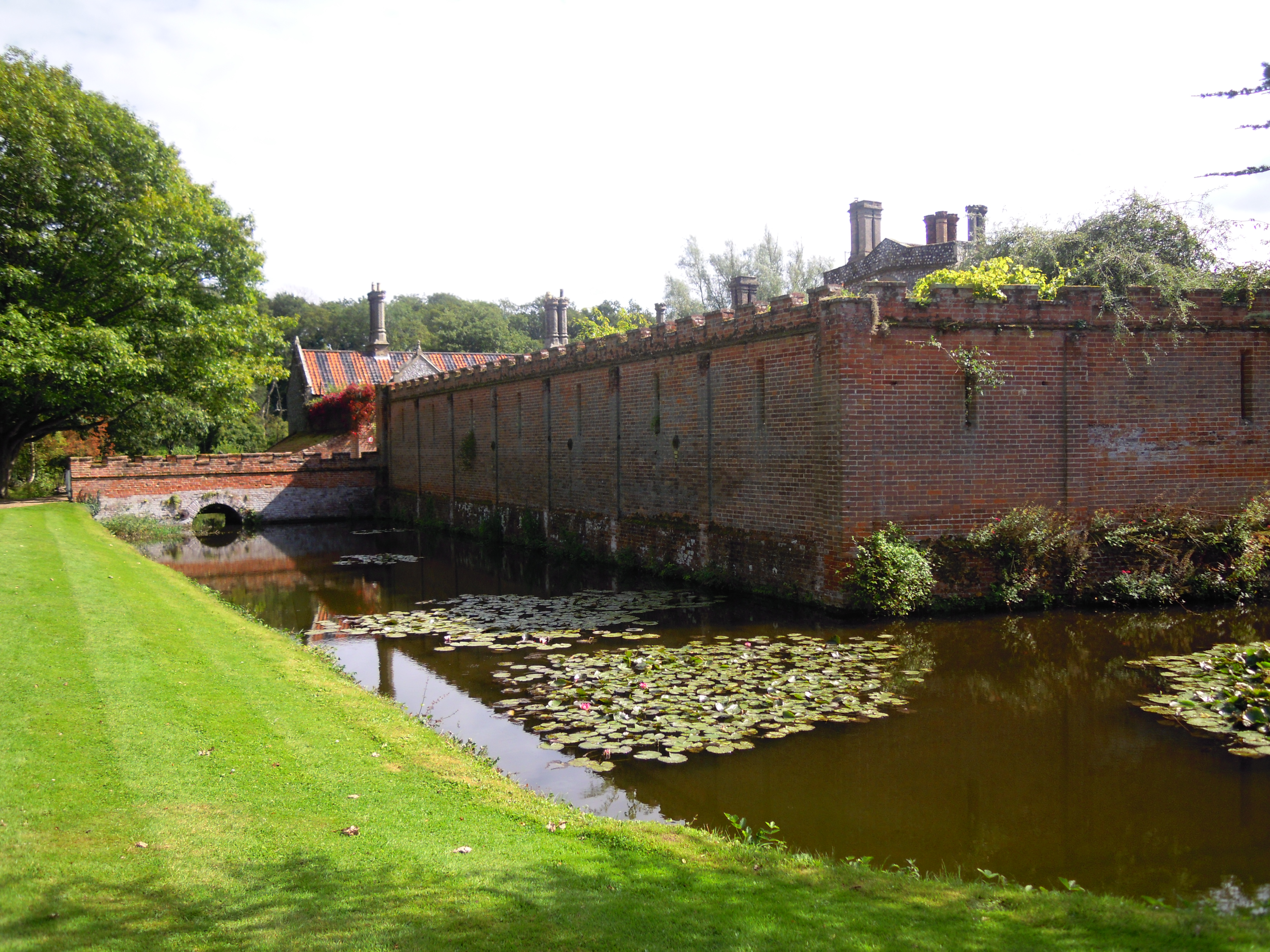
The north west corner of the hall's boundary wall.

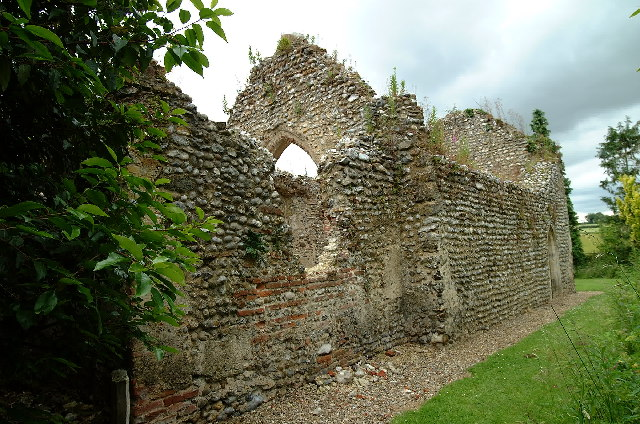
The ruins of Saint Mary’s Church, Mannington

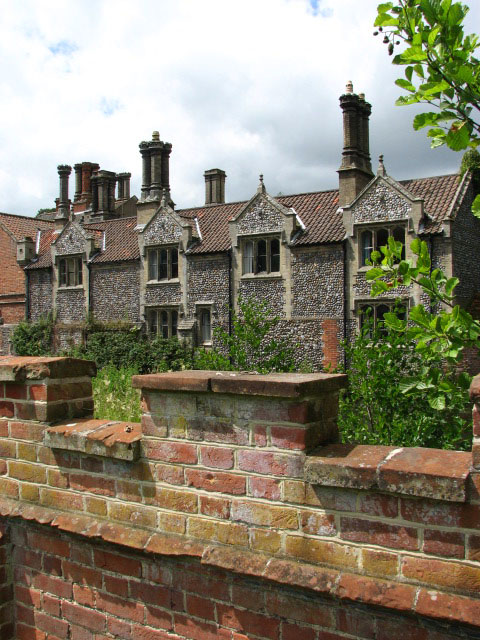
The east elevation of the hall

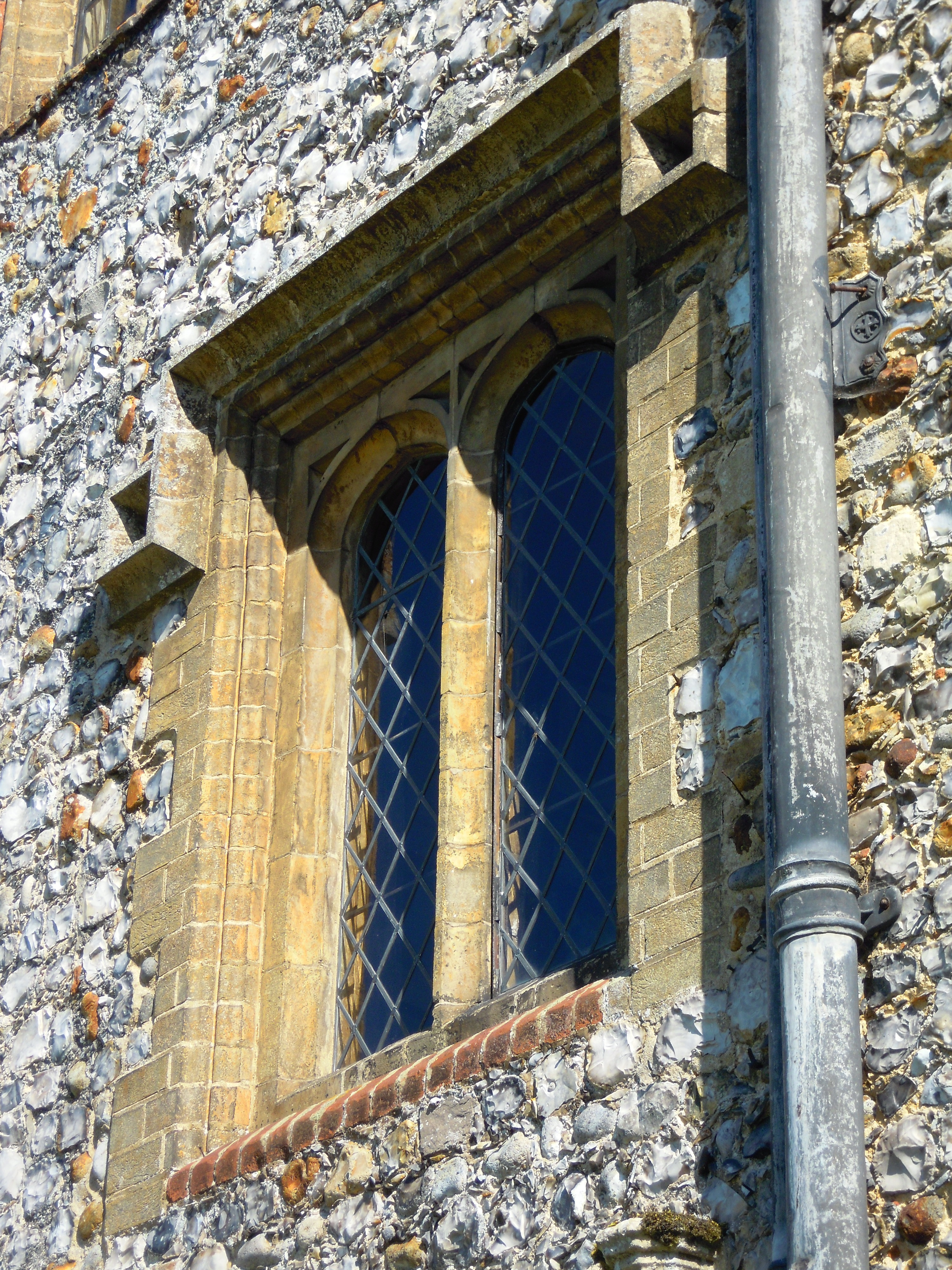
Window detail on the west facade.

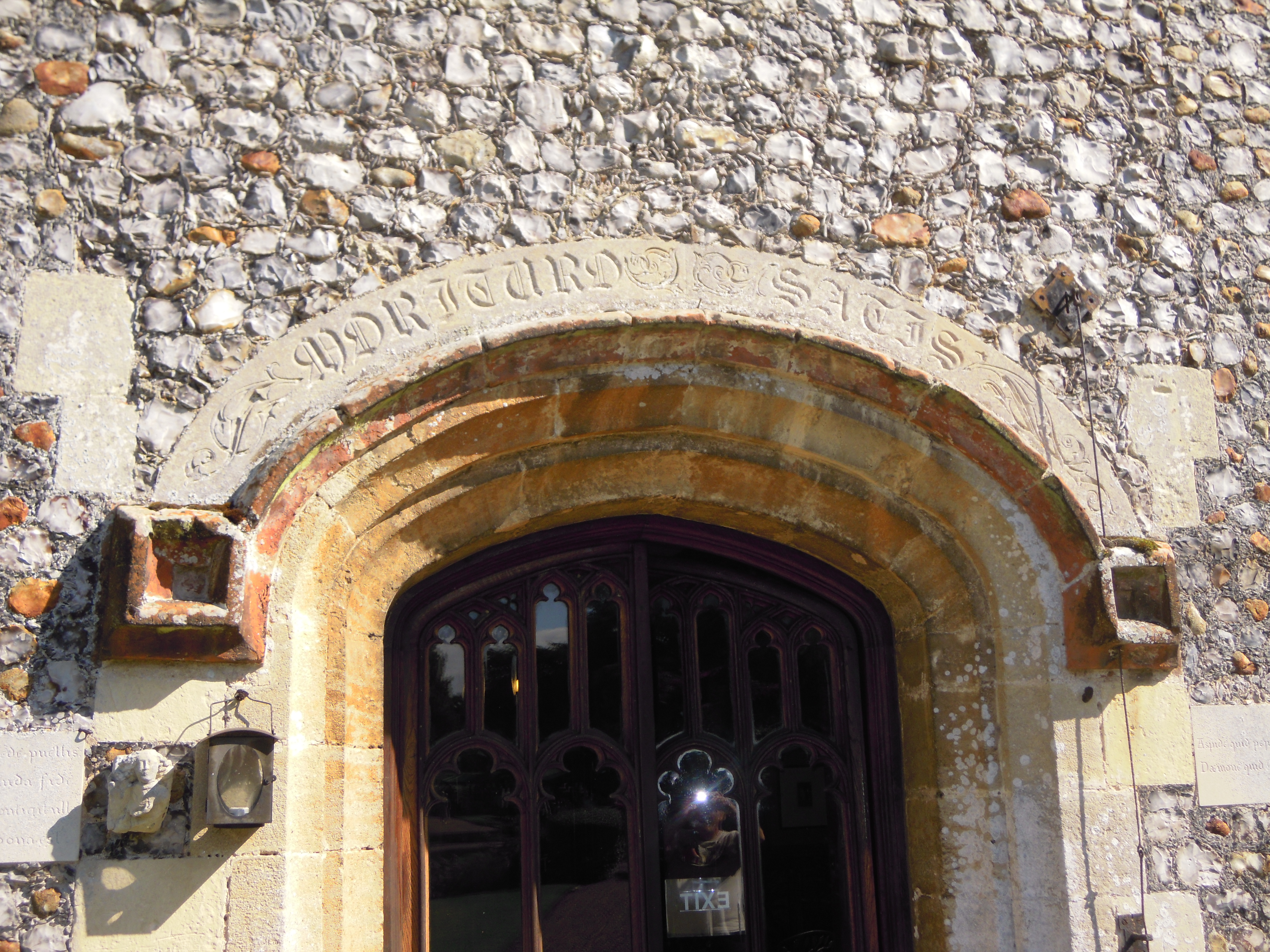
Arch with inscription over the main door, on the west facade.
