= Alice Egerton =

Alice Egerton may refer to:

- Alice Spencer, Countess of Derby (1559–1637), later Egerton, English noblewoman
- Alice Vaughan, Countess of Carbery (1619–1689), formerly Alice Egerton
- Lady Alice Egerton (1923–1977), British noblewoman
