= Thomas Grantham (Baptist) =

English theologian, minister, and author (1634–1692)

The Reverend Thomas Grantham
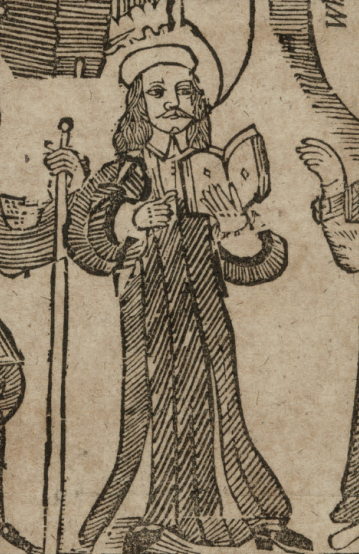
- Engraving of Thomas Grantham
- Born: January 1634; Halton Holegate, Lincolnshire, Kingdom of England
- Died: 17 January 1692 (aged 58); Norwich, Norfolk, Kingdom of England
- Occupations: Minister; Theologian; Author; Husbandman
- Notable work: Christianismus Primitivus; St Paul's Catechism
- Spouse: Bridget
- Children: Thomas; Abner
- Theological work
- Main interests: Credobaptism, systematic theology, Church history
- Notable ideas: Via Media of congregational and presbyterian polity,

Thomas Grantham (January 1634 – 17 January 1692) was an English General Baptist divine (theologian), minister, and author. Grantham was one of the leading theologians for English Baptists and made petitions on behalf of the Baptist tenets, having access to King Charles II, in 17th century England.

== Life ==
=== Early life ===
Thomas Grantham was born in January 1634 at Halton Holegate, near Spilsby, Lincolnshire, to William Grantham, being part of the ancient Grantham family in the region. Grantham was a husbandman and tailor by trade, owning three plots of land at Halton, Hundleby, and Ashby by Partney. He was initially an Anglican layman, and probably used to attend the parish church of St. Andrew's in his hometown. Travelling in South Marsh district, Grantham encountered a group of Puritans who seceded from a Nonconformist church between Spilsby and Boston in 1651, having adopted Baptist views. Grantham became convinced of the baptism of believers only, in contrast with the baptism of infants, and went to Boston Baptist Church. There, Grantham was baptised and received into the church in 1653.

=== Ministry ===
Shortly, Grantham was ordained minister in 1656 and brought the Baptist views to Halton Holegate. He organized the South Marsh church in Halton which initially had services held in private residence, but after considerable opposition, the church obtained a grant of the medieval Northolme Chapel, at Thorpe Northolme, near Wainfleet.

Grantham's key convert was John Watts, a wealthy man of some property who had received proper university education. Watts was ordained minister of a Baptist church with services conducted in his residence. By the efforts of Grantham and his evangelists, a number of Nonconformist Puritan Baptist churches were established in the south of Lincolnshire holding a full Arminian soteriology, differently from the Particular Baptists and other General Baptists.

=== Under Charles II ===
Grantham's name is not appended to the original 1660 edition of the Standard Confession of Faith, but he seems to have drawn up shortly after the Narrative and Complaint, which was signed by 35 General Baptists in Lincolnshire. Grantham and Joseph Wright were admitted on 26 July 1660 to present the Standard Confession and the Narrative to King Charles II, with a petition for toleration. Thomas Venner's insurrection of Fifth Monarchy Men in January 1661 raised fears of Anabaptist outbreaks. Two addresses to the throne were then drawn up by Baptists from Lincolnshire. The second of these was presented (23 February) by Grantham to Charles, who expressed himself as well disposed.

Grantham soon came into conflict with the authorities. Twice in 1662 he was arrested. The first time he was bound over to appear at the next assize at Lincoln; he was again arrested at Boston. His Arminian preaching having led to the rumour of his being a Jesuit. He was thrown into Lincoln gaol, and kept there some fifteen months, till at the spring assize of 1663 he and others were released, pursuant to a petition drawn up by him and presented to the king on 26 December.

In 1666 Grantham became a messenger, a position originally created by the English Baptists for the supervision of churches in a county (cf. Robert Everard, Faith and Order, 1649). Grantham developed this position into an itinerant ministry-at-large to "plant" churches. On 7 March 1670, he issued proposals for a public disputation with Robert Wright, formerly a Baptist pastor who had conformed at Lincoln; but neither Wright nor William Silverton, chaplain to Bishop William Fuller, would respond. Under the Conventicle Act 1670 Grantham was imprisoned again for six months at Louth. Soon after his release, he baptised a married woman. The husband threatened him with an action for damages, libeling him of having assaulted her. The indulgence of 15 March 1672 did not meet the case of the Baptists in Lincolnshire; accordingly, Grantham had another interview with the king on their behalf and obtained an ineffectual promise of redress. He suffered several imprisonments during the remaining years of Charles's reign. In 1678, Grantham published Christianismus Primitivus, opus magnum, a compilation of his treatises previously published during his ministry, considered the first Baptist work of systematics, that greatly shaped Baptist theology in the 17th and 18th century – mainly the General Baptist strand.

=== Later life ===
In 1685 or 1686, Grantham moved to Norwich, where he established a church in White Friars Yard. In 1686, he founded a similar church in King Street, Great Yarmouth; in 1688, he baptised persons at Warboys in Huntingdonshire; in 1689, he was allowed to preach in the town hall of King's Lynn, and established a church there.

Grantham's closing years were full of controversies with other Nonconformists in Norwich, especially John Collinges and Martin Fynch. With the established clergy of the city he was on better terms; John Connould, vicar of St. Stephen's, was a good friend, from a theological correspondence. On 6 October 1691, John Willet, rector of Tattershall, Lincolnshire, was brought up before the mayor of Norwich, Thomas Blofield, for slandering Grantham at Yarmouth and Norwich. Willet admitted that there was no foundation for his statement that Grantham had been pilloried at Louth for sheep-stealing. Grantham paid Willet's costs, and kept him out of gaol.

Grantham died on Sunday, 17 January 1692, aged 58 years, and was buried just within the west door of St. Stephen's Church. A crowd attended the funeral; the service was read by his friend Connould. Connould was buried in the same grave in May 1703. A long memorial inscription was later placed in Grantham's meeting house, probably by his grandson Grantham Killingworth.

== Views ==
Thomas Grantham, being the leading divine of the General Baptists in the 17th century, was Arminian. Yet, he differed from the Arminian Anglicans of his day. He advocated strong Calvinist doctrines of human depravity (the absolute inability in spiritual matters apart from the convicting and prevenient grace of the Holy Spirit), penal substitutionary atonement, and justification by the imputed passive obedience and active obedience of Christ, as well as a Calvinist sanctification. He believed in conditional preservation of the saints, which is that salvation could be forfeited only by apostasy from Christ through unbelief, happening only to the non-elect, a condition from which one could never recover. Grantham, as any other English Puritan, also advocated the Reformed view of Real Presence in the Eucharist (the view where the believer receives the real Body and Blood of Christ in a spiritual manner through faith), emphasizing spiritual nourishment.

Like other 17th century Baptists, Grantham advocated interdependence of local churches, in a "Via Media" between congregational and presbyteral approaches to church polity through the existence of associations, which was a distinct church polity held by Baptists. These associations had more power than any later Baptist organizations, though the local church was still ultimately autonomous and could disagree with the findings of associations and messengers. The stronger view of interconnection between local churches melded with Grantham's development of the position of messenger, to which he was chosen. Messengers were seen as having duties like the apostles, yet without their authority and extraordinary gifts. Thus messengers engaged in evangelism, apologetic activities, advising churches, mentoring and ordaining local ministers (when necessary), and helping to resolve congregational conflicts. He also believed in the imposition of hands on the newly baptized, anointing with oil for healing (but not the extraordinary gift of healing), and, like many Baptists of his day, believed in the singing of psalmody only by soloists as a part of public worship. He also strongly believed in the doctrine of religious liberty and liberty of conscience, being one of the most prolific authors on the concept in the 17th century.

Grantham's views on the Holy Scriptures and Church Tradition were similar to those of the Magisterial Reformers, as John Calvin, and Balthasar Hubmaier, in that he had a high esteem for the Church Fathers and widely quoted them, considering as authorities for the Church today, while holding to a standard Reformed Sola scriptura.

His debates with Anglicans, Presbyterians, Quakers, and Roman Catholics were widely read and quoted in the seventeenth century and evinced his unique Arminian soteriology which shaped the General Baptist strand.

== Works ==
Grantham published:

- The Prisoner against the Prelate, or a Dialogue between the Common Gaol at Lincoln and the Baptist, n.d. (1662, in verse).
- The Baptist against the Papist, 1663, (dated Lincoln Castle, 10 January 1662, i.e. 1663 (N.S.).
- The Seventh Day Sabbath Ceased, 1667.
- A Sigh for Peace: or the Cause of Division Discovered, 1671 (in answer to A Search for Schism).
- The Baptist against the Quaker, (1673? against Robert Ruckhill and John Whitehead)
- A Religious Contention … a Dispute at Blyton, 1674.
- The Loyal Baptist; or an Apology for the Baptised Believers, 1674; 2nd part, 1684, (answer to Nathaniel Taylor).
- The Fourth Principle of Christ's Doctrine Vindicated, 1674.
- The Successors of the Apostles, or a Discourse of the Messengers, 1674.
- The Paedobaptists Apology for the Baptised Churches, (1674?).
- Mr. Horne Answered, or paedo-rantism not from Zion, 1675. Against John Horne.
- The Quæries Examined, or, Fifty anti-queries seriously propounded to the people called Presbyterians, 1676. Against John Barret.
- Christianismus Primitivus, 1678, (four books, each book and each part of bk. ii. separately paged; bk. iv. has separate title-page); it is a collection of treatises, and reprinted a number of the works above.
- An Epistle for Plain Truth and Peace, 1680.
- A Friendly Epistle to the Bishops and Ministers of the Church of England, 1680.
- Presumption, No Proof, 1687?. in reply to Samuel Petto.
- St. Paul's Catechism, 1687; 2nd ed. 1693.
- Hear the Church, an Appeal to the Mother of us all, 1688.
- The Infants' Advocate, 1688; 2nd part, 1689 (against Giles Firmin and Joseph Whiston).
- Truth and Peace: a Friendly Debate concerning Infant Baptism, 1689.
- A Dialogue between the Baptist and the Presbyterian, 1691, against John Collinges; answered by Martin Fynch. It contains lines of verse on Michael Servetus. Grantham apparently had access to the manuscript copy of the Christianismi Restitutio of Servetus, in the library (now at Cambridge) of John Moore. These verses (1691) are an early favourable notice of Servetus in English.
- The Forerunner to a Further Answer to Two Books, (1691?).
- The Grand Imposter caught in his own Snare, 1691.
- The Dying Words of [Thomas] Grantham, 1692.

Among his unpublished manuscripts were The Baptist's Complaints against the Persecuting Priests, 1685, and Christianitas Restaurata, of which the title seems borrowed from Servetus; both are quoted by Thomas Crosby for their biographical matter. William Richard in 1805 could not gain access to Grantham's manuscripts.

== Notes and references ==
This article incorporates text from a publication now in the public domain: Stephen, Leslie; Lee, Sidney, eds. (1890). "Grantham, Thomas (1634-1692)". Dictionary of National Biography. Vol. 22. London: Smith, Elder & Co.
