= Sir John Hobart, 2nd Baronet =

English politician (1593–1647)

Sir John Hobart

Baronet of Intwood
- Reign: 1625–1647
- Predecessor: Sir Henry Hobart, 1st Baronet
- Successor: Sir John Hobart, 3rd Baronet
- Born: 19 April 1593; Norwich
- Died: 20 April 1647 (aged 54); Norwich
- Buried: 29 April 1647; Blickling, Norfolk
- Noble family: Hobart
- Spouses: Lady Philippa Sidney; Lady Frances Egerton
- Issue: Philippa; Phillipa
- Father: Sir Henry Hobart, 1st Baronet
- Mother: Dorothy Bell

Sir John Hobart, 2nd Baronet (19 April 1593 – 20 April 1647) was an English politician and baronet.

== Background ==
Born in Norwich, he was the eldest son of Sir Henry Hobart, 1st Baronet, and his wife Dorothy Bell, daughter of Sir Robert Bell. Hobart was knighted at Whitehall on 10 November 1611, and succeeded his father as baronet in 1625.

== Career ==
Hobart was Member of Parliament for Cambridge in 1621, Lostwithiel from 1624 to 1625 and Brackley in 1626. He then returned to the Long Parliament for Norfolk in 1645, a seat he held until his death in 1647.

He was Justice of the Peace for Middlesex from 1624 to 1629 and for Norfolk from 1625 to his death, and was appointed High Sheriff of Norfolk for 1632–33. Both he and his wife experienced evangelical conversions at the hands of John Carter the younger of Norwich. John Collinges became chaplain to the family.

His second wife, Frances Hobart, managed his large debts as he completed the building of Blickling Hall, a major Jacobean country house.

== Family ==
He married firstly in July 1614 Lady Philippa Sidney, a daughter of Robert Sidney, 1st Earl of Leicester. They had a daughter. Philippa died in 1620. and Hobart married secondly Lady Frances Egerton, eldest daughter of John Egerton, 1st Earl of Bridgwater and Frances Egerton, Countess of Bridgewater in February 1621, and they had by nine children but only one child, Phillipa, survived. He died, aged 54, in Norwich after a long illness and was buried in Blickling in Norfolk nine days later. Hobart was succeeded in the baronetcy by his nephew John.

Parliament of England
Preceded by Sir Edmund Moundeford; Sir John Potts, 1st Bt	Member of Parliament for Norfolk; 1645–1647; With: Sir John Potts, 1st Bt	Succeeded by Sir John Palgrave, 1st Bt; Sir John Potts, 1st Bt
Baronetage of England
Preceded by Henry Hobart	Baronet (of Intwood); 1625–1647	Succeeded by John Hobart
