= John Collinges =

English Presbyterian theologian and prolific writer

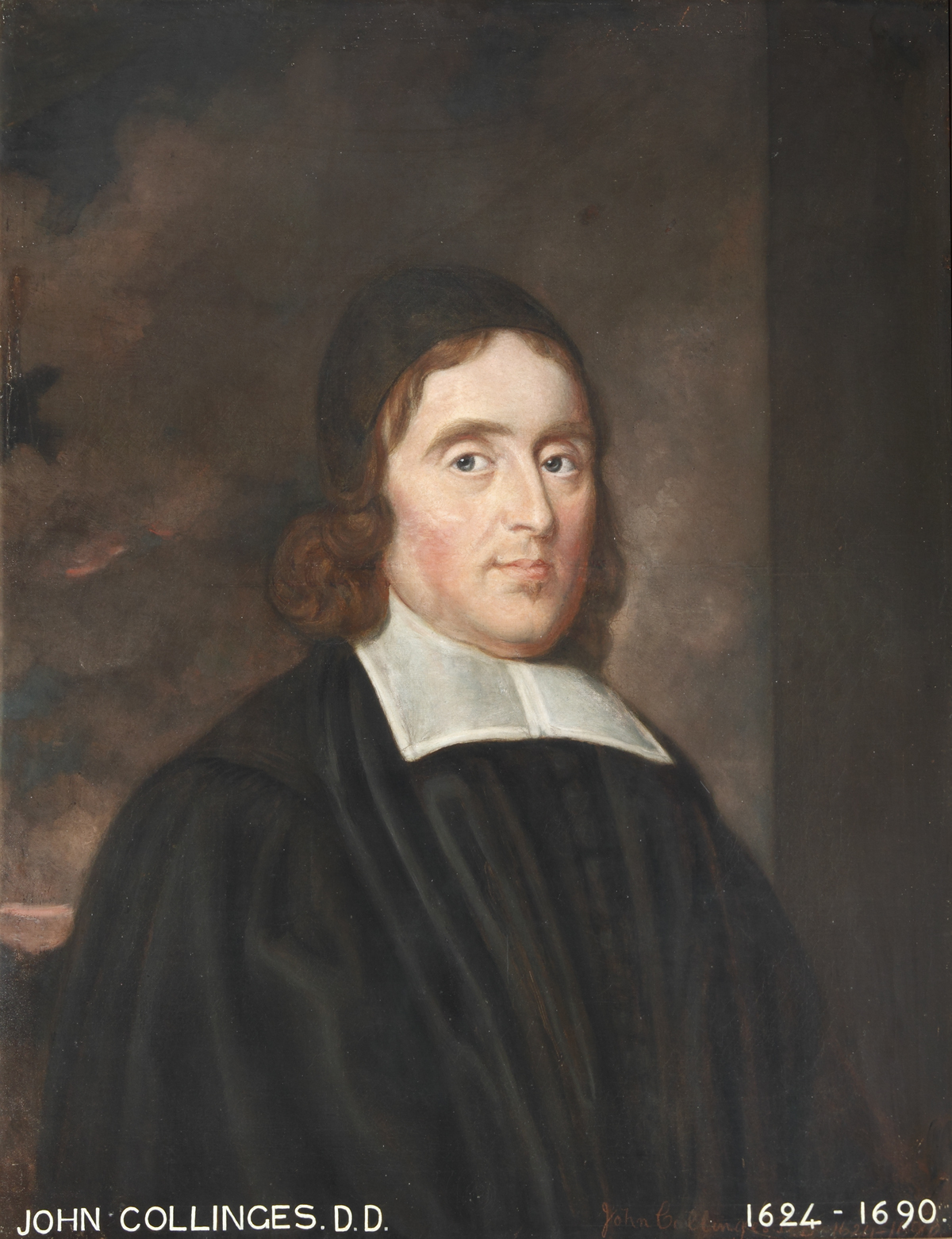
John Collinges

John Collinges (1624–1691) was an English Presbyterian theologian, and prolific writer. He lived and worked in Norwich for more than forty years where he played a major role in reviving and administering the City Library. He was one of the representatives of the Presbyterians in the Savoy Conference, but was later forced to resign his livings. Frances Hobart became his patron and he became her personal chaplain. He delivered services in a chapel she created in her Norwich home.

== Life ==
He was the son of Edward Collinges, M. A., born at Boxted, Essex, and educated to 16 at the grammar school of Dedham, where he came under the influence of Matthew Newcomen. His father died when he was fifteen, but he was sent as a sizar to Emmanuel College, Cambridge. He matriculated in 1639; graduated B.A. 1643, M.A. 1646, B.D. 1653 and D.D. 1658.

By age about 22 he had become a preacher, living in the family of Isaac Wyncoll of Bures, Essex, whose eldest daughter he married. A letter dated 24 October 1683 to Sir Henry Hobart, refers to him having an adult son, but his name and dates are not known.

In September 1646 he met the religious Lady Frances Hobart and Sir John Hobart and he became their chaplain. He created a schedule for them that included studying scripture twice a day and prayers three times a day. In addition there was study of the catechism and sermons. Sir John was an MP but ill health obliged him to return home to Norwich and Collinges accepted their invitation to join them.

After Sir John Hobart's death in 1647, part of her house in Norwich was converted into a chapel by his widow, and here for sixteen years, till the passing of the act restraining religious meetings, Collinges lectured on weekdays, and repeated his public discourses on Sunday nights. In 1653 he took the place of Harding, the ejected vicar of St. Stephen's parish, which he held without institution till the Restoration compelled him to resign it.

Collinges was appointed one of the commissioners at the Savoy Conference, and was anxious for an accommodation. After his ejection, he continued to live in St Peter’s parish and minister to the Presbyterians, funded by members of his church. In 1690 he was receiving £56 per year. On 30 April 1672 he received a licence to be a Presbyterian teacher in Norwich

During the early 1680s, suspicion fell on the nonconformist sects in Norwich, and a report on the city in the State Papers refers to him as one of two leaders of the disaffected element in the city: "a D.D. and a man of some learning, which he employs in promoting Presbytery and, were he removed, 'tis probable many of that sect would fall off. They, the Anabaptists and the Quakers not only unite against the government, but are such good friends as to hold their meetings under one roof."

In the aftermath of the Rye House Plot of 1683 Collinges was arrested on two occasions in 1685 as a nonjuring suspect, but no action was eventually taken. He died at Walcott, Norfolk in January 1690/1. His funeral sermon was preached by Martin Fynch, and published in Norwich in 1695. A memorial to him in Latin is given in the Old Meeting House, Norwich.

== Works ==
Throughout his adult life John Collinges was a voluminous and at times verbose writer of theological works of different types, published in London and Norwich. Many of these were published under his own name, some under his initials and some anonymously.

=== Lectures and Sermons ===
His earliest published works were extended versions of his lectures and sermons, such as The spouses hidden glory, and faithfull leaning upon her welbeloved, (1646 and 1647) and A memorial for posteritie, preached at the funeral of these patron Sir John Hobart.(1647). During his career he would publish approaching one hundred of his sermons and lectures both as individual works and also in collections such as A cordiall for a fainting soule, (published in three parts 1649 - 1652) consisting of ‘sermons delivered in so many lectures in a private chappell belonging to Chappell-Field-House in Norwich’, or Thirteen sermons upon several useful subjects (1684).

=== Religious controversy ===
Throughout the 1650s Collinges was a keen controversialist. In 1651 he published 'Vindiciae Ministerii Evangelici,' which is a vindication of a Gospel ministry against the claim of 'intercommonage' on the part of 'gifted men' not regularly set apart to preach. This was attacked by William Sheppard in The People's Privileges and Duty guarded against the Pulpit and Preachers, to which Collinges at once replied in Responsoria ad Erratica Pastoris or The Shepherds wandrings discovered. 'Vindiciae Ministerii Evangelici,' was again attacked in 1658 by John Martin, in "The preacher sent: or, A vindication of the liberty of publick preaching". Collinges published Vindiciae Ministerii Evangelici revindicatae: or The preacher (pretendedly) sent, sent back again, to bring a better account who sent him, and learn his errand . In time this resulted in the publication of "A vindication of the Preacher Sent, or a warrant for publick preaching without ordination", by Francis Petto and John Woodall.

In 1653 Collinges attacked two pamphlets, one by Edward Fisher, and the other published anonymously by Alan Blane with the title Festorum Metropolis, in which the Puritan observance of the Sabbath was criticised, and the better observance of Christmas Day insisted upon. Collinges names his reply Responsoria ad Erratica Piscatoris, and has a dedication in heroic verse "to my dear Saviour". He denies that the date of Christ's birth can be fixed. The dispute continued in to 1655 with the publication of Collinges’ Responsoria Bipartita, again discussing church government, and considering the right of the church to suspend the ignorant and the scandalous from the Lord's Supper.

During 1654 Collinges became involved with a heated pamphlet war with Theophilus Brabourne in St Peter Mancroft parish, Norwich. He attacked the latter’s Change of Church Discipline in a tract entitled Indoctus Doctor Edoctus. Brabourne replied with "A reply to Indoctus Doctor Edoctus" to which Collinges rejoined with A New Lesson for the Indoctus Doctor. Brabourne responded with "The second vindication of my first book of the change of discipline; being a reply to Mr Collings his second answer to it". In December 1654, Collinges published "Provocator provocatus, or, An answer made to an open challenge made by one M. Boatman in Peters parish in Norwich". To which Brabourne chose to reply with, "A reply to Mr Collings Provocator provocatus: or, To his answer made to Mr Boatman, touching suspension from the Sacrament". After 1659 Collinges dropped the controversy.

=== Devotional and exegetical writings ===
In 1650 appeared Five Lessons for a Christian to learn. In 1675 he produced The Weaver's Pocket Book, or Weaving spiritualised, a work intended specially for the weavers of Norwich, in imitation of John Flavel's Navigation and Husbandry spiritualised. This work was reprinted many times, particularly in Scotland, and the last known edition was dated Edinburgh: 1780. In 1676 he published The Intercourses of Divine Love between Christ and His Church, an exposition of chapter ii. of the Song of Solomon, which in 1683 was incorporated with a similar exposition of chapter i., and a metrical paraphrase. In 1678 there appeared Several Discourses concerning the actual Providence of God, containing ninety-eight sermons. In 1680 appeared the Defensative Armour against four of Satan's most fiery Darts, and in 1681 a tract on the Improveableness of Water Baptism.

=== Biographical works ===
Two biographical works were: Faith and Experience, published in 1647, containing an account of Mary Simpson of St. Gregory's parish, Norwich, and Par Nobile, begun in 1665 on the death of his patron, Lady Frances Hobart, but hindered from publication by the Great Plague and destroyed in 1666 by the Great Fire of London. It was rewritten and published in 1675, because of certain slanders, and contains accounts of the lives of Lady Frances Hobart, and Lady Katharine Courten who married William Courten, daughters of John Egerton, 1st Earl of Bridgewater.

Collinges also wrote the annotations in Matthew Poole's Bible on the last six chapters of Isaiah, Jeremiah, Lamentation, the four Evangelists, 1 and 2 Corinthians, Galatians, 1 and 2 Timothy, Philemon, and Revelation.
