= Thomas Allen (nonconformist) =

East Anglian minister (1608–1673)

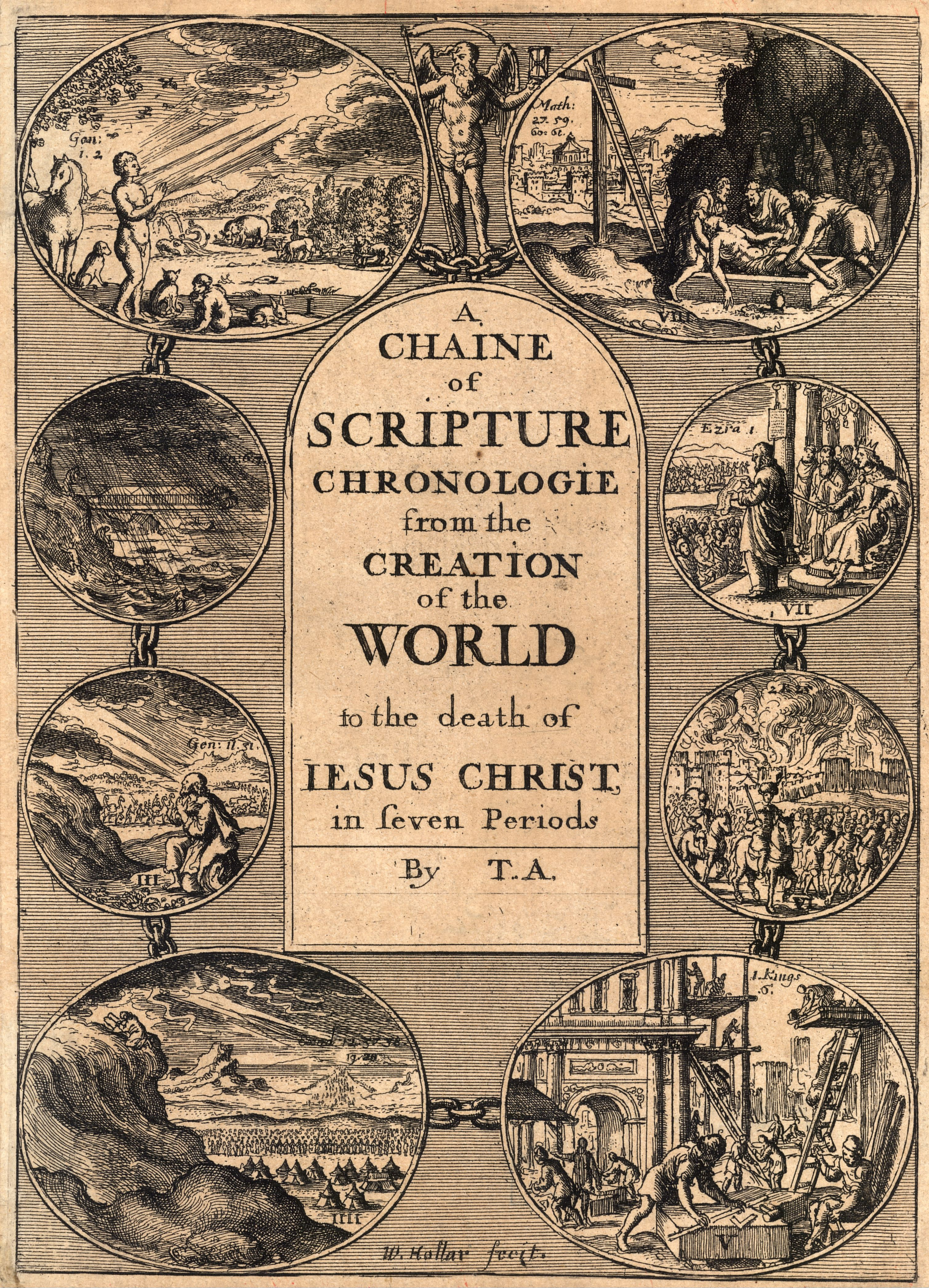
Hollar's title-page for Allen's Chain of Scripture Chronology (1659)

Thomas Allen or Allyn (1608 in Norwich – 21 September 1673) was an East Anglian nonconformist minister and divine who preached during the 1640s in Charlestown, Massachusetts, but returned to England during the Commonwealth and was ejected after the Stuart Restoration. He was the author of various published works.

== Life ==
Allen was the son of John Allen, a Norwich dyer. He was educated in Norwich and at Caius College, Cambridge, where he matriculated in 1625 and was scholar 1625-29, taking B.A. in 1627/28 and M.A. in 1631. Having received licence and holy orders at Norwich in March 1633/34, he became minister of St Edmund's Church, Norwich, 1633-38. But he was too pronouncedly evangelical and outspoken. Bishop Matthew Wren silenced him in 1636, together with William Bridge and others, for refusing to read the Declaration of Sports.

=== To New England ===
In 1638 Allen passed over as a fugitive to New England. Admitted to the church of Boston on 11 January 1638/39, on 9 June following, at his own request and that of the church of Charlestown, he was dismissed from Boston, and was admitted to Charlestown on 22 December 1639 (O.S.). Then, or soon afterwards, he became Teacher, as the fellow-worker of Zechariah Symmes, pastor of Charlestown. In this capacity he succeeded John Harvard, who had died in September 1638 little more than a year after arriving in Charlestown. He is supposed to have married Harvard's widow, Anne, for he acted as administrator in the execution of Harvard's estate and paid his bequests. His recorded children were Mary (1639/40), Sarah (1641), Elizabeth (1643) and Mercy (1646), of whom only Mary survived infancy, and a son, Thomas. On 3 May 1639 Allen received the large grant of 500 acres of land from the General Court, "in regard to Mr. Harvard's gift".

Cotton Mather observed that he "approved himself a pious and painful minister of the Gospel at Charlestown", where he remained Teacher until 1651. In his first years in New England he witnessed the foundation of the town of Woburn. The texts of his sermons, not least his series upon the words of St John the Baptist in the closing verses of St John's Gospel, chapter 3, concern the doctrine of Justification by Faith. During this time also he conceived and developed his best-known work, A Chaine of Scripture Chronologie, which constructed a chronology of the history of the world, in seven periods down to the crucifixion of Jesus Christ in 3968 Anno Mundi. Although not published until 1659 in London, the Epistle to Allen's book by William Greenhill (as quoted by Cotton Mather) states: "This work having had its conception in a remote corner of the world, it was latent in his closet, the greatest part of seven years... and it had still been suppressed, had not the author been pressed, and charged with hiding of a talent in a napkin, by... [Mr. John Cotton]." (John Cotton died in 1652). Greenhill remarks that its author, wearied with controversy, was glad to leave others to "dispute" while he should "compute": like Abraham Buchholzer (he says with a flourish), malle se computare quam disputare. By his own introduction Allen acknowledged that he owed much to other scholars, but declined to share their names with his readers. However, a copy preserved in the New England Library (Thomas Prince Collection, Boston Public Library) has the names of the authorities from whom he quoted written in his own hand.

=== Return to England ===
Allen's wife Anne died in or soon after 1651. In that year he returned to Norwich where he found a ministry as "preacher of the city" in St George's parish. (He was not the rector of St George's, Norwich.) On his return he wrote a letter (dated 8 November 1651 from Norwich) affirming the missionary work of John Eliot and Thomas Mayhew, jnr., as they had themselves told him of it, in preaching the gospel among the Native Americans. Allen had not had the strength to follow that calling himself.

In England Allen remarried, to the widow of Robert Sedgwick. He was pastor of the congregational church in Norwich from 1657, but was ejected following the Act of Uniformity 1662. After this he preached there whenever opportunity arose. John Cromwell succeeded him as pastor, and Cromwell's successor, Martin Fynch, who knew Allen, gave a character of him in his preface dated 1674 to a volume of Allen's sermons. He calls him a "burning and shining light":

"he was an excellent preacher, plain and powerful in his doctrine, and though he was a learned man, yet he preached without all ostentation, he did not confound his hearers with obscure terms and fantastical expressions, but endeavoured to set forth the Truths of God in the most plain and convincing way to the consciences of men... Another thing that I would mention of this worthy man was his marvellous condescension in private discourses to his brethren in the ministry, who were much inferiour to him in age and gifts, not standing on his own great worth, never exalting himself, but preferring them above himself, hearing their judgements in any matter with as great reverence and respect as if they had been his superiors. Surely his humility was extraordinary, and a notable example to all that knew him."

Fynch added:

"As he was a Scribe instructed to the Kingdom of God in all points of the doctrine of religion, so he was expert in all questions about Church-discipline above many; for which he had been much advantaged by living so long in New-England, and having there such intimate acquaintance with those famous men Mr Bulkly, Mr Hooker, Mr Cotton, Mr Shephard, and others there, who lived in his heart when they were dead, and he delighted to speak, and to relate some remarkable passages of them."

Thomas Allen died on 21 September 1673. Fynch published a volume of his sermons in 1676, and a further collection in 1683.

== Writings ==
As editor:

- A Treatise of the Covenant of Grace, as it is dispensed to the elect seed, effectually unto salvation. Being the substance of divers sermons preached upon Act. 7. 8. by that eminently holy and judicious man of God, Mr. John Cotton, teacher of the church at Boston in N.E., prepared for the press with an Epistle to the Reader by Thomas Allen (London 1659).

As author:

- A Chain of Scripture Chronology from the Creation of the World to the Death of Jesus Christ (London, 1659), with title piece by Wenceslaus Hollar.
- The Way of the Spirit in bringing Souls to Christ. Set forth in X. sermons on John XVI. 7, 8, 9, 10 and chap VII. 37, by Thomas Allen, Minister of St. Edmond's Norwich (London, 1676). Editor's address by Martin Fynch.
- The Call of Christ unto Thirsty Sinners, to come to Him and drink of the waters of life (Three Sermons on John VII vs 37). This was first published in 1676 in The Way of the Spirit (above, Sermons VIII-X). Soon afterwards it was published separately in Boston, Massachusetts, with a foreword dated 1678 by John Higginson. This was retained in the Boston reprints of 1705 and 1709.
- The Glory of Christ Set Forth in several sermons from John III. 34, 35, 36 and V.25: with, The Necessity of Faith (London, 1683). Editor's address by Martin Fynch.
- Three sermons on John III vs 33, "He that hath received his Testimony, hath set to his seal that God is true", are in a small manuscript volume in the American Antiquarian Society, Mather family papers.
