= Sir Henry Hobart, 1st Baronet =

English politician (1560–1625)

Sir Henry Hobart Bt SL
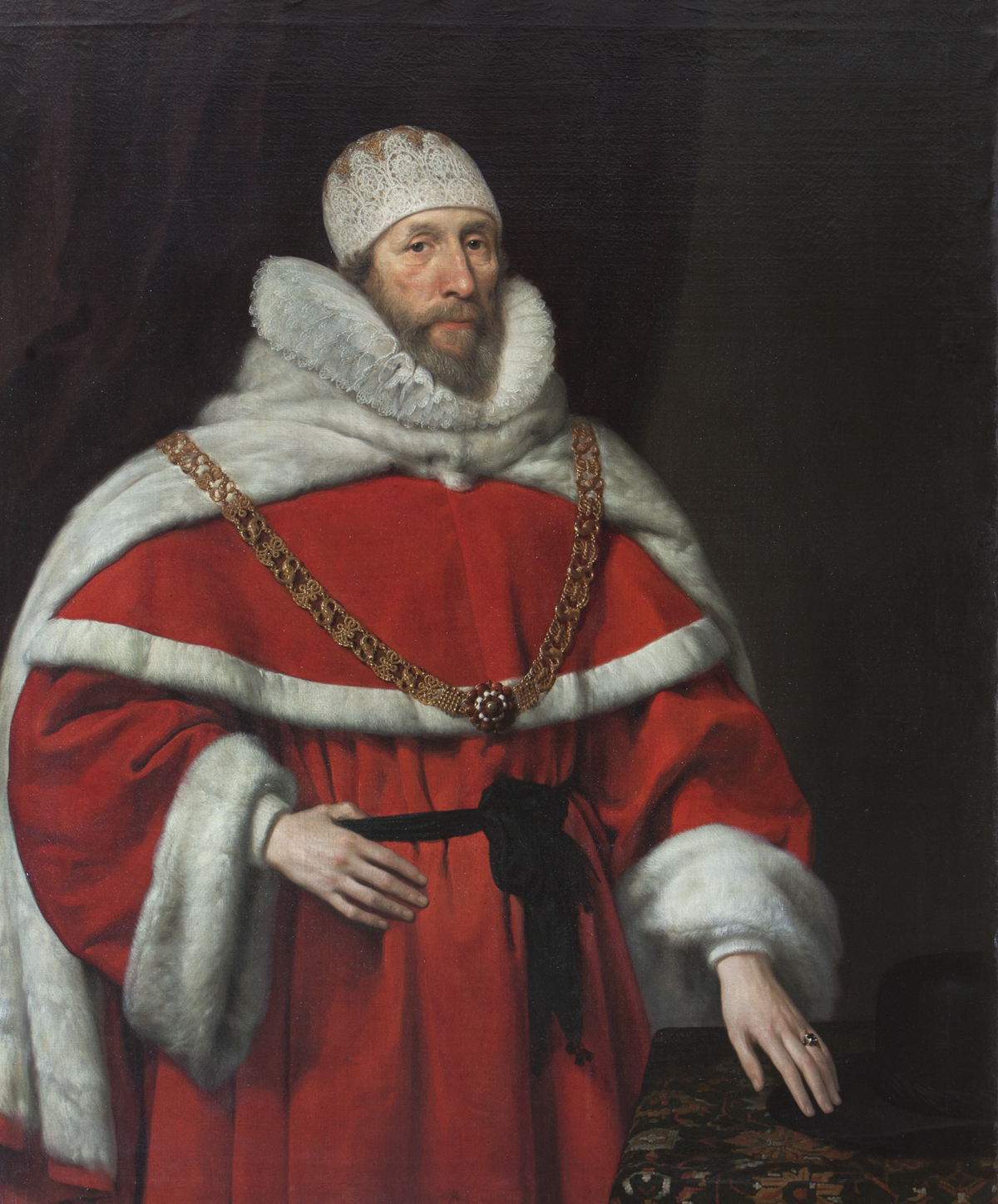
- Portrait by Daniël Mijtens

Chief Justice of the Common Pleas
- In office 1613–1625
- Monarchs: James I, Charles I
- Preceded by: Sir Edward Coke
- Succeeded by: Sir Thomas Richardson

Attorney General for England and Wales
- In office 1606–1613
- Monarch: James I
- Preceded by: Sir Edward Coke
- Succeeded by: Sir Francis Bacon

Personal details
- Born: 1 January 1560
- Died: 29 December 1625 (aged 64–65)
- Spouse: Dorothy Bell
- Children: 16

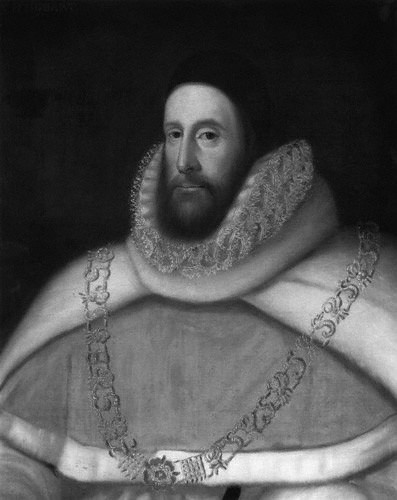
Sir Henry Hobart, Bt.

Sir Henry Hobart, 1st Baronet (1 January 1560 – 29 December 1625), of Blickling Hall, was an English politician who succeeded Sir Edward Coke to become Chief Justice of the Court of Common Pleas.

== Background and education ==
Henry Hobart was the son of Thomas Hobart and Audrey Hare, and great-grandson of Sir James Hobart of Monks Eleigh, Suffolk, who served as Attorney General during the reign of King Henry VII. He was admitted to Lincoln's Inn on 10 August 1575, and was later called to the Bar in 1584, and subsequently became governor of Lincoln's Inn in 1591.

== Legal and political career ==
Between 1588 and 1589, Hobart was Member of Parliament (MP) for St Ives, for Great Yarmouth in 1597 and 1601, and for Norwich from 1604 to 1611. He was Steward of Norwich in 1595, made Serjeant from 1603 to 1606, and later served as Attorney for the Court of Wards in 1605 and Attorney General for England and Wales between 1606 and 1613 while Bacon was Solicitor-General. While in that post, they argued Calvin's Case, by which the Rights of Englishmen were bestowed on the postnati Scots. (Note: State trials at the time, before the Law Lords en banc, had two rounds of arguments, one apiece by Solicitor- then Attorney-General.)

From 1613 to 1625, Hobart was elevated to Chief Justice of the Court of Common Pleas. Hobart was knighted in 1603 and made a Baronet on 11 May 1611 Baronet, of Intwood in the County of Norfolk.

Hobart successfully acquired a fair amount of Norfolk property, including the estates of Intwood in 1596 and Blickling in 1616, where he was buried on 4 January 1626 (new calendar).

== Family ==
In April 1590, Hobart married Dorothy Bell, the daughter of Robert Bell. A letter sent to Dorothy Hobart in 1626 was discovered at Lauderdale House in 1800.

They had twelve sons, including John Hobart and four daughters.

== See also ==
- Earl of Buckinghamshire

== Notes ==
Legal offices
Preceded by Sir Edward Coke	Attorney General for England and Wales; 1606–1613	Succeeded by Sir Francis Bacon
Preceded by Sir Edward Coke	Chief Justice of the Common Pleas; 1613–1625	Succeeded by Sir Thomas Richardson
Baronetage of England
New creation	Baronet (of Intwood); 1611–1625	Succeeded by John Hobart
