= Frances Hobart =

English religious benefactor (1603–1664)

- Born: 1603; London
- Died: 27 November 1664 (aged 60–61); Norwich
- Noble family: Egerton
- Spouse: Sir John Hobart, 2nd Baronet
- Issue: Phillipa
- Father: John Egerton, 1st Earl of Bridgewater
- Mother: Frances Egerton, Countess of Bridgewater

Frances, Lady Hobart, born Frances Egerton (1603 – 1664), was an English religious benefactor. She managed the finances during the completion of Blickling Hall. She undertook an arduous religious regime arranged by her chaplain John Collinges.

== Life ==
Hobart was born Frances Egerton in 1603. She was one of the eight children born to John Egerton, 1st Earl of Bridgewater and Frances Egerton, Countess of Bridgewater. She was fluent in French as her parents gave her a Huguenot governess at a very young age.

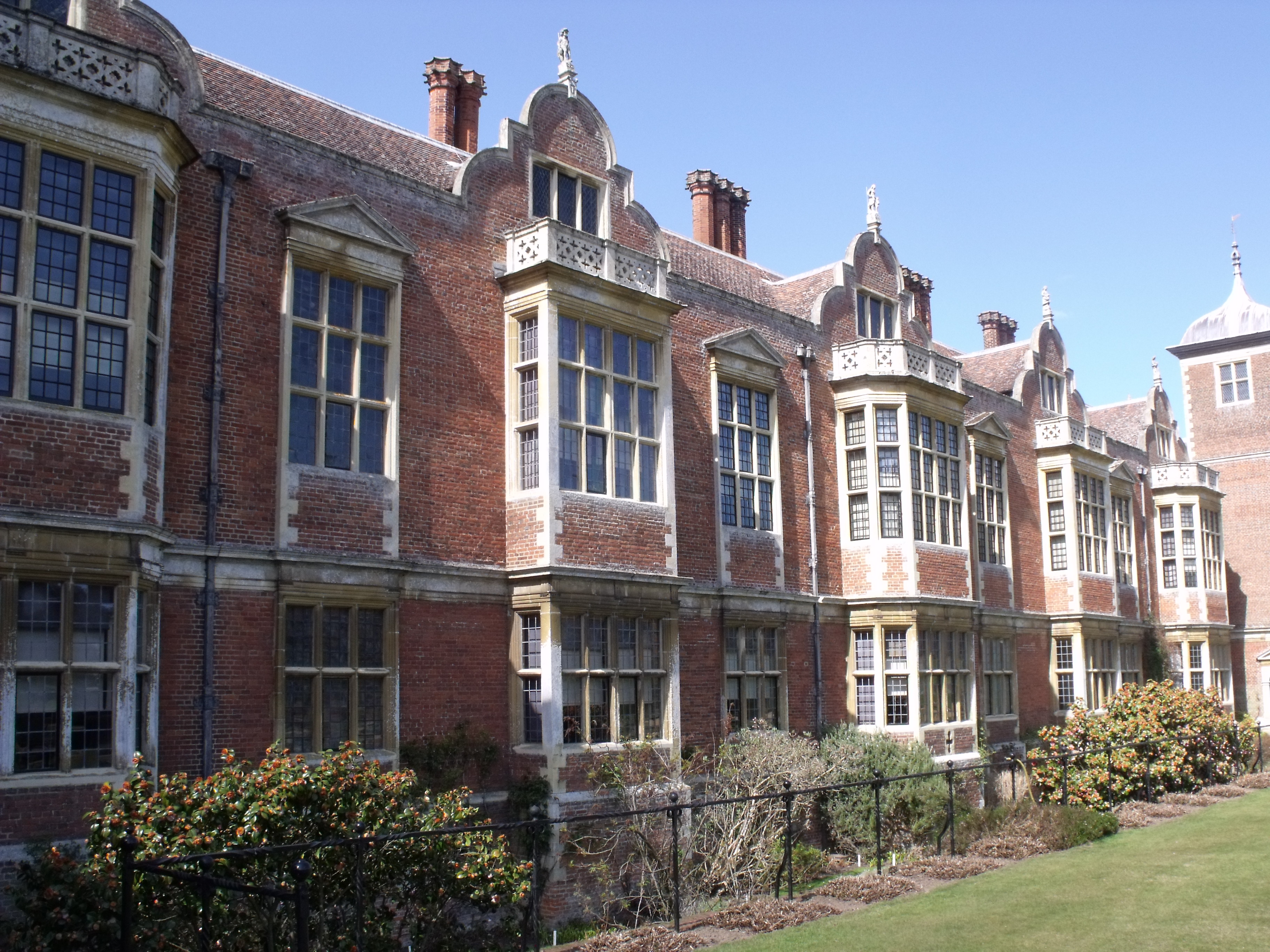
She managed the finances as Blickling Hall was completed

She married in February 1621 Sir John Hobart, 2nd Baronet and became his second wife. No children survived from his previous marriage. She and Sir John, had nine children but only one child, Phillipa, survived. During their marriage her husband completed the building of Blickling Hall which his father had started. The debts incurred were under her management and she reduced the huge debts by £6,000.

She became enthusiastically religious and committed under the guidance of John Carter of St Peter Mancroft in Norwich and her husband soon followed her lead.

In September 1646 she and her husband met John Collinges in London where her husband was a member of parliament. Collinges became their chaplain and he created a schedule for them that included studying scripture twice a day and prayers three times a day. In addition there was study of the catechism and sermons. Collinges published "The spouses hidden glory, and faithfull leaning upon her wellbeloved...".

Sir John's health obliged them to return home and Collinges accepted their invitation to join them.

In 1647 her husband died and she decided never to remarry. Her only daughter, Phillipa, married her husband's nephew and his heir, Sir John Hobart, 3rd Baronet. She moved to a house in Norwich called Chapelfield where her chaplain, John Collinges, followed. While she was still agile she would start her prayers at four in the morning. She read the old testament every year and the new testament three times a year. She would hear about three sermons each day and she also bought a hundred pounds worth of books on religious matters for reference.

She converted several lower rooms of her house to create a chapel so that services could be held there. The services were popular and they continued in her house for sixteen years. Collinges would lecture there each week and conduct evening services. Her chaplain was ejected from St Stephen's Church in Norwich in 1662.

In 1664 Sir Joseph Paine, sometime mayor of Norwich, led a group who tried to disrupt services in her house and she successfully protested. In that year she died from dropsy and she was buried beside her husband in Blickling church. Her will was long and generous. She left her home to Lady Katherine Courten and this is presumed so that services could continue after her death.
