= Martin Fynch =

English ejected minister (c.1628–1698)

Martin Fynch or Finch (c. 1628—1698) was an English ejected minister.

== Life ==
Martin Fynch of Norfolk was born about 1628. He was admitted pensioner at Trinity College, Cambridge in January 1645/46, where he took B.A. in 1646/47, and was Scholar in 1647. He entered the ministry about 1648. He ministered at Tetney, Lincolnshire from at least 1653, from which his Milk for Babes (1653), his Animadversions (1656) and his Manuall of Practicall Divinity (1658) were published. He was ejected from the vicarage of Tetney by the Act of Uniformity 1662.

In 1668 he was in Norwich, where he acted as one of three "heads and teachers" of a congregation of three hundred independents, who met for worship in the house of John Tofts, a grocer, in St. Clement's parish. On the issuing of the indulgence of 1672, Fynch took out a licence to preach in the house of Nicholas Withers, in St. Clement's. He became pastor of the independent congregation in succession to John Cromwell (d. April 1685). Their meeting-place was the west granary in St. Andrew's parish. Fynch removed his flock to a brewhouse in St. Edmund's parish, which he fitted up as a meeting-house; and after the passing of the Toleration Act (1689) he secured a site in St. Clement's parish, being "part of the Friars' great garden", on which a handsome building was erected (finished 1693), originally known as the "New Meeting", but since 1756 called the "Old Meeting". John Stackhouse was Fynch's colleague from about 1691.

With the presbyterian minister at Norwich, John Collinges, D.D., who died 18 January 1691, Fynch was in close relations, both personal and ecclesiastical. In accordance with the terms of the "happy union" (mooted in 1690), these divines agreed to discard the dividing names "presbyterian" and ‘independent’ and co-operate simply as dissenters. Fynch preached Collinges's funeral sermon, and defended his memory in reply to a pamphlet by Thomas Grantham (1634–1692).

Fynch suffered from failing eyesight, and was a victim to calculus. He died on 13 February 1697 (i.e. 1698), and was buried in the graveyard on the north side of his meeting-house, immediately behind the pulpit. The epitaph on his flat tombstone is the main authority for the dates of his biography. "He was a man of most remarkable seriousness, meekness, prudence, and patience under that most calamitous distemper, the stone [...], mingled with the greatest zeal to do good to the souls of men; which qualities commanded the veneration of that great assembly, and kept matters in peace there." After his death there was a rupture in his congregation, which lasted for twenty years.

== Works ==
- Milk for babes in Christ: or Meditations, observations, and experiences: Divers cases of conscience resolved. The glorious priviledges of them that are Christs, with the way to know whether we are of that blessed number. Also, election before the foundation of the world asserted, and the faith of Gods elect, what it is: together with Christs compassions to sinners. By Martin Fynch, a weak labourer in the Lords harvest, in Lincolnshire. (Printed for Tho. Brewster, and are to be sold at his shop, at the sign of the three Bibles, at the west-end of Pauls, London 1653).
- Animadversions upon Sir Henry Vanes book, entituled The Retired Mans Meditations. Examining his doctrine concerning Adam's fall, Christs person, and sufferings, justification, common and special grace; and many other things in his book. By Martin Finch, preacher of the Gospel (Printed for Joseph Barber, and are sold at the Lamb in Pauls Church-yard, London 1656).
- A Manuall of Practicall Divinity for the Benefit of Weak Christians, the informing their judgements, the quickning their affections, and directing their conversation. With several things that may be of use for the convincing and awakening those that are yet in their natural estate. By Martin Fynch, pastor of the Church of Christ at Tetney in Lincoln-shire (Printed by R.W. for Thomas Brewster at the three Bibles near the west end of Pauls, London 1658).
- Of the Conversion of Sinners to God in Christ: The 1. necessity, 2. nature, 3. means, 4. signs of it. With a concluding speech to the unconverted (Printed for Henry Mortlock, London 1680).
- An answer to Mr. Thomas Grantham's book, called, A dialogue between the Baptist and the Presbyterian (Printed by T.S. for Edward Giles and Tho. Parkhurst, London 1691).
- A sermon preach'd upon the death of that pious and learned divine, John Collinges, D.D.: the 25th day of January, 1690 : from Acts 13, 36 (Printed by Edward Giles, Norwich 1695).

He saw two volumes of the works of Thomas Allen through the press after the author's death (which occurred in 1673):

- The Way of the Spirit in bringing Souls to Christ. Set forth in X. sermons on John XVI. 7, 8, 9, 10 and chap VII. 37, by Thomas Allen, Minister of St. Edmond's Norwich (London, 1676). Editor's address by Martin Fynch.
- The Glory of Christ Set Forth in several sermons from John III. 34, 35, 36 and V. 25 : and The Necessity of Faith in order to pleasing God, from Hebrews XI.6. by Mr. Thomas Allen, late pastor of a church in the city of Norwich (London: Printed by A.M. and R.R. for Edward Giles, bookseller in Norwich, near the Market-place, 1683). Editor's address by Martin Fynch.
