= Itteringham =

Village in Norfolk, England

Coordinates: 52.83096°N 1.18288°E

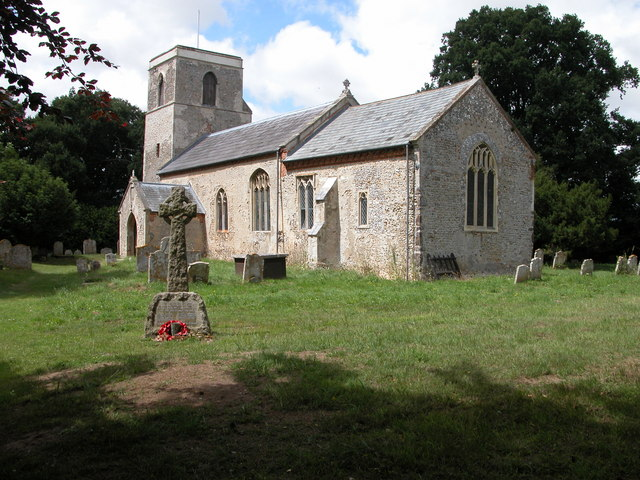
- St Mary's Church

- Location within Norfolk
- Area: 3.17 sq mi (8.2 km^{2})
- Population: 121 (2021 census)
  - Density: 38/sq mi (15/km^{2})
- OS grid reference: TG145306
- Civil parish: Itteringham
- District: North Norfolk
- Shire county: Norfolk
- Region: East
- Country: England
- Sovereign state: United Kingdom
- Post town: NORWICH
- Postcode district: NR11
- Dialling code: 01603
- UK Parliament: North Norfolk

Itteringham is a village and civil parish in the English county of Norfolk.

Itteringham is located 4 1/2 miles (7.2 km) north-west of Aylsham and 15 miles (24 km) north of Norwich.

== Correct pronunciation ==
"Ittringham"; "Ittrenhum"

== History ==
Itteringham's name is of Anglo-Saxon origin and derives from the Old English for Ytra's homestead.

In the Domesday Book, Itteringham is listed as a settlement of 9 households in the hundred of South Erpingham. In 1086, the village was divided between the East Anglian estates of King William I and William de Warenne.

Itteringham Watermill was built in 1722 and was used by Royal Air Force officers as dormitories and a mess hall whilst serving at RAF Matlaske.

== Geography ==
According to the 2021 census, Itteringham has a population of 121 people which shows a decrease from the 125 people recorded in the 2011 census.

== 1980 mid-air collision ==
Major Stephen Kaatz and 38 year old Lt-Col William Harold Olson flew to RAF Wainfleet, and collided in mid-air at around 2,000 ft, both in their Fairchild Republic A-10 Thunderbolt II aircraft, at Tuesday 18 November 1980 at 9.15am.

Kaatz ejected safely, and his aircraft crashed near the village, towards Saxthorpe. 44 year old David Green, of Wingfield House, was taken to Norwich hospital with a back injury, after being hit by debris, when out walking. He was a senior air traffic controller at Norwich Airport.

The day before, Hawker Siddeley Nimrod 'XV256', from RAF Kinloss, had crashed, killing two out of the twenty RAF personnel on board; it had flown through a flock of sea birds, damaging three of its four engines, on take off. Stephen Kaatz, from Jenison, Michigan landed in the pub car park.

Olson, born 20 December 1941 from DeBary, Florida, ejected over Winterton-on-Sea, to the east, and landed in the sea. An RAF rescue helicopter took off at 9.34am, to head to Itteringham, but at 9.40am was requested to rescue Lt-Col Olson instead. In the pilot seat was 28 year old Flt Lt Adrian Nockles, with winch operator John Reeson.

Olson would be killed, with a 38 year old RAF winchman, Master Air Load Master with 202 Sqn at RAF Coltishall, when a winch line snapped. The waves were around 15 ft high. The winchman was originally from Grantham in Lincolnshire, but born in Wick in Scotland, attending the Boys' Central School, and was awarded the George Medal, in August 1981. He had lived at Malton Close in Aylsham, where he is buried. An RAF training facility, in North Wales, was named after the winchman, in May 2018.

Another rescue helicopter, a Sikorsky MH-53 from the 67th Aerospace Rescue and Recovery Squadron at RAF Woodbridge, arrived around 10.10am, and two United States Air Force Pararescue, with full diving equipment, were dropped into the sea. Lt-Col Olson is buried at Hethersett parish church.

== Mannington Hall ==
Mannington Hall was originally built in the Fifteenth Century for the Lumnor family but was eventually rebuilt as the residence of the Walpole family.

== Amenities ==
The Walpole Arms Pub has stood in the village since 1813.

== Notable residents ==
- Sir John Potts, 1st Baronet- (1592-1673) politician, Lord of Mannington Hall.
- George Barker- (1913-1991) poet, lived & died in Itteringham.
- Robert Walpole, 10th Baron Walpole- (1938-2021) politician and peer, Lord of Mannington Hall.
- Alice Walpole OBE- (b.1963) diplomat, grew-up in Itteringham.
- Raffaella Barker- (b.1964) author, born in Itteringham.

== Governance ==
Itteringham is part of the electoral ward of Erpingham for local elections and is part of the district of North Norfolk.

The village's national constituency is North Norfolk, which has been represented by the Liberal Democrat Steff Aquarone MP since 2024.

== War Memorial ==
Itteringham War Memorial is a small wheel-headed cross in St. Mary's Churchyard which lists the following names for the First World War:

Rank	Name	Unit	Date of death	Burial/Commemoration
Sjt.	Leslie W. W. Gotts	Royal Garrison Artillery	26 Jul. 1916	St. Mary's Churchyard
Pte.	John Ayton	2nd Bn., Bedfordshire Regiment	12 Oct. 1916	Warlencourt British Cemetery
Pte.	John W. Harmer	2nd Bn., Bedfordshire Regt.	7 Jun. 1917	Menin Gate
Pte.	George Hannant	43 (Cameron Highlanders) Bn., CEF	1 Oct. 1918	Cantimpre Canadian Cem.
Pte.	Alfred Johnson	9th Bn., Royal Fusiliers	3 May 1917	Arras Memorial
Pte.	Henry S. Ayton	1st Bn., Northamptonshire Regiment	25 Aug. 1916	Étaples Military Cemetery
Pte.	Herbert J. Lake	6th Bn., Queen's Royal Regiment	17 Jul. 1917	Arras Memorial

The following names were added after the Second World War:

Rank	Name	Unit	Date of death	Burial/Commemoration
Mne.	Guy Davy	Royal Marines	2 Jul. 1943	Ss. Peter & Paul Churchyard
Pte.	James Baxter	5th Bn., Royal Norfolk Regiment	21 Jul. 1943	Kanchanaburi War Cemetery
