= Frances Egerton, Countess of Bridgewater =

English noblewoman; (1583–1636)

Frances Egerton
- Countess of Bridgewater
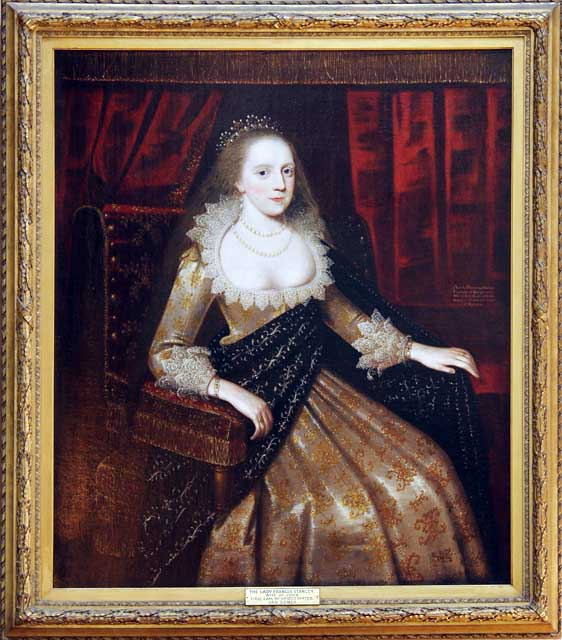
- portrait by Paul van Somer
- Born: May 1583
- Died: 11 March 1636 (aged 52)
- Noble family: Stanley
- Spouse: John Egerton, 1st Earl of Bridgewater
- Issue: Lady Frances Hobart; Lady Elizabeth Egerton; Lady Arabella Egerton; Lady Mary Egerton; Lady Penelope Egerton; Lady Catherine Egerton; Lady Magdalen Egerton; John Egerton, 2nd Earl of Bridgewater; Thomas Egerton; Alice Vaughan, Countess of Carbery
- Father: Ferdinando Stanley, 5th Earl of Derby
- Mother: Alice Spencer, Countess of Derby

Frances Egerton, Countess of Bridgewater (May 1583 – 11 March 1636), formerly Lady Frances Stanley, was an English art patron and book collector.

== Biography ==
Stanley was born in May 1583, the second daughter of Ferdinando Stanley, 5th Earl of Derby, and his wife, the former Alice Spencer. Her sisters were Anne Stanley, Countess of Castlehaven, and Elizabeth Stanley, Countess of Huntingdon. After her father died in 1594, her mother married the widower Thomas Egerton, 1st Viscount Brackley. Her mother arranged Stanley's marriage to her stepbrother, John Egerton, around 1601. In 1617, James I named her husband the first Earl of Bridgewater and thus she became the Countess of Bridgewater.

Stanley owned a substantial collection of books, catalogued in 1627 and amounting to 241 titles. Many of her books are inscribed with her initials F. B. Many of the works were Christian devotional literature by popular authors like William Perkins, Joseph Hall, and Francis Rous. It also included history and literature, including Aesop's Fables, Don Quixote, Plutarch's Lives, The Faerie Queene, and works by William Shakespeare. This was her personal collection, stored separately from her husband's larger household library, but incorporated into that library after her death. Augmented over generations, the formidable household collection became known as The Bridgewater Library, much of which is now owned by the Huntington Library in California.

Stanley was acquainted with a number of leading literary figures, including John Donne and John Milton. She, her mother, and her sisters were the subject of the verse dedication of John Davies of Hereford's The Holy Roode. Thomas Newton dedicated his Atropoïon delion to her mother and followed it with acrostic verses to Stanley and her sisters. John Attey dedicated his The First Booke of Ayres of Four Parts to Stanley and her husband. Her death was the occasion of a long funereal poem and acrostic by Robert Codrington. Milton's masque Comus, written to honor her husband's ascension to Lord President of Wales, was performed at Ludlow Castle in 1634 with her three youngest children, John, Thomas, and Alice, in the leading roles. Stanley also bequeathed books to her children, leaving devotional works to her daughters and a book for young gentleman readers to her son.

== Children ==
Frances Stanley and her husband John Egerton had eleven daughters and four sons, including:

- Lady Frances Egerton (1603-1664), married Sir John Hobart, 2nd Baronet
- Lady Elizabeth Egerton, married David Cecil, 3rd Earl of Exeter
- Lady Arabella Egerton, married Oliver St John, 5th Baron St John of Bletso
- Lady Mary Egerton, married Richard Herbert, 2nd Baron Herbert of Chirbury
- Lady Penelope Egerton, married Sir Robert Napier, 2nd Baronet
- Lady Catherine Egerton, married William Courten, son of Sir William Courten
- Lady Magdalen Egerton, married Sir Gervase Cutler
- John Egerton, 2nd Earl of Bridgewater (1623–1686)
- Thomas Egerton
- Lady Alice Egerton (d. 1689), married Richard Vaughan, 2nd Earl of Carbery
