= Edmund Moundeford =

English politician

- Born: United Kingdom
- Died: 11 May 1643

Sir Edmund Moundeford (1596 – May 1643) was an English politician who sat in the House of Commons at various times between 1628 and 1643.

Moundeford was the son of Edmund Moundeford of Mundford and Hockwold, Norfolk, and his first wife Frances Gawdy, daughter of Thomas Gawdy of Claxton, Norfolk. He attended school at Wymondham, Norfolk and was admitted at Caius College, Cambridge on 16 January 1612 at the age of 16. In 1628, he was elected Member of Parliament for Thetford and sat until 1629 when King Charles I of England decided to rule without parliament for eleven years. He was knighted on 9 December 1629. He was a friend of John Winthrop and was interested in trying to found a Puritan colony in the Caribbean.

In April 1640, Moundeford was elected MP for Norfolk in the Short Parliament. He was re-elected MP for Norfolk for the Long Parliament in November 1640. He sat until his death in 1643. By deed dated 10 September 1642, he left property consisting of marsh or fen ground in Feltwell, Norfolk, to pay for clothing for the poor of the village and a free school "for the teaching the children of the inhabitants grammar and other learning, freely". There was sufficient income to pay for eight almshouses at Feltwell.

Moundeford died without issue and was buried at Feltwell on 11 May 1643. He left much of his estate to his half-sister Elizabeth.

Moundeford had four half-sisters through his father's second marriage to Abigail Knyvett.

Parliament of England
Preceded by Sir John Hobart, 2nd Baronet; Framlingham Gawdy	Member of Parliament for Thetford; 1628–1629; With: Sir Henry Vane	Parliament suspended until 1640
Vacant Parliament suspended since 1629	Member of Parliament for Norfolk; 1640–1643; With: Sir John Holland, 1st Baronet 1640; Sir John Potts, 1st Baronet 1640–1643	Succeeded by Sir John Potts, 1st Baronet; Sir John Hobart, 2nd Baronet
