= Palgrave baronets =

Extinct baronetcy in the Baronetage of England

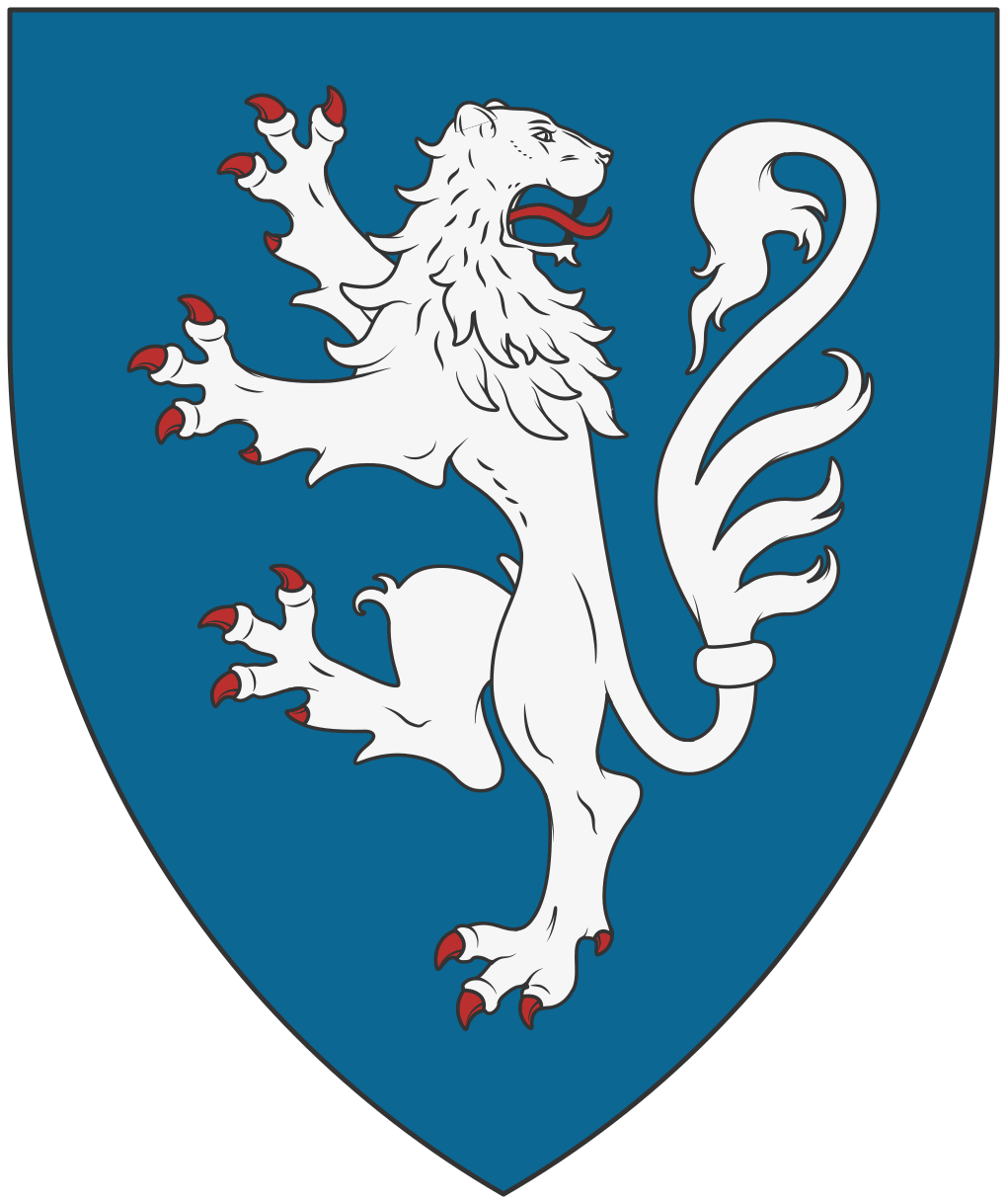
Arms of Palgrave of Norwood Barningham

The Palgrave Baronetcy, of Norwood Barningham in the County of Norfolk, was a title in the Baronetage of England. It was created on 24 June 1641 for John Palgrave, later member of parliament for Norfolk. The title became extinct on the death of the third Baronet in 1732.

== Palgrave baronets, of Norwood Barningham (1641) ==
- Sir John Palgrave, 1st Baronet (1605–1672)
- Sir Augustine Palgrave, 2nd Baronet (1629–1711)
- Sir Richard Palgrave, 3rd Baronet (1688–1732)
