= John Egerton, 1st Earl of Bridgewater =

English peer and politician

John Egerton KB, PC
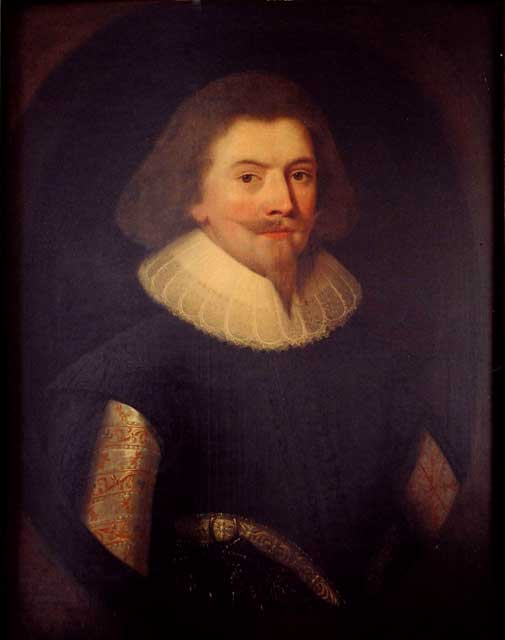

1st Earl of Bridgewater
- Reign: 1617–1649
- Successor: John Egerton, 2nd Earl of Bridgewater
- Born: 1579
- Died: 4 December 1649 (aged 69–70)
- Buried: Little Gaddesden
- Noble family: Egerton
- Spouse: Lady Frances Stanley
- Issue: Lady Elizabeth Egerton; Lady Mary Egerton; Lady Frances Hobart; Alice Vaughan, Countess of Carbery; Lady Arabella Egerton; James Egerton, Viscount Brackley; Charles Egerton, Viscount Brackley; John Egerton, 2nd Earl of Bridgewater
- Father: Thomas Egerton, 1st Viscount Brackley
- Mother: Elizabeth Ravenscroft

Egerton arms: Argent a lion rampant gules between three pheons sable

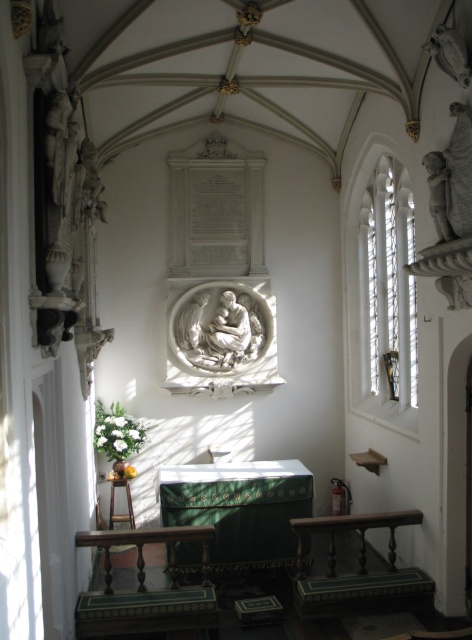
The Bridgewater Chapel at St. Peter and St. Paul Church, Little Gaddesden, where many Egerton family members are buried

John Egerton, 1st Earl of Bridgewater, KB, PC (1579 – 4 December 1649), was an English peer and politician from the Egerton family.

The son of Sir Thomas Egerton and Elizabeth Ravenscroft, he matriculated at Brasenose College, Oxford in 1589 at the age of 10, graduating as Bachelor of Arts in 1594.

Egerton served as Member of Parliament (MP) for Callington from 1597 to 1598, and for Shropshire in 1601. Knighted on 8 April 1599, he was Baron of the Exchequer of Chester from 1599 to 1605. In 1603, Sir Thomas was promoted Knight of the Bath and, in 1605, he proceeded Master of Arts from the University of Oxford. Having succeeded to his father's titles in March 1617, he was created Earl of Bridgewater on 27 May 1617.

Lord Bridgewater was sworn of the Privy Council in 1626. From 1605 to 1646, he was Custos Rotulorum of Shropshire and from 1628 to 1649 Custos Rotulorum of Buckinghamshire. Between 1631 and 1634, he was Lord President of Wales and Lord Lieutenant of Wales and the Marches of Herefordshire, Monmouthshire, Shropshire and Worcestershire.

John Milton's Comus celebrates his installation as Lord President of Wales. Lord Bridgewater died intestate and was buried at Little Gaddesden.

The 1st Earl of Bridgewater is commemorated by a memorial in the Bridgewater Chapel at St. Peter and St. Paul Church, Little Gaddesden, Hertfordshire. In the early 17th century, the 1st Earl's father purchased Ashridge House, one of the largest country houses in England, from Queen Elizabeth I, who inherited it from her father who had appropriated it after the dissolution of the monasteries in 1539. Ashridge House remained an Egerton family residence until the 19th century. The Egertons later built a domestic chapel with burial vault at Little Gaddesden Church, where many monuments commemorate the Dukes and Earls of Bridgewater and their relatives. Lord Bridgewater died on 4 December 1649.

== Family ==
On 27 June 1602, Egerton married Lady Frances Stanley, daughter of Ferdinando, 5th Earl of Derby and Lady Alice Spencer, Lord Bridgewater's step-mother (after Ferdinando Stanley's death, on 20 October 1600, Lady Alice had married John's father Thomas Egerton, 1st Viscount Brackley). John and Frances had eight children:

- Lady Elizabeth Egerton (d. 1688), married David Cecil, 3rd Earl of Exeter
- Lady Mary Egerton (d. 1659), married Richard Herbert, 2nd Baron Herbert of Chirbury
- Lady Frances Egerton (d.1664), married Sir John Hobart, 2nd Baronet
- Lady Alice Egerton (d. 1689), married Richard Vaughan, 2nd Earl of Carbery as his third wife.
- Lady Arabella Egerton (d. 1669), married Oliver St John, 5th Baron St John of Bletso
- James Egerton, Viscount Brackley (1616–1620), died young
- Charles Egerton, Viscount Brackley (b. 1623), died young
- John Egerton, 2nd Earl of Bridgewater (1623–1686)

Political offices
Preceded by Sir Richard Leveson	Custos Rotulorum of Shropshire; 1605–1646	Vacant English Interregnum
Preceded by The Duke of Buckingham	Custos Rotulorum of Buckinghamshire; 1628–1649	Vacant English Interregnum
Preceded by The Earl of Northampton	Lord President of Wales, Lord Lieutenant of Wales, Herefordshire, Monmouthshire, Shropshire and Worcestershire; 1631–1642	Vacant English Interregnum
Peerage of England
New creation	Earl of Bridgewater; 2nd creation 1617–1649	Succeeded by John Egerton
Preceded by Thomas Egerton	Viscount Brackley; 1617–1649	Succeeded by John Egerton
