= Sir John Potts, 1st Baronet =

Sir John Potts, 1st Baronet (c. 1592–1673) was an English politician who sat in the House of Commons from 1640 to 1648 and in 1660.

Potts was the son of John Potts and his wife Ann Dodge, daughter of John Dodge. In November 1640, Potts was elected Member of Parliament for Norfolk in the Long Parliament. He was knighted on 9 August 1641 and created baronet of Mannington in the County of Norfolk, on 14 August 1641. Nevertheless, he supported the Parliamentarian side and sat until he was excluded under Pride's Purge in 1648.

In 1660, Potts was elected MP for Great Yarmouth in the Convention Parliament.

Potts died in 1673 and was buried at Mannington, Norfolk.

Potts "was obliged to marry a daughter of — Goodsill, esq. a favourite at court, with a small fortune", according to a writer in the time of the Court of Wards, and had three daughters. He married secondly Ursula Spelman widow and a daughter of Sir John Willoughby of Risley, Derbyshire. They had three sons John, Francis and Charles and a daughter Ursula.

Parliament of England
Preceded by Sir John Holland, Bt; Sir Edmund Moundeford	Member of Parliament for Norfolk; 1640–1648; With: Sir Edmund Moundeford 1640; Sir John Hobart, Bt 1641–1647; Sir John Palgrave, Bt 1647–1648	Succeeded by Not represented in the Rump Parliament
Baronetage of England
New creation	Baronet (of Mannington); 1641–1673	Succeeded by John Potts
