= Sir John Palgrave, 1st Baronet =

Member of Parliament of England

Sir John Palgrave, 1st Baronet (1605–1672) was an English politician who sat in the House of Commons from 1647 to 1648.

Palgrave was baptised on 26 June 1605 the son of Augustine Palgrave and his wife, Elizabeth Willoughby of Northwood Barningham, Norfolk. He entered the Inner Temple, and was a Gentleman of the Privy Chamber. He was created a baronet by Charles I on 24 June 1641.

In 1647, Palgrave was elected Member of Parliament for Norfolk in the Long Parliament. In December 1648, he was excluded from parliament under Pride's Purge.

Palgrave died at the age of 66.

Palgrave married firstly Elizabeth Jermy, daughter of John Jermy of Gunton, Norfolk. He married secondly, Anne Gascoigne, widow of Cotton Gascoigne and daughter of William de Grey, of Martin, Norfolk, and Islington Middlesex. He was succeeded in the baronetcy by his son Augustine.

Parliament of England
Preceded by Sir John Holland, Bt (Sir) John Potts	Member of Parliament for Norfolk; 1647–1648; With: (Sir) John Potts	Succeeded by Not represented in Rump Parliament
Baronetage of England
New creation	Baronet (of Norwood Barningham); 1641–1672	Succeeded by Augustine Palgrave
