= Potts baronets =

Extinct baronetcy in the Baronetage of England

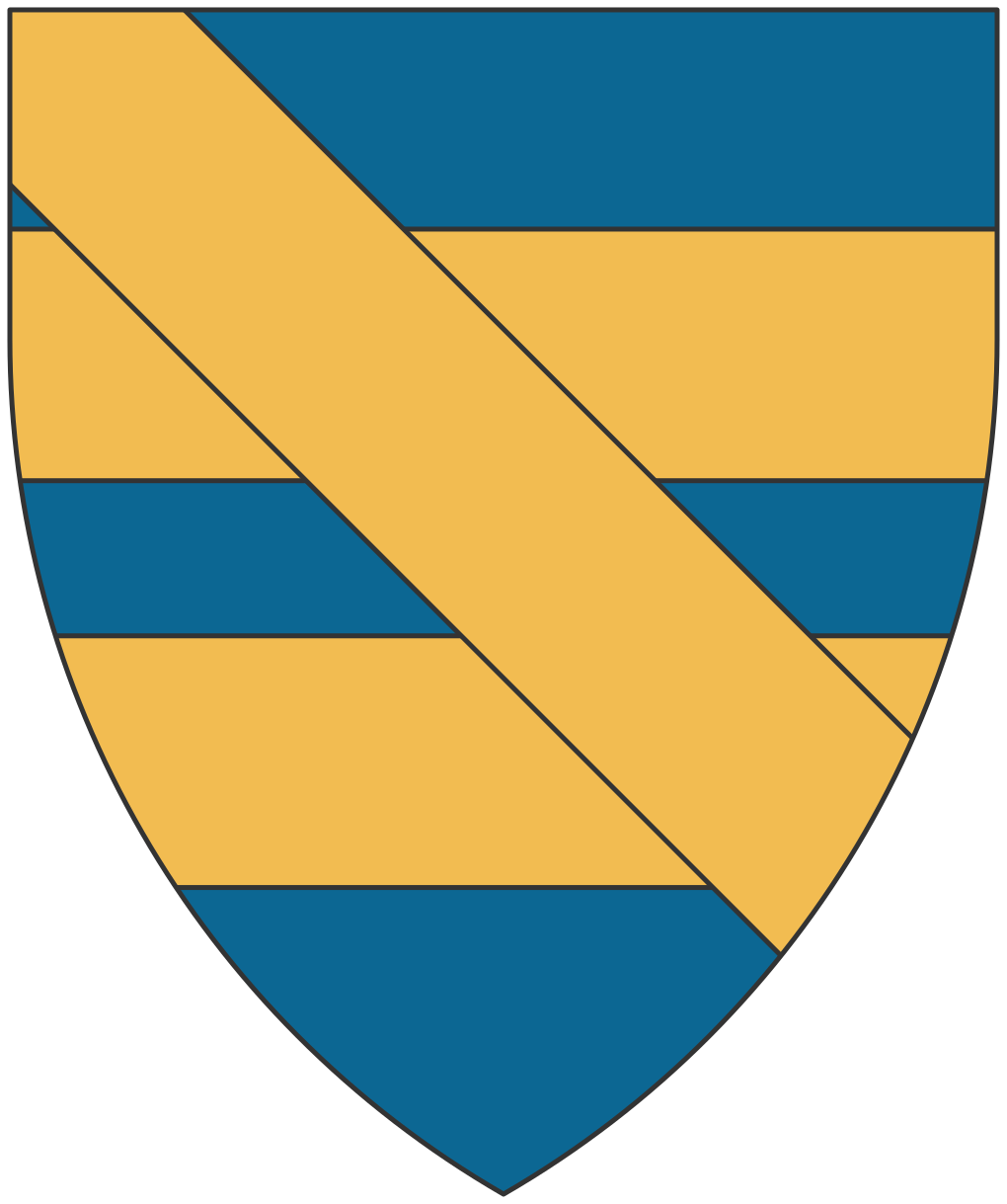
Arms of Potts of Mannington

The Potts Baronetcy, of Mannington in the County of Norfolk, was a title in the Baronetage of England. It was created on 14 August 1641 for John Potts, Member of Parliament for Norfolk and Great Yarmouth. The title became extinct on the death of the fifth Baronet in 1732.

== Potts baronets, of Mannington (1641) ==
- Sir John Potts, 1st Baronet (died 1673)
- Sir John Potts, 2nd Baronet (died c. 1690)
- Sir Roger Potts, 3rd Baronet (c. 1641–1711)
- Sir Algernon Potts, 4th Baronet (c. 1675–1716)
- Sir Charles Potts, 5th Baronet (1676–1732)
