= Alice Vaughan, Countess of Carbery =

English musician and actor

Alice Vaughan
- Countess of Carbery
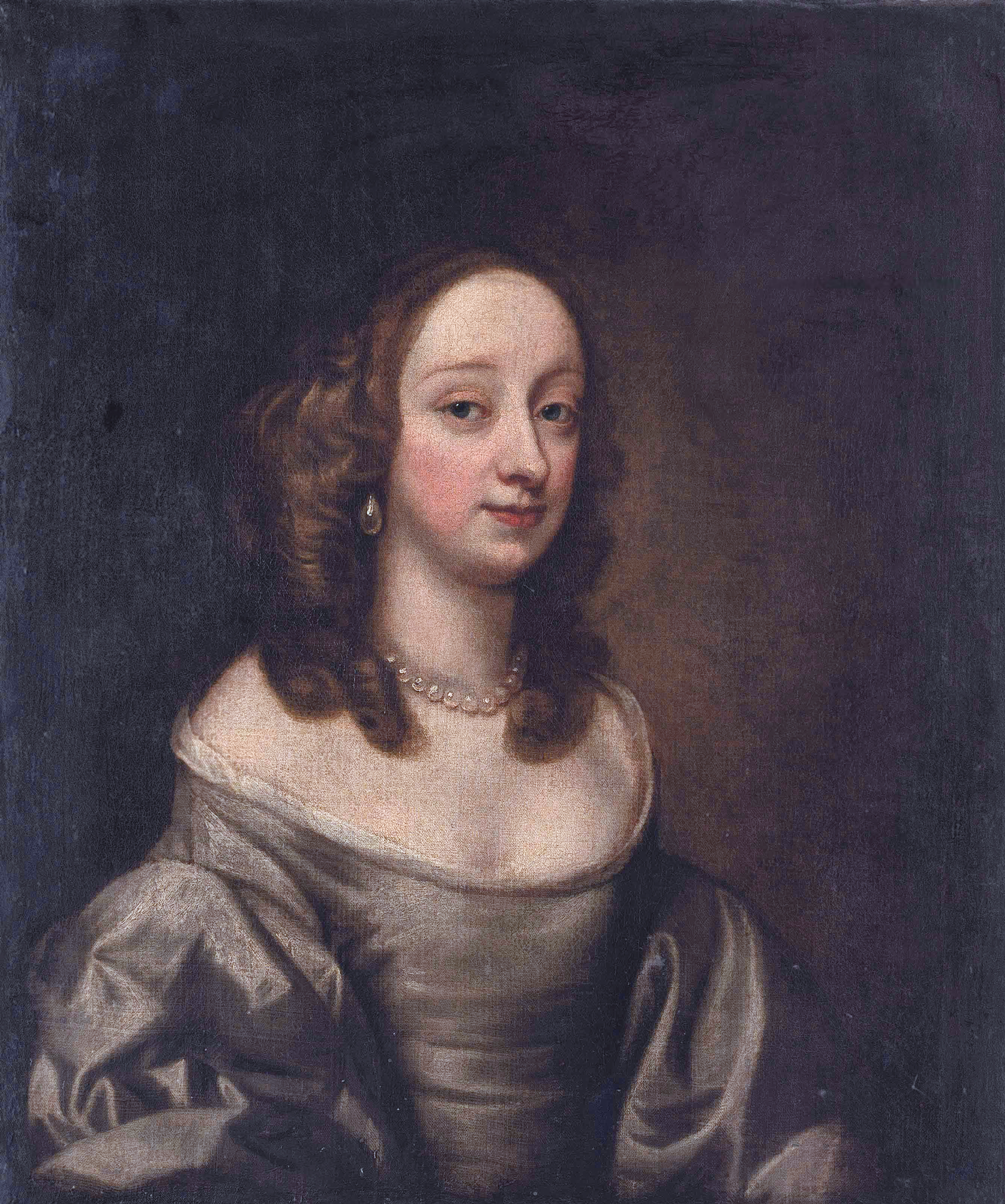
- Alice Vaughan, Countess of Carbery, circle of John Hayls
- Born: 1619
- Died: 1689 (aged 69–70)
- Noble family: Egerton
- Spouse: Richard Vaughan, 2nd Earl of Carbery
- Father: John Egerton, 1st Earl of Bridgewater
- Mother: Lady Frances Stanley

Alice Vaughan, Countess of Carbery (née Lady Alice Egerton; 1619-1689) was an English musician and performer who acted in two notable masques: Aurelian Townshend's Tempe Restored (1632), and John Milton's Maske Performed at Ludlow Castle (1634).

Lady Alice was the youngest of eleven daughters born to John Egerton, 1st Earl of Bridgewater and Lady Frances Stanley. She starred in the singing role of The Lady in Milton's Maske when it was performed at Ludlow Castle in 1634, in honor of her father's appointment as Lord President of Wales. Her younger brothers, John and Thomas, appeared as The Lady's Brothers. Henry Lawes, who wrote the music for the Maske, was Alice Egerton's music teacher. She was participating in a family tradition: her grandmother, Alice Spencer, Countess of Derby, a well-known patron of the arts, had herself appeared in Ben Jonson's The Masque of Queens in 1609 and was the honoree of Milton's masque Arcades.

Lady Alice married Richard Vaughan, 2nd Earl of Carbery in 1652, when she was aged about 33 and he was approximately twenty years older; they had no children. The earl succeeded Alice's father as Lord President of Wales following the Restoration of the monarchy in 1660, but he was later removed from the post.
