= Richard Bagge =

English cricketer

Personal information
- Full name: Richard Bagge
- Born: 17 June 1810; Stradsett, Norfolk, England
- Died: 5 April 1891 (aged 80); Gaywood, Norfolk, England
- Batting: Unknown
- Relatives: Thomas Bagge (son); William Bagge (twin-brother)

Domestic team information
- Years: Team
- 1836: Norfolk

Career statistics
Competition	First-class
Matches	2
Runs scored	6
Batting average	1.50
100s/50s	–/–
Top score	4
Catches/stumpings	2/–
- Source: Cricinfo, 23 June 2013

Richard Bagge (17 June 1810 – 5 April 1891) was an English cricketer. Bagge's batting style is unknown. He was born at Stradsett, Norfolk. He was born at Stradsett Hall, and was educated at Charterhouse School. He married Pleasance Hulton on 1 October 1835, having six children with her. Bagge made two first-class cricket appearances for Norfolk in 1836, with both appearances coming against Yorkshire at New Ground, Norwich, and Hyde Park Ground, Sheffield. He scored 6 runs in his two matches, with a high score of 4. A merchant by trade, Bagge later served as a Justice of the Peace, and as the High Sheriff of Norfolk in 1879. He died at Gaywood Hall in the village of Gaywood, Norfolk on 5 April 1891. His twin-brother, William, also played first-class cricket, later acquiring the title of the 1st Baronet of the Bagge Baronetcy. His son, Thomas, also played first-class cricket.
