= Tivetshall =

- Civil parish
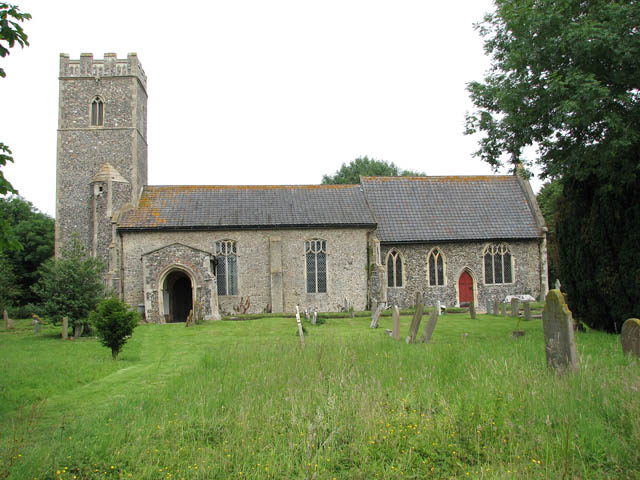
- St Margaret's church
- Interactive map of Tivetshall
- Coordinates: 52.434°N 1.192°E
- Country: England
- Primary council: South Norfolk
- County: Norfolk
- Region: East of England
- Constituency: Waveney Valley
- Tivetshall: 2019
- Status: Parish
- Main settlements: Tivetshall St Margaret and Tivetshall St Mary

Area
  - Total: 11.54 km^{2} (4.46 sq mi)

Population (2011)
  - Total: 591
  - Density: 51.2/km^{2} (133/sq mi)
- Website: https://www.tivpc.co.uk/

Tivetshall is a civil parish in the South Norfolk district, in the county of Norfolk, England. The parish includes the villages of Tivetshall St Margaret and Tivetshall St Mary. In 2011 the area the parish currently covers had a population of 591. The parish touches Aslacton, Burston and Shimpling, Dickleburgh and Rushall, Great Moulton, Gissing, Pulham Market and Wacton.

== History ==
The name "Tivetshall" means 'Nook of land'. Tivetshall was recorded in the Domesday Book as Teveteshala/Teve/Tivetessala/Totessalla. The parish was formed on 1 April 2019 from the parishes of Tivetshall St Margaret and Tivetshall St Mary.

== See also ==
- Tivetshall railway station
