= Aslacton Windmill =

Windmill in Aslacton, Norfolk, England

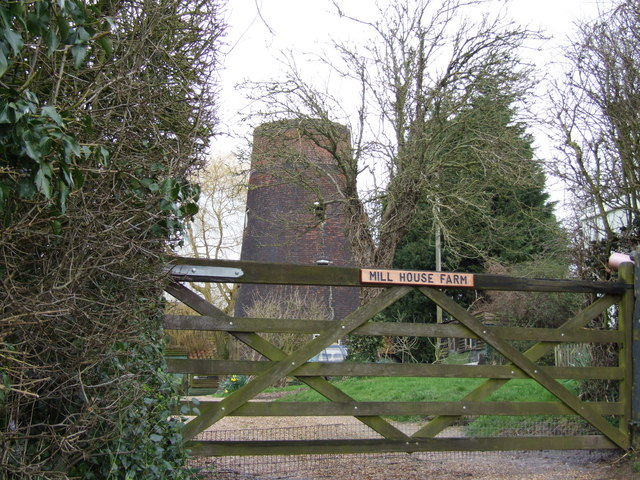
- The derelict mill in 2007
- Interactive map of Aslacton Windmill

Origin
- Mill name: Aslacton Mill
- Mill location: TM 1575 9037
- Coordinates: 52°28′07″N 1°10′29″E
- Operator: Private
- Year built: 1834

Information
- Purpose: Corn mill
- Type: Tower mill
- Storeys: Four storeys
- No. of sails: Four sails
- Type of sails: Double Patent sails
- Winding: Fantail
- Fantail blades: Six blades
- Auxiliary power: Steam engine, later replaced by an oil engine
- No. of pairs of millstones: Two pairs

Aslacton Mill is a Grade II listed tower mill at Aslacton, Norfolk, England which is derelict.

== History ==
Aslacton Mill was probably built in 1834, although there was a mill in Aslacton as early as 1751. Benjamin Gibson is the first recorded miller and the mill was owned by Barnabas Burroughes from 1872 until his death on 18 December 1899. The mill passed to his widow and after her death on 4 August 1903, the mill was offered for sale by auction at the Railway Inn, Tivetshall on 25 August 1903. The top bid of £350 was below the reserve price, so the mill remained unsold. The mill was sold in October 1903 to Samuel Fickling. He died in March 1913, leaving the mill to his widow. On her death in May 1915 the mill passed to their son Arthur Robinson Fickling, who sold it to Selina Herring in October 1915 for £400. The mill was sold to John Colchester in 1929. The sails were removed c1930 and the mill worked by steam engine. Colchester worked the mill by steam engine, and then an oil engine, until 1938. The derelict tower still stands, containing some machinery.

== Description ==
Aslacton mill is a four storey tower mill which had a boat shaped cap winded by a six bladed fantail. It had four double Patent sails and drove two pairs of millstones. Unusually, these were driven overdrift by wind and underdrift by engine. The tower is about 33 feet (10.06 m) from base to curb level. The upright shaft and great spur wheel for the engine drive remain in situ.

== Millers ==
- Benjamin Gibson 1841-68
- Barnabas Borroughes 1872-98
- Jane Burroughes 1900
- George Leonard Smith 1900-01
- Robert William Drane 1904-08
- William Samuel Herring 1912
- Selina Herring 1915-16
- Charles William Herring 1922-28
- John Corben Colchester 1929-38
  - Samuel McMeakin 1937

Reference for above:-
