= Brampton Gurdon (Norfolk MP) =

British Liberal Party and Whig politician

Member of Parliament for West Norfolk
- In office 30 March 1857 – 24 July 1865 Serving with George Bentinck
- Preceded by: William Bagge; George Bentinck
- Succeeded by: William Bagge; Thomas de Grey

Personal details
- Born: John Brampton Gurdon; 25 September 1797
- Died: 28 April 1881 (aged 83)
- Party: Liberal
- Other political affiliations: Whig (until 1859)
- Spouse: Henrietta Susannah Ridley-Colborne (m. 1828)
- Children: Four, including Robert and William
- Parent(s): Theophilus Thornhagh Gurdon; Anne Mellish

John Brampton Gurdon, known as Brampton Gurdon, (25 September 1797 – 28 April 1881) was a British Liberal Party and Whig politician.

== Family ==
Born in 1797, Gurdon was the son of Theophilus Thornhagh Gurdon and Anne Mellish. He married Henrietta Susannah Ridley-Colborne — daughter of Nicholas Ridley-Colborne and Charlotte Steele — in 1828, and they had four children:

- Charlotte Gurdon (died 1868)
- Amy Louisa Gurdon (died 1864)
- Robert Thornhagh Gurdon (1829–1902)
- William Brampton Gurdon (1840–1910)

== Career ==
Gurdon was elected a Whig MP for West Norfolk at the 1857 general election and was re-elected as a Liberal in the next general election in 1859. Later, at the 1865 general election, he was defeated.

Gurdon was also a Deputy Lieutenant of Norfolk, Justice of the Peace for Norfolk, and, in 1855, High Sheriff of Norfolk.

Parliament of the United Kingdom
Preceded by William Bagge; George Bentinck	Member of Parliament for West Norfolk; 1857–1865; With: George Bentinck	Succeeded by William Bagge; Thomas de Grey
