= William Brampton Gurdon =

English politician (1840–1910)

Sir William Brampton Gurdon KCMG CB JP
- William Brampton Gurdon

Member of Parliament for North Norfolk
- In office 1899 – January 1910
- Preceded by: Herbert Cozens-Hardy
- Succeeded by: Noel Noel-Buxton

Lord Lieutenant of Suffolk
- In office 1907–1910
- Preceded by: Frederick Hervey, 3rd Marquess of Bristol
- Succeeded by: Courtenay Warner

Personal details
- Born: 5 September 1840
- Died: 31 May 1910 (aged 69)
- Spouse: Lady Eveline Camilla Wallop (m. 1888; died 1894)
- Parents: Brampton Gurdon (father); Henrietta Susanna Ridley-Colborne (mother)
- Relatives: 1st Baron Colborne (maternal grandfather); Robert Gurdon, 1st Baron Cranworth (brother); 5th Earl of Portsmouth (father-in-law)
- Education: Eton College
- Alma mater: Trinity College, Cambridge

Sir William Brampton Gurdon KCMG CB JP (5 September 1840 – 31 May 1910) was a British civil servant who became a Liberal Party politician.

== Early life ==
Gurdon was the youngest son of Brampton Gurdon (MP for West Norfolk) of Letton, Norfolk and his wife Henrietta Susanna, daughter of the 1st Baron Colborne. He was educated at Eton and at Trinity College, Cambridge, where he graduated in 1863 with a BA degree. His elder brother, Robert, would also enter politics and served as an MP from 1880 to 1895.

== Career ==
Gurdon entered the Treasury as a clerk in 1863, and became private secretary to William Ewart Gladstone when he was Chancellor of the Exchequer from 1865 to 1866 and when Prime Minister from 1868 to 1874. In 1879 he served as a special commissioner in South Africa following the Anglo-Zulu War, and then in 1881 on the Royal Commission appointed to draw up the Pretoria Convention.

=== Parliament ===
At the 1885 general election Gurdon stood unsuccessfully in South West Norfolk. He was unsuccessful again at Rotherhithe in 1886 and in Colchester at a by-election in 1888.

He finally entered Parliament on his fourth attempt, when he was elected at a by-election in March 1899 as the Member of Parliament (MP) for North Norfolk. He held the seat for 11 years, until he stood down at the January 1910 general election. His major achievement as an MP was successfully bringing the Deceased Wife's Sister's Marriage Act 1907 through Parliament; this had been a controversial proposal for over seventy years.

He was also a Justice of the Peace (JP) for Suffolk, and a member of East Suffolk County Council. He was sworn as a Privy Counsellor in July 1907, and became Lord Lieutenant of Suffolk in October 1907.

== Personal life ==
In 1888 he married Lady Eveline Camilla Wallop, daughter of the 5th Earl of Portsmouth. She died in 1894. There is a memorial to them both in the church of St Edmund in Assington, Suffolk.

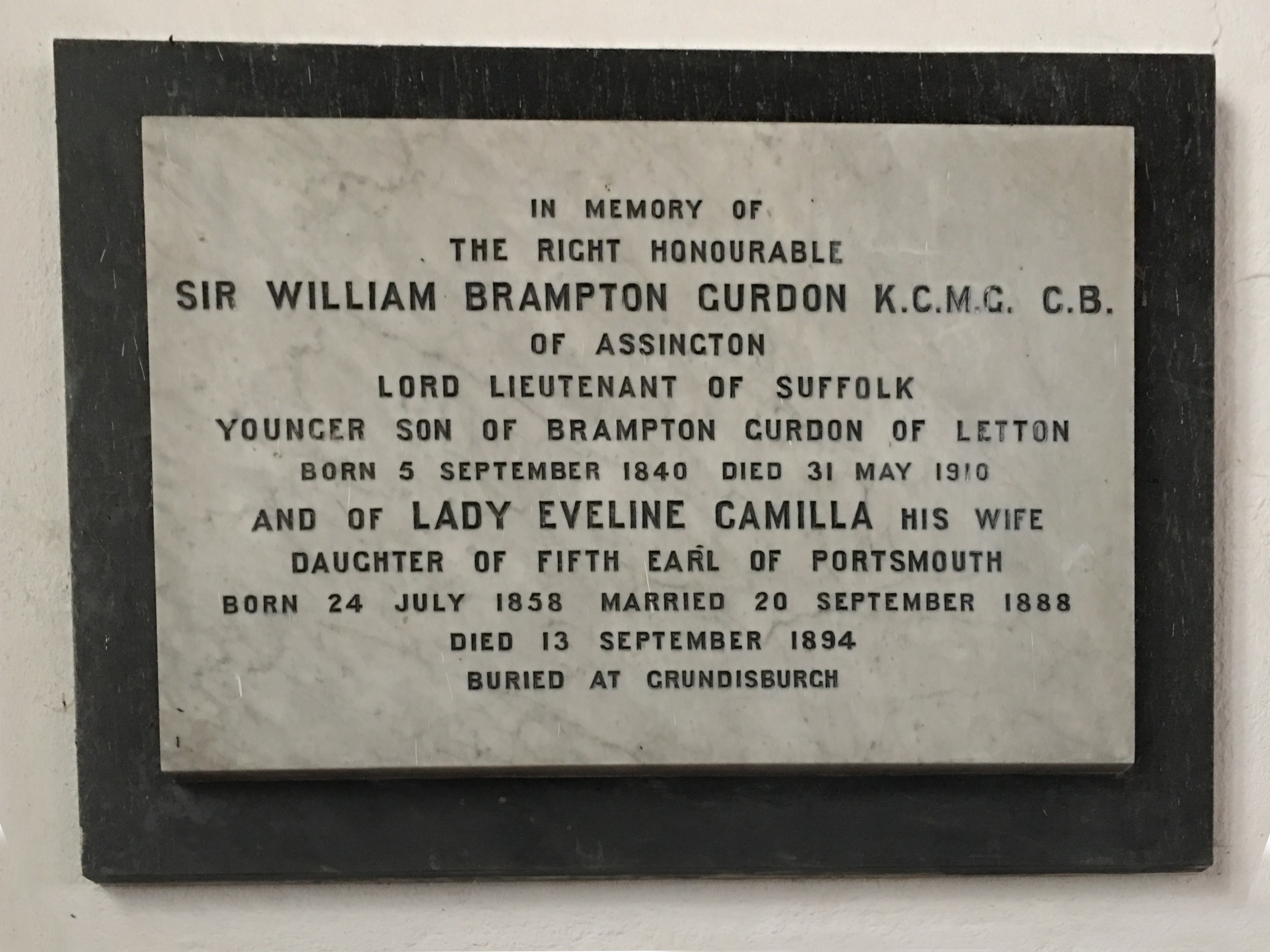
Memorial to Sir William Brampton Gurdon in the church of St Edmund in Assington, Suffolk

Parliament of the United Kingdom
Preceded by Herbert Cozens-Hardy	Member of Parliament for North Norfolk; 1899–January 1910	Succeeded by Noel Noel-Buxton
Honorary titles
Preceded by Frederick Hervey, 3rd Marquess of Bristol	Lord Lieutenant of Suffolk; 1907–1910	Succeeded by Courtenay Warner
