= Edward Coke (1824–1889) =

The Hon. Edward Keppel Wentworth Coke (20 August 1824 – 26 May 1889) was a British soldier and Whig politician.

== Background ==
Coke was the second son of Thomas Coke, 1st Earl of Leicester, by his second wife Lady Anne Amelia, daughter of William Keppel, 4th Earl of Albemarle. Thomas Coke, 2nd Earl of Leicester was his elder brother and the Hon. Wenman Coke was his younger brother.

The bowler hat was created for Edward Coke in 1849.

== Military and political career ==
Coke was a captain in the Scots Fusiliers. He was returned to Parliament for Norfolk West in 1847, a seat he held until 1852. He also served as High Sheriff of Derbyshire in 1859.

He stood as the Liberal Unionist candidate for South Derbyshire in 1886.

== Family ==
Coke married the Hon. Diana Agar-Ellis, daughter of George Agar-Ellis, 1st Baron Dover, in 1851. He died in May 1889, aged 64. His wife survived him by just over a year and died in July 1890.

Parliament of the United Kingdom
Preceded by William Bagge; William Lyde Wiggett Chute	Member of Parliament for Norfolk West; 1847–1852; With: William Bagge	Succeeded by William Bagge; George Bentinck
