= Chaloner William Chute =

English barrister

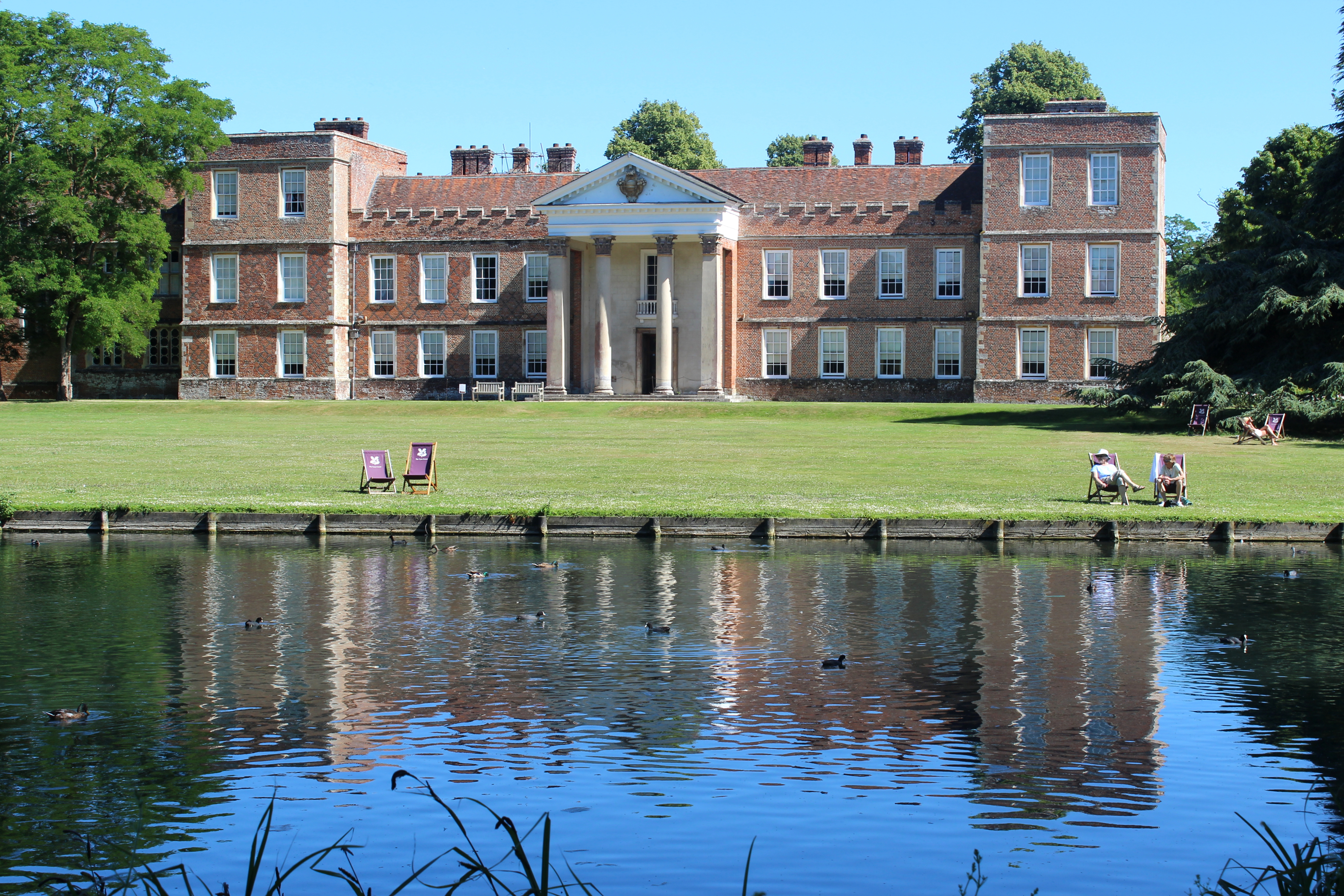
The Vyne house

Chaloner William Chute (1 August 1838 – 1892) was an English barrister and Fellow of Magdalen College, University of Oxford. He was the heir to The Vyne estate near Basingstoke, Hampshire.

== Life ==
He was the son of William Lyde Wiggett, who took the surname Chute on inheriting The Vyne. He matriculated at Balliol College, Oxford in 1857, graduating B.A. in 1861, M.A, in 1864. A Fellow of Magdalen College from 1861, he was called to the bar at Lincoln's Inn and gave up his fellowship in 1875. He was elected a fellow of Winchester College.

== Family ==
Chute married in 1875 Eleanor Jane Portal, second daughter of Wyndham Spencer Portal. They had three sons:

- Sir Charles Lennard Chute MC (1879–1956), a barrister.
- Rev. John Chaloner Chute (born 1881)
- Rev. Anthony William Chute OBE (born 1884)
