= Bagge baronets =

Baronetcy in the Baronetage of the United Kingdom

- Escutcheon of the Bagge baronets of Stradsett Hall
- Creation date: 1867
- Status: extant
- Seat(s): Stradsett Hall, Norfolk
- Motto: Spes est in Deo, My hope is in God

The Bagge Baronetcy, of Stradsett Hall in the County of Norfolk, is a title in the Baronetage of the United Kingdom. It was created on 13 April 1867 for William Bagge, Conservative Member of Parliament for West Norfolk. The sixth Baronet was Chairman of the West Norfolk District Council between 1976 and 1977.

== Bagge baronets, of Stradsett Hall (1867) ==
- Sir William Bagge, 1st Baronet (1810–1880)
- Sir William Henry Ernest Bagge, 2nd Baronet (1840–1881)
- Sir Alfred Thomas Bagge, 3rd Baronet (1843–1916). Bagge inherited the title when his elder brother, William, died childless. He married Millicent Case Morris in 1872, with whom he had six children, four sons and two daughters. He served in the Royal Navy as commander (1881 census) and as a justice of the peace for Norfolk. He was succeeded by his second son, Alfred William Francis Bagge, his eldest son having died in infancy.
- Sir Alfred William Francis Bagge, 4th Baronet (1875–1939)
- Sir John Picton Bagge, CMG, 5th Baronet (1877–1967)
- Sir John Alfred Picton Bagge, 6th Baronet (1914–1990)
- Sir (John) Jeremy Picton Bagge, 7th Baronet (born 1945)

The heir apparent is Alfred James John Bagge (born 1980).
