= Theophilus Russell Buckworth =

Theophilus Russell Buckworth, Sr. DL (23 December 1794 – 16 February 1857) was an English landowner who served as the High Sheriff of Norfolk in 1845 and deputy lieutenant for the county of Lincolnshire in 1830.

He was born in Finsbury Square, London, the son of Thomas and Mary Buckworth of Spalding, Lincolnshire, and was educated at Trinity College, Cambridge. He died at his home, Cockley Cley Hall, in Cockley Cley, Norfolk, in 1857. His daughter Martha married William Lyde Wiggett Chute in 1837.
