= William Lyde Wiggett Chute =

English barrister, landowner and politician

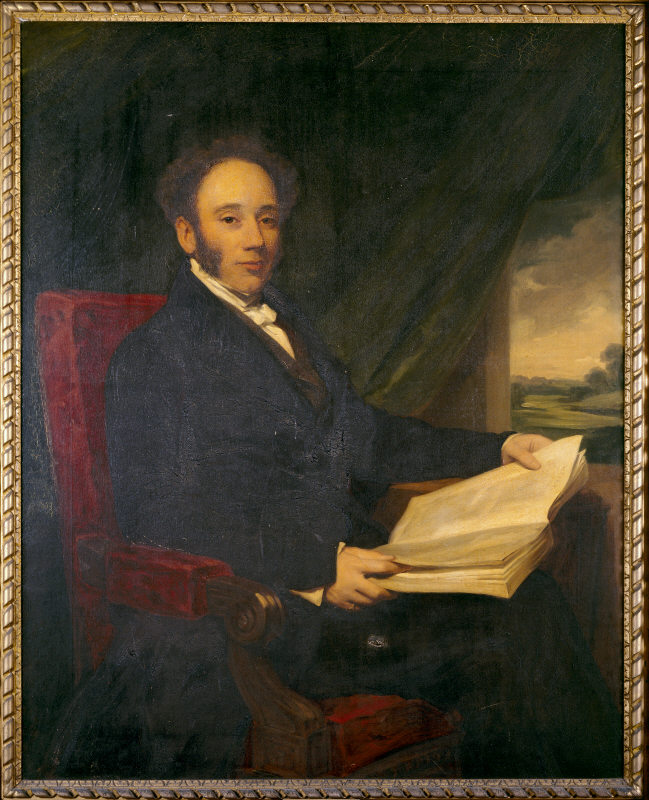
- William Lyde Wiggett Chute by Frederick Richard Say, oil on canvas, 1843, Vyne Estate, Hampshire
- Born: William Lyde Wiggett; 1800
- Died: 6 July 1879 (aged 78–79); The Vyne, Hampshire, England
- Occupations: Landowner, barrister, member of Parliament

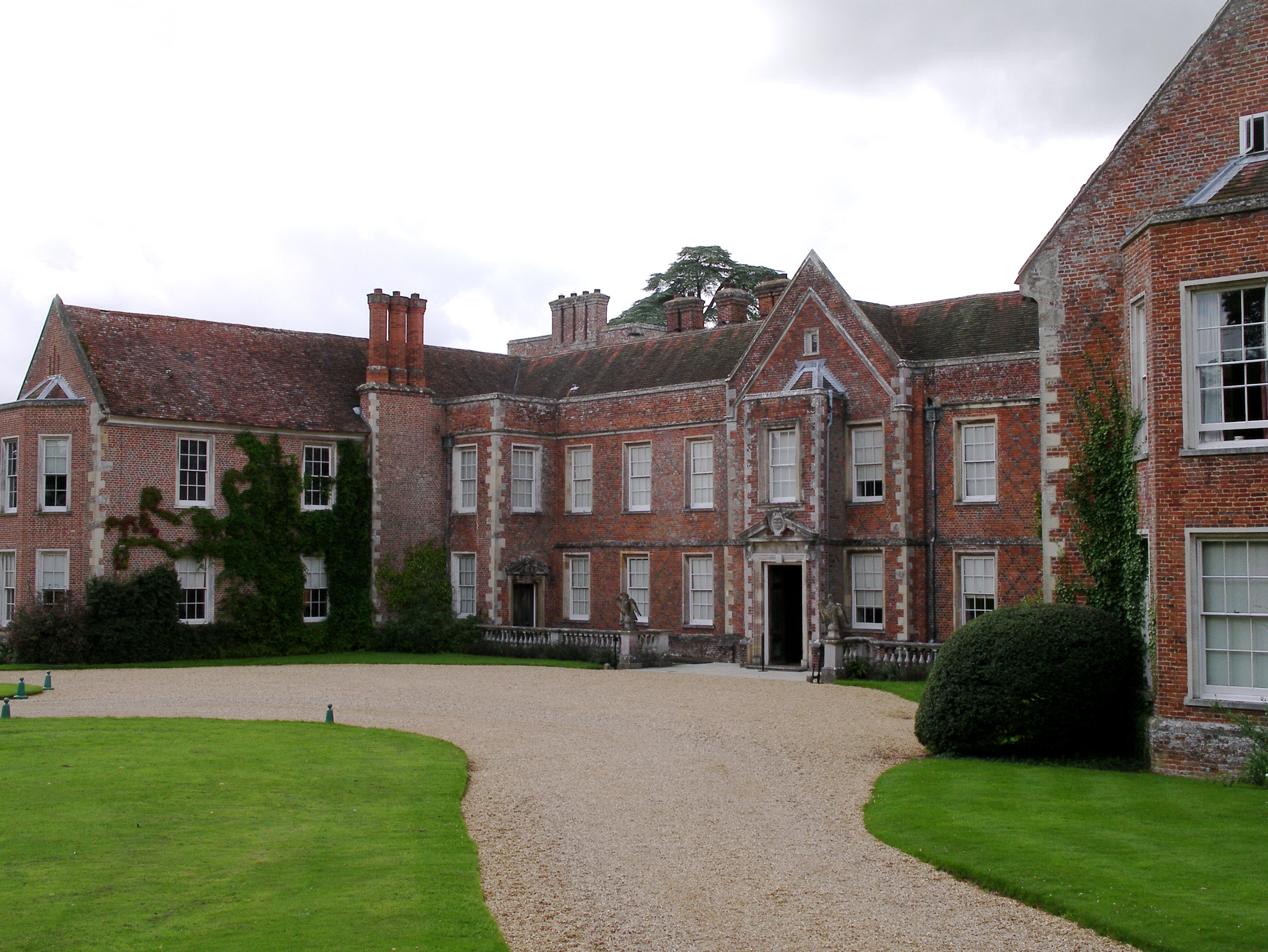
The Vyne, Hampshire

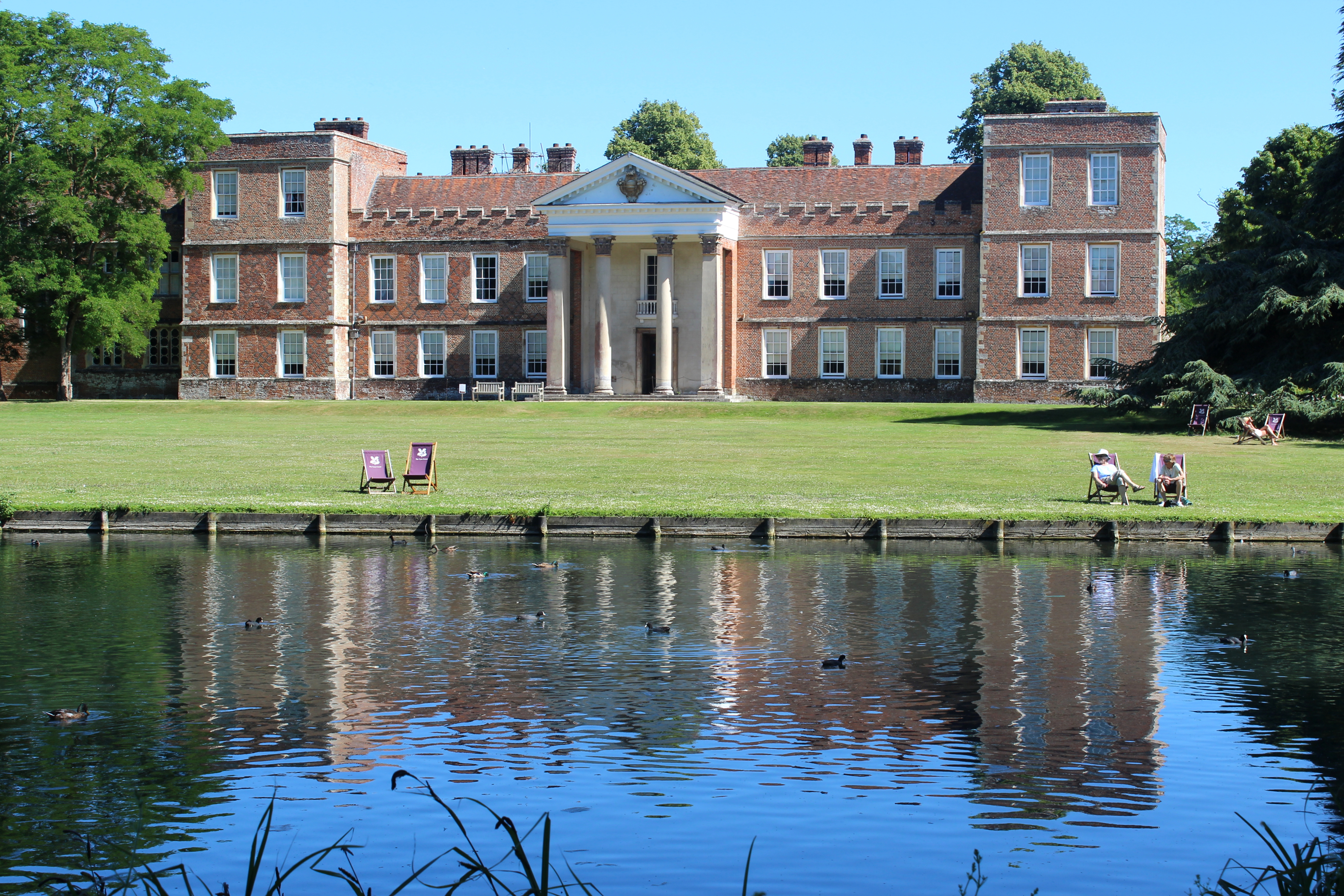
The Vyne, north-west aspect

William Lyde Wiggett Chute (1800 – 6 July 1879) was an English landowner and barrister. He was High Sheriff of Norfolk and Conservative Party member of Parliament for West Norfolk. He inherited The Vyne estate in Hampshire and Pickenham Hall in Norfolk, and greatly improved the condition of The Vyne.

== Early life and family ==
William Lyde Wiggett was born in 1800, the second son of the Reverend James Wiggett, rector of Crudwell, Wiltshire, and his wife Rachel. His mother was the daughter and heiress of Samuel Lyde of Ayott in Hampshire. Chute attended Winchester School and graduated from University College, Oxford, in 1821 with a bachelor's degree and received his master's degree in 1825. He was called to the bar at Middle Temple in 1827.

He married Martha, daughter of Theophilus Russell Buckworth of Cockley Cley Hall, Norfolk, in 1837.

== Career ==
In 1827, Wiggett inherited the estates of The Vyne in Basingstoke, Hampshire, and Pickenham Hall in Norfolk, through the Reverend Thomas Vere Chute. Thereafter, by royal licence, he took the name and arms of Chute. He served as High Sheriff of Norfolk in 1831 and was a justice of the peace. Chute was the Conservative member of Parliament for West Norfolk from 1837 to 1847.

He sold his Norfolk estate and lived at The Vyne from the death of Elizabeth Chute in 1842, widow of William Chute, until his death in 1879. During this time he greatly improved the estate, particularly the access routes which were known for their poor quality. Horace Walpole had described them in the eighteenth century as so bad that the house "must be approached upon stilts". Chute's improvements were recorded in articles that he wrote for the journal of the Royal Agricultural Society of England.

He was painted by society portraitist Frederick Richard Say in 1843. The painting is located at the Vyne Estate, Hampshire. He was a member of The Athenæum.

Chute was one of the members of the provisional committee of the Lynn and Ely Railway in 1844.

== Death and legacy ==
Chute died at The Vyne on 6 July 1879. He was succeeded by his son Chaloner William Chute (born 1838), a barrister and fellow of Magdalen College, Oxford.

Parliament of the United Kingdom
Preceded by Sir Jacob Astley, Bt	Member of Parliament for West Norfolk; 1837–1847; With: William Bagge, 1837–1847	Succeeded by Hon. Edward Coke
