= William Tyssen-Amherst, 1st Baron Amherst of Hackney =

British politician (1835–1909)

The Right Honourable The Lord Amherst of Hackney DL JP
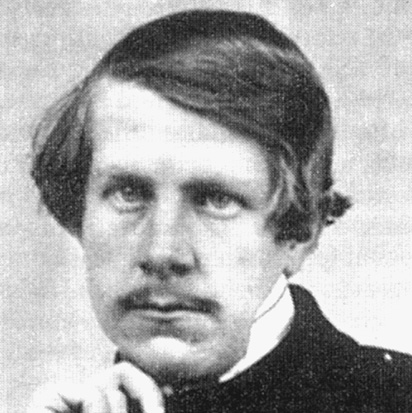

Member of Parliament for West Norfolk
- In office 27 April 1880 – 18 December 1885
- Preceded by: New constituency
- Succeeded by: Thomas Leigh Hare

Personal details
- Born: 25 April 1835
- Died: 16 January 1909 (aged 73)
- Citizenship: British
- Party: Conservative
- Spouse: Margaret Susan Mitford (m. 1865)
- Children: 7
- Education: Eton College
- Alma mater: Christ Church, Oxford

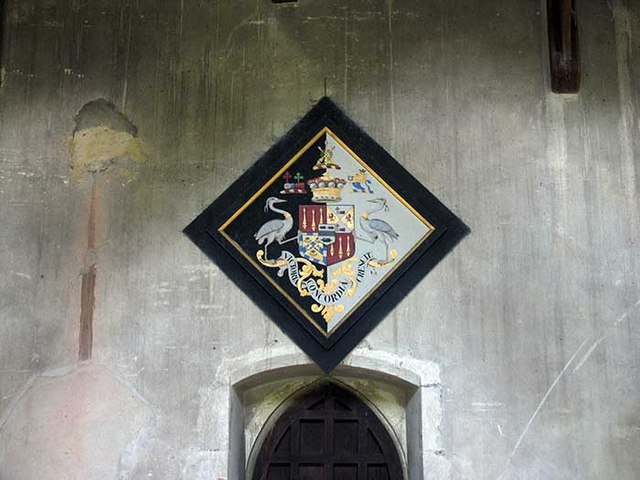
Funeral hatchment of William Amhurst Tyssen-Amherst, 1st Baron Amherst, in the Church of St Michael and All Angels, Didlington, Norfolk. Arms: Amhurst of four quarters with inescutcheon of Mitford

William Amhurst Tyssen-Amherst, 1st Baron Amherst of Hackney, DL, JP (25 April 1835 – 16 January 1909) was a British Conservative Member of Parliament and collector of books and works of art.

== Background and education ==
Born William Amhurst Daniel-Tyssen, he was the eldest son of William George Daniel-Tyssen, High Sheriff of Norfolk in 1843, who was the son of William George Daniel, of Foley House, near Maidstone, Kent, High Sheriff of Kent in 1825, and his wife Amelia Amherst, the daughter of Captain John Amherst and Mary Tyssen, heiress of Foulden Hall, Norfolk. Amherst's mother was Mary, daughter of Andrew Fountaine, of Narford Hall, Norfolk. In 1852, he and his father assumed by Royal licence the surname of Tyssen-Amhurst. However, in 1877 he again changed it, to Tyssen-Amherst, also by Royal licence. Tyssen-Amherst was educated at Eton and Christ Church, Oxford.

== Political career ==
In 1880, he was elected to Parliament for West Norfolk, a seat he held until 1885, and then represented South West Norfolk until 1892. The latter year he was raised to the peerage as Baron Amherst of Hackney, in the County of London, with remainder, in default of male issue, to his eldest daughter Mary and her issue male. Apart from his parliamentary career Tyssen-Amherst also served as High Sheriff of Norfolk in 1866 and as deputy lieutenant of Middlesex and was a justice of the peace for Norfolk, Middlesex and Westminster.

== Collector ==
Tyssen-Amherst is chiefly remembered as a collector of books, manuscripts, antique furniture and other works of art. He became famous for his Egyptian collection. In his country home, Didlington Hall, he built a museum for his rapidly growing Egyptian collection. In 1906, he was forced to sell a large portion of his collection after discovering that his estate and certain trust funds had been entirely dissipated at the hands of an untrustworthy solicitor, Charles Cheston, under whose management they had been placed. He lived only six weeks following the first Sotheby's auction from this collection.

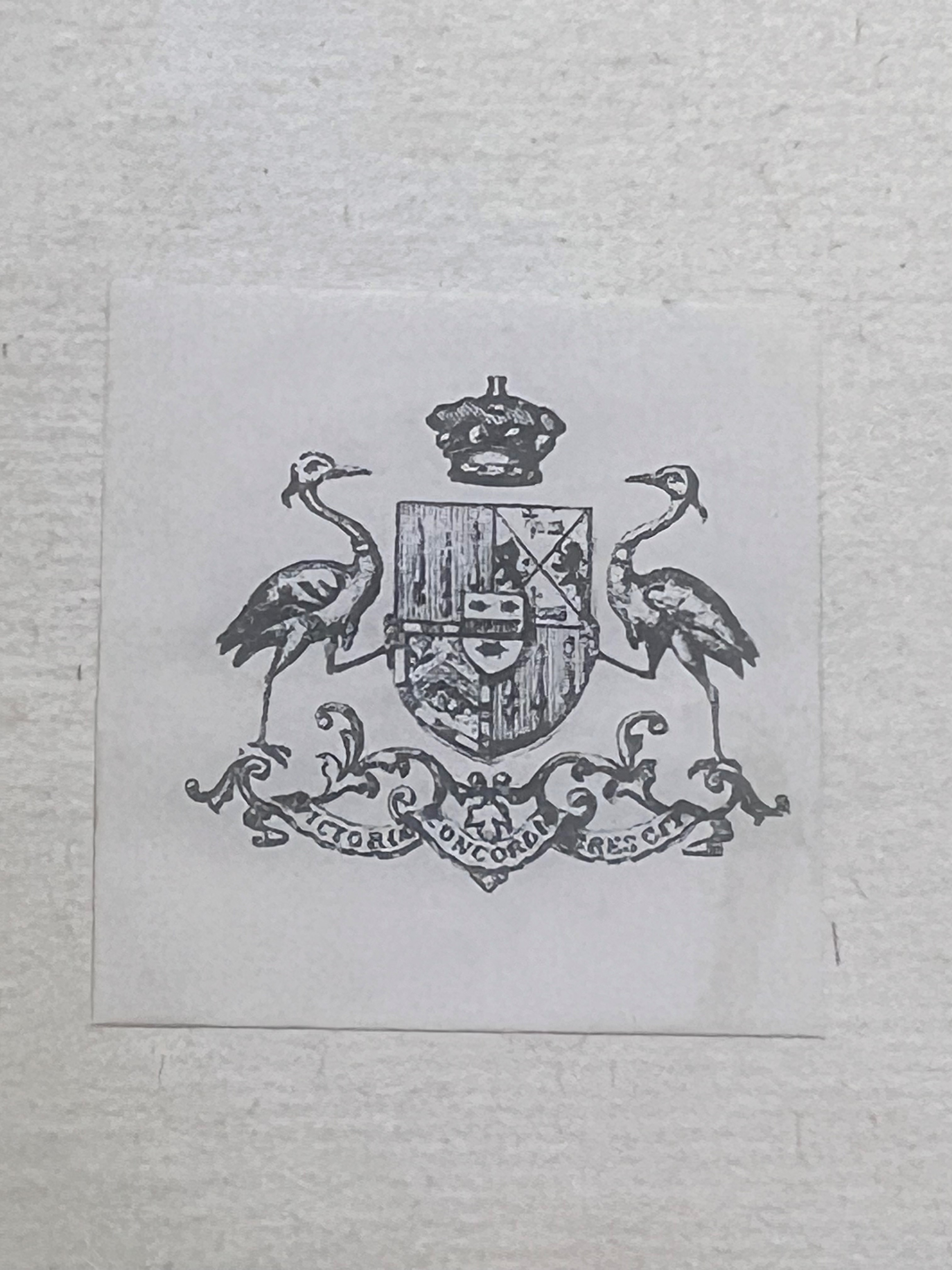

His name is noted at the Carter gallery display in the Swaffham Museum in Norfolk, suggesting that Tyssen-Amherst's collection of ancient papyri and Egyptian figures was seen by a young Howard Carter. The Museum records reveal that in 1882 he exhibited six "life size Egyptian figures" at Swaffham assembly rooms. A copy of the catalogue describes the figures he exhibited which included a figure of a Bedouin chief. He also exhibited a Thutmose III brick circa 1330bc, excavated from the banks of the Nile. Amherst's collection included the lower section of a 20th Dynasty tomb robbery papyri otherwise described as the Papyrus Leopold II, which is in the possession of the Morgan Library & Museum, New York.

His rare book collection included the "only genuine perfect copy known" of Recuyell of the Historyes of Troye, King Charles I's personal copy of the Cambridge Bible, and a Gutenberg Bible (No. 45).

== Family ==
Lord Amherst of Hackney married Margaret Susan Mitford, only child of Admiral Robert Mitford, in 1856. Susan Mitford was a lineal descendant of politician Robert Mitford and Philadelphia Wharton, first cousin (once removed) of poet and journalist John Mitford, third cousin (three times removed) of both English Attorney General Lord Redesdale and William Mitford, a sixth cousin (twice removed) to the "Mitford Sisters", and a distant cousin of author Mary Russell Mitford. They had seven daughters:

- Mary Rothes Margaret ("May"), born 1857, who succeeded to his title;
- Sybil Margaret ("Sib"), born 1858;
- Florence Margaret ("Flo" or "Fluff"), born 1860;
- Margaret Mitford ("Maggie"), born 1864;
- Alicia Margaret ("Ally"), born 1865, a botanist and author, married Evelyn Cecil, 1st Baron Rockley;
- Geraldine Margaret ("Cherry"), born 1867, married Malcolm Drummond of Megginch, parents of John Drummond, 15th Baron Strange and Victoria Drummond;
- Beatrice Margaret ("Bee"), born 1869.

All of the girls were named after their mother, Margaret.

Lord Amherst died in London, in January 1909, aged 73, and was succeeded in the barony according to the special remainder by his eldest daughter Mary.

== See also ==
- Amherst papyri

== Notes ==
Parliament of the United Kingdom
Preceded by George Bentinck and William Bagge	Member of Parliament for West Norfolk; 1880–1885; With: with George Bentinck, to 1884; Clare Sewell Read, from 1884	constituency abolished
New constituency	Member of Parliament for South West Norfolk; 1885–1892	Succeeded by Sir Thomas Leigh Hare
Honorary titles
Unknown	High Sheriff of Norfolk; 1866–1867	Unknown
Peerage of the United Kingdom
New creation	Baron Amherst of Hackney; 1892–1909	Succeeded by Mary Cecil
