= 1871 West Norfolk by-election =

UK Parliamentary by-election

The 1871 West Norfolk by-election was held on 8 February 1871. The by-election was held due to the succession to a peerage of the incumbent Conservative MP Thomas de Grey. It was won by the unopposed Conservative candidate George Bentinck.
