= Tivetshall St Mary =

Village in Norfolk, England

Coordinates: 52.42872°N 1.18898°E

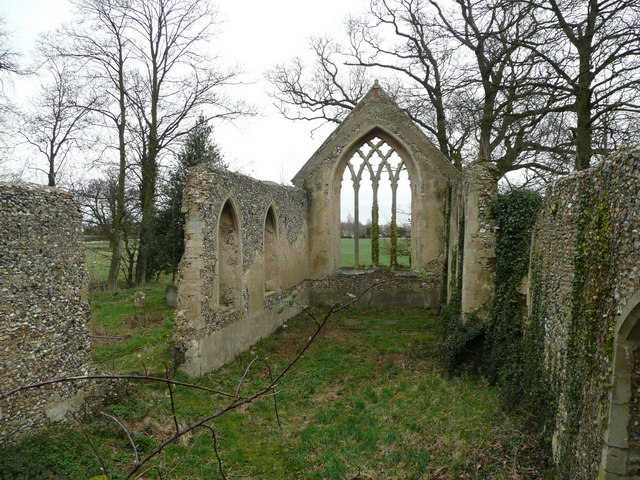
- Ruins of Tivetshall St. Mary church

- Location within Norfolk
- Area: 4.65 km^{2} (1.80 sq mi)
- Population: 298 (2011)
  - Density: 64/km^{2} (170/sq mi)
- OS grid reference: TM169859
- Civil parish: Tivetshall
- District: South Norfolk
- Shire county: Norfolk
- Region: East
- Country: England
- Sovereign state: United Kingdom
- Post town: NORWICH
- Postcode district: NR15
- Dialling code: 01379
- Police: Norfolk
- Fire: Norfolk
- Ambulance: East of England
- UK Parliament: Waveney Valley

Tivetshall St Mary is a village and former civil parish, now in the parish of Tivetshall, in the South Norfolk district in the county of Norfolk, England. It covered an area of 4.65 km^{2} (1.80 sq mi) and had a population of 302 in 117 households at the 2001 census, the population falling to 298 at the census 2011. On the 1st of April 2019 the parish was merged with Tivetshall St Margaret to form Tivetshall.

The villages name means 'Nook of land'. It has been suggested that the first element may be related to a late northern English dialectical, 'tewhit' meaning 'lapwing'. 'St. Mary' from the church dedication.
