= Sir Henry Dashwood, 3rd Baronet =

British politician

Sir Henry Watkin Dashwood, 3rd Baronet (30 August 1745 – 10 June 1828) was an English landowner and politician who sat in the House of Commons between 1775 and 1795.

== Early life ==
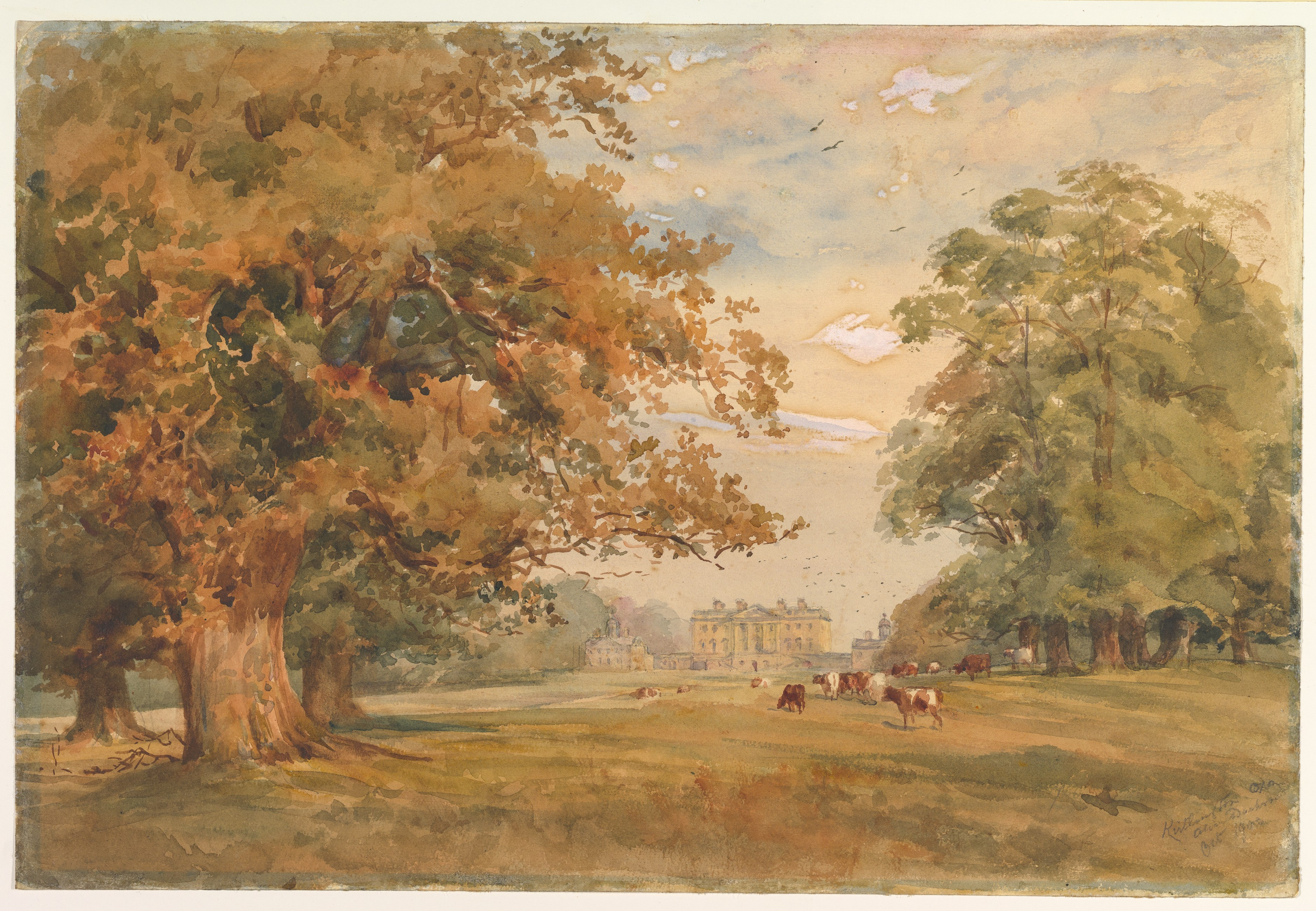
View of Kirtlington Park by Susan Dashwood 1900

Dashwood was the eldest surviving son of Sir James Dashwood, 2nd Baronet of Kirtlington Park, Oxfordshire and his wife Elizabeth Spencer, daughter of Edward Spencer of Rendlesham, Suffolk. He matriculated at Brasenose College, Oxford in 1763 and undertook a Grand Tour in 1768. He was extremely extravagant and in 1775 his father had to pay off his debts amounting to £25,000.

== Political career ==
In 1774 Dashwood contested Wigtown Burghs on the interest of his brother-in-law John Stewart, 7th Earl of Galloway. With each candidate receiving only two of the four votes, Dashwood's opponent was initially declared the winner, but on petition the result was reversed and Dashwood was returned as Member of Parliament. He voted in support of Lord North in the 1770s.

In 1779, Dashwood succeeded to the baronetcy on the death of his father on 10 November. He married Helen Mary Graham, daughter of John Graham of Kinross on 17 July 1780. Helen's uncles were MPs William and Robert Mayne and in 1780 he decided to stand at Canterbury, which had been a Mayne seat.

Dashwood was unsuccessful at Canterbury and equally unsuccessful in obtaining a lucrative government office. In 1783 he was appointed Gentleman of the Privy Chamber, an honorary appointment. After he came into his inheritance Dashed sold most of the family estate to pay further debts.

Dashwood was a friend of the Duke of Marlborough and was returned unopposed on the Duke's interest at the pocket borough of Woodstock at the 1784 election. He was returned unopposed at each election until 1820.

Dashwood tried several times in 1794 to persuade William Pitt the Younger to give him a peerage, as he was a loyal supporter of the government. Unhappily for Dashwood no preferment was forthcoming.

== Later life and legacy ==
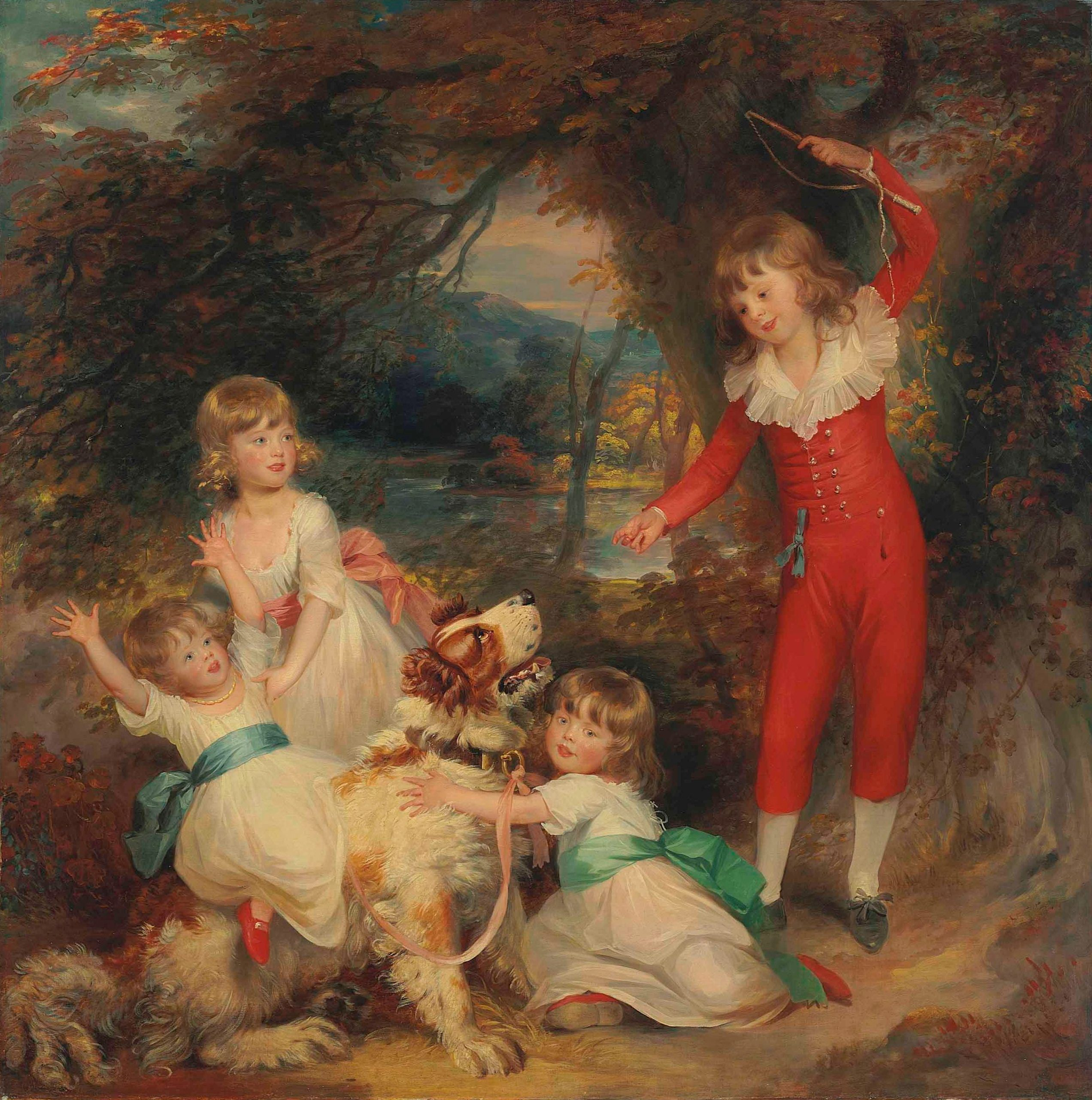
Portrait of the children of Sir Henry Watkin Dashwood, 3rd Baronet (1745–1828), by Sir William Beechey

Dashwood died on 10 June 1828. He and his wife had four sons and two daughters, including:

- Anna Maria, married John Loftus, 2nd Marquess of Ely
- Sir George Dashwood, 4th Baronet (9 July 1829 – 7 December 1869), married Sarah Marianne Rowley. Their daughter, Susan Caroline Dashwood, married Charles George Cholmondeley, Viscount Malpas and became the mother of George Cholmondeley, 4th Marquess of Cholmondeley.
- Georgiana Carolina, married Sir Jacob Astley, 6th Baronet

Parliament of Great Britain
Preceded by William Norton	Member of Parliament for Wigtown Burghs; 1775–1780	Succeeded by William Adam
Preceded by William Eden; Viscount Parker	Member of Parliament for Woodstock; 1784–1801; With: Francis Burton 1784–1790; Lord Henry Spencer 1790–1795; Ralph Payne 1795–1799; Charles Moore 1799–1801	Succeeded by Parliament of the United Kingdom
Parliament of the United Kingdom
Preceded by Parliament of Great Britain	Member of Parliament for Woodstock; 1801–1820; With: Charles Moore 1801–1802; Charles Abbot 1802–1806; William Eden 1806–1810; George Eden 1810–1812, 1813–1814; William Thornton 1812–1813, 1814–1818; Lord Robert Spencer 1818–1820	Succeeded by John Gladstone; James Langston
Baronetage of England
Preceded by James Dashwood	Baronet (of Northbrooke); 1779–1828	Succeeded by George Dashwood
