= George Bentinck (Norfolk MP) =

British politician (1803–1886)

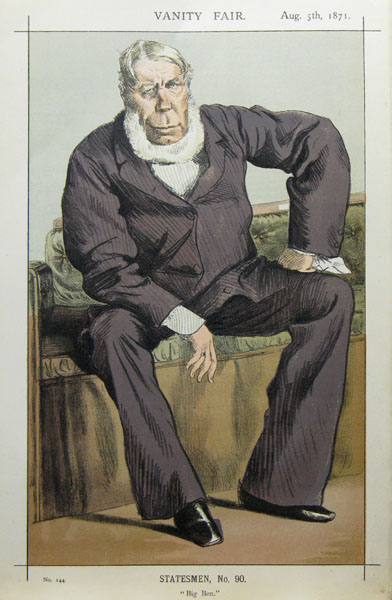
"Big Ben" Bentinck caricatured by James Tissot in Vanity Fair, August 1871

George William Pierrepont Bentinck DL JP (17 July 1803 – 20 February 1886) was a British Conservative politician.

== Background ==
Bentinck was the son of Vice-Admiral William Bentinck, son of Captain John Bentinck, son of Willem Bentinck van Rhoon, younger son of William Bentinck, 1st Earl of Portland. His mother was Lady Frances Augusta Eliza, daughter of Charles Pierrepont, 1st Earl Manvers.

== Political career ==
After unsuccessfully contesting a by-election in 1843 for the borough of Kendal, Bentinck was elected to the House of Commons at his next attempt, when he was returned unopposed at the 1852 general election as one of the two Members of Parliament (MPs) for the Western division of Norfolk. He held that seat until he stood down at the 1865 general election, but returned to Parliament at an unopposed by-election in 1871. He resigned from the Commons in 1884.

He also served as a deputy lieutenant and justice of the peace for Norfolk.

== Personal life ==
Bentinck died unmarried in February 1886, aged 82.

Parliament of the United Kingdom
Preceded by William Bagge; Hon. Edward Coke	Member of Parliament for Norfolk West; 1852 – 1865; With: William Bagge 1852–1857; Brampton Gurdon 1857–1865	Succeeded by Sir William Bagge, Bt; Hon. Thomas de Grey
Preceded by Sir William Bagge, Bt; Hon. Thomas de Grey	Member of Parliament for Norfolk West; 1871 – 1884; With: William Bagge to 1880; William Tyssen-Amherst from 1880	Succeeded by Clare Sewell Read; William Tyssen-Amherst
