= Charles Chute =

English barrister, landowner, farmer, politician and baronet

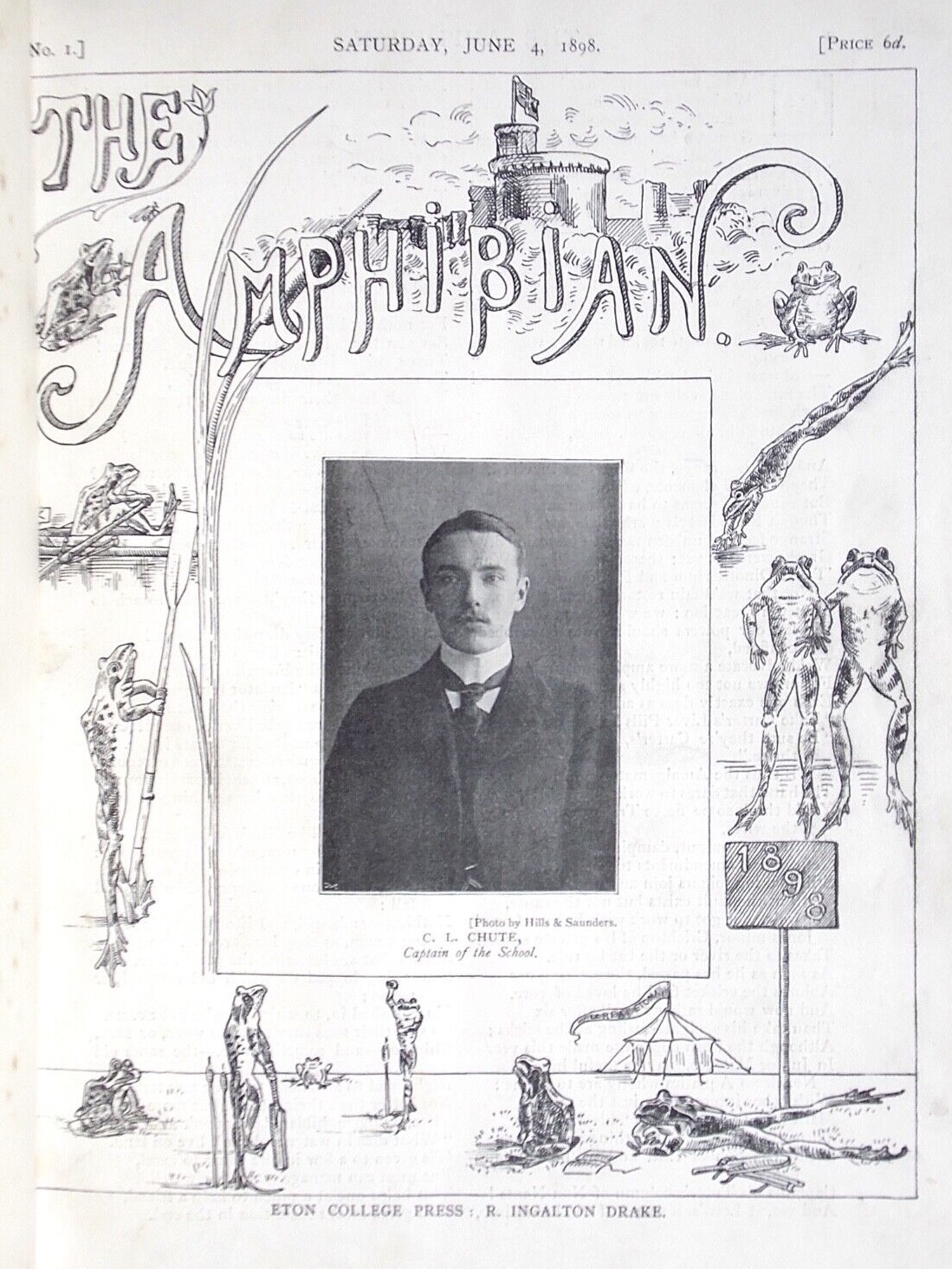
Chute on the cover of the Eton college magazine, 4 June 1898

Sir Charles Lennard Chute, 1st Baronet MC (6 May 1879 – 29 September 1956), was an English barrister, landowner, farmer, politician, and baronet.

== Life ==
Chute was the son of Chaloner William Chute, a barrister. He was educated at Eton, where in 1898 he was Captain of the School, and at Magdalen College, Oxford, then qualified as a barrister at the Inner Temple. In August 1912, at Radley, he married Laura Joan Baker, the daughter of the late Robert Lowbridge Baker, Vicar of Ramsden.

Serving in the British Army during the First World War, Chute rose from staff captain to brigade major of 164 Infantry Brigade and in 1919 was awarded the Military Cross. The citation stated that the decoration was awarded "for great gallantry and devotion to duty as Brigade Major at the Bac de Wavrin on 16th October 1918."

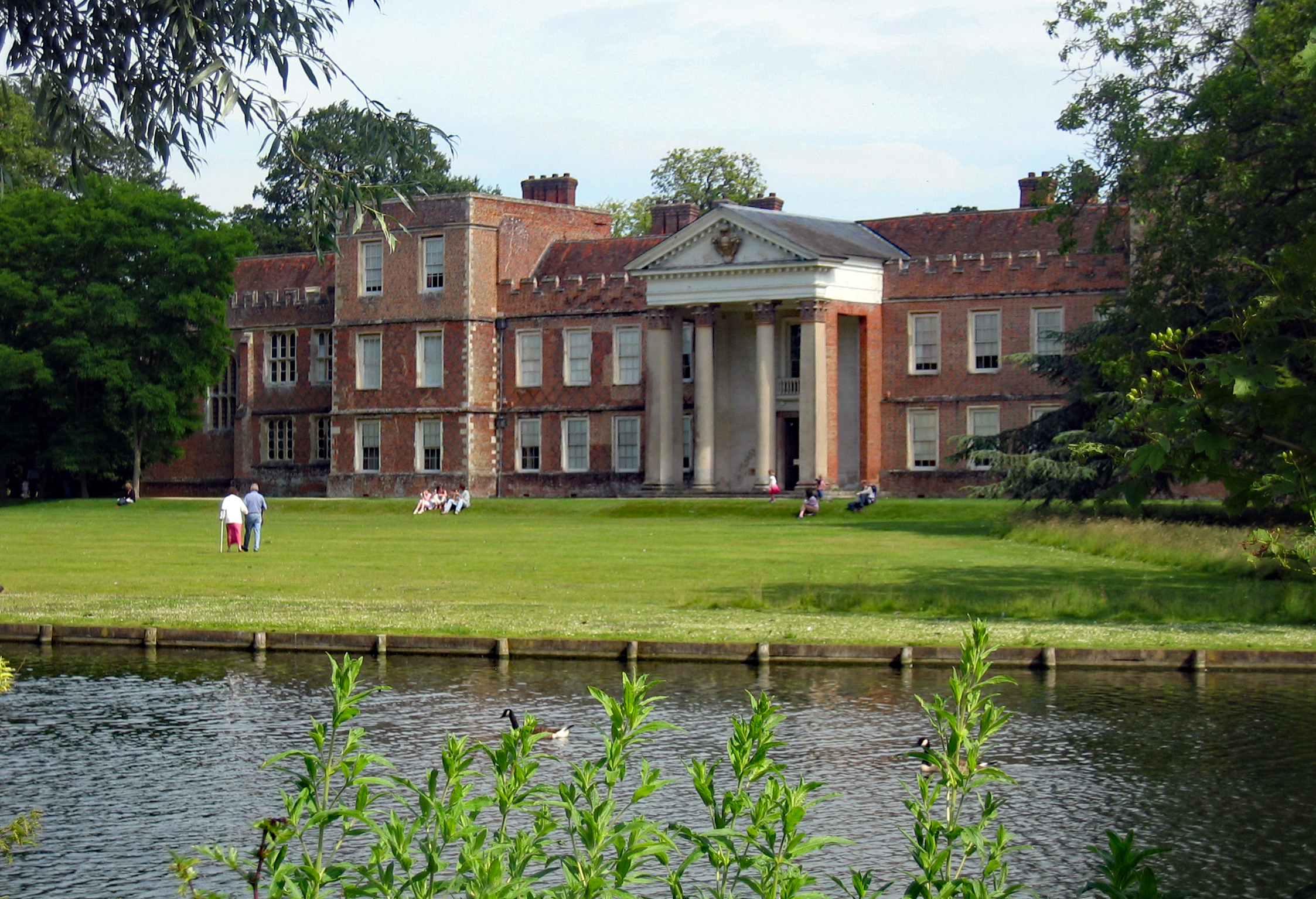
The Vyne

In 1924, Chute gave the advowson of the parish of Great Moulton, Norfolk, to Bertram Pollock, Bishop of Norwich, and his successors. In 1931, he remained patron of the parish of Sherborne St John.

In February 1925, Chute stated his occupation as farmer and his address as Popley Fields, Basingstoke, in travelling with his wife by a Dutch steamer from Algiers to Southampton. In the same year, he was first elected to Hampshire County Council and served as its chairman from 1938 to 1955. In May 1939, he was appointed as Chairman of the Quarter Sessions for Hampshire. In July 1952, in the 1952 Birthday Honours, a baronetcy, of The Vyne in the County of Southampton, was created for him, for public services in Hampshire. As he had no sons, it became extinct on his death four years later.

Chute died on 29 September 1956 at the Chest Hospital in Southampton, leaving an estate valued at £208,789, with his brother, the Ven. John Chaloner Chute, Archdeacon of Sherborne, as his Executor. He bequeathed The Vyne, his family home and estate, to the National Trust. At his death he still owned the advowson of Sherborne St John, and in 1957 his Executors gave it to the Bishop of Winchester.

John Chaloner Chute died in 1961, leaving an estate valued at £58,588. His Executor was Anthony Vere Chute, a pedigree pig breeder.

== Arms ==
Chute baronets
- Escutcheon of the Chute baronets of The Vyne
- Creation date: 1952
- Status: extinct
- Extinction date: 1956
- Motto: Fortune de guerre, Fortune of war

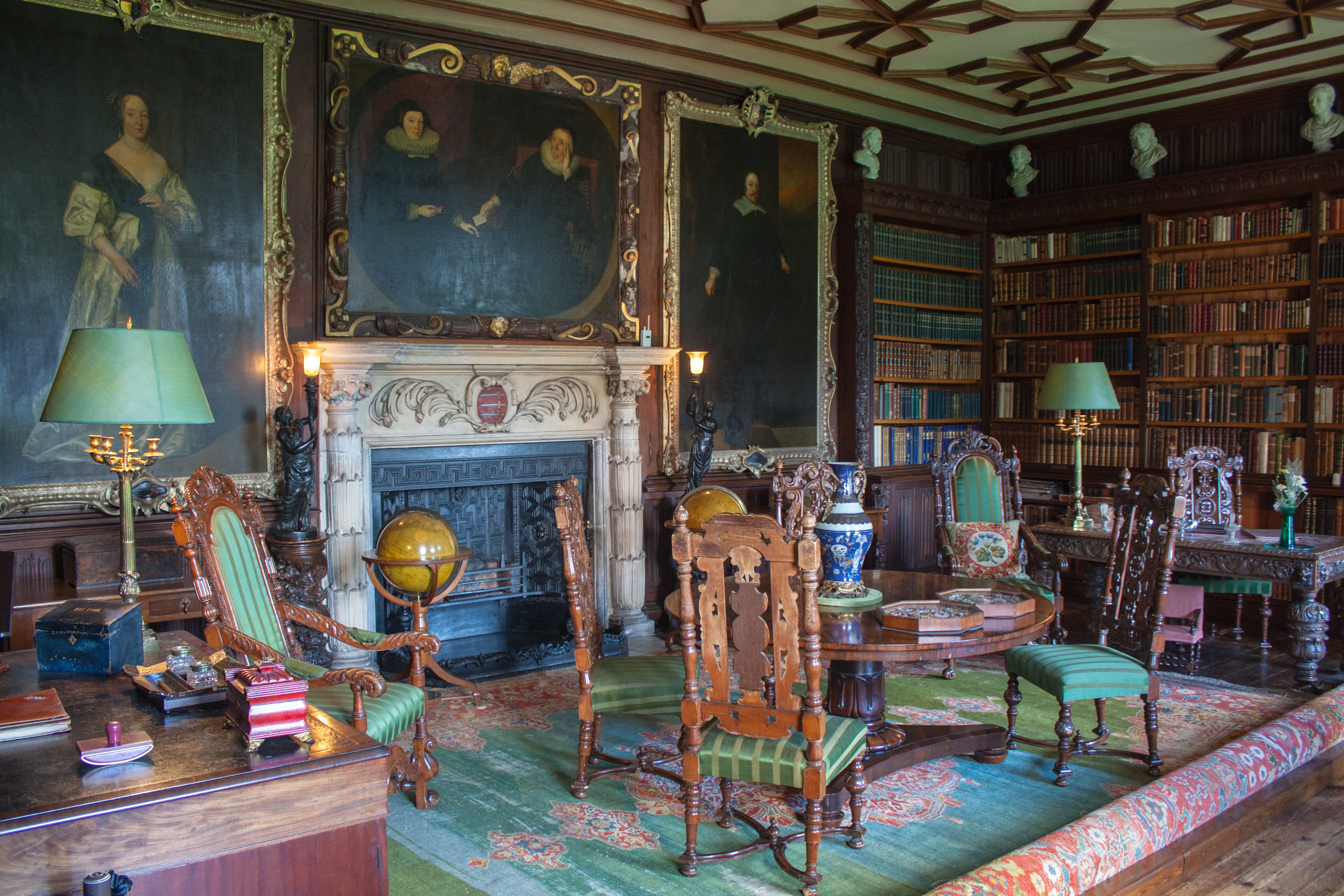
Chute arms on a chimneypiece in the library at the Vyne

Chute’s arms were blazoned

Quarterly 1st and 4th gules three swords barways the points towards the dexter proper pommels and hilts or and for distinction a canton ermine (Chute); 2nd and 3rd ermine three mullets 2 and 1 azure pierced gules on a chief wavy sable a dove regardant proper (Wiggett); and for crest a dexter cubit arm in armour, the hand gauntleted grasping a broken sword in bend sinister proper hilt and pommel or.

Baronetage of the United Kingdom
New creation	Baronet (of The Vyne); 1952–1956	Extinct
