= Jacob Astley, 16th Baron Hastings =

British peer and Whig politician (1797–1859)

Jacob Astley, 16th Baron Hastings (13 November 1797 – 27 December 1859), known as Sir Jacob Astley, Bt, between 1817 and 1841, was a British peer and Whig politician.

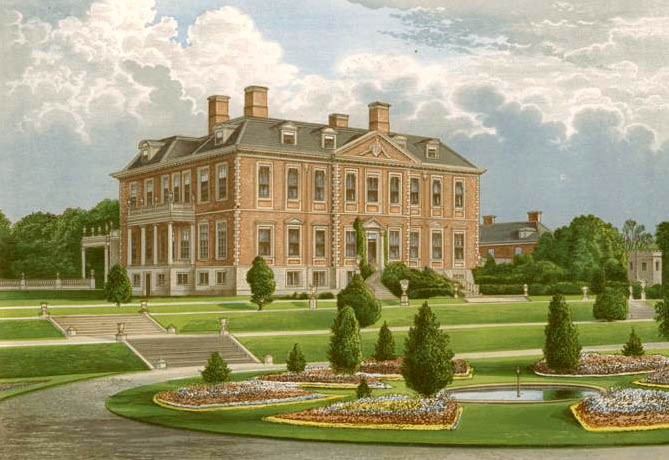
Melton Constable Hall, Norfolk

== Background and education ==
Hastings was the eldest son of Sir Jacob Astley, 5th Baronet, and Hester, daughter of Samuel Browne. He was educated at Magdalen College, Oxford. In 1817 he succeeded his father to the baronetcy and to the family seat of Melton Constable Hall in Norfolk.

== Political career ==
Hastings was High Sheriff of Norfolk between 1821 and 1822. In 1832 he was returned to Parliament for Norfolk West, a seat he held until 1837. In 1841 the House of Lords announced that Hastings was one of the co-heirs to the barony of Hastings, a peerage which had been dormant since 1389 and technically abeyant since 1542, as a descendant of Elizabeth, daughter of Hugh Hastings, de jure 14th Baron Hastings. At that time he lived in Melton Constable. Later the same year the abeyance was terminated in his favour and he was issued a writ to the House of Lords.

== Family ==
Lord Hastings, while still a baronet, married Georgiana Carolina, daughter of Sir Henry Dashwood, in 1819. They had two sons.

In 1835, Georgiana gave birth to a daughter, named Georgiana, fathered by Captain Thomas Garth of the 15th Hussars. She died in June of the same year, aged 39.

Lord Hastings died in December 1859, aged 62, and was succeeded by his eldest son, Jacob.

== Ancestry ==
Ancestors of Jacob Astley, 16th Baron Hastings

16. Sir Philip Astley, 2nd Baronet (1667–1739)
8. Sir Jacob Astley, 3rd Baronet
17. Elizabeth Bransby (d. 1738)
4. Sir Edward Astley, 4th Baronet
18. Sir Nicholas le Strange, 4th Baronet (1661–1724)
9. Lucy le Strange
19. Anne Wodehouse (d. 1727)
2. Sir Jacob Astley, 5th Baronet
20. Edward Delaval (1664–1744)
10. Capt. Francis Blake Delaval (1692–1752)
21. Mary Blake (d. 1711)
5. Rhoda Delaval
22. Robert Apreece (d. 1744)
11. Rhoda Apreece (1701–1759)
23. Sarah Hussey (1672–1749)
1. Jacob Astley, 16th Baron Hastings
24.
12.
25.
6. Samuel Browne
26.
13.
27.
3. Hester Browne
28.
14.
29.
7.
30.
15.
31.

Parliament of the United Kingdom
New constituency	Member of Parliament for Norfolk West; 1832–1837; With: Sir William Ffolkes, Bt	Succeeded by William Bagge; William Lyde Wiggett Chute
Honorary titles
Preceded by George Samuel Kett	High Sheriff of Norfolk; 1821	Succeeded by Sir Richard Jodrell, Bt
Baronetage of England
Preceded by Jacob Henry Astley	Baronet (of Hill Morton); 1817–1859	Succeeded by Jacob Henry Delaval Astley
Peerage of England
Preceded by Abeyant since 1542	Baron Hastings; 1841–1859	Succeeded by Jacob Henry Delaval Astley
