= Thomas de Grey, 6th Baron Walsingham =

English politician and entomologist (1843–1919)

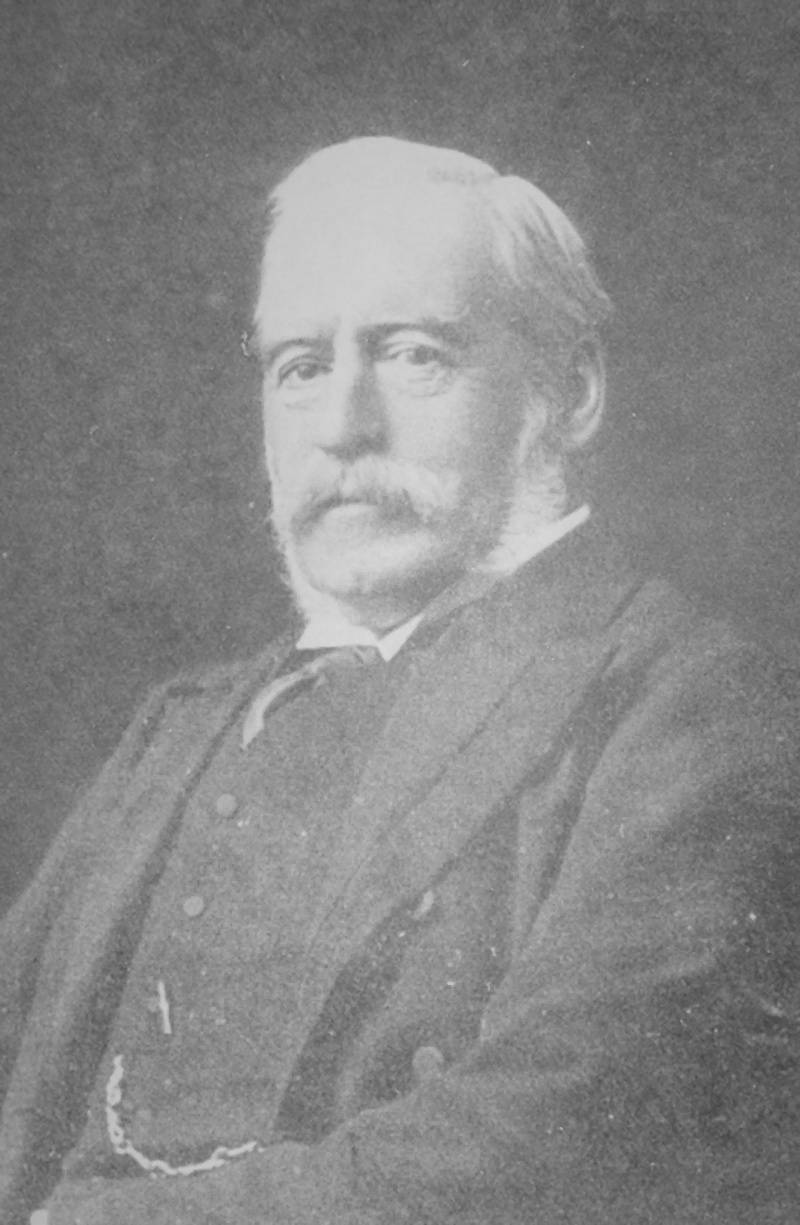

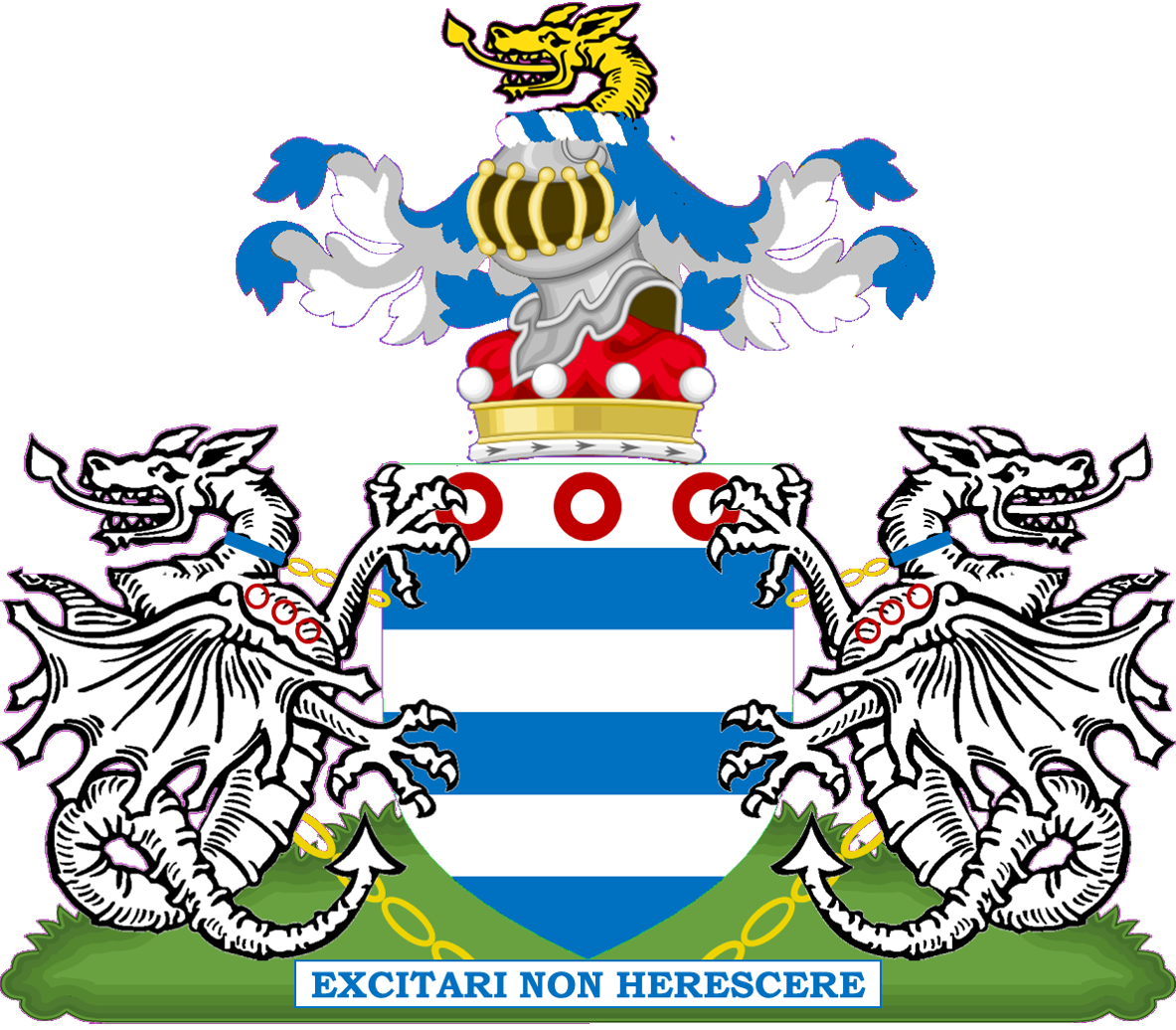
Arms of Grey, Barons Walsingham: Barry of six argent and azure, in chief three annulets gules; crest: A wyvern's head or; supporters: Two wyverns regardant argent collard azure chained or and charged on the breast with three annulets gules; motto: Excitari Non Herescere ("to be spirited not inactive")

Thomas de Grey, 6th Baron Walsingham (29 July 1843 – 3 December 1919), of Merton Hall, Norfolk, was an English politician and amateur entomologist.

== Family business ==
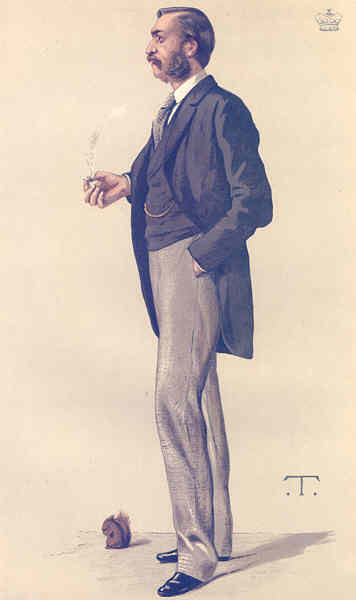
"a Naturalist" Lord Walsingham as caricatured by T in Vanity Fair, 9 September 1882.

Walsingham was the son of Thomas de Grey, 5th Baron Walsingham, and Augusta-Louisa, daughter of Sir Robert Frankland-Russell, 7th Baronet. He was born on Stanhope Street in Mayfair, the family's London house. He was educated at Eton and Trinity College, Cambridge. He sat as Conservative Member of Parliament for West Norfolk from 1865 until 1870, when he succeeded to the title and estates of his father, and entered the House of Lords. From 1874 to 1875 he served as a Lord-in-waiting (government whip) in the second Conservative government of Benjamin Disraeli. From 1870 on he also ran the family's estate at Merton, Norfolk, served as trustee of the British Museum and performed many other public functions.

== Lepidoptery ==
Walsingham was a keen lepidopterist, collecting butterflies and moths from a young age, and particularly interested in Microlepidoptera. His collection was one of the most important ever made, which after his purchase of the Zeller, Hofmann and Christoph collections contained over 260,000 specimens. He donated it to the Natural History Museum, along with his library of 2,600 books.

Walsingham was elected a fellow of the Royal Society in 1887, and was a member of the Entomological Society of London, serving as president on two occasions. He married three times, but left no heir, and was succeeded as Baron by his half-brother. He married his third wife, the widow Agnes Dawson née Hemming, in 1914. Her daughter was Margaret Damer Dawson.

== Grouse shooting ==
On 30 August 1888, Walsingham had a remarkable day shooting on Blubberhouses Moor, Yorkshire, when he killed 1,070 grouse. The day started at 05:12 with the first of twenty drives, assisted by two teams of forty beaters, two loaders and four guns. During the sixteenth drive he shot 94 grouse in 21 minutes; a killing rate of one every 13 seconds. The last drive finished at 18:45, and he shot 14 on the walk home.

== Cricket ==
Walsingham was a cricketer from 1862 to 1866. Recorded on scorecards as T de Grey, he played in 15 matches, totalling 380 runs with a highest score of 62 and holding 9 catches. He was mainly associated with Marylebone Cricket Club (MCC) and Cambridge University, also representing the Gentlemen in a Gentlemen v Players match in 1863, and played for I Zingari at Sandringham on 17–18 July 1866 (at which the Prince of Wales opened for the team).

Parliament of the United Kingdom
Preceded by Brampton Gurdon; George Bentinck	Member of Parliament for West Norfolk; 1865–1870; With: Sir William Bagge	Succeeded by Sir William Bagge; George Bentinck
Political offices
Preceded by The Lord Wrottesley	Lord-in-waiting; 1874–1875	Succeeded by The Earl of Jersey
Peerage of Great Britain
Preceded by Thomas de Grey	Baron Walsingham; 1870–1919	Succeeded by John Augustus de Grey
