= Georgiana Astley =

English socialite (1796–1835)

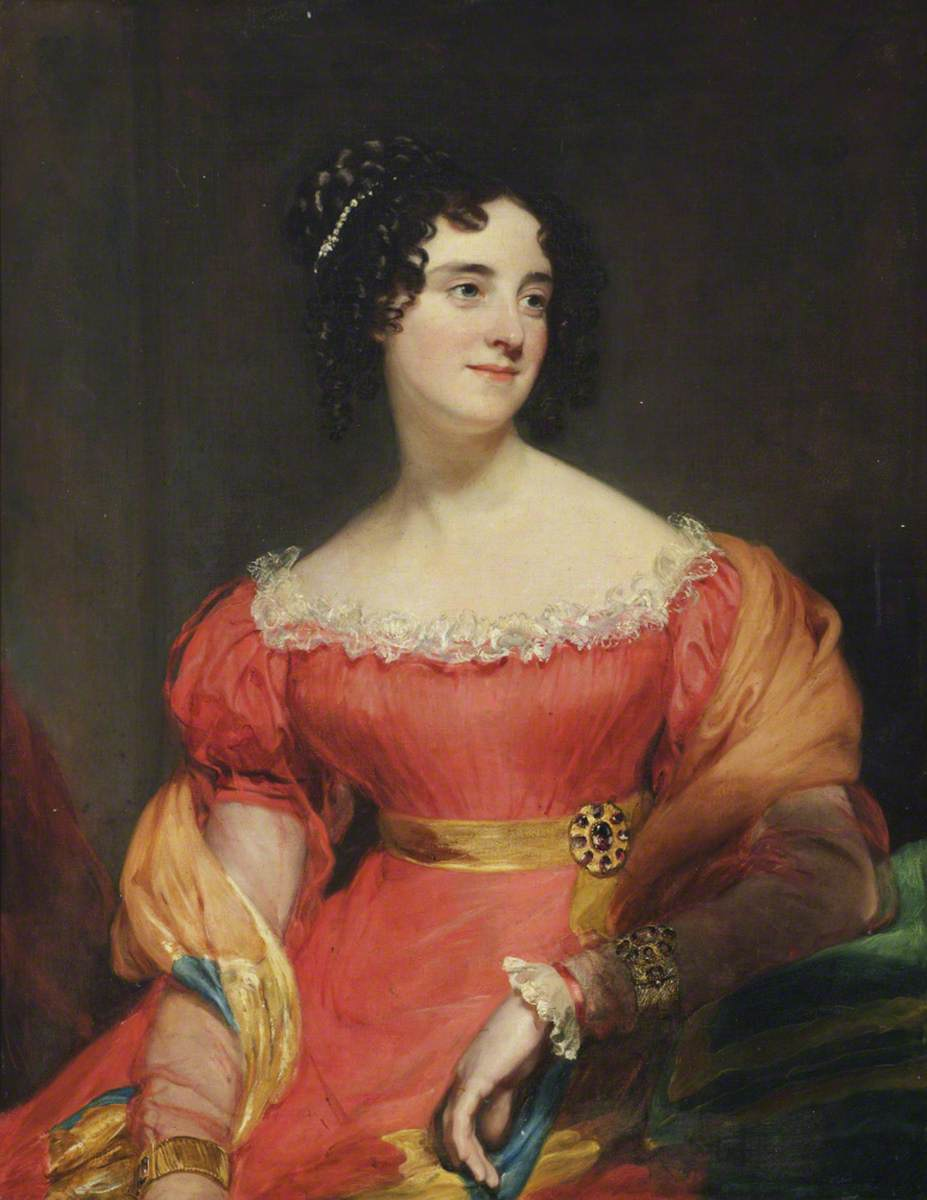
Georgiana Dashwood

Georgiana Carolina, Lady Astley (née Dashwood; 16 March 1796 – 28 June 1835) was an English socialite.

Georgiana was the daughter of MP Sir Henry Dashwood, and his wife, Helen Graham. She was baptised at the fashionable St George's, Hanover Square, in Mayfair.

She married Sir Jacob Astley, Bt in 1819 and had two sons. On 24 June 1829, she eloped with Captain Thomas Garth of the 15th Hussars, the son of General Thomas Garth, a chief equerry to King George III. Her husband filed a divorce suit against her for adultery. In court, she accused her husband of having "improper familiarities and adultery with abandoned women". It was later proved by the court and Lady Astley was dismissed from the suit.

However, the couple did not reconcile and Lady Astley went to live with Captain Garth. In October 1830, Garth was committed for debt to the King's Bench Prison, Southwark and Lady Astley lived there with him. In 1835, she gave birth to an illegitimate daughter, Georgiana. Soon after the confinement, she caught scarlet fever and died at the age of 39.
