= West Norfolk (constituency) =

Parliamentary constituency in the United Kingdom, 1832–1885

- Former county constituency for the House of Commons
- Context of 1832-1868. Extract from 1837 result: the northern 'doubly' blue land by the great bay (bight), the Wash.

1832–1885
- Seats: two
- Replaced by: Mid Norfolk; North West Norfolk; South West Norfolk

West Norfolk or Norfolk Western (formally the "Western division of Norfolk") was a county constituency in the county of Norfolk, which returned two Members of Parliament (MPs) to the House of Commons of the Parliament of the United Kingdom, elected by the bloc vote system.

The constituency was created by the Reform Act 1832 for the 1832 general election, alongside Eastern Norfolk, as one of two Divisions of the Parliamentary County of Norfolk, each returning 2 MPs. It was abolished under the Redistribution of Seats Act 1885 for the 1885 general election.

== Boundaries and boundary changes ==
=== 1832–1868 ===
- The Hundreds of Freebridge Marshland, Smithdon, Freebridge Lynn, Clackclose, Brothercross, Gallow, Holt, Launditch, South Greenhoe, Grimshoe, North Greenhoe, Wayland, Shropham, Gilt Cross and Mitford.

=== 1868–1885 ===
- The Hundreds of Wayland, Launditch, South Greenhoe, Gallow, Brothercross, Smithdon, Freebridge Lynn, Freebridge Marshland, Clackclose and Grimshoe.

Small parts of the division were transferred to the newly formed North and South Divisions of Norfolk. Also absorbed the disenfranchised Parliamentary Borough of Thetford.

On abolition in 1885, northern areas formed the new North-Western Division of Norfolk, southern areas formed the new South-Western Division and central areas were included in the new Mid Division.

== Members of Parliament ==
| Election | 1st Member | 1st Party | 2nd Member | 2nd Party |
|---|---|---|---|---|
| 1832 | Sir William Ffolkes, Bt | Whig | Sir Jacob Astley, Bt | Whig |
| 1837 | William Bagge | Conservative | William Chute | Conservative |
| 1847 | William Bagge | Conservative | Hon. Edward Coke | Whig |
| 1852 | William Bagge | Conservative | George Bentinck | Conservative |
| 1857 | Brampton Gurdon | Whig | George Bentinck | Conservative |
| 1859 | Brampton Gurdon | Liberal | George Bentinck | Conservative |
| 1865 | William Bagge | Conservative | Hon. Thomas de Grey | Conservative |
| 1871 by-election | William Bagge | Conservative | George Bentinck | Conservative |
| 1880 by-election | William Tyssen-Amherst | Conservative | George Bentinck | Conservative |
| 1884 by-election | William Tyssen-Amherst | Conservative | Clare Sewell Read | Conservative |
| 1885 | representation reduced to one member and constituency abolished | | | |

== Election results ==
=== Elections in the 1830s ===
General election 1832: West Norfolk
| Party | Candidate | Votes | % |
|---|---|---|---|
| Whig | William ffolkes | Unopposed | |
| Whig | Jacob Astley | Unopposed | |
| Registered electors | | 4,396 | |
| Whig win (new seat) | | | |
| Whig win (new seat) | | | |

General election 1835: West Norfolk
| Party | Candidate | Votes | % |
|---|---|---|---|
| Whig | William ffolkes | 2,299 | 36.4 |
| Whig | Jacob Astley | 2,134 | 33.8 |
| Conservative | William Bagge | 1,880 | 29.8 |
| Majority | | 254 | 4.0 |
| Turnout | | 3,947 | 85.2 |
| Registered electors | | 4,633 | |
| Whig hold | | | |
| Whig hold | | | |

General election 1837: West Norfolk
| Party | Candidate | Votes | % | ±% |
|---|---|---|---|---|
| Conservative | William Bagge | 3,178 | 27.4 | +12.5 |
| Conservative | William Lyde Wiggett Chute | 2,877 | 24.8 | +9.9 |
| Whig | William ffolkes | 2,838 | 24.5 | −11.9 |
| Whig | Jacob Astley | 2,713 | 23.4 | −10.4 |
| Majority | | 465 | 4.0 | N/A |
| Majority | | 39 | 0.3 | N/A |
| Turnout | | 5,898 | 81.3 | −3.9 |
| Registered electors | | 7,258 | | |
| Conservative gain from Whig | | Swing | +11.8 | |
| Conservative gain from Whig | | Swing | +10.5 | |

=== Elections in the 1840s ===
General election 1841: West Norfolk
| Party | Candidate | Votes | % | ±% |
|---|---|---|---|---|
| Conservative | William Bagge | Unopposed | | |
| Conservative | William Lyde Wiggett Chute | Unopposed | | |
| Registered electors | | 7,559 | | |
| Conservative hold | | | | |
| Conservative hold | | | | |

11776

General election 1847: West Norfolk
| Party | Candidate | Votes | % | ±% |
|---|---|---|---|---|
| Conservative | William Bagge | 3,113 | 26.4 | N/A |
| Whig | Edward Coke | 3,052 | 25.9 | New |
| Whig | Anthony Hamond, Sr. | 2,935 | 24.9 | New |
| Conservative | Henry L'Estrange Styleman Le Strange | 2,676 | 22.7 | N/A |
| Turnout | | 5,888 (est) | 78.3 (est) | N/A |
| Registered electors | | 7,516 | | |
| Majority | | 61 | 0.5 | N/A |
| Conservative hold | | Swing | N/A | |
| Majority | | 376 | 3.2 | N/A |
| Whig gain from Conservative | | Swing | N/A | |

=== Elections in the 1850s ===
General election 1852: West Norfolk
| Party | Candidate | Votes | % | ±% |
|---|---|---|---|---|
| Conservative | William Bagge | 3,421 | 40.1 | +13.7 |
| Conservative | George Bentinck | 3,143 | 36.8 | +14.1 |
| Whig | Anthony Hamond, Sr. | 1,973 | 23.1 | −27.7 |
| Majority | | 1,170 | 13.7 | N/A |
| Turnout | | 5,255 (est) | 67.1 (est) | −11.2 |
| Registered electors | | 7,827 | | |
| Conservative hold | | Swing | +13.8 | |
| Conservative gain from Whig | | Swing | +14.0 | |

General election 1857: West Norfolk
| Party | Candidate | Votes | % | ±% |
|---|---|---|---|---|
| Conservative | George Bentinck | Unopposed | | |
| Whig | Brampton Gurdon | Unopposed | | |
| Registered electors | | 7,179 | | |
| Conservative hold | | | | |
| Whig gain from Conservative | | | | |

General election 1859: West Norfolk
| Party | Candidate | Votes | % | ±% |
|---|---|---|---|---|
| Conservative | George Bentinck | Unopposed | | |
| Liberal | Brampton Gurdon | Unopposed | | |
| Registered electors | | 6,941 | | |
| Conservative hold | | | | |
| Liberal hold | | | | |

=== Elections in the 1860s ===
General election 1865: West Norfolk
| Party | Candidate | Votes | % | ±% |
|---|---|---|---|---|
| Conservative | William Bagge | 2,710 | 28.4 | N/A |
| Conservative | Thomas de Grey | 2,611 | 27.4 | N/A |
| Liberal | Willoughby Jones | 2,133 | 22.4 | N/A |
| Liberal | Brampton Gurdon | 2,088 | 21.9 | N/A |
| Majority | | 622 | 6.5 | N/A |
| Majority | | 478 | 5.0 | N/A |
| Turnout | | 4,771 (est) | 73.0 (est) | N/A |
| Registered electors | | 6,534 | | |
| Conservative hold | | | | |
| Conservative gain from Liberal | | | | |

General election 1868: West Norfolk
| Party | Candidate | Votes | % | ±% |
|---|---|---|---|---|
| Conservative | Thomas de Grey | Unopposed | | |
| Conservative | William Bagge | Unopposed | | |
| Registered electors | | 7,062 | | |
| Conservative hold | | | | |
| Conservative hold | | | | |

=== Elections in the 1870s ===
Grey succeeded to the peerage, becoming Lord Walsingham.

By-election, 8 Feb 1871: West Norfolk
| Party | Candidate | Votes | % | ±% |
|---|---|---|---|---|
| Conservative | George Bentinck | Unopposed | | |
| Conservative hold | | | | |

General election 1874: West Norfolk
| Party | Candidate | Votes | % | ±% |
|---|---|---|---|---|
| Conservative | George Bentinck | Unopposed | | |
| Conservative | William Bagge | Unopposed | | |
| Registered electors | | 6,647 | | |
| Conservative hold | | | | |
| Conservative hold | | | | |

=== Elections in the 1880s ===
Bagge's death caused a by-election.

By-election, 8 Mar 1880: West Norfolk
| Party | Candidate | Votes | % | ±% |
|---|---|---|---|---|
| Conservative | William Tyssen-Amherst | Unopposed | | |
| Conservative hold | | | | |

General election 1880: West Norfolk
| Party | Candidate | Votes | % | ±% |
|---|---|---|---|---|
| Conservative | William Tyssen-Amherst | 2,671 | 38.1 | N/A |
| Conservative | George Bentinck | 2,233 | 31.9 | N/A |
| Liberal | Anthony Hamond (jun) | 2,104 | 30.0 | New |
| Majority | | 129 | 1.9 | N/A |
| Turnout | | 4,556 (est) | 70.4 (est) | N/A |
| Registered electors | | 6,471 | | |
| Conservative hold | | Swing | | |
| Conservative hold | | Swing | | |

Bentinck's resignation caused a by-election.

By-election, 21 Feb 1884: West Norfolk
| Party | Candidate | Votes | % | ±% |
|---|---|---|---|---|
| Conservative | Clare Sewell Read | Unopposed | | |
| Conservative hold | | | | |

== Sources ==
- Leigh Rayment's Historical List of MPs – Constituencies beginning with "N" (part 2)
