= Thomas Bagge =

English cricketer

Personal information
- Born: 30 April 1838; Gaywood Hall, Norfolk
- Died: 23 October 1908 (aged 70); Gaywood Hall, Norfolk
- Source: Cricinfo, 1 April 2017

Thomas Bagge (30 April 1838 – 23 October 1908) was an English cricketer. He played thirteen first-class matches for Cambridge University Cricket Club between 1859 and 1862.

== See also ==
- List of Cambridge University Cricket Club players
