= Aslacton =

Village in Norfolk, England

Coordinates: 52.475°N 1.175°E

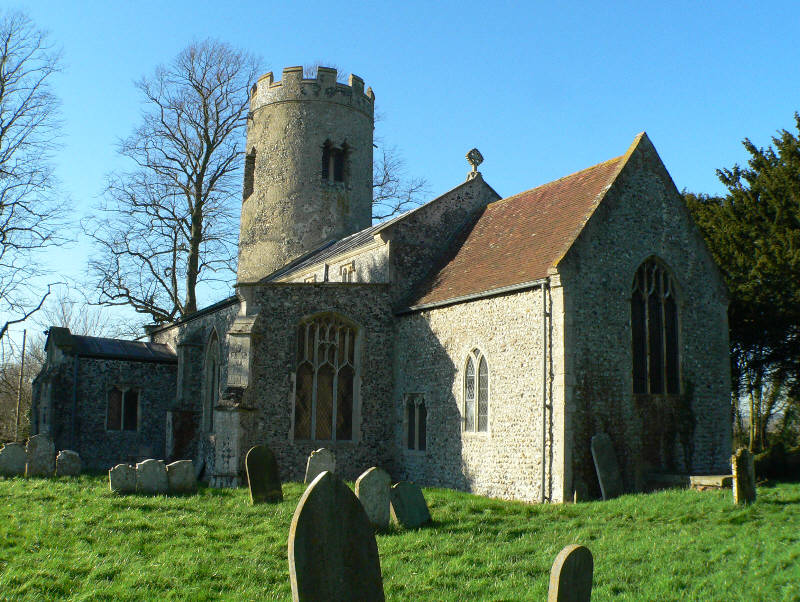
- Aslacton St Michael

- Location within Norfolk
- Area: 4.88 km^{2} (1.88 sq mi)
- Population: 434 (2011)
  - Density: 89/km^{2} (230/sq mi)
- OS grid reference: TM156911
- Civil parish: Aslacton
- District: South Norfolk
- Shire county: Norfolk
- Region: East
- Country: England
- Sovereign state: United Kingdom
- Post town: NORWICH
- Postcode district: NR15
- Dialling code: 01379
- Police: Norfolk
- Fire: Norfolk
- Ambulance: East of England
- UK Parliament: South Norfolk
- Website: http://aslactonpc.wixsite.com/aslactonpc

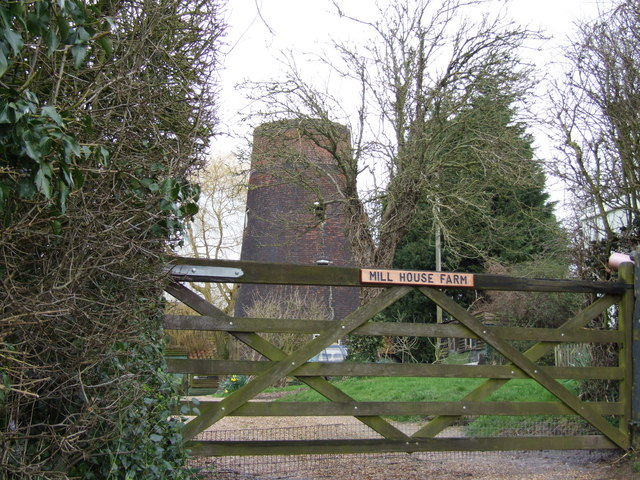
Aslacton Mill

Aslacton is a village and civil parish in the English county of Norfolk. It is situated between Norwich and Diss, and is near Great Moulton. The closest town to Aslacton is Long Stratton.

The village name means 'Aslakr's farm/settlement'.

The civil parish has an area of 4.88 square kilometres (1.88 sq mi) and in the 2001 census had a population of 416 in 161 households, the population increasing to 434 at the 2011 census, and to 445 at the 2021 census. For the purposes of local government, the parish falls within the district of South Norfolk.

Its church, dating from 996AD, St Michael is one of 124 existing round-tower churches in Norfolk.

Aslacton has a primary school.

== See also ==
- Aslacton Windmill
