= Tivetshall St Margaret =

Village in Norfolk, England

Coordinates: 52.436967°N 1.181717°E

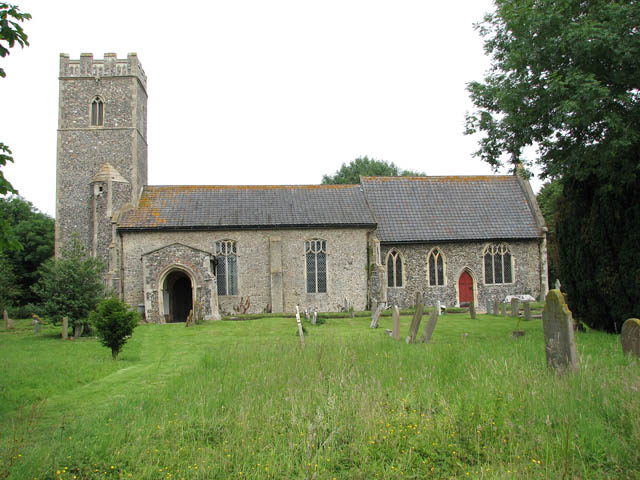
- St Margaret's church

- Location within Norfolk
- Area: 6.90 km^{2} (2.66 sq mi)
- Population: 295 (2011)
  - Density: 43/km^{2} (110/sq mi)
- OS grid reference: TM163869
- Civil parish: Tivetshall
- District: South Norfolk
- Shire county: Norfolk
- Region: East
- Country: England
- Sovereign state: United Kingdom
- Post town: NORWICH
- Postcode district: NR15
- Dialling code: 01379
- Police: Norfolk
- Fire: Norfolk
- Ambulance: East of England
- UK Parliament: Waveney Valley

Tivetshall St Margaret is a village and former civil parish, now in the parish of Tivetshall, in the South Norfolk district, in the county of Norfolk, England. It covered an area of 1,700 acres (690 ha) and had a population of 266 in 104 households at the 2001 census, increasing to 295 at the 2011 Census. On 1 April 2019 the parish was merged with Tivetshall St Mary to form Tivetshall.

The villages name means 'Nook of land'. It has been suggested that the first element may be related to a late northern English dialectical, 'tewhit' meaning 'lapwing'. 'St. Margaret' from the church dedication.

== The church ==
The church of St. Margaret has a tympanum painted with the Royal Arms of Elizabeth I, among the earliest in England, dating from 1587. The huge arms, which stretch across the church, from wall to wall and from the top of the roodscreen to the roof, are flanked by the lion and the dragon. Beneath is painted "God Save Our Quene Elizabeth". Symbols of the other four Tudor monarchs, and the badge of Anne Boleyn, Elizabeth's mother, are also shown. Beneath the arms, which have been recently restored, are the Ten Commandments.

== See also ==
- Tivetshall railway station
