= 1880 West Norfolk by-election =

UK Parliamentary by-election

The 1880 West Norfolk by-election was contested on 8 March 1880. The by-election, which occurred in 1880, was fought due to the passing of the incumbent Conservative MP, Sir William Bagge. It was won by the unopposed Conservative candidate William Tyssen-Amherst.
