= High Sheriff of Norfolk =

Ceremonial officer of the English county of Norfolk

The high sheriff is the oldest secular office under the Crown and is appointed annually (in March) by the Crown. The High Sheriff of Norfolk was originally the principal law enforcement officer in Norfolk and presided at the assizes and other important county meetings. Most of the responsibilities associated with the post have been transferred elsewhere or are now defunct, so that its functions are now largely ceremonial. There was a single high sheriff serving the two counties of Norfolk and Suffolk until 1576.

== Pre 17th century ==
- 1575 Thomas Townsend of Rainham
- 1576 Drugo Drury, of Riddlesworth.
- 1577 Sir Henry Weston, Kt
- 1578 Bassingbourn Gawdy of West Harling
- 1579 Thomas Knyvet, 1st Baron Knyvet of Ashwellthorpe
- 1580 Sir Edward Clere of Blickling
- 1581 Arthur Heveningham, of Ketteringham
- 1582 Sir William Paston, of Faston, Kt
- 1583 Sir William Heydon, of Baconsthorpe, Kt
- 1584 Sir Henry Woodhouse, of Waxham, Kt
- 1585 Thomas Hogan of East Bradenham, died then replaced by Henry Hogan, of Great Dunham.
- 1586 Nathaniel Bacon of Stiffkey
- 1587 Clement Paston of Oxnead
- 1588 Sir John Peyton, of Isleham, Cambridgeshire
- 1589 Sir Robert Southwell of Wood Rising
- 1590 Henry D'Oyley, of Shottisham.
- 1591 Sir Miles Corbet, of Sprowston
- 1592 Henry Gawdy of Claxton
- 1593 Sir Bassingbourn Gawdy, of West Harling
- 1594 Sir Philip Wodehouse, 1st Baronet of Kimberley
- 1595 Thomas Clere, of Stokesby
- 1596 Humphrey Guybon, of Thursford
- 1597 Sir Nicholas Bacon, of Redgrave, Suffolk, Kt
- 1598 Sir Clement Spelman, of Narburgh, Kt
- 1599 Nathaniel Bacon of Stiffkey
- 1600: Richard Jenkinson, of Tunstall

== 17th century ==
- 1601: Sir Bassingbourne Gawdy, of West Harling
- 1602: Arthur Heveningham, of Ketteringham.
- 1603: Arthur Heveningham, of Ketteringham
- 1604: Edmund D'Oyley, of Shottisham
- 1605: Sir Henry Spelman of Congham
- 1606: Sir Ralph Hare of Stow Bardolph
- 1607: L'Estrange Mordaunt, of Little Massingham.
- 1608: Sir Henry Gawdy of Claxton
- 1609: Sir Hamon L'Estrange of Hunstanton
- 1610: Sir Thomas Berney of Reedham
- 1611: Sir Clippesby Gawdy of Crowshall
- 1612: Sir Thomas Corbet of Sprowston
- 1613: Sir Thomas Hewar, of Emneth
- 1614: Sir James Calthorpe of Cockthorpe
- 1615: Sir John Heveningham of Ketteringham
- 1616: Richard Jenkinson, of Tunstall
- 1617: Sir Augustine Palgrave, North Barningham
- 1618: Sir Anthony Drury of Besthorpe
- 1619: Sir Thomas Holland of Quidenham
- 1620: Sir Henry Bedingfield of Oxburgh
- 1621: Sir Thomas Hyrne of Haveringland
- 1622: Sir William Yelverton, of Rougham, Bt
- 1623: Sir Richard Berney, 1st Baronet of Parkhall
- 1624: Sir Lestrange Mordaunt, 1st Baronet of Little Massingham
- 1625: Sir Thomas Wodehouse of Kimberley
- 1626: Thomas Holl, of Heigham, near Norwich
- 1627: Sir Charles Le Gross of Crostwight Hall
- 1628: Framlingham Gawdy of West Harling
- 1629: Sir Robert Gawdy of Claxton
- 1630: Sir Roger Townshend, 1st Baronet of Raynham Hall
- 1631: Francis Mapes, of Rollesby
- 1632: Thomas Pettus, of Rackheath.
- 1633: Sir John Hobart, of Blickling Hall
- 1634: William Heveningham of Ketteringham
- 1635: Sir John Wentworth, of Somerleyton, Suffolk, Kt
- 1636: Sir Edward Barkham, 1st Baronet of South Acre Hall
- 1637: William Paston, of Oxnead
- 1638: Sir Francis Astley of Melton Constable (deceased) then John Buxton of Earsham
- 1639: Augustine Holl of Heigham.
- 1640: Thomas Windham, of Felbrigg
- 1641: Robert Longe, of Reymerstone
- 1642: Sir Thomas Guybon, of Tharsford, Kt
- 1643: James Calthorpe of East Barsham
- 1644: John Coke, of Godwick
- 1645: Sir Valentine Pell, of Dersingbam, Kt
- 1646: Sir Isaac Astley, of Melton Constable, Bt
- 1647: Thomas Bemey, of Swardestoe.
- 1648: Humphrey Rant
- 1648: William Coke, of Grodwick.
- 1649: Gregory Gawsell, of Watlington
- 1650: Hugh Audley, of Old Buckenham.
- 1651: Sir Ralph Hare, 1st Baronet of Stow Bardolph
- 1652: Cbarles Gameys, of Boyland Hall, Morningtborpe
- 1653: Thomas Wright, of Kilverstone Hall, (deceased) then Sir Edward Astley, of Melton Constable, Kt
- 1654: Erasmus or John Earle of Heydon.
- 1655: Sir Arthur Jensey, of Knobhall, Suffolk, Kt
- 1656: Edward Ward, of Bixley
- 1657: Edward Ward, of Bixley
- 1658: John Sedley, of Morley.
- 1660: Sir John Cremer of Ingoldsthorpe, Kt
- 1661: Robert Suckling, of Woodton
- 1662: Richard Berney, of Reedham
- 1663: Sir Thomas Meadowe, of Great Yarmouth. Kt
- 1664: Sir Jacob Astley, 1st Baronet of Melton Constable, Bt
- 1665: Sir Thomas Pettus, 2nd Baronet of Rackheath
- 12 November 1665: Sir John Hobart, 3rd Baronet, of Blickling Hall
- 7 November 1666: Hatton Berners, of Wiggenhall St Mary Magdalen
- 6 November 1667: William Harvey
- 15 November 1667: Sir Edward Barkham, 2nd Baronet, of Westacre
- 6 November 1668: George Ingland
- 25 November 1668: Sir George Vyner, 2nd Baronet, of London
- 11 November 1669: Richard Berney
- 4 November 1670: Robert Coney, of Walpole St. Peter
- 9 November 1671: John Mann, of Norwich
- 11 November 1672: Sir William Adams, 2nd Baronet, of Sprowston
- 12 November 1673: Richard Norwich (accounts rendered for the year by Thomas Bishop, of Ipswich, Suffolk)
- 5 November 1674: Richard Norwich
- 11 November 1674: Rowland Dee
- 12 November 1674: Henry Reeve
- 1674: Elisha Phillippe, of Norwich
- 15 November 1675: John Pell, of Darsington
- 1676: Robert Coke of Thorington, Suffolk and Holkham, Norfolk
- 10 November 1676: Christopher Layer, of Booton
- 15 November 1677: Thomas Pierson, of Linne
- 14 November 1678: John Jay, of Holveston
- 13 November 1679: Philip Harbord, of Stanninghall
- 4 November 1680: John Green, of Braddenham
- 1681: Thomas Bfnasby?, of Shottisham.
- 1682: John Knyvet, of Ashwelthorpe
- 1663: John Oreen, of Wilby
- 1684: Henry Shelton, of Shelton.
- 1685: Sir Francis Guybon of Thursford Hall
- 1686: Sir Robert Nightingall of North Barlingham
- 1687: John Harbord, of Gunton
- 1688: Thomas Seaman, of Heigham, near Norwich.
- 1689: John Heme, of Arminghall
- 1690: Erasmus Earle, of Heydon
- 1691: Sir Augustine Palgrave, of North Barningham, Bt
- 1692: Richard Berney, of Reedham
- 1693: John Burkin, of North Burlingham
- 1694: Sir Charles Adams, of Sprowston, Bt
- 1695: Francis Windham, of Cromer
- 1696: Sir James Edwards, of Reedham, Bt
- 1697: Robert Doughty, of Hanworth
- 1698: Richard Mason, of Necton
- 1699: Matthew Long, of Danston

== 18th century ==
- 1700 Edward Lombe of Westoo
- 1701 Robert Suckling, of Woodton
- 1702 William Newman, of Baconsthorpe
- 1703 Roger Crowe, of Norwich
- 1704 Richard Knight, of Attlebridge
- 1705 James Hoste, of Sandringham
- 1706 Richard Dashwood, of Cockley Cley
- 1707 Beaupre Bell, of Outwell
- 1708 Henry Framingham, of Burnham
- 1709 Henry Heron, of Ketteringham
- 1710 Sir Peter Seaman, Kt. of Norwich
- 1711 John Fowle, of Broome
- 1712 James Harcourt, of Carleton by Norwich
- 1713 Thomas Wright, of East Harling
- 1714 Edward Lombe, of Great Mellon
- 1715 Thomas Durrant, of Scottow
- 1716 Thomas Rogers, of Dersingham, died and succeeded by Thomas Rogers, jnr. of Dersingham,
- 1717 William Berners, of Lynn Regis
- 1718 John Howes, of Morningthorpe
- 1719 John Colman, of Broome
- 1720 Peter Elwin, of Tottington
- 1721 Nathaniel Life, of Swaffham
- 1722 William Rootley, of West Barsham
- 1723 Gresham Page, of Saxthorpe
- 1724 Robert Clough, of Feltwell
- 1725 Richard Whitaker, of Matlask
- 1726 Rice Wiggett, of Guestwick
- 1727 Roger Pratt, of West Ruston
- 1728 John Bedingfield, of Beeston St. Andrew
- 1729 Cyril Wych, of Hockwold cum Wilton
- 1730 Richard Tubby, of Brockdish
- 1731 Thomas Cooper, of North Walsham
- 1732 John Wilson, of Stanhoe
- 1733 William Helwys, of Morton
- 1734 Edwin Coney, Houghton by Walsingham
- 1735 George Smith, Topcroft
- 1736 William Henry Fleming, of Watton
- 1737 Peter Rosier, of Pulham
- 1738 Thomas Bell, of Oulton
- 1739 John Parr, of Salthouse
- 1740 Henry Negus, of Hoveton St. Peter
- 1741 James Mackarel, of Ringland
- 1742 John Thurston, Barwick
- 1743 Edward Atkyns, of Ketteringham
- 1744 Peter Barret, of Horstead
- 1745 Barry Love, of Ormesby
- 1746 Sir Horatio Pettus, Bt. of Rackheath
- 1747 Charles Cooper Morley, of East Barsham
- 1748 William Jermy, of Bayfield
- 1749 Thomas Sotherton, of Taverham
- 1750 Leonard Mapes, of Rollesby
- 1751 Robert Knopwood, of Threxton
- 1752 Francis Longe, of Spixworth
- 1753 Hamilton Custance, of Weston
- 1754 Cotton Symonds, of Ormesby
- 1755 Miles Branthwayt, of Attlebridge
- 1756 John Barker, of Shropham, (died)
  Philip Bedingfield, of Ditchingham, succeeded
- 1757 Israel Longe, of Dunston
- 1758 Hammond Alpe, of Little Fransham
- 1759 Richard Fuller, of Whetaere-Burgh
- 1760 John Berney, of Bracon Ash
- 1761 William Churchman, of Mangreen
- 1762 Sir Hanson Berney, Baronet of Kirby Bedon
- 1763 Sir Edward Astley, 4th Baronet of Melton Constable
- 1764 John Davis, of Watlington
- 1765 William Wiggett Bulwer, of Wood Dalling
- 1766 John Norris, of Great Witchingham
- 1767 Crisp Molineux, of Garboldisham
- 1768 William Woodley, of Eccles
- 1769 Edmund Rolfe (the younger), of Heacham
- 1770 John Micklethwaite, of Beeston St. Andrew
- 1771 James Smyth, of Topcroft
- 1772 Sir John Lombe, 1st Baronet of Great Melton
- 1773 Edward Hase, of Sall
- 1774 Thomas Lobb Chute, of South Pickenham
- 1775 Brigg Price Fountaine, of Narford
- 1776 Nicholas Styleman, of Snettisham
- 1777 Charles Gurneys, of Hedenham
- 1778 Sir Henry Peyton, 1st Baronet of Narborough
- 1779 John Berney Petre, of Westwick
- 1780 Sir Thomas Beauchamp Proctor, 2nd Baronet of Langley Park
- 1781 Robert Lee Doughty, of Hanworth
- 1782 Henry Lee Warner, of Walsingham
- 1783 Sir Martin ffolkes, 1st Baronet of Hillington, King's Lynn
- 1784 Sir Thomas Durrant, 1st Baronet of Scottow
- 1785 Sir Edward Stracey, of Rackheath
- 1786 Francis Longe, of Spixworth
- 1787 Edward Billingsley, of Hockwold cum Wilton
- 1788 Thomas Kerrich, of Geldestone
- 1789 Brampton Gurdon Dillingham, of Letton
- 1790 James Pell, of Snare-hill, near Thetford
- 1791 Sir John Fenn, Kt of East Dereham
- 1792 Anthony Hamond, of Westacre
- 1793 Edward Roger Pratt, of Ryston
- 1794 John Richard Dashwood, of Cockley Cley
- 1793 George Nelthorpe, of Lynford
- 1796 Thomas Browne Evans, of Kirby Bedon
- 1797 Joseph Wyndham, of Earsham
- 1798 George Stone, of Bedingham
- 1799 John Motteux, of Beachamwell
- 5 February 1800: Sir Roger Kerrison, of Brooke House

== 19th century ==
- 11 February 1801: Robert Marsham of Stratton Strawless
- 3 February 1802: Robert Wilson, of Didlington
- 3 February 1803: Thomas Hare, of Stow Hall
- 1 February 1804: Henry Styleman, of Snettisham
- 6 February 1805: John Moseley, of West Tofts
- 1 February 1806: John Morse, of Mount Ida
- 12 February 1806: Henry Lee Warner, of Walsingham
- 4 February 1807: John Morse, of Mount Ida
- 3 February 1808: John Thurston Mott, of Barningham
- 6 February 1809: James Coldham, of Anmer Hall
- 31 January 1810: Nathaniel Micklethwaite, of Beeston
- 8 February 1811: Charles Lucas, of Filby
- 24 January 1812: John Turner Hales, of Hardingham
- 10 February 1813: Thomas Trench Berney, of Bracon Ash
- 4 February 1814: Henry Hoste Henley, of Sandringham
- 13 February 1815: Thomas Thornhill, of Riddlesworth
- 1816: Sigismund Trafford Southwell, of Wroxham
- 1817: Henry Negus Burroughes of Burlingham
- 1818: Edward Lombe, of Great Melton
- 1819: Sir William Windham Dalling, 2nd Baronet of Earsham Hall
- 1820: George Samuel Kett, of Brooke
- 1821: Sir Jacob Astley, 6th Baronet of Melton Constable
- 1822: Sir Richard Paul Jodrell, 2nd Baronet of Sall
- 1823: Sir Edmund Knowles Lacon, 2nd Baronet of Ormesby House, Ormesby St Michael
- 1824: Theophilus Thornhagh Gurdon of Letton
- 1825: Sir Robert John Harvey, of Thorpe
- 1826: Sir Edmund Bacon of Raveningham, Bt
- 1827: Charles Tompson of Great Witchingham.
- 1828: William John Henry Browne Folkes, of Hillington
- 1829: Andrew Fontaine of Narford Hall
- 1830: George John Milles of North Elmham
- 1831: John Angerstein of Weeting
- 1832: William Lyde Wiggett Chute, of South Pickenham
- 1833: Sir William Beauchamp-Proctor, 3rd Baronet, of Langley Park
- 1834: Robert Marsham, of Stratton Strawless
- 1835: Hudson Gurney, of Keswick
- 1836: Anthony Hamond, of Westacre
- 1837: Jack Petre, of Westwick Hall
- 1838: Sir James Flower, 2nd Baronet, of Eccles
- 1839: Sir Thomas Hare, 2nd Baronet, of Stow Hall
- 1840: Henry Villebois, of Marsham House
- 1841: Sir John Buxton, 2nd Baronet, of Shadwell Lodge
- 1842: William Howe Windham, of Felbrigg
- 1843: William George Tyssen Daniel-Tyssen, of Foulden
- 1844: Sir John Boileau, 1st Baronet, of Ketteringham
- 1845: Theophilus Russell Buckworth, of Cockley Cley
- 1846: Charles Spencer Cowper, of Sandringham House
- 1847: Sir Jacob Preston, 2nd Baronet, of Beeston St Lawrence
- 1848: Wyrley Birch, of Wretham
- 1849: William Mason, of Necton
- 1850: Edward Roger Pratt, of Ryston Hall
- 1851: Sir Willoughby Jones, 3rd Baronet, of Cranmer Hall, Sculthorpe
- 1852: Frederick William Irby, of Boyland Hall
- 1853: Daniel Gurney, of North Runcton
- 1854: Benjamin Bond Cabbell, of Cromer Hall
- 1855: Brampton Gurdon, of Letton
- 1856: Robert Kellett Long, of Dunston
- 1857: Andrew Fountaine, of Narford Hall
- 1858: Stephens Lyne-Stephens, of Lynford Hall
- 1859: Hambleton Francis Custance, of Weston
- 1860: Henry Birkbeck, of Stoke Holy Cross
- 1861: John Thomas Mott, of Barningham
- 1862: Robert John Harvey Harvey, of Brundall
- 1863: Joseph Stonehewer Scott Chad, of Thursford
- 1864: Henry James Lee Warner, of Little Walsingham
- 1865: William Henry Trafford, of Wroxham
- 1866: William Amhurst Tyssen-Amhurst, of Didlington Hall,
- 1867: Albemarle Cator, of Woodbastwick
- 1868: Thomas Jones, 7th Viscount Ranelagh, of Saint Faiths
- 1869: Sir Thomas William Brograve Proctor-Beauchamp, 4th Baronet of Langley Park
- 1870: Sir Robert Buxton, 3rd Baronet of Shadwell Lodge
- 1871: Sir Josias Henry Stracey, 4th Baronet of Rackheath Park
- 1872: William Angerstein of Weeting Hall
- 1873: John Bathurst Graver Browne of Morley
- 1874: Robert Fellowes of Shotesham Park
- 1875: Sir Thomas Fowell Buxton, 3rd Baronet of Runton
- 1876: Sir William Hovell Browne ffolkes, 3rd Baronet of Hillington
- 1877: Edward Bowyer Sparke of Gunthorpe
- 1878: George John Holmes of Brooke
- 1878: William Robert Clayton, 6th Baronet
- 1879: Richard Bagge of Gaywood
- 1880: Hamon le Strange of Hunstanton Hall
- 1881: George Duckett Berney of Morton
- 1882: Sir Henry George Paston-Bedingfeld, 7th Baronet of Oxburgh Hall
- 1883: William Earle Gascoyne Lytton Bulwer of Quebec House
- 1884: Joshua Fielden of Beacharawell
- 1885: Robert Harvey Mason of Necton
- 1886: William Morris of Wretham Hall
- 1887: Sir Alfred Jodrell of Bayfield Hall, Baronet
- 1888: Major Michael Stocks of Wood Hall, Hilgay
- 1889: Henry William Bartholomew Edwards, of Hardingham
- 1890: Thomas Leigh Hare of Stow Bardolph
- 1891: Samuel Gurney Buxton of Catton
- 1892: Sir Edmund Broughton Knowles Lacon of Dunston, 4th Baronet
- 1893: Lieutenant-Colonel Clement William Joseph Unthank, of Intwood.
- 1894: John Henry Gurney of Keswick Hall
- 1895: Sir Nicholas Henry Bacon
- 1896: Richard Hanbury Joseph Gurney of Northrepps Hall
- 1897: Major George Nathaniel Micklethwait of Taverham Hall
- 1898: Simms Reeve, of Brancaster
- 1899:Henry Morris Upcher of Sheringham
- 1900: Sir Edmund Charles Nugent, Bt, of West Harling

== 20th century ==
- 1901: Major Robert Herbert Heath Jary
- 1902: John Nigel Gurney, of Sprowston (Note: Gurney died on 26 October 1902, and the office was filled by Mr. W. E. Hansell for the remainder of his period.)
- 1903: Arthur Henry Stuart Elwes of Congham
- 1904: Russell James Colman, of Bracondale
- 1905: Hugh Gurney Barclay, of Colney
- 1906: Sir George Ralph Leigh Hare, 3rd Baronet
- 1907: Henry Tywhitt Staniforth Patteson of Beeston St Andrew
- 1908: Edward Henry Evans-Lombe of Bylaugh Park
- 1909: Sir Edward Mann, 1st Baronet of Thelveton
- 1910: William John Birkbeck of Stratton Strawless
- 1911: William Harker, of Blofield Hall, Norwich
- 1912: William James Barry of Great Witchingham Hall
- 1913: Robert William Ketton of Felbrigg Hall, Norwich
- 1914: Sir Woolmer Rudolph Donati White, Bt.
- 1915: Charles Edward Strachan, of Heacham Hall
- 1916: Lionel Robinson of Old Buckenham Hall
- 1917: Captain George William Taylor, of Pickenham Hall, Swaffham
- 1918: Colonel Herbert Francis Smith, of Didlington Hall, Brandon
- 1919: Francis Hubert Barclay, of The Warren, Cromer
- 1920: John Cator of Woodbastwick Hall
- 1921: Reginald Laurence, of Felthorpe Hall, Norwich
- 1922: Edward Gurney Buxton of Catton Hall, Norwich
- 1923: Holcombe Ingleby, Sedgeford Hall, King's Lynn
- 1924: Augustus Leverton Jessopp, of Lexham Hall, Swaffham
- 1925: Michael Falcon, of Horstead House, Norwich
- 1926: Sir George Chamberlin, of Yelverton, Norfolk, Kt.
- 1927: Col. Edmund Roger Allday Kerrison, of Burgh Hall, Aylsham
- 1928: Major Sir Edward Paulet Stracey, of Rackheath Park, Norwich, 7th Baronet
- 1929: Stanley Christopherson, of Hill Close, Abbey Road, Sheringham
- 1930: Sir Bartle Henry Temple Frere, of South Walsham Hall, Kt.
- 1931: James Archibald Keith, of West Barsham Hall
- 1932: Major Quintin Edward Gurney, of Bawdeswell Hall, East Dereham
- 1933: Edward Thomas Boardman
- 1934: Capt. Geoffrey Russell Rees Colman, of The Chase, Framingham Pigot
- 1935: Charles Hugh Finch of Costessey, Norwich
- 1936: Major Stanley Brooke Winch, of Swannington Court
- 1937: Philip Ernest Tindal-Carill-Worsley, of East Carleton Manor
- 1938: Sir William Benjamin Gentle, of Ford Place, Thetford
- 1939: Edward John Mann, of Thelveton Hall, Scole, Diss
- 1940: Sir Basil Edgar Mayhew of Felthorpe Hall
- 1941: Cedric Clifton Brown of Congham Lodge, Hillington
- 1942: Captain Charles Benjamin Wilson of Irstead Lodge, Neatishead
- 1943: Michael Falcon of Burlingham House, North Burlingham
- 1944: Percy Charles Briscoe of Dudwick Hall, Buxton
- 1945: Anthony Buxton of Horsey Hall, Gt Yarmouth
- 1946: Vice-Admiral Charles Andrew Fountaine of Narford Hall, King's Lynn (died 24 March 1946)
- 1947: Alexander Peckover Doyle Penrose of Bradenham Hall, Thetford
- 1948: Colonel George Norman Scott-Chad of Pynkney Hall, Tattersett, East Rudham, Norfolk
- 1949: Lieut-Colonel Ion Bridges Hamilton Benn of Broad Farm, Rollesby, Norfolk
- 1950: Lieut-Colonel John Leslie of Brancaster, King's Lynn, Norfolk
- 1951: Robert Wyndham Ketton-Cremer of Felbrigg Hall, Norwich, Norfolk
- 1952: Captain Michael Edward Bowyer Sparke of Gunthorpe Hall, Melton Constable, Norfolk
- 1953: Thomas Robert Calthorpe Blofeld of Home Farm, Hoveton St. John, Wroxham, Norfolk.
- 1954: Major Charles Fellowes of Shotesham Park, Norwich.
- 1955: Raymond John Steffe Crisp of Kirby Cane Hall.
- 1956: Sir Edward Hulton Preston of Beeston Hall
- 1957: Lieut.-Colonel Henry John Cator of Woodbastwick Hall.
- 1958: Major Derek Swithin Allhusen of Claxton Manor, Norwich.
- 1959: Richard Quintin Gurney of Keswick Old Hall, Norwich
- 1960: Desmond Gurney Buxton of Hoveton Hall
- 1961: Henry Birkbeck of Westacre High House, Castleacre, King's Lynn
- 1962: Vice-Admiral Sir Edward Malcolm Evans-Lombe of Marlingford Hall, Norwich
- 1963: Major William Frederic Batt of Gresham Hall, Norwich
- 1964: Brigadier Hetherington Bulwer-Long of Heydon, Norwich
- 1965: Christopher Evelyn Kevill-Davies
- 1966: Major Stephen John Pope of Watlington Hall, King's Lynn
- 1967: Sydney Arthur Morse of Bergh Apton Manor, Bergh Apton
- 1968: Mark William Gerard Wathen of Bolwick Hall, Marsham, Norwich
- 1969: William Robert Brudenell Foster of Lexham Hall, King's Lynn
- 1970: Sir Timothy Colman of Bixley
- 1971: Eric Donald Mackintosh of Brooke House, Brooke, Norwich
- 1972: Richard Anthony Brooke Winch of Swanington Manor, Norwich
- 1973: Sir (Edward) Stephen Lycett Green, of Ken Hill, Snettisham, King's Lynn
- 1974: Sir Charles Edward Mott-Radclyffe of Barningham Hall, Matlask, Norwich
- 1975: Desmond Evelyn Longe of Woodton Grange, Bungay, Suffolk
- 1976: Sir Alex Alexander of Westwick Hall, Westwick, Norwich
- 1977: Sir John (Alfred Picton) Bagge, of Stradsett Hall, King's Lynn
- 1978: John Verel Berney of Hockering House, Hockering, near Dereham
- 1979: Michael Gascoigne Falcon of Keswick Old Hall, Norwich
- 1980: Major David Auldjo Jamieson, of The Drove House, Thornham, Hunstanton
- 1981: Richard Lovel Coke of Wessenham Hall, King's Lynn
- 1982: Richard Gordon Lombe Taylor of Conifer Hill, Starston, Harleston
- 1983: Timothy Humphrey Barclay of Middleton Tower, King's Lynn
- 1984: Captain Jonathan Sidney Peel of Barton Hall, Barton Turf
- 1985: Sir Jeffrey Lionel Darrell
- 1986: Francis Desmond McInnes Skinner of North Farm, Snetterton
- 1987: Lord Edward Anthony Charles FitzRoy of Norton Hall, Norton Subsource
- 1988: Captain William Hanslip Bulwer Bulwer-Long of Heydon Hall, Heydon
- 1989: Peter Neil Ralli Stewart-Richardson of Creake Abbey, Fakenham
- 1990: Archibald James Gurney of Bracon Lodge, Bracon Ash
- 1991: Thomas R. E. Cook of Gately
- 1992: Anthony Nicholas George Duckworth-Chad
- 1993: Robert Buscall of Carbrooke Hall
- 1994: Francis Cator of The Old House, Ranworth
- 1995: John Birkbeck of Litcham Hall
- 1996: Ian Duncan Robertson MacNicol of Stody Lodge, Melton Constable
- 1997: Lady Evans-Lombe of Marlingford Hall
- 1998: Andrew Edward Buxton of Hoveton Hall, Norwich
- 1999: Neil Foster of Lexham Hall

== 21st century ==
- 2000: Richard Wilson Jewson of Barnham Broom
- 2001: Theresa Courtauld of Baconsthorpe Manor
- 2002: Richard Eustace Thomas Gurney of Heggatt Hall, Horstead
- 2003: Sir Jeremy Bagge, of Stradsett Hall, Bt
- 2004: John Alistair Alston
- 2005: Sir Nicholas Bacon, 14th Baronet
- 2006: Nigel Rudolph Savory
- 2007: Julian Charles Marsham, 8th Earl of Romney
- 2008: Viscountess Knollys
- 2009: Robert George Russell Carter
- 2010: Charles William Leigh Barrett of Heydon
- 2011: Georgina Holloway of Dereham
- 2012: Henry G. Cator of Norwich
- 2013: Sarah, Countess of Leicester of Holkham Hall, Wells-next-the-Sea
- 2014: Lady Dannatt, of The Mill House, Keswick, Norwich
- 2015: Nicholas Pratt of Mousehall, Ryston, Downham Market, Norfolk 0AB
- 2016: Major General Sir William Cubitt
- 2017: (Alfred) James Stephen Bagge of Stradsett, King's Lynn
- 2018: Charles Jonathon Watt of Stoke Holy Cross, Norwich
- 2019: Claire Margaret Agnew, Lady Agnew of East Somerton, Great Yarmouth
- 2020: Georgina, Lady Roberts of Swaffham (wife of Sir Samuel Roberts, 4th Baronet)
- 2021: Michael Anthony James Gurney of Northrepps, Cromer.
- 2022: David John McLeavy Hill of Shotesham All Saints, Norwich
- 2023: Professor Krishna Kumar Sethia of Hedenham
- 2024: David James Flux of East Winch, King's Lynn
- 2025: Patrick Simon Lines, Dereham
- 2026: Jonathan Charles Pearson, Thetford
