= Great Moulton =

Civil parish in Norfolk, England

Coordinates: 52.46645°N 1.18862°E

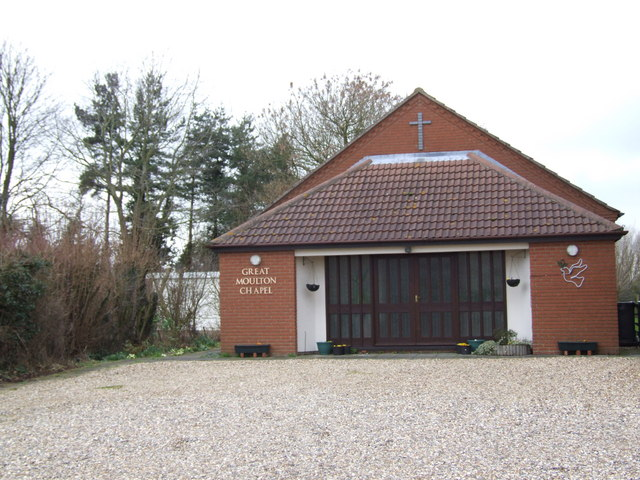
- Great Moulton Chapel

- Location within Norfolk
- Area: 5.66 km^{2} (2.19 sq mi)
- Population: 751 (2011)
  - Density: 133/km^{2} (340/sq mi)
- OS grid reference: TM166901
- Civil parish: Great Moulton
- District: South Norfolk
- Shire county: Norfolk
- Region: East
- Country: England
- Sovereign state: United Kingdom
- Post town: NORWICH
- Postcode district: NR15
- Dialling code: 01379
- Police: Norfolk
- Fire: Norfolk
- Ambulance: East of England

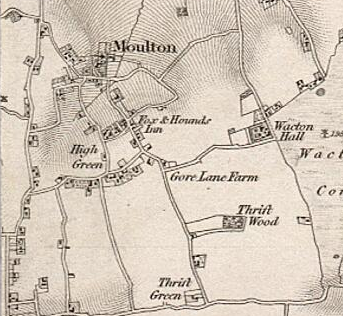
Map of Great Moulton in the Ordnance Survey first series, sheet 66

Great Moulton (also known as Moulton St Michael) is a civil parish in the English county of Norfolk. Until the 16th century it also included the Little Moulton parish.

It covers an area of 5.66 km^{2} (2.19 sq mi) and had a population of 699 in 289 households at the 2001 census, increasing to 751 at the 2011 census. For the purposes of local government, it falls within the district of South Norfolk. The parish is close to the nearby village of Aslacton.

== History ==
Great Moulton is mentioned in Domesday Book five times and had a relatively large population for a rural Norfolk village, consisting of more than seventy households (in 2011 there were over 300) as well as a church. The lord in 1086 was Count Alan of Brittany.

In the 1870s, Great Moulton was described as:

... Adjacent to the Great Eastern railway, midway between Tivetshall and Forncett stations, and seven miles NW of Harleston; and has a pub called Fox and Hound, of the name of Moulton, under Long Stratton. The parish contains also the hamlet of Little Moulton, and comprises 1,347 acres. The church has a round tower, surmounted by an octagonal lantern

In 1924, Charles Chute gave the advowson of the parish to Bertram Pollock, Bishop of Norwich, and his successors.

=== Chapel ===
A chapel originally found in Great Moulton was donated to the Museum of East Anglian Life and is a "tin tabernacle", which is common in the area. It was built in the 1890s and cost the equivalent of £20,000 in today's money. The community built a new chapel in the 1990s which is why the previous was donated.

== Transport ==
The village is served by the 1 bus route between Diss and Norwich, which has four stops within the parish. The nearest train station is Spooner Row which is 7.42 miles away, and also has Norwich and Brundall train stations within 20 miles of the chapel.

Car ownership is relatively high, as only nineteen households in 2011 did not own one or more car or van, and there are 585 cars or vans in the area.

== Statistics ==
=== Occupations ===
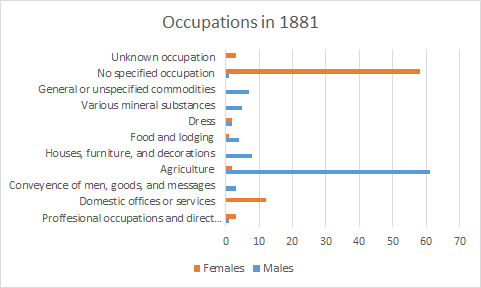
Occupations in Great Moulton Civil Parish, Norfolk as reported in 1881 census

In 1881 just over 60 men were involved with agriculture, which was the largest occupation at the time. Many of the workers were employed as an agricultural labourer, farm servant or cottager. The next most popular job for men was work in houses, furniture or decorations, with 8 male workers employed in this profession. Most of the women during 1881 were not in specific occupations, although 12 women were employed in domestic offices or services, with the next most popular job for females being work in professional occupations and their direct subordinates, with 3 women and one male employed. Comparatively, in 2011, of the 402 residents employed in Great Moulton only ten males were working in the agricultural sector, and 48 men were employed in construction, which had the highest number of male employees. Over 50 women were employed in administrative and secretarial occupations, and 16 women were employed as managers, directors and senior officials. Overall the most common job is work in wholesale and retail trade; repair of motor vehicles and motor cycles which had 65 employees.

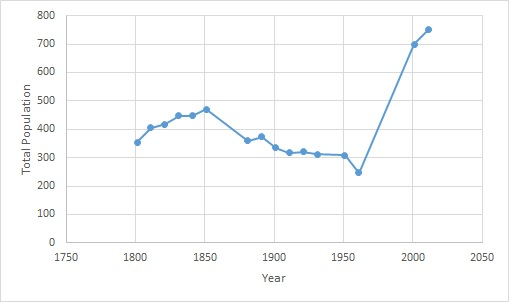
Total population of Great Moulton Civil Parish, Norfolk, as reported by the census of population from 1801 to 2011

=== Population ===
The total population of Great Moulton was at its lowest in 1961 with a total of 247, where there was then it showed an increase of 500 people in 50 years, leading to 751 people living in Great Moulton to date. When the census began in 1801, the population was at 354 residents, where it gently increased to the highest population prior to 2001, which was 1851 with a total population of over 450 people.

=== Age ===
208 residents are aged 45–59, making this the largest age range. Forty-seven people are under the age of ten, with a further 55 under the age of sixteen, and the most common age range for children is 10–14. 163 residents of Great Moulton are over 65, 113 of which are under 75.

=== Ethnicity ===
Of the 751 residents of Great Moulton, 730 are white British, four people are from multiple ethnic backgrounds, one person is Irish and a further fourteen have an other white background, which is relatively diverse for a civil parish.
