= William Bagge =

British politician (1810–1880)

Sir William Bagge, 1st Baronet (17 June 1810 – 12 February 1880) was a Conservative Party politician in the United Kingdom. He was Member of Parliament (MP) for West Norfolk from 1837 to 1857, and from 1865 to 1880. He was made a baronet in 1867, of Stradsett Hall, in the County of Norfolk.

He was the son of Thomas Philip Bagge and Grace Salisbury, from whom he inherited Stradsett Hall, a large mansion in the parish of Stradsett, near Downham Market in west Norfolk.

He married Frances Preston, with whom he had six children: four daughters, followed by two sons, William (Sir William Bagge, 2nd Baronet) and Thomas (Sir Thomas Bagge, 3rd Baronet). Bagge was succeeded by his first son, William, in the baronetcy, but he died childless a year later and was succeeded by his younger brother, Sir Alfred Thomas Bagge, 3rd Baronet.

Between 1836 and 1839, Bagge played in four important matches for Norfolk and Marylebone Cricket Club (MCC), scoring seven runs, holding two catches and taking one wicket.

Parliament of the United Kingdom
Preceded by Sir William ffolkes, Bt; Sir Jacob Astley, Bt	Member of Parliament for West Norfolk; 1837–1857; With: William Lyde Wiggett Chute, 1837–1847; Hon. Edward Coke, 1847–1852; George Bentinck, 1852–1865	Succeeded by Brampton Gurdon; George Bentinck
Preceded by Brampton Gurdon; George Bentinck	Member of Parliament for West Norfolk; 1865–1880; With: Hon. Thomas de Grey, 1865–1871; George Bentinck, 1871–1884	Succeeded by William Tyssen-Amherst; George Bentinck
Baronetage of the United Kingdom
New creation	Baronet (of Stradsett Hall, Norfolk); 1867–1880	Succeeded by William Bagge
