= Astley baronets of Everley (1821) =

Extinct baronetcy in the Baronetage of the United Kingdom

Astley baronets
- Escutcheon of the Astley, later Astley-Corbett, later Astley baronets, of Everley
- Creation date: 1821
- Status: extinct
- Extinction date: 1994
- Motto: Fide sed cui vide, Trust, but be careful whom

The Astley, later Astley-Corbett, later Astley Baronetcy, of Everley in the County of Wiltshire, was created in the Baronetage of the United Kingdom on 15 August 1821 for John Astley, Member of Parliament for Wiltshire and Wiltshire North. He was a descendant of Thomas Astley, younger brother of the first Baronet of Patshull. The third Baronet represented Lincolnshire North in Parliament as a Conservative. He married Eleanor Blanche Mary, daughter of Thomas George Corbett. Their eldest son, Francis, the fourth Baronet, assumed by Royal licence the additional surname of Corbett in 1890. His grandson, Francis, the fifth Baronet, was killed in action in World War II.

== Astley, later Astley-Corbett, later Astley baronets, of Everley (1821) ==
- Sir John Dugdale Astley, 1st Baronet (1778–1842)
- Sir Francis Dugdale Astley, 2nd Baronet (1805–1873)
- Sir John Dugdale Astley, 3rd Baronet (1828–1894)
- Sir Francis Edmund George Astley-Corbett, 4th Baronet (1859–1939)
  - John Dugdale Pelham Astley-Corbett (1883–1937), eldest son of the 4th Baronet and father of the 5th Baronet
- Sir Francis Henry Rivers Astley-Corbett, 5th Baronet (1915–1943)
- Sir Francis Jacob Dudley Astley, 6th Baronet (1908–1994)

The title became extinct on the death in 1994 of the sixth Baronet, who left no heir.

== See also ==
- Astley baronets
- Astley baronets of Patshull (1662)
- Baron Astley (1295)

== Notes ==
Baronetage of the United Kingdom
Preceded by Fremantle baronets	Astley baronets of Everley; 15 August 1821	Succeeded by Boswell baronets
