= Bintree =

Village in Norfolk, England

Coordinates: 52.772°N 0.990°E

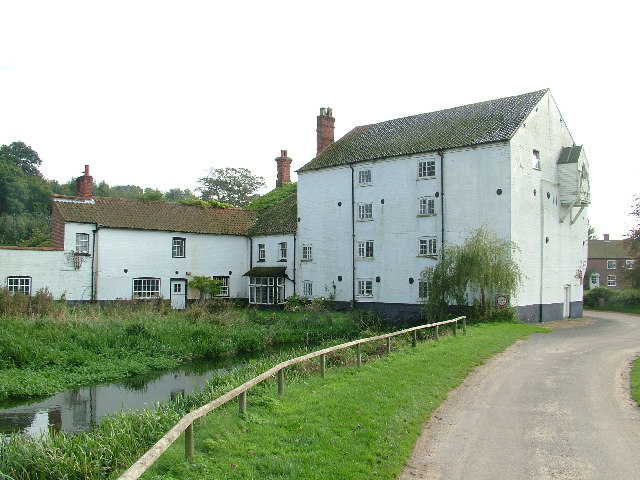
- Bintry Mill 2005

- Location within Norfolk
- Area: 5.99 km^{2} (2.31 sq mi)
- Population: 327 2021 United Kingdom census
  - Density: 55/km^{2} (140/sq mi)
- OS grid reference: TG019236
- Civil parish: Bintree
- District: Breckland
- Shire county: Norfolk
- Region: East
- Country: England
- Sovereign state: United Kingdom
- Post town: DEREHAM
- Postcode district: NR20
- Dialling code: 01362
- Police: Norfolk
- Fire: Norfolk
- Ambulance: East of England
- UK Parliament: Mid Norfolk

Bintree is a village and civil parish in the English county of Norfolk. It is about 7.2 miles (11.6 km) south-east of Fakenham and 16 miles (26 km) north-west of Norwich.

== History ==
Bintree's name is of Anglo-Saxon origin, although there is evidence for much earlier habitation. Archeological evidence include Neolithic tools and Roman pottery & coinage.

Bintree is listed in the Domesday Book of 1086 as a settlement of 29 households in the hundred of Eynesford. In 1086, Bintee was divided between the estates of Godric the Steward, Walter Giffard and Hagni the Reeve.

In 1759, John Astley became Rector of Bintree whilst also holding the benefices of Brinton and Thornage.

In the 19th-century, Norfolk County School was built within the parish. In 1895, the school was closed and purchased by Edmund Watts who used it to train children from the care of Thomas John Barnardo for service with the Royal Navy. The school was used during the Second World War, but demolished in the 1960s.

== Geography ==
Bintree is located along the A1067 road which runs between Fakenham and Norwich. The River Wensum runs through the parish. According to the 2021 census, the population of the parish was 327.

Amenities within the village include the Royal Oak public house and a farmshop.

== St. Swithun's church ==
Richard Enraght's gravestone at St Swithun Church, Bintree

The parish church is dedicated to Saint Swithun and dates from the 14th-century, with a replacement chancel being built in 1864. Stained glass within the church includes a depiction of the crucifixion by Alexander Gibbs, a depiction of Christ by William Wailes, and one of the annunciation by Horace Wilkinson. The church is Grade II listed. In the churchyard a Grade II listed grave cover is possibly the grave of Richard de Langbrigg, a parish priest who died in 1270.

Richard Enraght, an Anglo-Irish Church of England priest, who had previously been imprisoned for attempting to bring more Catholic ritualism into Anglican church services, was appointed to the position of Vicar of St. Swithun's Church, Bintree in 1895. Enraght died within the parish in 1898 and is buried in St. Swithun's Churchyard.

== Bintry Watermill ==
A watermill has stood on the site of Bintry Watermill since the mid-15th Century, although the present structure dates from the 18th-century. The structure is Grade II listed.

== Governance ==
Bintree is part of the electoral ward of Upper Wensum for local elections and is part of the district of Breckland. It is in the Mid Norfolk parliamentary constituency.

== Notable people ==
- John Astley (1735-1803), Church of England clergyman.
- Richard Enraght (1837-1898), Anglo-Irish clergyman.
