= Simon Taylor =

Simon Taylor may refer to:

== People ==
- Simon Taylor (MP) (died 1689), English politician and merchant
- Simon Taylor (sugar planter) (1739–1813), British sugar planter in Jamaica
- Simon Taylor (journalist) (born 1944), British motor sport writer and editor
- Simon Taylor (artist) (born 1969), English artist
- Simon Taylor (footballer, born 1970), Australian rules footballer who played for the Collingwood Football Club
- Simon Taylor (rugby union) (born 1979), Scottish rugby union footballer
- Simon Taylor (footballer, born 1982), Australian rules footballer who played for the Hawthorn Football Club
- Simon Taylor (musician) (born 1983), drummer, formerly with InMe
- Simon Watson-Taylor (landowner) (1811–1902), English landowner and politician
- Simon Watson Taylor (anarchist) (1923–2005), English anarchist and translator

== Other ==
- Simon Taylor (ship), convict ship to Western Australia
