= Briningham =

Village in Norfolk, England

Coordinates: 52.868°N 1.025°E

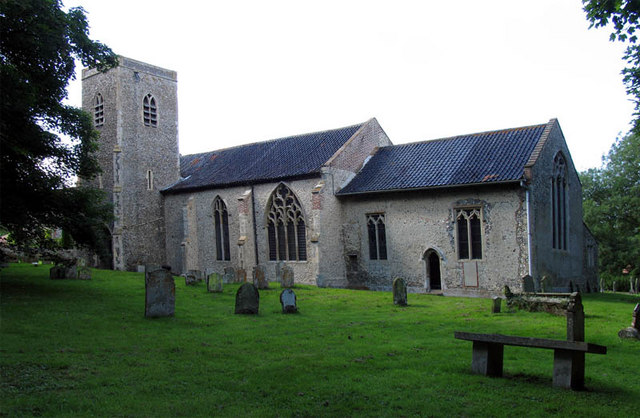
- St. Maurice's Church, Briningham

- Location within Norfolk
- Area: 4.96 km^{2} (1.92 sq mi)
- Population: 112 (2021)
  - Density: 23/km^{2} (60/sq mi)
- OS grid reference: TG030340
  - London: 124 miles (200 km)
- District: North Norfolk
- Shire county: Norfolk
- Region: East
- Country: England
- Sovereign state: United Kingdom
- Post town: MELTON CONSTABLE
- Postcode district: NR24
- Dialling code: 01263
- Police: Norfolk
- Fire: Norfolk
- Ambulance: East of England
- UK Parliament: North Norfolk

Briningham is a village and a civil parish in the English county of Norfolk. It is 3.5 miles (5.6 km) south-west of Holt and 20 miles (32 km) north-west of Norwich.

== History ==
Briningham's name is of Anglo-Saxon origin and is recorded in the Domesday Book as a settlement of 35 households in the hundred of Holt which was part of the estates of Alan of Brittany and Bishop William of Thetford.

Bellevue Tower thought to be the remains of a smock mill built in 1721 on the orders of Sir Jacob Astley. Briningham Hall was built in 1838 in the Greek Revival style.

== Geography ==
According to the 2021 census, Briningham has a population of 112 people which shows a slight decrease from the 130 people recorded in the 2011 census.

The B1110, between Holt and Dereham, runs through the village. The nearest railway station is at Sheringham for the Bittern Line which runs between Sheringham, Cromer and Norwich. There is an abandoned railway line which is considered as a footpath, it runs parallel with an old track "the lane" that leads up to Bellevue Tower. The nearest airport is Norwich International Airport.

== St. Maurice's Church ==
Briningham's parish church is dedicated to Saint Maurice and dates at its earliest to 1300. The building is Grade I listed. The church has stained glass depicting the ascension of Christ by William Wailes (installed 1862) and another depicting Saint Cecilia and Saint Agnes by Alfred L. Wilkinson. Within the churchyard there is a large monument made from stone dedicated to a family of local landowners, the Breretons.

== Notable people ==
- Peter Whitbread, English actor and screenwriter who lived and died in Briningham.

== Gallery ==
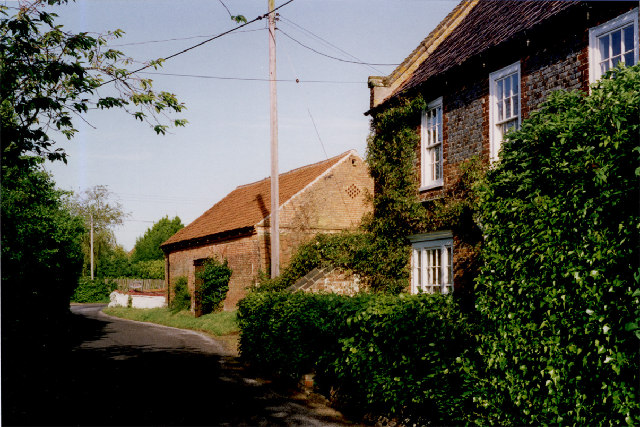
"The Street"

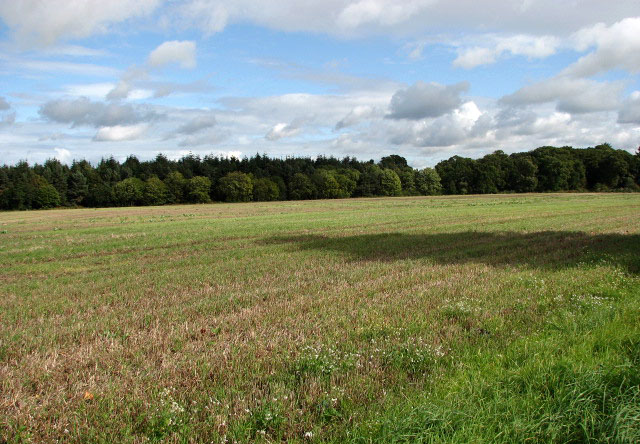
Briningham Plantation Viewed across harvested cereal field beside the B1354

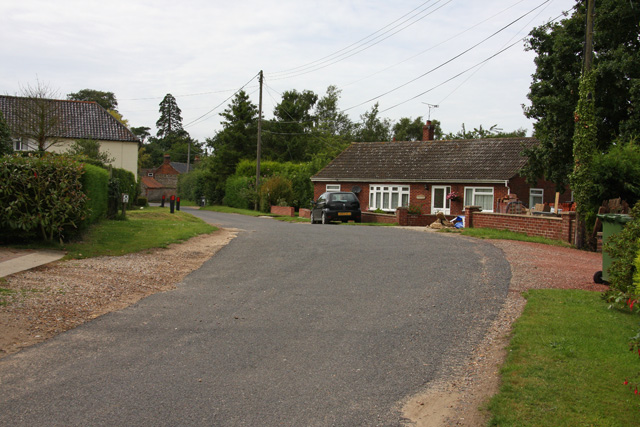
"The Street"

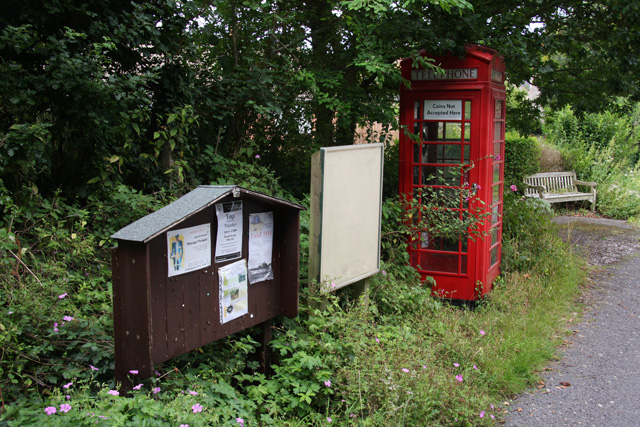
The bus now calls at the houses of people who have phoned the day before requesting to be collected

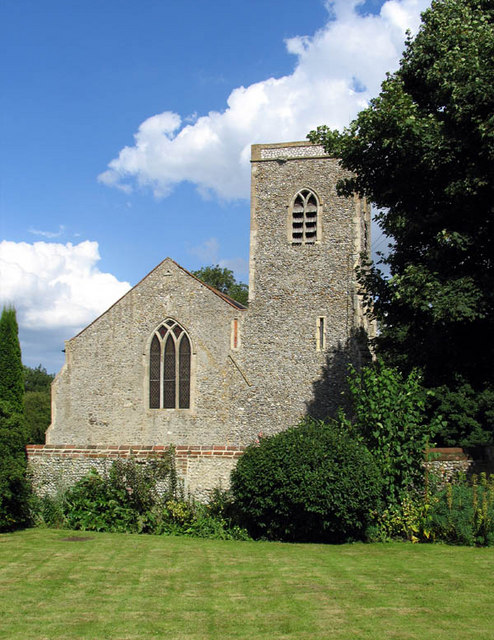
St Maurice Church

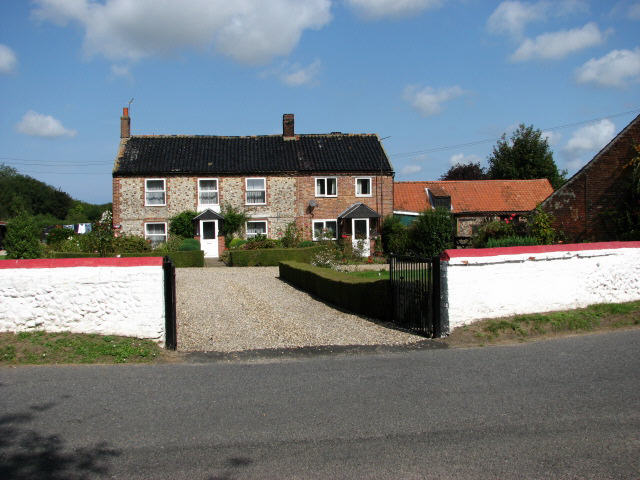
Houses on The Street
