= Astley baronets of Hill Morton (1660) =

Baronetcy in the Baronetage of England

Astley baronets
- Astley baronets of Hill Morton (1660)
- Creation date: 1660
- Status: extant
- Former seat(s): Melton Constable, Seaton Delaval

The Astley Baronetcy, of Hillmorton in the County of Warwick, was created in the Baronetage of England on 25 June 1660 for Jacob Astley, nephew of the first Baronet of Melton Constable. For more information on this creation, see Baron Hastings.

== Background ==
The Astley family were descended from Sir Thomas de Astley of Astley, Warwickshire, who was killed in the Battle of Evesham in 1265. He married twice. From his first marriage to Joane de Blois descended the Astley baronets of Patshull, whose family seat was at Patshull Hall, Staffordshire, and the Astley baronets of Everley, Wiltshire. From his second marriage to Editha Constable of Melton Constable, Norfolk, descended the Astley baronets of Melton Constable, the Astley baronets of Hillmorton (who succeeded as Barons Hastings – of the 1295 creation), and the Barons Astley of Reading.

== Astley baronets, of Hill Morton (1660) ==
- Sir Jacob Astley, 1st Baronet (c.1639–1729)
- Sir Philip Astley, 2nd Baronet (1667–1739)
- Sir Jacob Astley, 3rd Baronet (1692–1760)
- Sir Edward Astley, 4th Baronet (1729–1802)
- Sir Jacob Henry Astley, 5th Baronet (1756–1817)
- Sir Jacob Astley, 6th Baronet (1797–1859) (succeeded as Baron Hastings in 1841)

Delaval Astley, 23rd Baron Hastings does not use the title in Who's Who. On the other hand, he is officially listed as the 13th Baronet.

== See also ==
- Astley baronets
