= John Astley (clergyman) =

John Astley (1735 – 28 May 1803) was a Church of England clergyman and pluralist, Rector of Thornage, Brinton, Bintree, and Foulsham in Norfolk.

== Early life ==
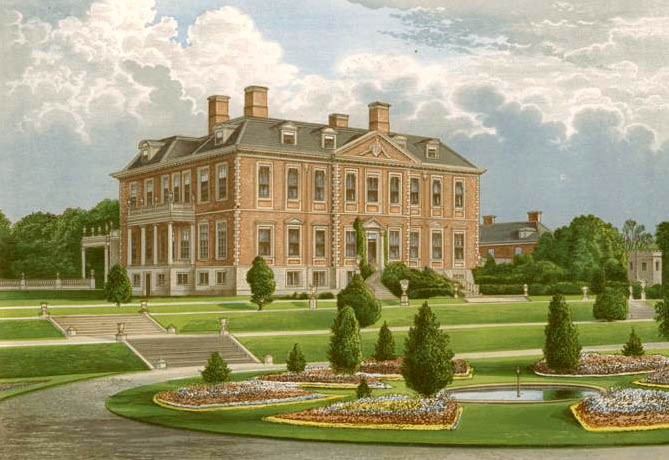
Melton Constable Hall

A younger son of Sir Jacob Astley, 3rd Baronet (1692–1760), of Melton Constable Hall, Norfolk, Astley was born in 1735 at Hindolveston. His mother, Dame Lucy, was a daughter of Sir Nicholas L'Estrange, of Hunstanton. He was educated at Holt Grammar School, under John Holmes, and Bury Grammar School.

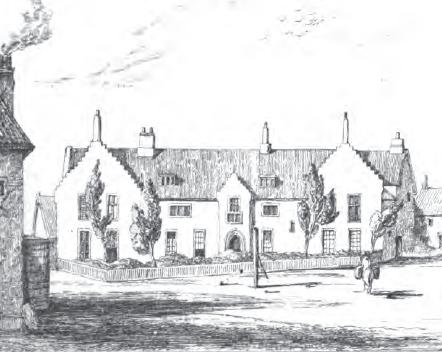
Holt Grammar School

At Easter 1752, aged seventeen, Astley was admitted to Caius College, Cambridge, where he held a scholarship for four years, until 1756. He graduated LL.B. in 1759.

== Career ==
At Norwich on 19 February 1758 Astley was ordained by Thomas Hayter as a deacon and then eight months later as a priest. The same year, he was appointed as Rector of Thornage and Brinton, Norfolk, benefices he held until his death. He was presented to Brinton by his father, who was patron of the living.

Without retiring from Thornage or Brinton, Astley was also Rector of Bintree from 1759 to 1771 and of Foulsham from 1771 to 1803, having exchanged those two benefices.

== Personal life ==
In 1762, Astley married Catherine, a daughter of Philip Bell, Esquire, of Wallington Hall, Norfolk.

Astley was a brother of Sir Edward Astley, 4th Baronet, one of the members of parliament for the Norfolk constituency.

On the death of his father in 1760, Astley inherited the advowson of Gorleston, together with properties there.

A monumental inscription at Thornage notes that in 1763, 1768, 1769, and 1773 Astley and his wife lost four children, each of them only a few days old.

Astley died in 1803, leaving a life interest in his Gorleston estate to his widow, with the reversion to his two surviving daughters, Catherine, who died unmarried in 1828, and Lucy, who married Thomas Browne. In 1808, Catherine Astley presented Browne to the Gorleston living, and he held it until his death in 1832, having in the mean time served as Master of Christ's College, Cambridge. Astley’s widow survived him until 1818.
