= Baron Astley of Reading =

Extinct barony in the Peerage of England

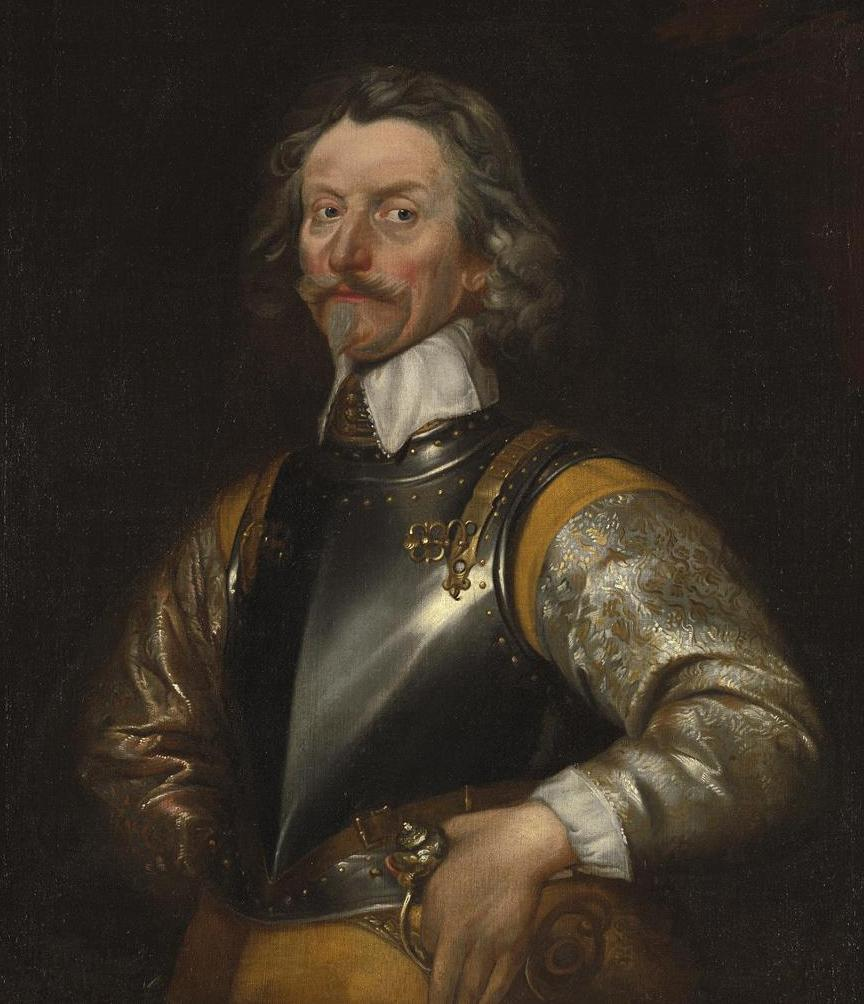
Jacob Astley, 1st Baron Astley of Reading.

Baron Astley of Reading, in the County of Berkshire, was a title in the Peerage of England. It was created in 1644 for the Royalist soldier Sir Jacob Astley. He was a descendant of Ralph Astley (13th century), brother of Andrew de Astley, ancestor of the Barons Astley. The title became extinct on the death of Lord Astley of Reading's grandson, the third Baron, in 1688.

The first Baron was the uncle of Sir Isaac Astley, 1st Baronet, and the great-uncle of Sir Jacob Astley, 1st Baronet.

== Barons Astley of Readings (1644) ==
- Jacob Astley, 1st Baron Astley of Reading (died 1651)
- Isaac Astley, 2nd Baron Astley of Reading (died 1662)
- Jacob Astley, 3rd Baron Astley of Reading (died 1688)

== See also ==
- Baron Astley (1295)
- Astley baronets
- Baron Hastings
