= Baron Astley =

Baron Astley may refer to:

- Baron Astley (1295)
- Baron Astley of Reading
