= Sir John Holland, 2nd Baronet =

British Whig politician

Sir John Holland, 2nd Baronet (c. 1669 – by July 1724), of Quidenham Hall, Norfolk was a British Whig politician who sat in the English and British House of Commons from 1701 to 1710.

== Early life ==
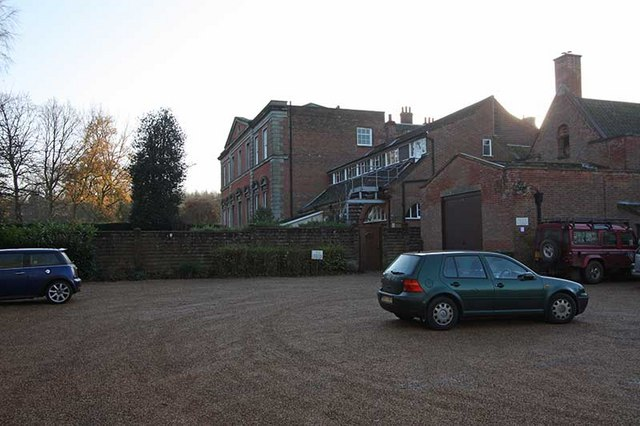
Quidenham Hall

Holland was the second, but eldest surviving son of Thomas Holland of Bury St Edmunds, Suffolk, and his second wife Elizabeth Meade, daughter of Thomas Meade of Wenden Lofts, Essex. He was educated at Bury St Edmunds grammar school under Mr Leeds, and was at Christ's College, Cambridge from September 1685 to 1687. He succeeded his father in 1698.

In May 1699, he married Lady Rebecca Paston, daughter of William Paston, 2nd Earl of Yarmouth and his wife Charlotte FitzRoy, illegitimate daughter of Charles II of England. He succeeded his grandfather Sir John Holland, 1st Baronet to the baronetcy and Quidenham on 19 January 1701.

== Career ==
Holland was returned in a contest as Member of Parliament for Norfolk at the second general election of 1701. He made his first recorded speech on 24 February 1702 and was a teller for the Whigs six times. He was returned again at the 1702 English general election and continued to be very active in Parliament, particularly as a teller for the Whigs. At the 1705 English general election he was returned unopposed as a Whig MP for Norfolk. He seconded the nomination of the Court's candidate for Speaker on 25 October 1705 and acted as teller for the Whigs on several occasions. He was returned again as a Whig for Norfolk at the 1708 British general election. In March 1708 he spoke for the Bishop of Carlisle’s cathedrals bill, and was appointed on 11 March to the committee to draw up an address to press for continued vigorous prosecution of the war, and subsequently reported from the committee. He voted for the naturalization of the Palatines in 1709. In March 1709 he was appointed Comptroller of the Household, and was sworn a Privy Counsellor on 2 June 1709. On 14 December 1709 he was asked to prepare the articles of impeachment against Dr Sacheverell, and became a manager of the impeachment. He voted for the impeachment and helped present the prosecution’s case on 28 February 1710. The Norfolk Whigs decided not to put him forward at the 1710 British general election, probably because his fellow Whigs did not like his generally remiss behaviour, and he was unable to secure another seat then or at the 1713 British general election. He was dismissed from his office in the household in June 1711 but he was paid his arrears of salary and was given an extra £250 as royal bounty in 1712.

Holland did not receive anything from George I and turned against the Norfolk Whig establishment. He did not stand at the 1715 British general election, but challenged the Townsend-Walpole interest unsuccessfully at Great Yarmouth at the 1722 British general election.

== Death and legacy ==
Holland died in about 1724, and was buried at Quidenham. Through his wife, Rebecca, their two sons and three daughters were great-grandchildren of Charles II. He was succeeded in the baronetcy by his son William.

Parliament of England
| Preceded by Sir Jacob Astley, Bt; Hon. Roger Townshend | Member of Parliament for Norfolk; 1701–1707; With: Hon. Roger Townshend to 1702; Sir Jacob Astley, Bt 1702–05; Hon. Roger Townshend from 1705 | Succeeded by Parliament of Great Britain |
Parliament of Great Britain
| Preceded by Parliament of England | Member of Parliament for Norfolk; 1707–1715; With: Hon. Roger Townshend to 1708; Ashe Windham 1708–10; Sir John Wodehouse, Bt 1710–13; Sir Edmund Bacon, Bt 1713–15 | Succeeded by Thomas de Grey; Sir Jacob Astley, Bt |
Baronetage of England
| Preceded by John Holland | Baronet (of Quiddenham); 1701–1724 | Succeeded by William Holland |
