= Ashe Windham =

English landowner and politician

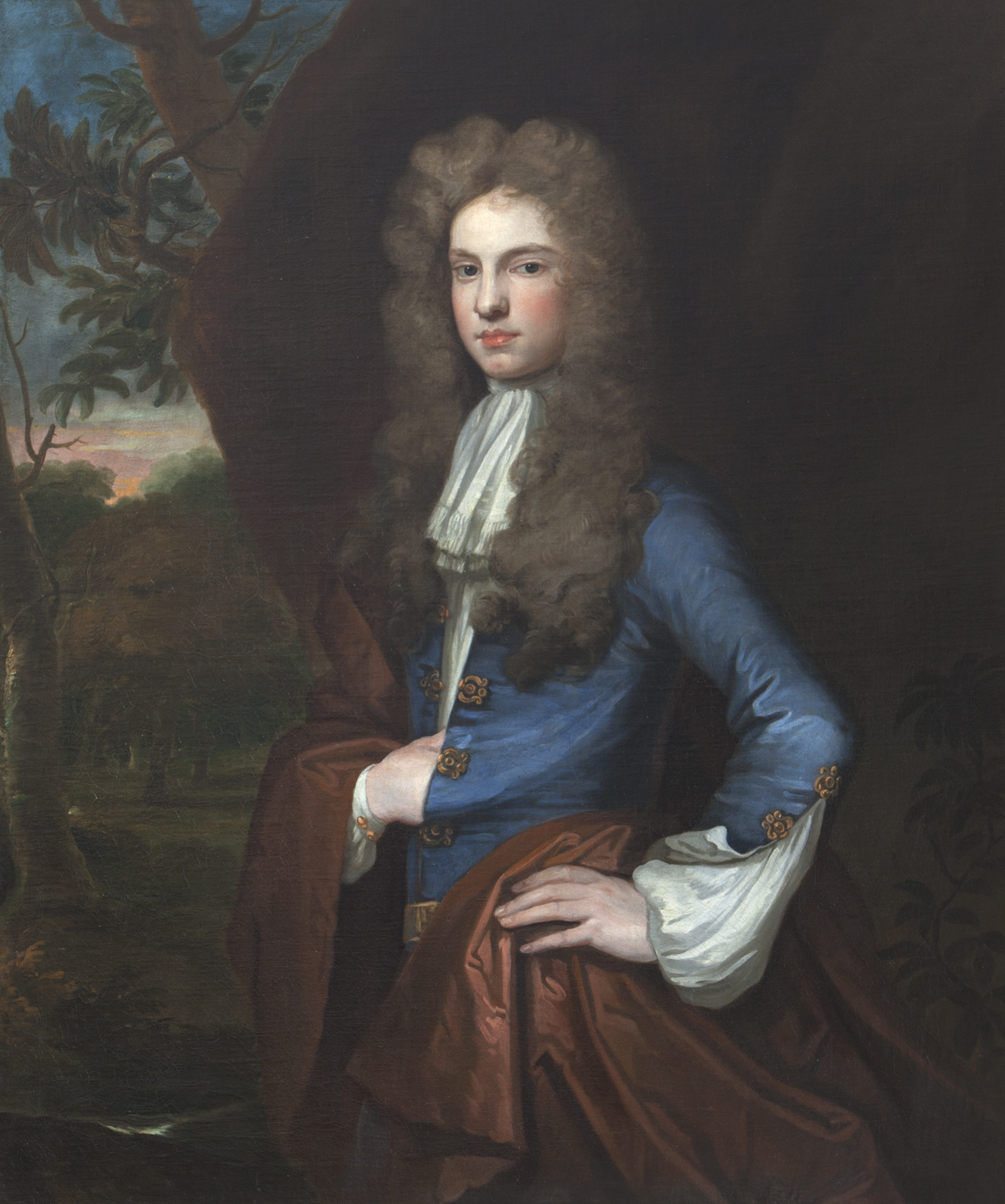
- Windham by Godfrey Kneller, 1689 (Felbrigg Hall)

Member of Parliament for Norfolk
- In office 1708–1710

Personal details
- Born: 17 February 1673
- Died: 4 April 1749 (aged 76) Felbrigg
- Resting place: Felbrigg
- Party: Whigs
- Spouse: Elizabeth Dobyns
- Children: 1 legitimate; 1 illegitimate
- Parents: William Windham (father); Katherine Ashe (mother)
- Relatives: Sir James Ashe, 2nd Baronet (uncle)

Ashe Windham (17 February 1673 – 4 April 1749), of Felbrigg, Norfolk, was an English landowner and politician who sat in the House of Commons from 1708 to 1710.

== Life ==
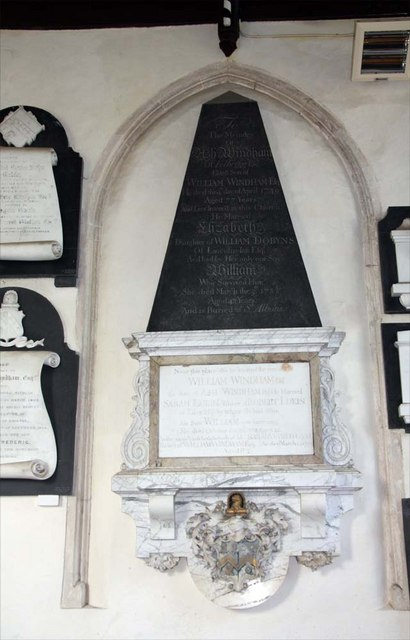
Mural monument to Ashe Windham, St Margaret's Church, Felbrigg

Windham was the eldest son of William Windham of Felbrigg (died 1689) and his wife Katherine Ashe, daughter of Sir Joseph Ashe, 1st Baronet of Twickenham. His maternal uncle was Sir James Ashe, 2nd Baronet and his brothers were William Windham and Joseph Windham Ashe. The Windham family had had a seat at Felbrigg Hall since the mid-15th century. Whilst at Eton College he succeeded his father in 1689. After attending King's College, Cambridge, he took a grand tour round Italy between 1693 and 1696.

In 1708, he was due to marry Hester Buckworth, but she died, and a year later, in summer 1709, he married a wealthy heiress, Elizabeth Dobyns, the daughter and heir of William Dobyns of Lincoln's Inn.

== Parliamentary career ==
Windham was first considered as a parliamentary candidate in 1699, for Norfolk (his father had unsuccessfully run for it in 1679 as a Whig). However, according to Humphrey Prideaux, his grand tour counted against him:

having had an Italian education, [he] is all over Italiz’d, that is an Italian as to religion, I mean a downright atheist; an Italian in politics, that is a Commonwealthsman; and an Italian I doubt in his morals, for he cannot be persuaded to marry. He is . . . of a tolerable good understanding and an estate of £4,000 per annum.

Windham stepped down from the 1705 election campaign in favour of his friend and cousin Roger Townshend, whom he replaced at the 1708 British general election, contesting the seat unopposed and becoming the first of his family to sit in Parliament. That year he was said to possess "as great estate as any commoner in the country".

Windham was one of the main MPs behind an unsuccessful address to Queen Anne on 25 January 1709 requesting that she remarry. He voted for the naturalization of the Palatines in 1709 and for the impeachment of Dr Sacheverell in 1710. He and Robert Walpole II stood for Norfolk at the 1710 British general election but were defeated and he declined to stand again in 1713.

== Later life and legacy ==
Windham's marriage failed, and after the birth of a son in 1717, the couple parted. He retired to Felbrigg to manage his estates and look after the education of his son. He also had one illegitimate daughter.

A portrait of Windham by Sir Godfrey Kneller is owned by the National Trust and held at Felbrigg.

Parliament of Great Britain
Preceded by Hon. Roger Townshend; Sir John Holland, Bt	Member of Parliament for Norfolk; 1708–1710; With: Sir John Holland, Bt	Succeeded by Sir John Wodehouse, Bt; Sir Jacob Astley, Bt
