= Guist =

Village in Norfolk, England

Coordinates: 52.7906°N 0.96335°E

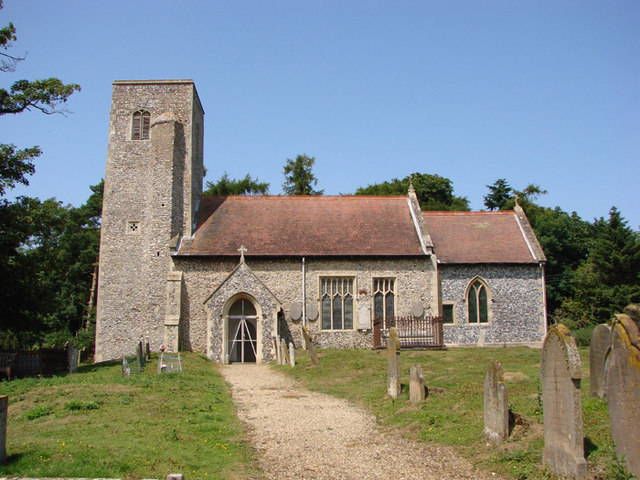
- St. Andrew's Church

- Location within Norfolk
- Area: 11.54 sq mi (29.9 km^{2})
- Population: 267 (2021 census)
  - Density: 23/sq mi (8.9/km^{2})
- OS grid reference: TF999255
- Civil parish: Guist
- District: Breckland
- Shire county: Norfolk
- Region: East
- Country: England
- Sovereign state: United Kingdom
- Post town: DEREHAM
- Postcode district: NR20
- Dialling code: 01362
- Police: Norfolk
- Fire: Norfolk
- Ambulance: East of England
- UK Parliament: Mid Norfolk

Guist (/ˈɡaɪst/) is a village and civil parish in the English county of Norfolk. The civil parish also includes the nearby hamlet of Twyford.

Guist is located 7.6 miles (12.2 km) north of Dereham and 18 miles (29 km) north-west of Norwich.

== History ==
Guist's name is of Anglo-Saxon origin and derives from the Old English for Gaega's dwelling.

In the Domesday Book, Guist is listed as a settlement of 29 households in the hundred of Wayland. In 1086, the village was part of the East Anglian estates of King William I, William de Warenne, Roger Bigod, Ralph Baynard and John, nephew of Waleran.

There is a disused lime kiln in Guist that was built between 1814 and 1846.

In 1929, the whole village was re-built as a model village under the instruction of Sir Thomas Cook MP, the Lord of Sennowe Park.

== Geography ==
According to the 2021 census, Guist has a population of 267 people which shows an increase from the 250 people recorded in the 2011 census.

Guist is located at the junction of the A1067, between Fakenham and Norwich, and the B1110, between Holt and Dereham. The majority of the village is part of the Sennowe Park Estate.

== St. Andrew's Church ==
Guist's parish church is dedicated to Saint Andrew and dates from the Sixteenth Century. St. Andrew's is located within the village on Norwich Road and has been Grade II listed since 1960. The church still holds Sunday services every week and is part of the Heart of Norfolk Benefice.

The chancel of St. Andrew's was rebuilt in the 1880s by Herbert John Green in memory of John Norris Spurgeon who served as Vicar of the parish between 1861 and 1907.

== Governance ==
Guist is part of the electoral ward of Upper Wensum for local elections and is part of the district of Breckland.

The village's national constituency is Mid Norfolk which has been represented by the Conservative's George Freeman MP since 2010.

== War Memorial ==
Guist War Memorial is a stone obelisk with a plinth which lists the following names for the First World War:

Rank	Name	Unit	Date of death	Burial/Commemoration
Cpl.	Charles Tipple	1st Bn., Northamptonshire Regiment	9 May 1915	Le Touret Memorial
LCpl.	Ezra E. Eggleton	23rd (County) Bn., London Regt.	2 Sep. 1918	Heilly Station Cemetery
LCpl.	James F. Pilch	9th Bn., Norfolk Regiment	5 Nov. 1915	Steenvoorde Cemetery
Pte.	James Nobbs	8th Bn., Bedfordshire Regiment	19 Apr. 1917	Loos Memorial
Pte.	Fred Smith	8th Bn., Durham Light Infantry	15 Mar. 1916	Railway Dugouts Cemetery
Pte.	George D. Platten	1st Bn., East Yorkshire Regiment	20 Oct. 1914	Ploegsteert Memorial
Pte.	William R. Palmer	2nd Bn., Middlesex Regiment	27 May 1915	Soissons Memorial
Pte.	George R. Baldwin	7th Bn., Norfolk Regiment	30 Nov. 1917	Cambrai Memorial
Pte.	Charles T. Farrow	7th Bn., Norfolk Regt.	7 Nov. 1915	Étaples Military Cemetery
Pte.	Frederick Nobes	11th Bn., Queen's Royal Regiment	3 May 1918	Südfriedhof
Pte.	Percy Nobes	8th Bn., Worcestershire Regiment	16 Aug. 1917	Tyne Cot
Rfn.	Arthur H. Palmer	11th Bn., Rifle Brigade	30 Nov. 1917	Gouzeaucourt Cemetery

The following names were added after the Second World War:

Rank	Name	Unit	Date of death	Burial/Commemoration
2Lt.	Norman E. Parker	6th Bn., Royal Norfolk Regiment	26 Jan. 1942	Kranji War Memorial
ASn.	Herbert G. Stanley	HMS Keith	1 Jun. 1940	Chatham Naval Memorial
Pte.	Geoffrey A. Turner	1st Bn., South Staffordshire Regiment	19 Apr. 1944	Rangoon Memorial
