= B1110 road =

Road in England

B1110
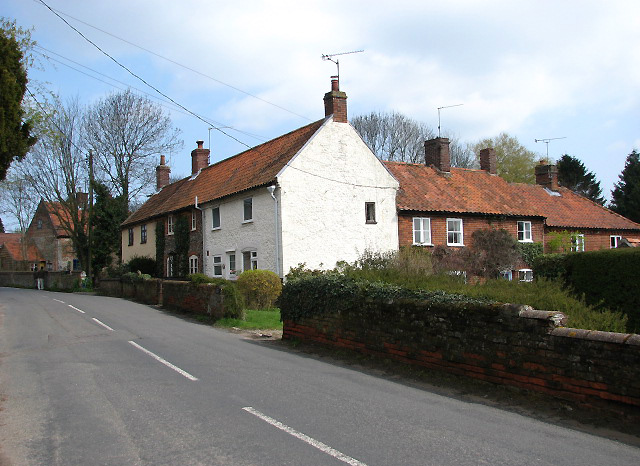
- The B1110 road through the village of Thornage

Route information
- Length: 19 mi (31 km)

Major junctions
- North end: Holt; 52.9028°N 1.0882°E
- A148; B1354; A1067; B1145; B1146
- South end: Dereham; 52.6809°N 1.0361°E

Location
- Country: United Kingdom

Road network
- Roads in the United Kingdom; Motorways; A and B road zones

The B1110 runs for about 19 miles (31 km) between Holt and Dereham, and is entirely within the county of Norfolk. The road is a link between the A148 and the A47 at the town of Dereham.

== History ==
This ancient route predates the Norman Conquest and was used by pilgrims who travelled between the Saxon cathedral, seat of the Bishop of East Anglia, at North Elmham and the abbey at Walsingham and Binham Priory. This ancient road also can be seen very clearly on William Faden's map of Norfolk which was surveyed between 1790 and 1794. This map, the first large-scale map (at one inch to the mile) of the whole county, is a record of the landscape and transport system of the county of Norfolk in late 18th century, and shows that despite the parliamentary enclosure of the early 19th century the route has changed very little. Much of the route on the map is highlighted in a pale pink which marks it out as an important artery of the time.

== Destinations ==
Travelling from north-northeast to south, the road passes through:

- Thornage
- Briningham
- Swanton Novers
- Guist
- Broom Green
- North Elmham
- Dereham
