= Boswell baronets =

Extinct baronetcy in the Baronetage of the United Kingdom

Escutcheon of the Boswell baronets

The Boswell baronetcy, of Auchinleck in the County of Ayr was created for antiquary and songwriter Alexander Boswell in the Baronetage of the United Kingdom on 16 August 1821. The baronetcy became extinct upon the second holder's death in 1857. Sir Alexander was the son of Samuel Johnson's biographer James Boswell.

== Boswell baronets, of Auchinleck (1821) ==
- Sir Alexander Boswell, 1st Baronet (1775–1822)
- Sir James Boswell, 2nd Baronet (1806–1857)

Baronetage of the United Kingdom
| Preceded by Astley baronets | Boswell baronets of Auchinleck; 16 August 1821 | Succeeded by Shaw baronets |
