= Baron Astley (1295) =

Baron Astley (1295) was created by writ of summons dated 23 June 1295 for a family which had lived at Astley, Warwickshire, England since the time of Henry I. Sir Thomas de Astley who was killed in the Battle of Evesham in 1265 married twice. From Sir Thomas's first marriage to Joan de Blois descended the Barons Astley.

- Andrew de Astley, 1st Baron Astley, (1295–1301)
- Nicholas de Astley, 2nd Baron Astley, (1301–c.1315)
  - Sir Giles de Astley, younger brother of Nicholas, (died before 1316)
- Sir Thomas Astley, 3rd Baron Astley, son of Sir Giles, (c.1315–1370)
- William Astley, 4th Baron Astley (1370-1404)

The 4th Baron left an only child and sole heiress Joan Astley, who married Reginald Grey, 3rd Baron Grey de Ruthyn and died in 1448. Their son Edward Grey (who was the second surviving son of his father) married Elizabeth Ferrers, 6th Baroness Ferrers of Groby and Edward was thereby summoned to Parliament as Baron Ferrers of Groby. He died on 18 December 1457. Elizabeth died in 1483.

Whether the Barony of Astley passed to Joan Astley and her son Edward Grey is open to dispute. The Complete Peerage entries on the Thomas Grey, 1st Marquess of Dorset and Thomas Grey, 2nd Marquess of Dorset and on Henry Grey, 1st Duke of Suffolk do not include Baron Astley with their other titles; indeed the last person listed as a holder of the title in the entry on Baron Astley is William Astley, 4th Baron Astley. The entry continues "After his death, the Barony of Astley, if an hereditary Peerage (there being no proof of any sitting) would have devolved on his only da. and h., Joan, and the heirs of her body ... Edward Grey (s. and h. to his mother), who was sum. to Parl, in 1446 as Lord Ferrers of Groby. The Barony of Astley (if then existing) would thenceforth have followed the course of that of Ferrers of Groby, and have been forfeited therewith on the attainder of Henry (Grey), Duke of Suffolk, &c, in 1554." On the other hand, Burke’s Dormant and Extinct Peerages of 1831 and 1978 extend the barony down to 1554 when it would have been forfeited along with all the other titles of the Duke of Suffolk following participation in Wyatt's Rebellion and his attainder and execution. This gives the following descent:

- Joan Astley, 5th Baroness Astley (died 1448)
- Sir Edward Grey, 5th Baron Astley (son of the previous)(died 18 December 1457);
- Sir John Grey of Groby, 6th Baron Astley (son of the previous)(died 17 February 1461)(died before his mother, so was never Baron Ferrers of Groby)
- Thomas Grey, 1st Marquess of Dorset, 7th Baron Astley, 7th Baron Ferrers of Groby (son of the previous)(died 20 September 1501)
- Thomas Grey, 2nd Marquess of Dorset, 8th Baron Astley (son of the previous)(died 10 October 1530) and his son:,
- Henry Grey, 1st Duke of Suffolk, 9th Baron Astley (executed 23 February 1554)

== See also ==
- Baron Astley of Reading
- Baron Astley (disambiguation)
- Astley baronets
- Baron Hastings
