= Roger Townshend (Norfolk MP, died 1709) =

British Army officer and Whig politician

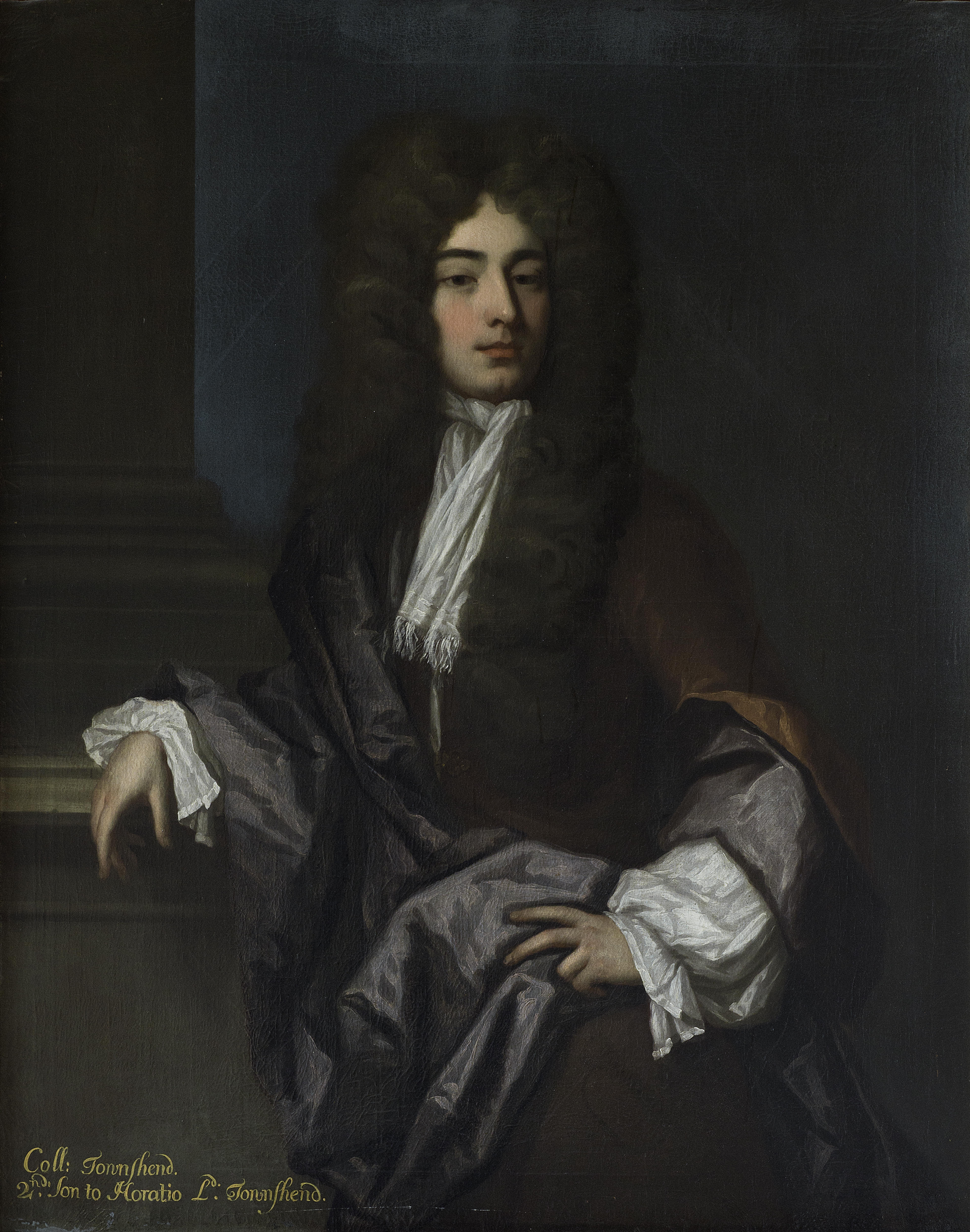
- portrait by Michael Dahl
- Born: 1677
- Died: 22 May 1709 (aged 31–32)
- Alma mater: Eton College; King's College
- Occupation: Politician
- Parent(s): Horatio Townshend, 1st Viscount Townshend; Mary Ashe
- Position held: Member of the 1701-02 Parliament, Member of the 1705-07 Parliament

Roger Townshend (after 1675 – 22 May 1709) was a British Army officer and Whig politician who sat in the English and British House of Commons between 1701 and 1709.

== Early life ==
Townshend was the son of Horatio Townshend, 1st Viscount Townshend, of Raynham Hall, and his second wife Mary Ashe, daughter of Sir Joseph Ashe, 1st Baronet, of Twickenham, Middlesex. He was educated at Eton College from about 1688 to 1695 and matriculated from King's College, Cambridge at Easter 1695.

== Career ==
Townshend was returned as Member of Parliament for Norfolk at the two general elections of 1701 on the interest of his elder brother Charles Townshend, 2nd Viscount Townshend. Before the 1702 English general election, he fell out with his fellow member, Sir John Holland, Bt, and refused to stand. He was subsequently appointed Deputy Lieutenant. At the 1705 English general election, he agreed to stand with Holland again and was returned as Whig MP. He supported the Court candidate for Speaker on 25 October 1705, and voted with the Court over the regency bill on 18 February 1706.

On 12 April 1706 he was appointed colonel for life of a regiment of Foot which had been raised to fight in Spain. He was not then sent abroad and in Parliament was nominated to the committee to draft a bill to regulate rates for importing coal into Great Yarmouth. He suffered from ill=health and after receiving treatment at Ghent in October 1707, narrowly escaped drowning when the ship he was returning on foundered in bad weather.

At the 1708 British general election Townshend refused to stand for Norfolk, but was returned by his brother as Whig MP for Great Yarmouth. In August 1708, he was embarked with his regiment but applied for leave to resign his commission if he was ordered to Portugal, In the event the regiment was sent to Flanders instead. In 1709 he voted in Parliament for the naturalization of the Palatines in 1709.

== Death and legacy ==
Townshend died unmarried on 22 May 1709 at Bath, where he was being treated for his health, and was buried at Raynham.

Parliament of England
Preceded by Sir William Cook, Bt; Sir Jacob Astley, Bt	Member of Parliament for Norfolk; 1701–1702; With: Sir Jacob Astley, Bt; Sir John Holland, Bt	Succeeded by Sir Jacob Astley, Bt; Sir John Holland, Bt
Preceded by Sir Jacob Astley, Bt; Sir John Holland, Bt	Member of Parliament for Norfolk; 1705–1707; With: Sir John Holland, Bt	Succeeded by Parliament of Great Britain
Parliament of Great Britain
Preceded by Parliament of England	Member of Parliament for Norfolk; 1707–1708; With: Sir John Holland, Bt	Succeeded by Ashe Windham; Sir John Holland, Bt
Preceded by Benjamin England; John Nicholson	Member of Parliament for Great Yarmouth; 1708–1709; With: Richard Ferrier	Succeeded by Nathaniel Symonds; Richard Ferrier
