= Pocock baronets =

Extinct baronetcy in the Baronetage of the United Kingdom

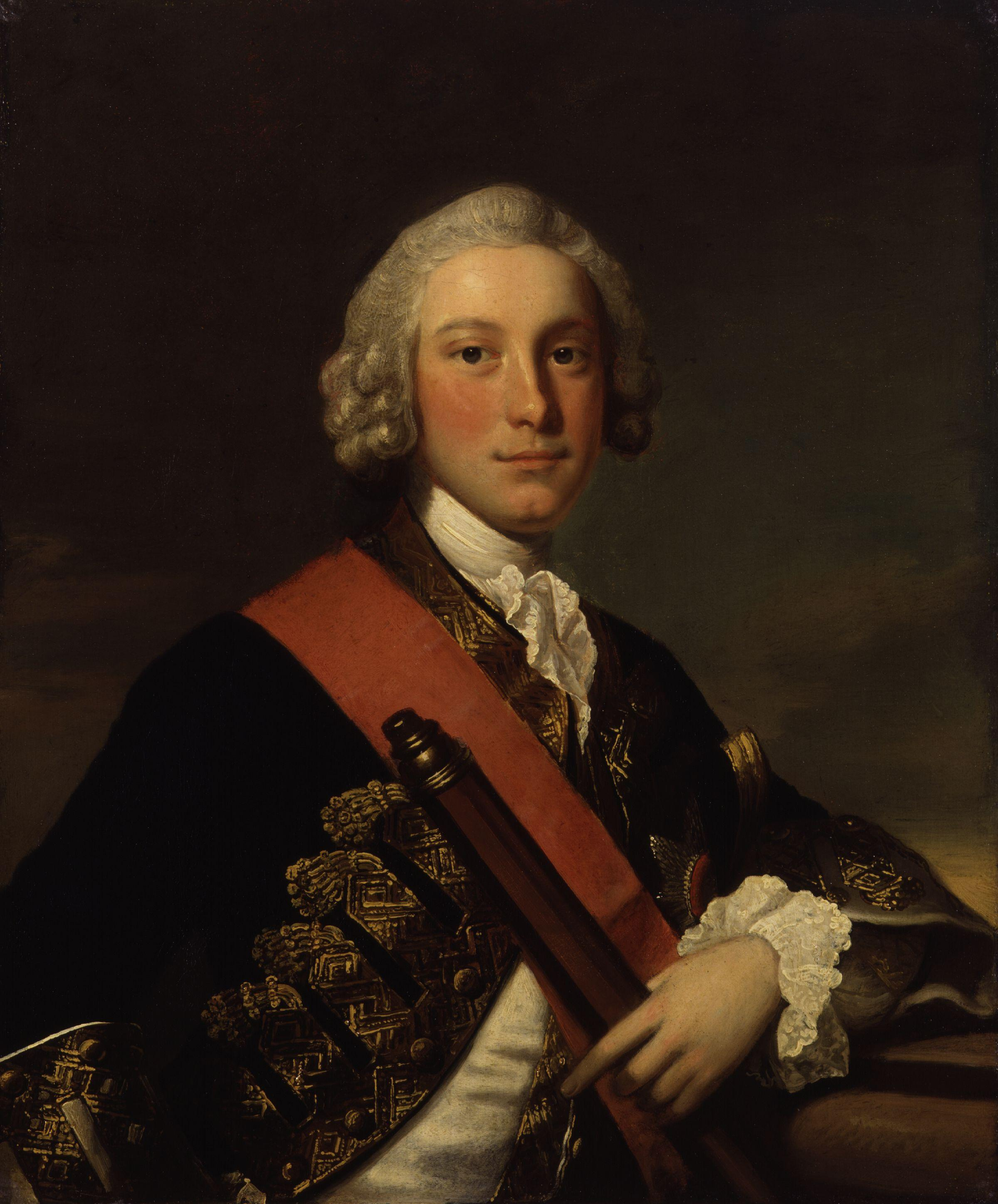
Vice-Admiral Sir George Pocock, ancestor of the Pocock Baronets

The Pocock Baronetcy, of Hart in the County Palatine of Durham and of Twickenham in the County of Middlesex, was a title in the Baronetage of the United Kingdom. It was created on 18 August 1821 for George Pocock, Member of Parliament for Bridgwater. He was the son of Admiral Sir George Pocock. The title became extinct on the death of the 4th Baronet in 1921.

== Pocock baronets, of Hart and Twickenham (1821) ==
- Sir George Pocock, 1st Baronet (1765–1840)
- Sir George Edward Pocock, 2nd Baronet (1792–1866)
- Sir George Francis Coventry Pocock, 3rd Baronet (1830–1915)
- Sir Charles Guy Coventry Pocock, 4th Baronet (1863–1921)

Baronetage of the United Kingdom
| Preceded by Shaw baronets | Pocock baronets of Bushy Park; 18 August 1821 | Succeeded by Jolliffe baronets |
