= Bintry Watermill =

Watermill in Norfolk, England

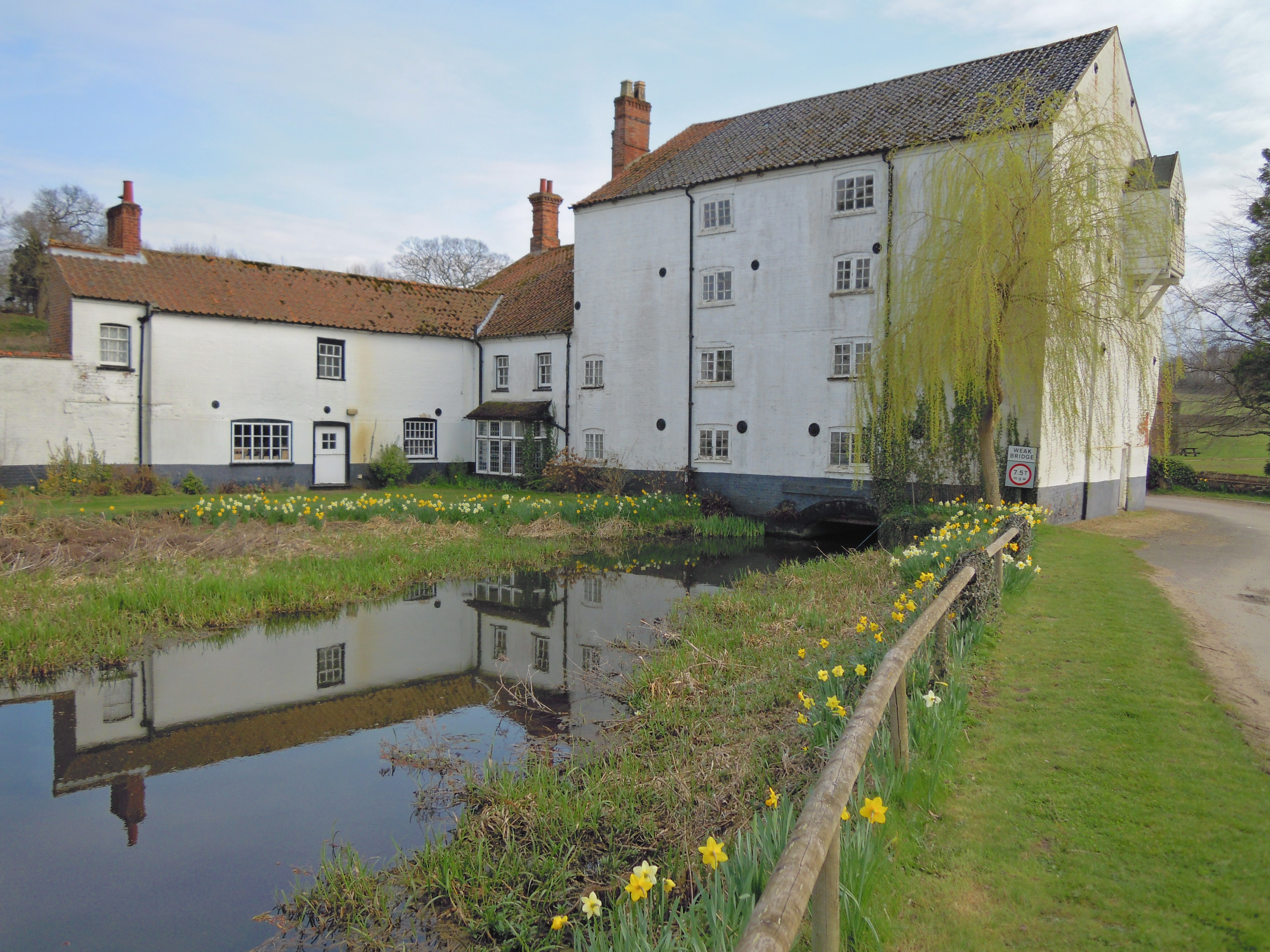
- Bintry Watermill, north-west elevation

- Location of Bintry Watermill within North Norfolk

General information
- Type: Watermill
- Location: River Wensum, Bintree, England
- Coordinates: 52°46′43″N 0°57′43″E
- Opened: Present mill circa 1750
- Owner: Private

Technical details
- Material: Norfolk red brick with a black pantile roof

Bintry Watermill is a historic watermill located on the River Wensum, approximately one mile (2 km) west of the village of Bintree in the English county of Norfolk. A watermill has likely occupied this site since 1454. The current structure is believed to have been constructed in the 1750s.

== Description ==
The present building is constructed from red Norfolk brick, rising four storeys high with a three-bay design on the south-west elevation. The north-west elevation features two columns of windows. The lower two storeys of the mill date back to the 18th century, while the top floor was added in the 19th century. At the western end of the mill, there is a timber lucam (a covered sack hoist) built with shiplap construction. Although the wheelrace still runs beneath the mill, the waterwheel was removed in 1947 to create additional space for electrically powered machinery. Across the road stands a bridge with a dentilled cornice, from which the wheelrace once discharged back into the river. The corner of the building is cut away to accommodate the curve of the road around the gable.

=== Miller's cottage ===
Attached to the east side of the mill is the miller's cottage, which features a chequered-patterned brick gable end. The cottage includes a Georgian doorcase. In the 19th century, the roof was raised to incorporate two dormer windows.

== Film set ==
In 1996, the watermill at Bintry was used by the BBC as a filming location for their adaptation of George Eliot’s The Mill on the Floss, which aired on 1 January 1997. The adaptation starred Emily Watson as Maggie Tulliver and Bernard Hill as Mr. Tulliver. Additionally, the mill served as the location for the 1989 filming of the Campion episode "Sweet Danger."
