= Simon Taylor (MP) =

English Tory MP for King's Lynn

Sir Simon Taylor (c. 1633 – 25 December 1689) was an English wine merchant and Tory politician.

== Biography ==
Taylor was born in King's Lynn, Norfolk, the eldest surviving son of Simon Taylor and Susan Greene. In 1657 he became a freeman of Lynn and in 1660 he was made an alderman. In 1675 he served as the town's mayor. As a wine merchant, he specialised in the growing port trade and built a large house with capacious cellars in Wyndgate, now Queen Street. He also purchased the manor of Shingham, 15 miles outside Lynn.

Taylor first stood for election for the King's Lynn constituency in 1673, but was defeated by Francis North by 100 votes. In February 1675 he was defeated a second time, this time by Robert Coke, after a protracted and very expensive contest.

In the 1679 election, Taylor was successfully elected to the House of Commons of England as a Member of Parliament for King's Lynn and continued to represent the seat until his death. He voted for the first Exclusion Bill, but by November 1680 he was firmly aligned with the Court faction. Taylor was knighted at Windsor Castle by Charles II in 1684. He supported the repeal of the Test Acts and in June 1688 he was recommended as a court candidate for Lynn in support of James II.

On 29 March 1660 he married Mary, daughter of Samuel Baron, with whom he had two sons and a daughter. He died on 25 December 1689, aged 56, and was buried in St Margaret's, Lynn.

Parliament of England
Preceded by Robert Coke; Robert Wright	Member of Parliament for King's Lynn; 1679–1689; With: John Turner (1679–1681); Sir Henry Hobart, Bt (1681–1685); Sir John Turner (1685–1689)	Succeeded by Sir John Turner; Sigismund Trafford
