= Thomas Browne (Master of Christ's College, Cambridge) =

Thomas Browne (1766–1832) was a priest and academic in the late eighteenth and early nineteenth centuries.

Browne was born in Poulton-le-Fylde. He was educated at Christ's College, Cambridge, graduating BA in 1786; MA in 1789; and BD in 1796. He became Fellow in 1791; and was Master from 1808 to 1814. He held livings at Little Snoring, Seaton Ross, Bere Ferrers, Bourn, and Gorleston.

Browne married Lucy, a daughter of John Astley, and as a result was presented to the benefice of Gorleston in Norfolk.

Browne was the author of The Union Dictionary (1800)

== Works ==
- A New Classical Dictionary, for the use of Schools, Containing under its Different Heads, Every thing Illustrative and Explanatory of the Mythology, History, Geography, Manners, Customs, etc. Occurring in the Greek and Roman Authors, ... London: Printed for G. G. and J. Robinson, 1797. Internet Archive
- The Union Dictionary, Containing all that is truly useful in the Dictionaries of Johnson, Sheridan, and Walker, the Orthography and Explanatory Matter Selected from Dr. Johnson, The Pronunciation Adjusted According to Mr. Walker, with the addition of Mr. Sheridan's Pronunciation ... (A-Z). London: Printed ... for G. Wilkie et al., 1800. Internet Archive
- An Examination of the Calumnies which have been Assigned as Reasons for the Opposition to Dr. Browne's Election into the Office of Vice-Chancellor, which took place on 4th of November, 1809. ... Cambridge, UK: Printed by W. Metcalfe for the author, 1810. Internet Archive
- A Dictionary of Ancient Classical and Scriptural Proper Names: in which will be found A Correct Epitome of the History, Biography, and Religion ... Burlington, New Jersey, USA: David Allinson & Co., 1812. Internet Archive HathiTrust
