= The Mill on the Floss =

1860 novel by George Eliot

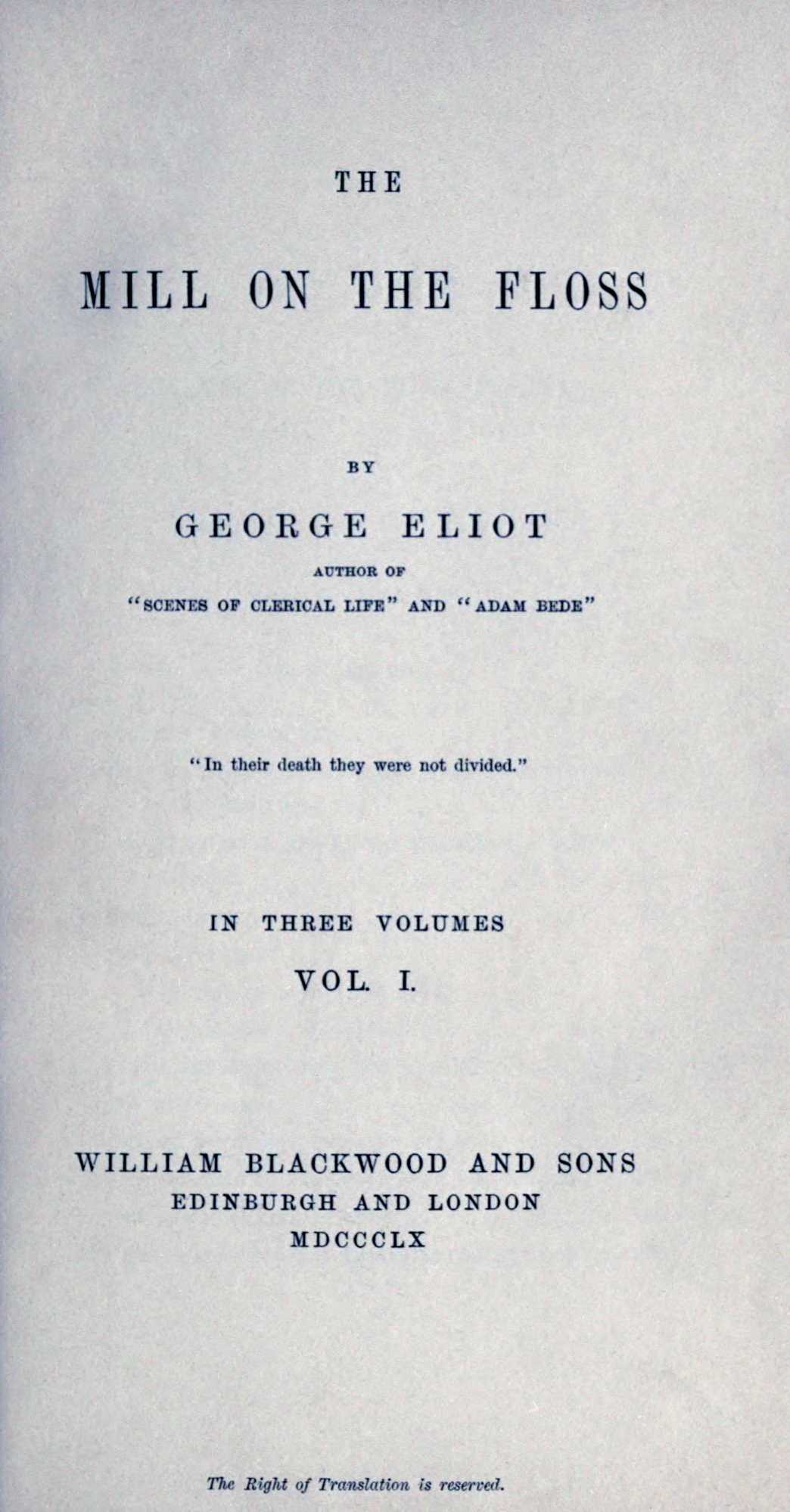
- Title page of the first edition, 1860
- Author: George Eliot
- Language: English
- Genre: Novel; Psychological fiction Domestic fiction
- Set in: Lincolnshire, c. 1829–1840
- Publisher: William Blackwood and Sons, Edinburgh and London
- Publication date: 4 April 1860
- Publication place: United Kingdom
- Media type: Print (hardback & paperback): octavo
- Pages: 993, in three volumes
- Dewey Decimal: 823.8
- LC Class: PR4664 .A1 1979
- Preceded by: Adam Bede
- Followed by: Silas Marner
- Text: The Mill on the Floss at Wikisource

The Mill on the Floss is a novel by English author George Eliot, pen name of Mary Ann Evans, first published in three volumes on 4 April 1860 by William Blackwood and Sons. The first American edition was published, in the same year, by Harper & Brothers, New York.

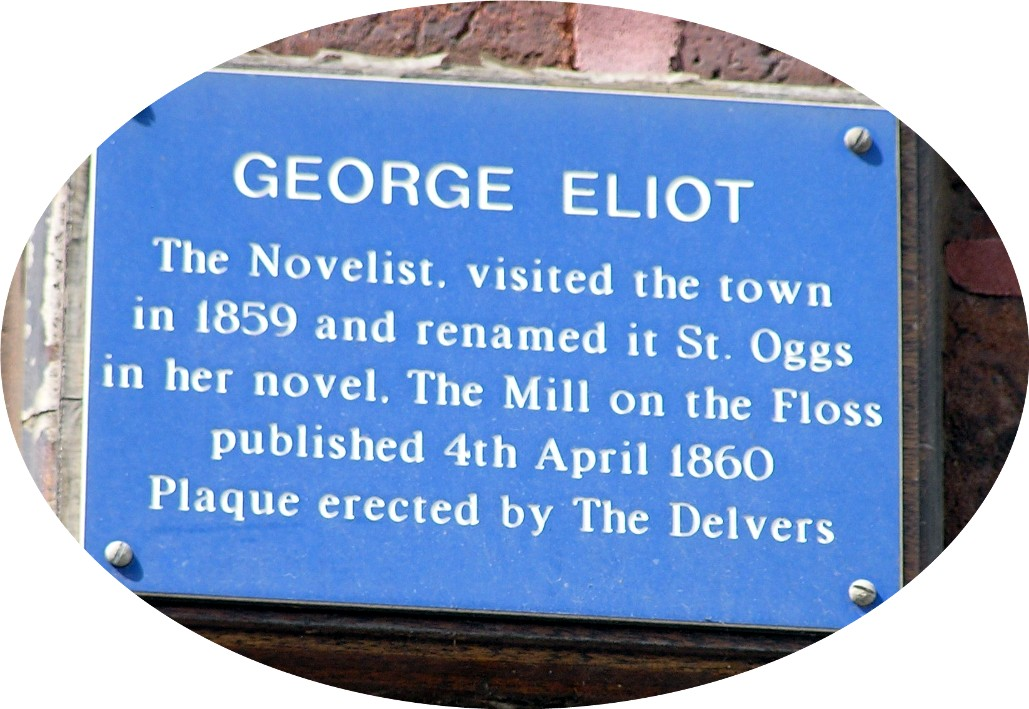
Plaque in Gainsborough, Lincolnshire, noting it as the model for St Ogg's: "one of those old, old towns which impress one as a continuation and outgrowth of nature, as much as the nests of the bower-birds or the winding galleries of the white ants; a town which carries the traces of its long growth and history like a millennial tree, and has sprung up and developed in the same spot between the river and the low hill from the time when the Roman legions turned their backs on it from the camp on the hillside, and the long-haired sea-kings came up the river and looked with fierce, eager eyes at the fatness of the land."

Spanning a period of 10 to 15 years, the novel details the lives of Tom and Maggie Tulliver, siblings who grow up at Dorlcote Mill on the River Floss. The mill is at the confluence of the Floss and the smaller River Ripple, near the village of St Ogg's in Lincolnshire, England. Both the rivers and the village are fictional.

== Synopsis ==
The novel begins in the late 1820s or early 1830s – several historical references place the events in the book after the Napoleonic Wars but before the Reform Act 1832. (In chapter 3, the character Mr Riley is described as an "auctioneer and appraiser thirty years ago", placing the opening events of the novel in approximately 1829, thirty years before the novel's composition in 1859. In chapter 8, Mr Tulliver and Mr Deane discuss the Duke of Wellington and his "conduct in the Catholic Question", a conversation that could only take place after 1828, when Wellington became Prime Minister and supported a bill for Catholic Emancipation). The novel includes many autobiographical elements and reflects the disgrace that author Mary Ann Evans experienced while in a lengthy relationship with a married man, George Henry Lewes.

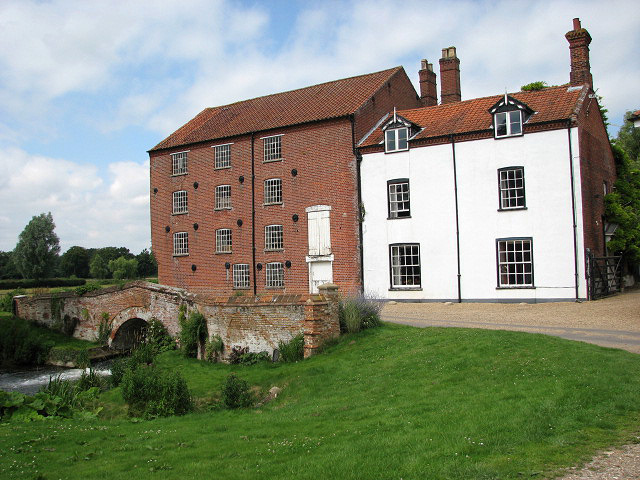
Bintry Watermill, which depicted Dorlcote Mill in the 1997 TV series.

Maggie Tulliver is the protagonist, and the story begins when she is 9 years old, 13 years into her parents' marriage. Her relationship with her older brother, Tom, and her romantic relationships with Philip Wakem (a hunchbacked, sensitive and intellectual friend) and with Stephen Guest (a vivacious young socialite in St Ogg's and assumed fiancé of Maggie's cousin Lucy Deane) constitute the most significant narrative threads.

Tom and Maggie have a close yet complex bond, which continues throughout the novel. Their relationship is coloured by Maggie's desire to recapture the unconditional love of her father before his death. Tom's pragmatic and reserved nature clashes with Maggie's idealism and fervor for intellectual gains and experience. Various family crises, including bankruptcy, Mr Tulliver's rancorous relationship with Philip Wakem's father, which results in the loss of the mill and Mr Tulliver's death, intensify Tom's and Maggie's differences and highlight their love for each other. To help his father repay his debts, Tom leaves school to devote himself to a life of business. He eventually finds a measure of success, restoring the family's former estate. Maggie languishes in the impoverished Tulliver home, her intellectual aptitude wasted in her socially isolated state. She passes through a period of tough spirituality, during which she renounces the world, motivated by her reading of Thomas à Kempis's The Imitation of Christ.

This renunciation is tested by a renewed friendship with Philip Wakem, with whom she had developed a friendship while he and Tom were students. Against the wishes of Tom and her father - who both despise the Wakems - Maggie secretly meets Philip and they go for long walks through the woods. The relationship they forge is founded partly in Maggie's heartfelt pity for broken and neglected human beings but it also serves as an outlet for her intellectual romantic desires. Philip's and Maggie's attraction is, in any case, inconsequential because of the family antipathy. Philip manages to coax a pledge of love from Maggie. When Tom discovers the relationship between the two, he forces his sister to renounce Philip and with him her hopes of experiencing the broader, more cultured world he represents.

Several years pass, during which Mr Tulliver dies. Lucy Deane invites Maggie to come and stay with her and experience the life of cultured leisure that she enjoys. This includes long hours conversing and playing music with Lucy's suitor, Stephen Guest, a prominent St Ogg's resident. Stephen and Maggie, against their rational judgments, become attracted to each other. The complication is compounded by Philip Wakem's friendship with Lucy and Stephen; he and Maggie are reintroduced and Philip's love for her is rekindled, while Maggie, no longer isolated, enjoys the clandestine attentions of Stephen Guest, putting her past profession of love for Philip in question. Lucy intrigues to throw Philip and Maggie together on a short rowing trip down the Floss but Stephen unwittingly takes a sick Philip's place.

When Maggie and Stephen find themselves floating down the river, negligent of the distance they have covered, he proposes that they board a passing boat to the next substantial city, Mudport and get married. Maggie is too tired to argue about it. Stephen takes advantage of her weariness and hails the boat. They are taken on board and during the trip to Mudport, Maggie struggles between her love for Stephen and her duties to Philip and Lucy, which were established when she was poor, isolated and dependent on them for what good her life contained. Upon arrival in Mudport, she rejects Stephen and makes her way back to St Ogg's, where she lives for a brief period as an outcast, Stephen having fled to Holland. Although she immediately goes to Tom for forgiveness and shelter, he sends her away, telling her that she will never again be welcome under his roof. Lucy and Philip forgive her, in a moving reunion and in an eloquent letter, respectively.

Maggie's brief exile ends when the river floods. Having struggled through the waters in a boat to find Tom at the old mill, she sets out with him to rescue Lucy Deane and her family. In a brief tender moment, the brother and sister are reconciled from all past differences. When their boat capsizes, the two drown in an embrace.

== Characters ==
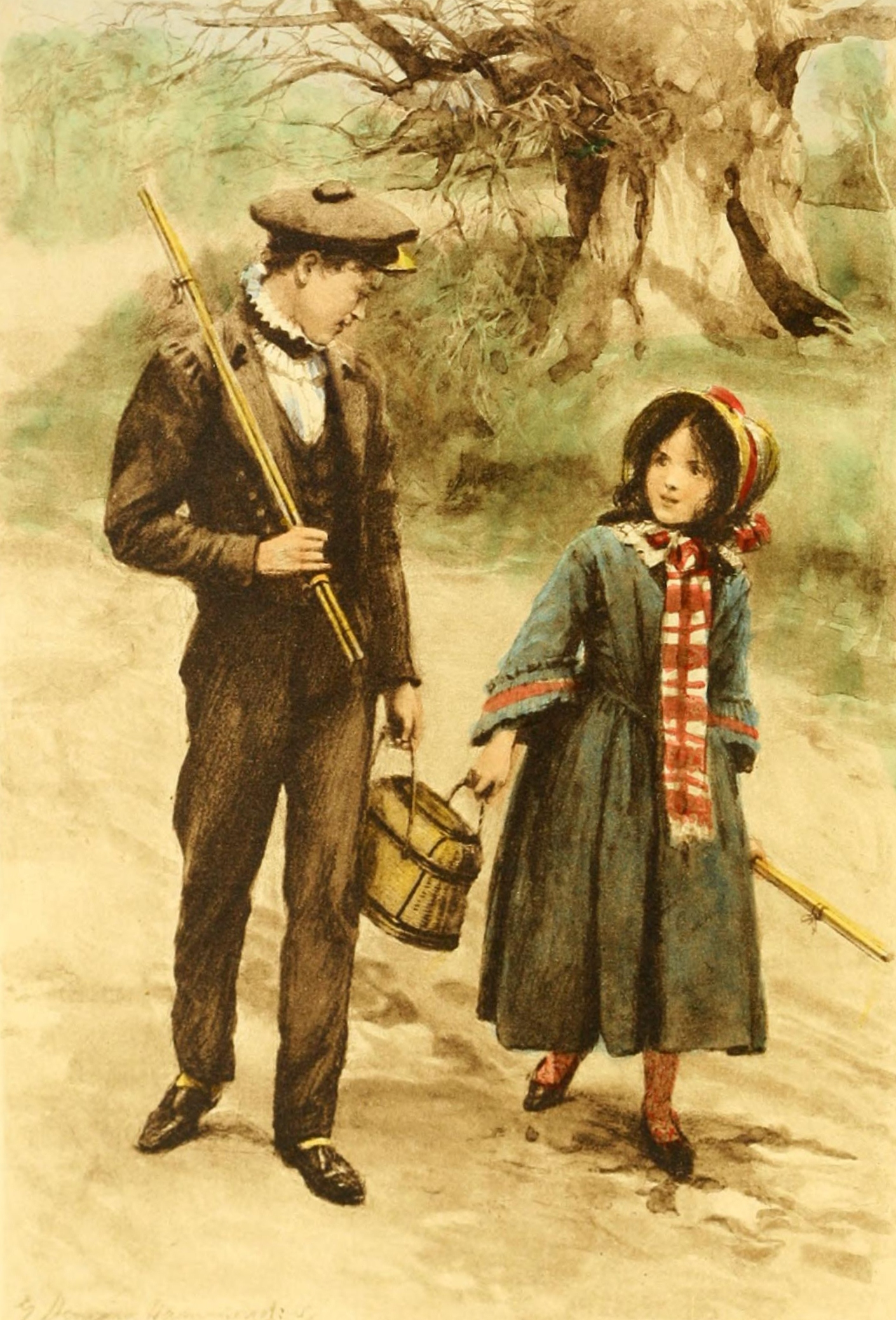
Tom and Maggie Tulliver

- Maggie Tulliver – a dark-complexioned miller's daughter. A clever and impetuous child who feels deep passions, but forces herself to suppress them for the good of others.
- Tom Tulliver – Maggie's brother. Originally lives in a careless fashion and neglects his studies, but begins to work seriously after his father's downfall.
- Bessy Tulliver (née Dodson) – Maggie and Tom's mother, a simple and dim-witted woman who feels her social decline. She "obsesses about her linen cupboard, her prized silver sugar tongs and her sister's expensive new hat".
- Edward Tulliver – Maggie and Tom's father, owner of the Mill until a lengthy lawsuit leaves him in dire financial straits. A proud and rash man who struggles to adapt to the modern commercial world. Feels deep love for Maggie especially, and for his own sister "Gritty". Characterized by his strong sense of justice and determination to secure a prosperous future for his family.
- Philip Wakem – hunchbacked classmate of Tom and friend/suitor to Maggie
- Stephen Guest – affluent suitor to Lucy, who also has eyes for Maggie

=== Minor characters ===
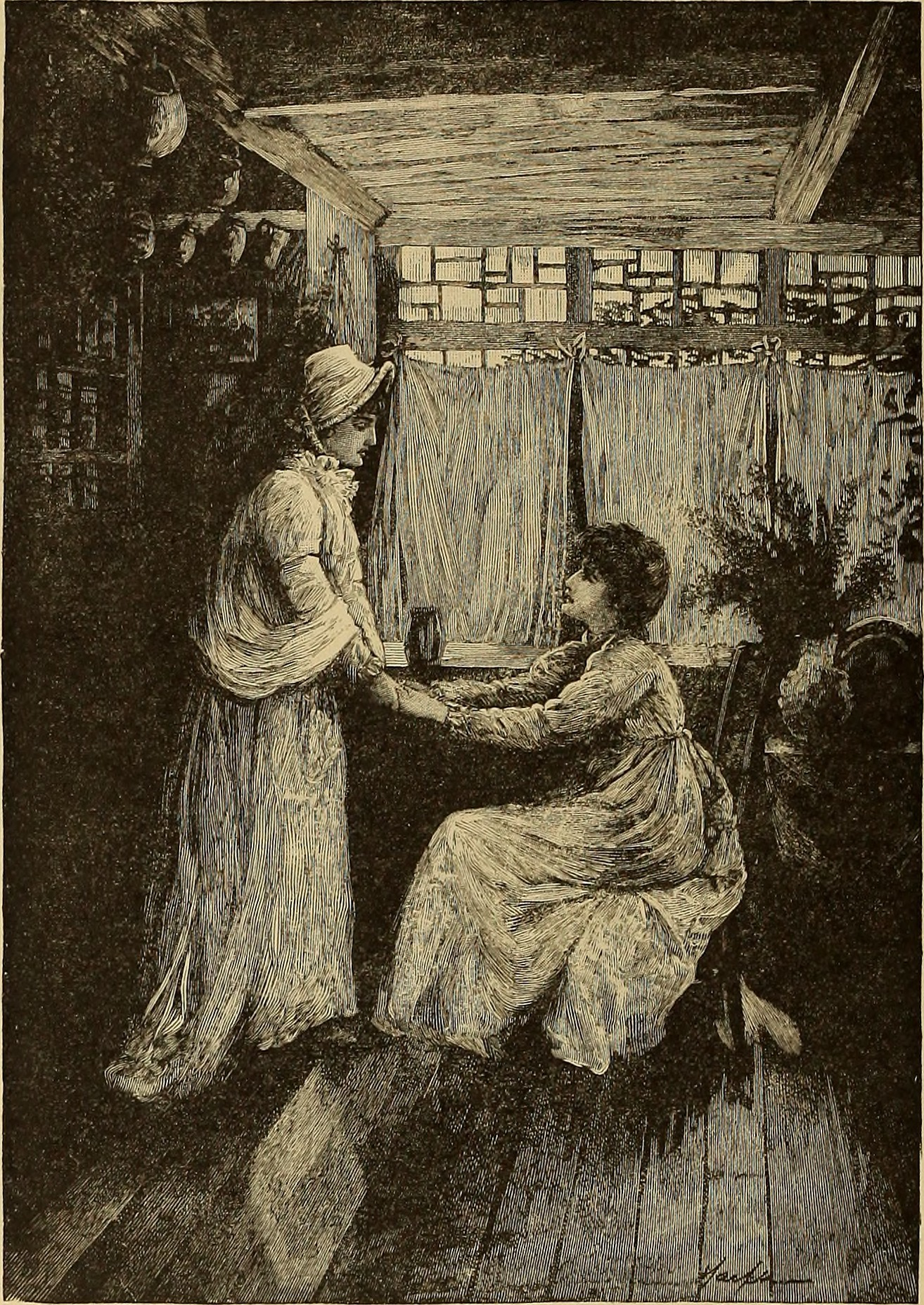
Reunion of Maggie and Lucy (W. St. John Harper, 1889)

- John Wakem – St Ogg's lawyer and father of Philip. Mr Tulliver considers all lawyers to be creations of Old Harry (the Devil) but is particularly disdainful of Wakem after losing a costly lawsuit to him.
- Emily Wakem (née Clint) – mother of Philip, dies before the events of the book
- Lucy Deane – Tom and Maggie's cousin, a pretty, fair-haired girl, presumed to be betrothed to Stephen Guest
- Miss Guest and Laura Guest – sisters to Stephen, figures in local society and friends to Lucy
- Mr Riley – auctioneer and appraiser, a friend of Mr Tulliver
- Rev. Walter Stelling – teacher of Tom and Phillip
- Dr Kenn – the clergyman of St Ogg's
- Bob Jakin – a childhood friend of Tom who later helps Tom in business; both Tom and Maggie stay at his house at different times
- Mrs Jane Glegg (née Dodson) – leader of the Dodson clan, critical and dominating aunt of Maggie and Tom who stands up for Maggie after her scandal with Stephen
- Mrs Sophy Pullet (née Dodson) – sister of Bessy, Tom and Maggie's aunt
- Mrs Susan Deane (née Dodson) – sister of Bessy, Tom and Maggie's aunt, mother to Lucy
- Gritty Moss (née Tulliver) – Mr Tulliver's sister, mother of many children, including Georgy and Lizzy
- Kezia – Tulliver family maid
- Luke – the head miller
- Yap – the Tullivers' dog
- Mr Turnbull - doctor of the parish

== Locations ==
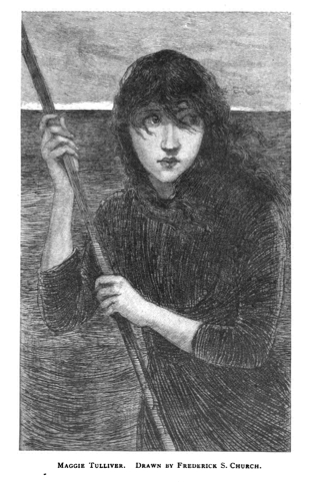
Maggie Tulliver, by Frederick Stuart Church

- Dorlcote Mill – the Tulliver family's home for a century
- Basset – home of Moss Farm
- Dunlow Common
- Garum Firs – visited for a treat
- Red Deeps
- Midsummer – home of the academy
- Mudport
- St Ogg's
- St Ursula

== Themes ==
Like other novels by George Eliot, The Mill on the Floss articulates the tension between circumstances and the spiritual energies of individual characters struggling against those circumstances. A certain determinism is at play throughout the novel, from Mr Tulliver's inability to keep himself from "going to law", and thereby losing his patrimony and bankrupting his family, to the series of events that sets Maggie and Stephen down the river and past the point of no return. Characters such as Mr Tulliver are presented as unable to determine their own course rationally, while various external forces, be it the drift of the river or the force of a flood, are presented as determining the courses of people for them. On the other hand, Maggie's ultimate choice not to marry Stephen, and to suffer both the privation of his love and the ignominy of their botched elopement demonstrates a final triumph of free will.

Critics have asserted that Maggie's need for love and acceptance is her underlying motivation throughout The Mill on the Floss, claiming that the conflicts that arise in the novel stem from her frustrated attempts at gaining this acceptance. Alan Bellringer has claimed that "[t]he two main themes of the novel, growing up and falling in love, lend themselves to amusement, but it is stunted growth and frustrated love that are emphasized." Commentators have often focused on the constant rejection of Maggie's talents and mannerisms by her family and society. Even the cultural norms of her community deny her intellectual and spiritual growth. According to Elizabeth Ermarth, "[t]hey are norms according to which she is an inferior, dependent creature who will never go far in anything, and which consequently are a denial of her full humanity."

== Adaptations ==
The story was adapted as a film, The Mill on the Floss, in 1937, and as a BBC series in 1978 starring Christopher Blake, Pippa Guard, Judy Cornwell, Ray Smith and Anton Lesser.

A radio dramatisation in five one-hour parts was broadcast on BBC7 in April 1991. It starred Terry Molloy and Sylvestra Le Touzel.

In 1994, Helen Edmundson adapted the book for the stage, in a production performed by Shared Experience.

A television film adaptation of the novel was first aired on 1 January 1997. Maggie Tulliver is portrayed by Emily Watson and Mr Tulliver by Bernard Hill. The production was filmed at the historic Chatham Dockyard in Kent for exterior street scenes.

== Bibliography ==
- Eliot, George. The Mill on the Floss. OL 20938W (many editions, via the OpenLibrary)
- Eliot, George. The Mill on the Floss/The Mill on the Floss free PDF of Blackwood's 1878 Cabinet Edition (the critical standard with Eliot's final corrections) at the George Eliot Archive
