= Sir William Cook, 2nd Baronet =

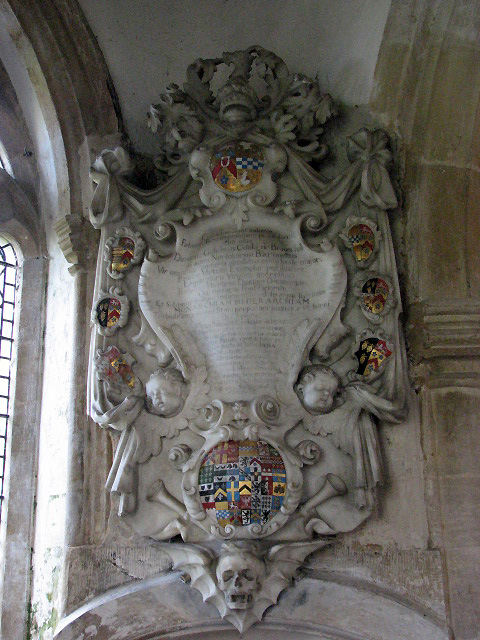
Mural monument to Sir William Cook, 2nd Baronet, in St Mary's Church, Cranworth, Norfolk

Arms of Cooke Baronets of Broome Hall in Norfolk (Cooke of Linstead, Suffolk) Or, a chevron engrailed gules between three cinquefoils azure on a chief of the second a lion passant argent

Sir William Cook, 2nd Baronet (c. 1630 – January 1708), of Broome Hall in Norfolk, was a member of the East Anglian gentry and a Tory Member of Parliament.

== Origins ==
He was only son and heir of Sir William Cook, 1st Baronet (died 1681), of Broome Hall, by his first wife Mary Astley, a daughter of Thomas Astley of Melton Constable in Norfolk. His grandfather had acquired Broome Hall by marriage in 1603. The Cooke family had been seated at Linstead in Suffolk since the 15th century. The 1st Baronet remained neutral in the English Civil War, though he did sign the Norfolk address to General George Monck for a free parliament in 1660 and was made a baronet three years later.

== Career ==
He attended Emmanuel College, Cambridge from 1647 and received legal training at Gray's Inn from 1648 and was noted as "very well versed in every kind of learning, but especially distinguished by the suavity of his manners". He was a justice of the peace for Norfolk from 1660 to 1668 and a captain in the militia from around October 1660 to 1679 or possibly later. He became a commissioner for assessment Norfolk in 1661 and for Suffolk in 1679, holding both posts until 1680. In 1675 he was made commissioner for recusants in Norfolk. He had become deputy lieutenant of Norfolk by 1676 and in 1681 he succeeded to his father's baronetcy. The 1677 session of parliament began to show fracture lines between Charles II's court and Parliament. Cook supported Robert Paston in backing the former, making him a potential pro-Crown candidate in the 1679 and 1681 elections. Cook did finally stand in 1685 for Great Yarmouth (a pocket borough controlled by the Pastons) and won one of its two seats - in the same year he was made a freeman of Great Yarmouth. However, soon afterwards he wrote to William Sancroft, Archbishop of Canterbury:

[I feel myself] very incompetent for so great a trust in this critical juncture. There is nothing can sweeten this service but the thoughts of Lambeth being so near Westminster and the pleasure I shall receive by waiting on your grace will smooth the roughness of that province which is put upon me. It would still add to my happiness if I might (without offence) beg the care of one of your grace’s servants to procure me a small quiet lodging on Lambeth side of the river with a bed in some near chamber for my servant, and what is ordinary in the kind will suit well with my circumstances, which highly incite me to frugality and to wish for a short but happy Parliament.

He was appointed to nine minor committees during James II's single Parliament - he was the first man appointed to the committee for the bill for the renewal of the Yarmouth Harbour Act, meaning it was probably he who had introduced it. In 1688 he agreed that some of the laws penalising Roman Catholics and non-conformists might "require a review and amendment" but refused to agree to the abolition of the Test Acts. He was thus removed from his deputy lieutenancy and all other local office in February 1688 and in October that year refused to sit on the bench alongside Roman Catholics. In the post-Glorious Revolution elections of 1689 he was returned for Norfolk and also sat for the county in 1690 and 1698.

When the House of Commons had to vote on the House of Lords' motion that the throne was not vacant (due to its being occupied by William III and Mary II), Cook voted in agreement. After brief sick leave early in 1690, he returned to Westminster and sat on twenty committees in the Convention Parliament, including ones to repeal the Corporation Act 1661, to inquire into the fall in rents, to adopt new oaths of supremacy and allegiance and to consider abolishing the hearth tax. He also helped consider a bill for bringing in tithes more efficiently and later committees to inquire into disasters during the war and to limit spending in elections. He had to sell Broome Hall and is buried in St Mary's Church, Cranworth, in Norfolk, where survives his mural monument displaying eight heraldic shields and an epitaph which describes him as a defender of monarchy "equally unaffected by the wicked artifices of rabid Papists and schismatics". In the absence of any sons or brothers, the baronetcy became extinct on his death.

== Marriage ==
In 1664 (date of marriage settlement) he married his step-sister Jane Stewart (died 1698), a daughter of William Stewart of Wisbech in Cambridgeshire and of Barton Mills, by his wife Mary Greenwood (d.1686) (a daughter of William Greenwood of Burgh Castle in Suffolk) (whose inscribed ledger stone survives in Broome Church), the second wife of the 1st Baronet. By his wife he had seven daughters but no son.

Parliament of England
| Preceded by George England; Sir James Johnson | Member of Parliament for Great Yarmouth; 1685–1689; With: John Friend | Succeeded by George England; Samuel Fuller |
| Preceded by Sir Thomas Hare, Bt. Sir Jacob Astley, Bt. | Member of Parliament for Norfolk; 1689–1695; With: Sir Henry Hobart, Bt. (to 1690); Sir Jacob Astley, Bt. (from 1690) | Succeeded by Sir Henry Hobart, Bt. Sir Jacob Astley, Bt. |
| Preceded by Sir Henry Hobart, Bt. Sir Jacob Astley, Bt. | Member of Parliament for Norfolk; 1690–1700; With: Sir Jacob Astley, Bt. | Succeeded by Roger Townshend; Sir Jacob Astley, Bt. |
Baronetage of England
| Preceded by William Cook | Baronet (of Broome Hall); 1681–1708 | Extinct |
