= Shaw baronets of Bushy Park (1821) =

Escutcheon of the Shaw baronets of Bushy Park

The Shaw baronetcy, of Bushy Park in the County of Dublin, was created in the Baronetage of the United Kingdom on 17 August 1821 for the Tory politician Robert Shaw. The 3rd Baronet was also a politician.

== Shaw baronets, of Bushy Park (1821) ==
- Sir Robert Shaw, 1st Baronet (1774–1849)
- Sir Robert Shaw, 2nd Baronet (1796–1869)
- Sir Frederick Shaw, 3rd Baronet (1799–1876)
- Sir Robert Shaw, 4th Baronet (1821–1895)
- Sir Frederick William Shaw, DSO, 5th Baronet (1858–1927)
- Sir Robert de Vere Shaw, MC and Bar, 6th Baronet (1890–1969)
- Sir Robert Shaw, 7th Baronet (1925–2002)
- Sir Charles de Vere Shaw, 8th Baronet (born 1957).

The heir apparent to the baronetcy is Robert Jonathan De Vere Shaw (born 1988), only son of the 8th Baronet.

== Extended family ==
George Shaw (1822–1892), second son of the 3rd Baronet, was a Major-General in the British Army.

== Notes ==
Baronetage of the United Kingdom
Preceded by Boswell baronets	Shaw baronets of Bushy Park; 17 August 1821	Succeeded by Pocock baronets
