= Sir Henry Hobart, 4th Baronet =

English politician (1657–1698)

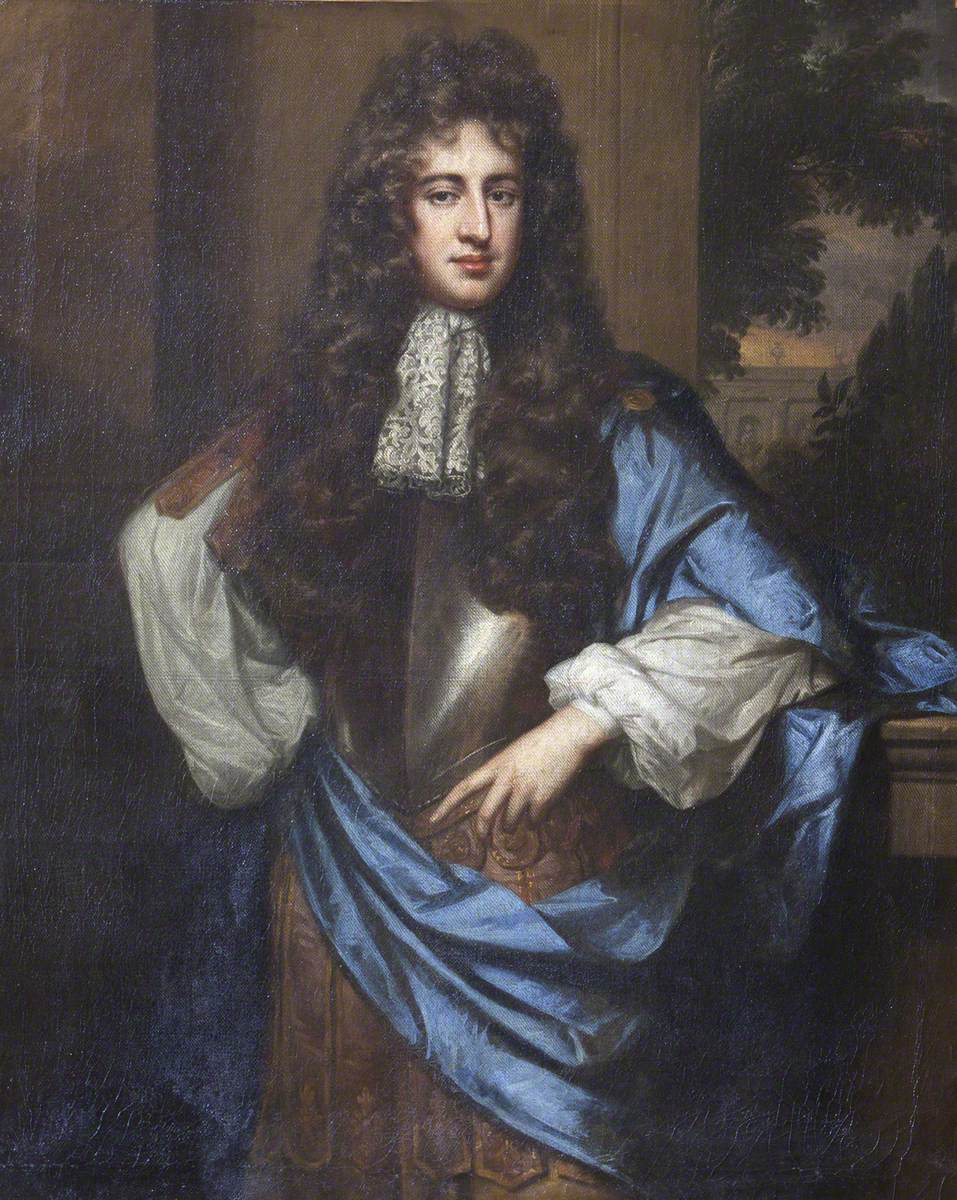
- A portrait of Sir Henry Hobart by Willem Wissing
- Born: 1657; Blickling Hall, Norfolk
- Died: 21 August 1698 (aged 40–41); Blickling Hall, Norfolk
- Occupation: Politician
- Known for: Killed in a duel

Sir Henry Hobart, 4th Baronet (1657 – 21 August 1698) was an English Whig politician and baronet. He represented several seats in the House of Commons of England between 1681 and 1698, when he was killed in a duel with Oliver Le Neve.

== Early life and family ==
Henry Hobart was the eldest son to Sir John Hobart, 3rd Baronet and his first wife Mary Hampden, daughter to John Hampden. He was educated at Thetford Grammar School and St John's College, Cambridge, graduating in 1675. He was knighted at Blickling by King Charles II of England in 1671 and succeeded his father as baronet in 1683.

On 9 July 1684, he married Elizabeth Maynard, eldest daughter of Sir Joseph Maynard, and had by her a son and three daughters. His eldest daughter Henrietta was a mistress of King George II of Great Britain. The second daughter Catherine married Lieutenant-General Charles Churchill. Lady Hobart died in 1701.

Hobart was succeeded in the baronetcy by his son John, later raised to the peerage as Earl of Buckinghamshire.

== Career ==
Hobart was a Member of Parliament for King's Lynn between 1681 and 1685. His father's death in 1683 left Hobart as the leader of the Whigs in Norfolk. He represented Thetford from January to February 1689 and subsequently Norfolk until 1690. In 1689 he was appointed an equerry to King William III. Despite Hobart's influence in the county, he was unable to retain a seat in the election of 1690 when he was the only Whig to stand for election in Norfolk.

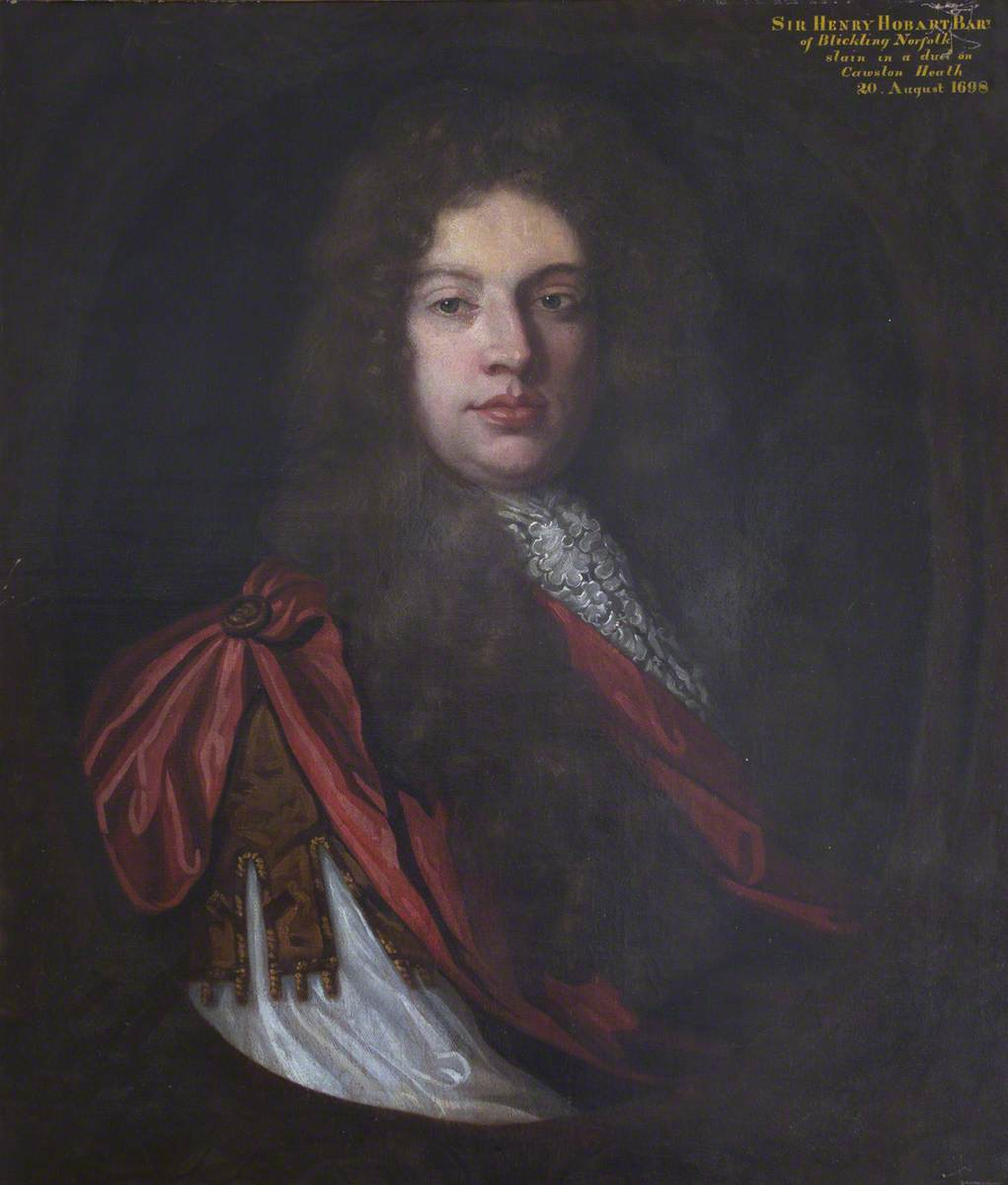
Sir Henry Hobart, Bt by Godfrey Kneller

Hobart served as a Gentleman of the Horse to William III during the Williamite War in Ireland and fought under him in the Battle of the Boyne. In 1691 he was removed from office in the king's household, but the same year he was appointed Vice-Admiral of Norfolk.

In 1694, he was elected for Bere Alston in a by-election on the interest of his brother-in-law, the Earl of Stamford. During this parliament he was put on the committee to prepare the impeachment of the Duke of Leeds. In 1695 he was returned again for Norfolk when he continued to vote in support of the king's ministry and was a leader of the Rose Club. He was quick to sign the Association of 1696 and thereafter promoted it zealously in his own county. Following the 1696 Jacobite assassination plot, Hobart successfully lobbied the Privy Council for the arrest of his local rival, Sir Christopher Calthorpe.

In April 1697, he was promised the role of commissioner of customs by the Earl of Sunderland, but Sir John Austen was appointed instead. After Hobart complained to Sunderland about the snub, he was appointed to another vacant commissionership in June. In 1698, Hobart attempted for a third time to bring in a bill to limit the wearing of imported Indian cloth, but he was defeated. In the July–August 1698 election, Hobart lost his seat to a Tory. He had also attempted to win the seat of St Ives, but lost there too.

== Death ==
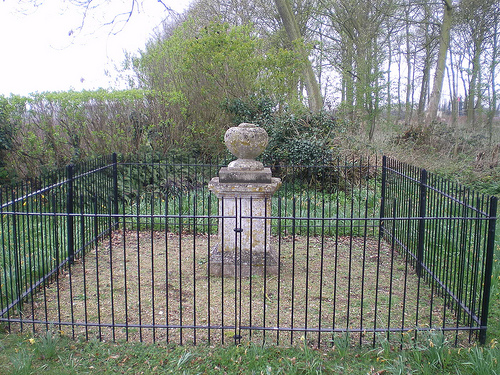
The Duel Stone

In August, after the 1698 election, Hobart was informed that a neighbouring Tory gentleman, Oliver Le Neve, had been spreading word that Hobart had been a coward while serving in Ireland. Hobart immediately issued a challenge to a duel, and although Le Neve denied the accusation, Hobart would not accept an apology and demanded a fight.

On 20 August 1698, the two fought the duel on Cawston Heath, during which Hobart was mortally wounded. Le Neve of Witchingham Hall, Great Witchingham, fought left-handed and was wounded in the arm by Hobart who had a reputation as a good swordsman. However, Le Neve struck back and injured his opponent so badly that he died the next day at Blickling Hall. As there were no seconds or witnesses, the duel was illegal. Le Neve fled to Holland but returned to England two years later, when he was tried and acquitted. Hobart was buried in the Blickling family vault. A plinth with an urn, called the Duel Stone, which commemorates the duel, stands in a National Trust plot on Norwich Road in Cawston.

Parliament of England
Preceded by John Turner; Sir Simon Taylor	Member of Parliament for King's Lynn; 1681–1685; With: Sir Simon Taylor	Succeeded by Sir John Turner; Sir Simon Taylor
Preceded by William de Grey; Henry Heveningham	Member of Parliament for Thetford; Jan–Feb 1689; With: William Harbord	Succeeded by William Harbord; Sir Francis Guybon
Preceded by Sir Thomas Hare, Bt; Sir Jacob Astley	Member of Parliament for Norfolk; 1689–1690; With: Sir William Cook	Succeeded by Sir Jacob Astley; Sir William Cook
Preceded by John Smith; John Swinfen	Member of Parliament for Bere Alston; 1694–1695; With: John Smith 1694–1695; John Elwill 1695	Succeeded by John Elwill; Sir Rowland Gwynne
Preceded by Sir Jacob Astley; Sir William Cook	Member of Parliament for Norfolk; 1695–1698; With: Sir Jacob Astley	Succeeded by Sir Jacob Astley; Sir William Cook
Honorary titles
Vacant Title last held by The Earl of Yarmouth	Vice-Admiral of Norfolk; 1691–1698	Succeeded by Lord Paston
Baronetage of England
Preceded by John Hobart	Baronet (of Intwood); 1683–1698	Succeeded by John Hobart
