= List of Privy Counsellors (1679–1714) =

This is a list of privy counsellors of England and Great Britain appointed between the reorganisation of the Privy Council in 1679 and the death of Queen Anne in 1714.

== Charles II, 1679–1685 ==
=== 1679 ===
- The Earl of Shaftesbury (1621–1683) (expelled 1679)
- The Lord Finch (1620–1682)
- The Earl of Anglesey (1614–1686)
- The Duke of Albemarle (1653–1688)
- The Duke of Monmouth (1649–1685)
- The Marquess of Winchester (c.1630–1699)
- The Earl of Arlington (1618–1685)
- The Earl of Salisbury (1648–1683) (expelled 1681)
- The Earl of Bridgewater (1623–1686)
- The Earl of Sunderland (1641–1702) (expelled 1681; readmitted 1682)
- The Earl of Essex (c.1631–1683)
- The Earl of Bath (1628–1701)
- The Viscount Halifax (1633–1695) (expelled 1685)
- The Hon. Henry Compton (c.1632–1713)
- The Lord Roberts (1606–1685)
- The Lord Cavendish (1640–1707)
- The Lord Russell (1639–1683)
- The Hon. Henry Coventry (1619–1686)
- Sir Francis North (1637–1685)
- Sir Henry Capell (1638–1696)
- Sir John Ernle (1620–1697)
- Sir Thomas Chicheley (1614–1699) (expelled 1687)
- Sir William Temple, Bt (1628–1699)
- Edward Seymour (1633–1708)
- Henry Powle (1630–1692)
- William Sancroft (1617–1693)
- The Duke of Lauderdale (1616–1682)
- The Marquess of Worcester (1629–1700)
- The Viscount Fauconberg (c.1627–1700)
- The Duke of Newcastle (1630–1691)
- The Lord Holles (1598–1680)
- The Hon. Laurence Hyde (1642–1711)
- Sidney Godolphin (1645–1712)
- Sir Leoline Jenkins (1623–1685)

=== 1680 ===
- The Hon. Daniel Finch (1647–1730)
- The Earl of Ossory (1634–1680)
- Sir Robert Carr, Bt (1637–1682)
- The Earl of Oxford (1627–1703)
- The Earl of Ailesbury (1626–1685)
- The Earl of Chesterfield (1634–1714)

=== 1681 ===
- The Earl of Conway (c.1623–1683)
- The Earl of Craven (1608–1697)

=== 1682 ===
- George Legge (c.1647–1691)
- The Duke of Ormond (1610–1688)
- The Earl of Lindsey (1630–1701)
- Sir Francis Pemberton (1624–1697)
- The Earl of Huntingdon (1650–1701)
- The Earl of Peterborough (1621–1697)

=== 1683 ===
- Sir George Jeffreys (1648–1689)

=== 1684 ===
- The Earl of Moray (1634–1701)
- The Earl of Middleton (1649/50–1719)

=== 1685 ===
- John Drummond (1650–1715)

== James II, 1685–1688 ==
- Prince George of Denmark (1653–1708)
- The Duke of Queensberry (1637–1695)
- The Earl of Perth (1648–1716)
- The Earl of Mulgrave (1647–1721)
- The Earl of Berkeley (c.1628–1698)
- Sir Edward Herbert (c.1648–1698)
- The Viscount Preston (1648–1695)
- The Earl of Plymouth (c.1627–1687)

=== 1688 ===
- The Lord Crew (1633–1721)
- The Earl of Powis (1626–1696)
- The Lord Arundell of Wardour (c.1606–1694)
- The Lord Belasyse (1614–1689)
- The Lord Dover (c.1636–1708) (Earl of Dover in the Jacobite Peerage)
- The Earl of Tyrconnell (c.1630–1691)
- The Earl of Castlemaine (1634–1705)
- The Duke of Hamilton (1634–1694)
- Sir Nicholas Butler
- Sir Edward Petre, 3rd Baronet (1631–1699)

=== 1688 ===
- Silius Titus (1623–1704)

== William III and Mary II, 1689–1702 ==
=== 1689 ===
- The Earl of Danby (1632–1712)
- The Duke of Norfolk (1655–1701)
- The Earl of Lindsey (1630–1701)
- The Earl of Dorset (1643–1706)
- The Earl of Oxford (1627–1703)
- The Earl of Shrewsbury (1660–1718) (expelled 1692; re-admitted 1694)
- The Earl of Bedford (1616–1700)
- The Earl of Macclesfield (c.1618–1694)
- The Earl of Monmouth (1658–1735)
- The Viscount Newport (1620–1708)
- The Lord Lumley (c.1650–1721)
- The Hon. Henry Compton (c.1632–1713)
- The Lord Montagu of Boughton (1638–1709)
- The Lord Delamer (1652–1694)
- The Lord Churchill (1650–1722)
- William Bentinck (1649–1709)
- The Hon. Henry Sydney (1641–1704)
- The Hon. Sir Robert Howard (1626–1698)
- Edward Russell (1653–1727)
- Richard Hampden (1631–1695)
- Hugh Boscawen (1625–1701)
- The Hon. Thomas Wharton (1648–1715)
- Sir John Lowther, Bt (1655–1700)
- Arthur Herbert (c.1648–1716)
- William Harbord (1635–1692)
- The Duke of Schomberg (1615–1690)
- Sir John Holt (1642–1710)
- The Earl of Pembroke (c.1656–1733)

=== 1690 ===
- Sir Henry Goodricke, Bt (c.1642–c.1705)
- The Marquess of Winchester (1661–1722)
- The Lord Godolphin (1645–1712)

=== 1691 ===
- Sir John Trevor (c.1637–1717)
- The Earl of Bridgewater (1646–1701)
- John Tillotson (1630–1694)

=== 1692 ===
- The Earl of Rochester (1642–1711)
- The Earl of Ranelagh (1641–1712)
- The Lord Cornwallis (1655–1698)
- Sir Edward Seymour, Bt (1632/3–1708)
- The Viscount Falkland (1656–1694)
- The Lord Lexinton (1662–1723)

=== 1693 ===
- Sir John Somers (1651–1716)
- Sir John Trenchard (1649–1695)
- The Lord Coningsby (1656–1729) (expelled 1724)

=== 1694 ===
- Viscount Dursley (1649–1710)
- The Earl of Stamford (c.1654–1720)
- Charles Montagu (1661–1715)

=== 1695 ===
- Thomas Tenison (1636–1715)
- Sir William Trumbull (1639–1716)
- The Duke of Schomberg (1641–1719)
- The Earl of Tankerville (1655–1701)
- The Hon. Peregrine Bertie (c.1663–1711)
- John Smith (1655–1723)

=== 1696 ===
- The Duke of Ormonde (1665–1745) (expelled 1715)
- Sir Joseph Williamson (1633–1701)

=== 1697 ===
- The Earl of Jersey (1656–1711)
- James Vernon (c.1646–c.1727)

=== 1698 ===
- The Earl of Manchester (c.1662–1722)

=== 1699 ===
- The Lord Ferrers of Chartley (1650–1717)

=== 1700 ===
- Sir Nathan Wright (1654–1721)
- Sir Charles Hedges (1649/50–1714)

=== 1701 ===
- The Hon. Henry Boyle (1669–1725)
- The Earl of Lindsey (1660–1723)
- The Earl of Carlisle (c.1669–1738)
- The Duke of Somerset (1662–1748)

=== 1702 ===
- The Earl of Radnor (1660–1723)
- The Earl of Burlington (1660–1704)

== Anne, 1702–1714 ==
=== 1702 ===
- The Marquess of Normanby (1648–1721)
- The Earl of Abingdon (1673–1743)
- Sir John Leveson-Gower, Bt (1675–1709)
- John Grobham Howe (1657–1722)
- The Earl of Nottingham (1647–1730)
- The Earl of Northampton (1664–1727)
- The Viscount Weymouth (1640–1714)
- The Lord Dartmouth (1672–1750)
- The Hon. John Granville (1665–1707)
- Sir Thomas Trevor (1658–1730)
- Sir George Rooke (1650–1709)
- The Lord Poulett (c.1668–1743)

=== 1703 ===
- John Sharp (1645–1714)
- The Earl of Thanet (1644–1729)
- The Lord Guernsey (c.1649–1719)

=== 1704 ===
- The Earl of Kent (1671–1740)
- Robert Harley (1661–1724)
- Thomas Mansell (1667–1723)

=== 1705 ===
- The Duke of Newcastle (1662–1711)
- The Earl of Peterborough (1658–1735)
- The Lord Cholmondeley (1662–1725)
- Thomas Erle (1650–1720)
- William Cowper (c.1665–1723)

=== 1706 ===
- The Earl of Derby (1664–1736)
- The Earl of Sunderland (1675–1722)

=== 1707 ===
- The Duke of Devonshire (1672–1729)

=== 1708 ===
- The Marquess of Dorchester (1665–1726)
- The Earl of Bindon (1670–1718)
- The Earl of Mar (1675–1732)
- The Viscount Townshend (1674–1738)
- The Duke of Queensberry (1662–1711)
- The Earl of Seafield (1664–1730)
- The Duke of Montrose (1682–1742)
- The Earl Rivers (c.1654–1712)
- The Earl of Essex (1670–1710)
- The Earl of Loudoun (c.1675–1731)
- Thomas Coke (1674–1727)

=== 1709 ===
- The Duke of Argyll (1680–1743)
- The Duke of Roxburghe (1680–1741)
- Sir John Holland, Bt (c.1669–1724)
- The Earl of Orford (1653–1727)

=== 1710 ===
- The Earl of Bradford (1644–1723)
- Sir Thomas Parker (1666–1732) (expelled 1725)
- Sir Richard Onslow, Bt. (1654–1717)
- The Earl of Anglesey (1676–1710)
- Henry St John (1678–1751)
- Sir Simon Harcourt (1661–1727)
- Lord Hyde (1672–1753)
- The Earl of Anglesey (c.1678–1737)
- The Duke of Beaufort (1684–1714)

=== 1711 ===
- The Earl of Orrery (1674–1731)
- The Earl of Orkney (1666–1737)
- The Marquess of Annandale (1664–1721)
- The Earl of Winchilsea (1672–1712)
- Robert Benson (c.1676–1731)
- The Hon. Henry Paget (1663–1743)
- The Earl of Strafford (1672–1739)
- William Bromley (1663–1732)
- John Robinson (1650–1723)
- The Earl of Clarendon (1661–1723)
- The Earl of Islay (1682–1761)
- The Lord North (1678–1734)

=== 1712 ===
- The Duke of Atholl (1660–1724)
- The Lord Lansdowne (1666–1735)
- The Earl of Portmore (c.1656–1730))
- Major-General John Hill (d. 1735)
- The Lord Guilford (1673–1729)

=== 1713 ===
- The Duke of Northumberland (1665–1716)
- Sir John Stonehouse, Bt. (c. 1672–1733)
- Sir William Wyndham, Bt (c.1688–1740)
