= Robert Coke (King's Lynn MP) =

English politician

Robert Coke (1651–1679), of Thorington, Suffolk and Holkham, Norfolk, was an English politician.

He was the only son of Richard Coke and was educated at Queens' College, Cambridge.

He was appointed Deputy Lieutenant of Norfolk from 1673 to his death and High Sheriff of Norfolk for 1676–77. In 1675 he was elected a Member (MP) of the Parliament of England for King's Lynn.

He married in 1674 Lady Anne Osborne, daughter of Sir Thomas Osborne, 1st Duke of Leeds. They had 2 sons and a daughter.
