= Astley baronets of Patshull (1662) =

Baronetcy in the Baronetage of England

Astley baronets
- Escutcheon of the Astley baronets of Patshull
- Creation date: 1662
- Created by: Charles II
- Peerage: Peerage of England
- Status: extinct
- Extinction date: 1772

The Astley Baronetcy, of Patshull in the County of Stafford, was created in the Baronetage of England on 13 August 1662 for Richard Astley. The second Baronet represented Shrewsbury and Shropshire in the House of Commons. The title became extinct on his death in 1772.

== Astley baronets, of Patshull (1662) ==
- Sir Richard Astley, 1st Baronet (c. 1625–1688)
- Sir John Astley, 2nd Baronet (1687–1772)

== See also ==
- Astley baronets
