= Isaac Astley =

English baronet (died 1659)

Sir Isaac Astley, 1st Baronet (died 7 September 1659) was an English baronet.

== Information ==
He was the second son of Thomas Astley and Frances Drane, daughter of George Deane. Astley was High Sheriff of Warwickshire in 1641 and High Sheriff of Norfolk in 1645. Having been knighted in 1641, he was created a baronet, of Melton Constable, in the County of Norfolk by King Charles I of England on 21 January 1642.

Astley married firstly Rachel Messenger, daughter of Augustine Messenger, and secondly Bridget Coke, daughter of John Coke. Both marriages were childless. Astley was buried in Melton Constable in Norfolk and with his death the baronetcy became extinct. The heir of his estates was his nephew Sir Jacob Astley, 1st Baronet.

Baronetage of England
New creation	Baronet (of Melton Constable); 1642–1659	Extinct
