= Thornage =

Village in Norfolk, England

Coordinates: 52.88524°N 1.04576°E

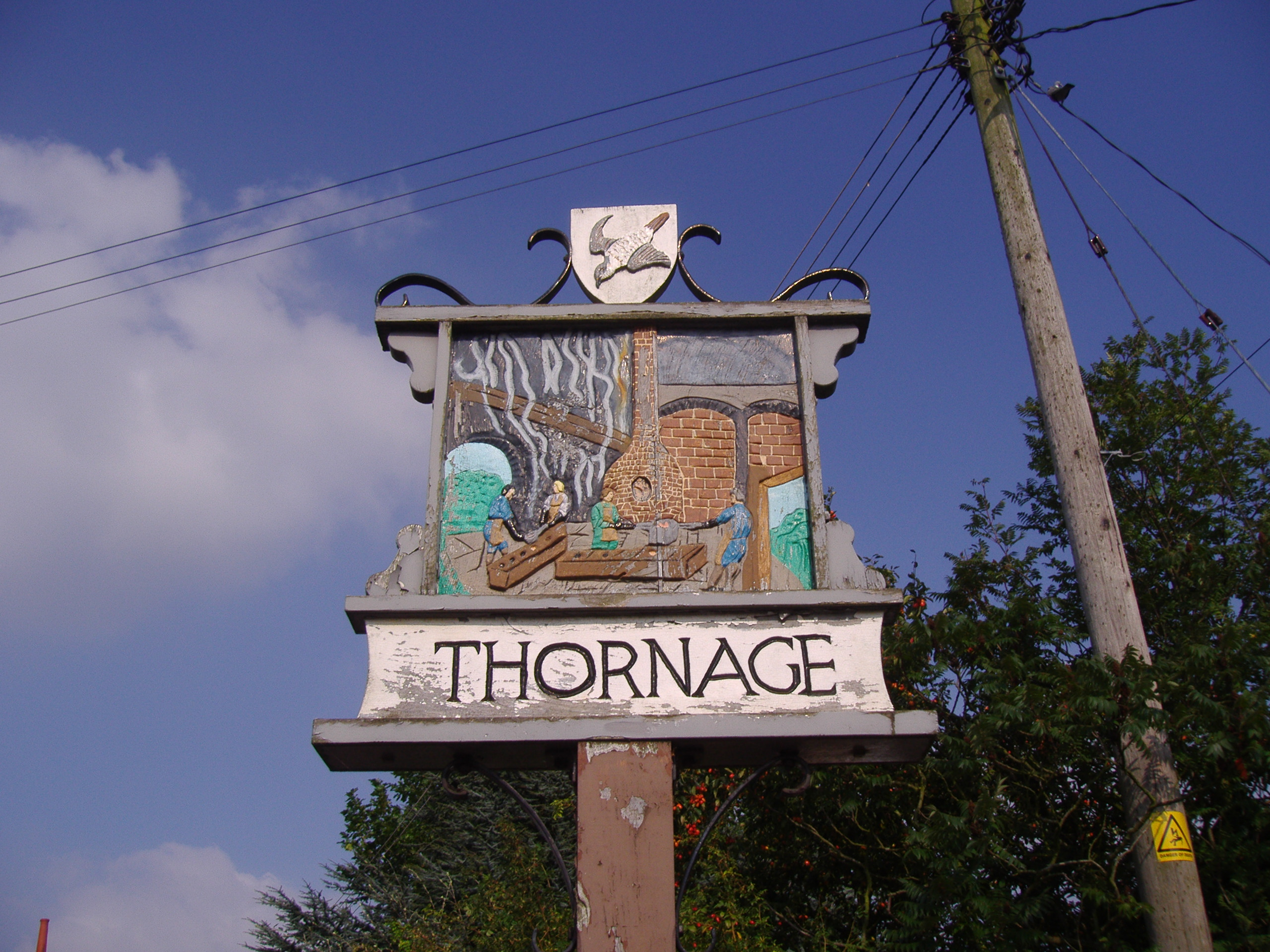
- Thornage Village sign

- Location within Norfolk
- Area: 5.12 km^{2} (1.98 sq mi)
- Population: 192 (parish, 2011 census)
  - Density: 38/km^{2} (98/sq mi)
- OS grid reference: TG051362
  - London: 125 miles
- Civil parish: Thornage
- District: North Norfolk
- Shire county: Norfolk
- Region: East
- Country: England
- Sovereign state: United Kingdom
- Post town: HOLT
- Postcode district: NR25
- Police: Norfolk
- Fire: Norfolk
- Ambulance: East of England
- UK Parliament: North Norfolk

Thornage is a village and a civil parish in the English county of Norfolk. The village is 2.7 miles south-west of Holt, 23.2 miles north-west of Norwich and 11.3 miles east of Fakenham, and straddles the B1110 road between Holt and Guist. The nearest railway station is at Sheringham for the Bittern Line which runs between Sheringham, Cromer and Norwich. The nearest airport is at Norwich International Airport.

== History ==
The villages name means 'thorn-tree park'.

Thornage has an entry in the Domesday Book of 1085. In the great book Thornage is recorded by the name ‘’Tornedis’’, the main land holder being Bishop William. The survey also lists 3 mills.

=== The Iron Foundry ===
In the 19th century there was a brass and iron foundry in the village; the foundry was run initially by John Mann, and later by his nephew, Alfred Abram, and is depicted on the village sign.

=== Thornage Hall ===
Thornage Hall is a former grange of the Bishops of Norwich. There has been a manor house on this site since the time of the Normans. The hall was built c. 1482 by Bishop Goldwall of Norwich. After the dissolution of the monasteries the hall was given to Sir William Butts by Henry VIII. In the 17th century both ends of the Hall were demolished and remodelled, but the hall windows and doorways in the centre block were retained. In 1988 a 17th-century sewer tunnel was rediscovered. Nearby there is a large brick dovecote, dating from 1728, and barns of flint and brick dating from 1718 and 1727.

=== Thornage Watermill ===
The watermill is located to the north east of the village and stands on the river Glaven whose course was altered to enable construction of the mill on a site able to hold the mill dam without flooding the surrounding area. A watermill was first recorded on this site in the Domesday Book; in the 13th century it was known as Feldmille. The present watermill, built of Norfolk red brick with a pantile roof, stopped working in 1938 and the building is now a private residence. In its working order the watermill had a breastshot 13' x 6' wheel, made entirely out of wood, which powered 4 pairs of stones driven from above and controlled by two sets of flyball governors. Three pairs of French burr stones still remained in 2011, along with some of the mill machinery, which has been incorporated into the living area of the private residence conversion.

== The Parish Church of All Saints ==
The chancel of the present Parish Church of All Saints was constructed in the early part of the 14th century. The church was substantially renovated in 1898 and in 1904. Three Norman windows can be seen in the nave and the chancel. At some time the church had a south aisle, as the blocked up arcade shows. Inside the church is the tomb chest of Sir William Butts, who died in 1583. His father, also named Sir William Butts, was the chief physician in the household of Henry VIII. The church's communion plate is very ancient, as is the chalice, on which are inscribed the words "was the gyfte of John Butts (or Butes), and Margaret, his wife - 1456".

== Notable people ==
- Sir William Butts was a Fellow of the College of Physicians and became physician to Henry VIII, whose confidence he enjoyed to a remarkable degree. He was a keen supporter of the Reformation. William was educated at Gonville Hall, Cambridge, of which he became a Fellow. He proceeded to become a B.A. in 1506, M.A. in 1509, and M.D. in 1518. He was made a Fellow of the College of Physicians on 9 November 1529. He was the friend of Thomas Cardinal Wolsey, Thomas Cranmer, and Hugh Latimer. William was knighted by Henry VIII, under the title of Sir William Butts, of Norfolk. He was immortalised by Shakespeare, in his play "Henry VIII", and his portrait is in Holbein's picture of the delivery of the Charter to the Barber Surgeons. Sir William's family had been in possession of the manor of Thornage for some considerable time when he was additionally given the Hall, once the grange of the Bishop of Norwich, by Henry VIII in 1536.
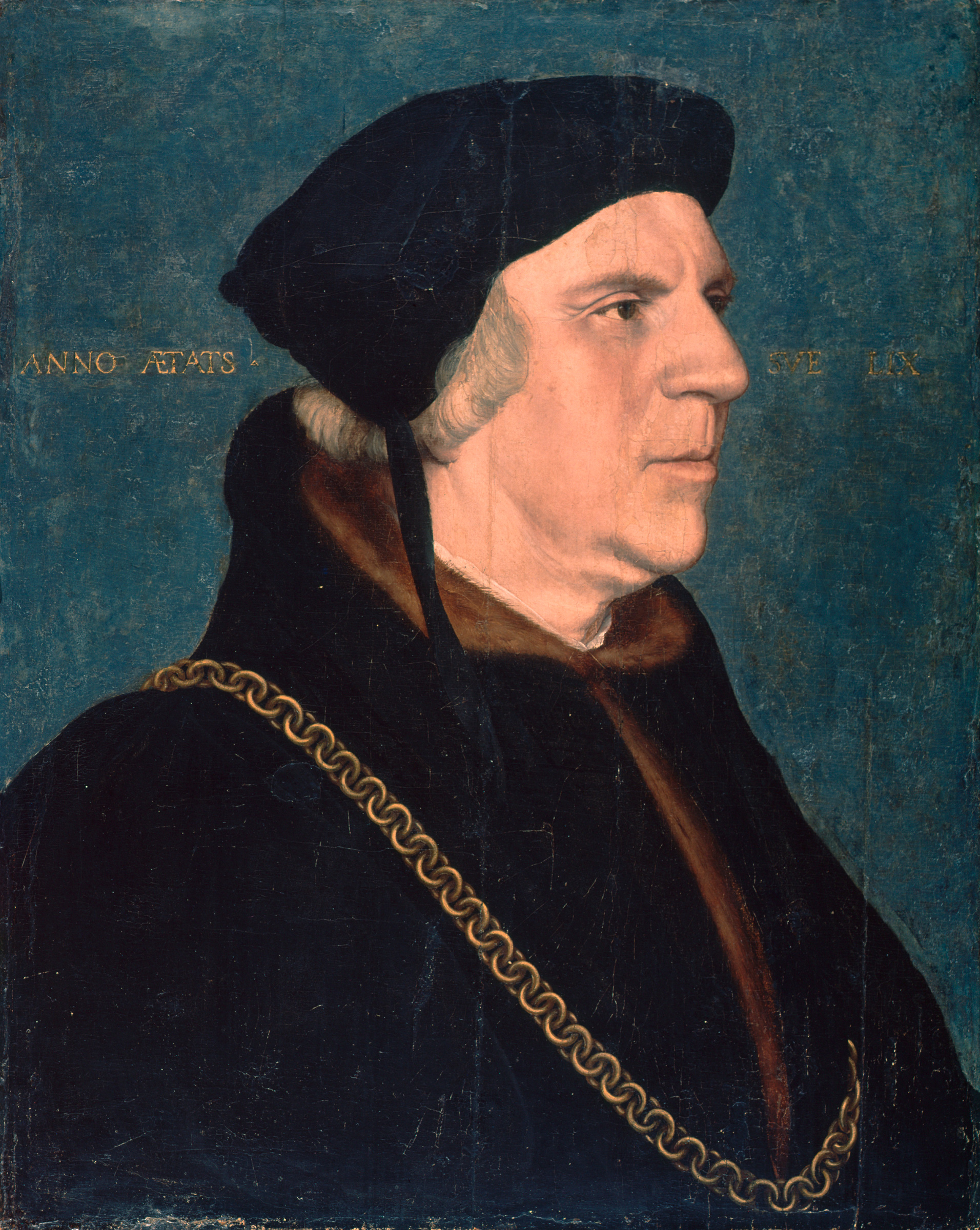
  Portrait of William Butts after Hans Holbein the Younger (c. 1540)
- John Astley was Rector, 1758–1803
