= Astley baronets =

There have been four baronetcies created for members of the Astley family, three in the Baronetage of England and one in the Baronetage of the United Kingdom. As of 2008 only one creation was extant.

- Astley baronets, of Melton Constable (1642): see Sir Isaac Astley, 1st Baronet
- Astley baronets of Hill Morton (1660)
- Astley baronets of Patshull (1662)
- Astley, later Astley-Corbett, later Astley baronets, of Everley (1821)
