= Sir Jacob Astley, 1st Baronet =

English Tory politician and baronet

Sir Jacob Astley, 1st Baronet (ca. 1639 – 17 August 1729) of Melton Constable Hall, Norfolk was an English Tory politician and baronet.

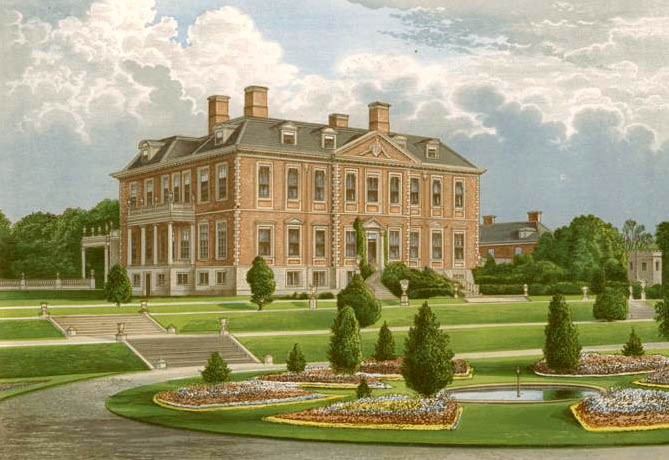
Melton Constable Hall, Norfolk, circa 1880

== Background ==
He was the oldest son of Edward Astley and his wife Elizabeth Astley, daughter of his uncle Jacob Astley, 1st Baron Astley of Reading. Astley was educated first at Norwich School, then King's College, Cambridge, and finally Christ Church, Oxford, where he matriculated on 19 June 1659. On 7 September of the same year on the death of his paternal uncle Sir Isaac Astley, 1st Baronet, he inherited the estates of Hill Morton, Warwickshire and Melton Constable, and in 1688 the Maidstone, Kent estates of his cousin Jacob Astley, 3rd Baron Astley of Reading. In 1664 he commenced the building of the present Melton Constable Hall. He sold the Kent estate in 1720.

== Career ==
Having been already knighted, Astley was created a Baronet, of Hill Morton, in the County of Warwick on 26 June 1660. He was appointed High Sheriff of Norfolk for 1664 before entering the British House of Commons in 1685 as MP for Norfolk until 1689. He represented the constituency again from 1690 to 1701, from 1702 to 1705 and a last time from 1710 to 1722. Astley was High Sheriff of Norfolk in 1664 and Commissioner of Trade between 1714 and 1717.

== Family ==
On 6 February 1661, he married Blanche Wodehouse, eldest daughter of Sir Philip Wodehouse, 3rd Baronet. They had four sons and a daughter. Astley was buried at Melton Constable few days after his death. He was succeeded in the baronetcy by his second and oldest surviving son Philip. MP Philip Metcalfe was his great-grandson.

Parliament of England
Preceded by Sir John Hobart; Sir Peter Gleane	Member of Parliament for Norfolk; 1685–1689; With: Sir Thomas Hare, Bt	Succeeded by Sir William Cook; Sir Henry Hobart
Preceded by Sir William Cook; Sir Henry Hobart	Member of Parliament for Norfolk; 1690–1701; With: Sir William Cook 1690–1695; Sir Henry Hobart 1695–1698; Sir William Cook 1698–1701; Roger Townshend 1701	Succeeded by Roger Townshend; Sir John Holland
Preceded by Roger Townshend; Sir John Holland	Member of Parliament for Norfolk; 1702–1705; With: Sir John Holland	Succeeded by Roger Townshend; Sir John Holland
Parliament of Great Britain
Preceded by Ashe Windham; Sir John Holland	Member of Parliament for Norfolk; 1710–1722; With: Sir John Wodehouse 1710–1713; Sir Edmund Bacon 1713–1715; Thomas de Grey 1715–1722	Succeeded by Thomas de Grey; Thomas Coke
Baronetage of England
New creation	Baronet (of Hill Morton); 1660–1729	Succeeded by Philip Astley
