= Paston =

Paston may refer to:

== People ==
- Edward Paston (1550–1630), a poet and amateur musician
- Erasmus Paston, MP
- George Paston (1860–1936), British author and critic
- Mark Paston (born 1976), New Zealand footballer
- Thomas Paston (died 1550), an English politician
- Paston Baronets, the Earls of Yarmouth
- Paston Coke (born 1971)

== Other ==
- Paston, Norfolk, England
- Paston, Northumberland, England, see Bolton, Northumberland
- Paston, Peterborough, Cambridgeshire
- Paston College in Norfolk
- Paston Letters
- The Paston Treasure

== See also ==
- John Paston (disambiguation)
- William Paston (disambiguation)
