= Charlotte Paston, Countess of Yarmouth =

Illegitimate daughter of Charles II of England

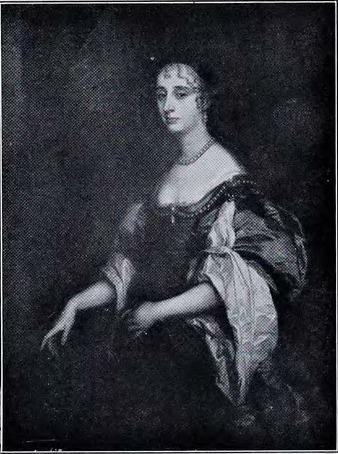
- Born: Charlotte Jemima Henrietta Maria FitzRoy c. 1650
- Died: 28 July 1684 (aged 33–34)
- Buried: 4 August 1684; Westminster Abbey
- Spouse: James Howard (died 1669) William Paston, 2nd Earl of Yarmouth (m. 1672)
- Issue Detail: Stuarta Werburge Howard; Charles Paston, Lord Paston; Lady Charlotte Paston; Lady Rebecca Paston; Hon. William Paston
- Father: Charles II of England
- Mother: Elizabeth Killigrew, Viscountess Shannon

Charlotte Jemima Henrietta Maria Paston, Countess of Yarmouth (née FitzRoy; c. 1650 – 28 July 1684) was one of the many acknowledged illegitimate children of Charles II of England.

Her mother, Elizabeth Boyle, wife of Francis Boyle (afterwards Viscount Shannon in Ireland), had been a maid of honour to Charles II's mother, Queen Henrietta Maria.

== Marriages and death ==
Charlotte married firstly James Howard, with whom she had a daughter, Stuarta. In 1672, she married William Paston, later the second Earl of Yarmouth, a member of the Paston family, and had issue. Both William and his father, Robert Paston, 1st Earl of Yarmouth, were in high favour with the Stuarts.

Charlotte died on 28 July 1684 in London and was buried at Westminster Abbey on 4 August 1684.

== Children ==
With her first husband, James Howard (d. 1669), Lady Charlotte had a daughter:

- Stuarta Werburge Howard, who died unmarried in 1706. Stuarta was a lady-in-waiting to Queen Mary II. She was nearly married to the 1st Earl of Portland, but their engagement was abandoned. This resulted in a duel between Lord Portland and her stepfather, Yarmouth.

Charlotte FitzRoy had at least four more children by her second husband, William Paston, who in 1683 became Earl of Yarmouth:

- Charles Paston, Lord Paston (29 May 1673 – 15 December 1718), of Oxnead Hall, Norfolk. He later married Elizabeth Pitt and had a daughter, Elizabeth Paston.
- Lady Charlotte Paston (1675–1736), who married Thomas Herne of Haveringland Hall, Norfolk, and had a son, Paston Herne, whose illegitimate daughter Anne Herne married Sir Everard Buckworth (later Buckworth-Herne), 5th Baronet, and was the mother of Sir Buckworth Buckworth-Herne-Soame, 6th Baronet, who in turn was the paternal grandfather of Charles Buckworth-Herne-Soame. Lady Charlotte was also married to a Major Weldron.
- Lady Rebecca Paston (14 January 1680/1681–1726), who married Sir John Holland, 2nd Baronet; and with him had at least three children.
- Hon. William Paston (1682–1711), a captain in the Royal Navy; died unmarried
