= William Paston, 2nd Earl of Yarmouth =

British peer and politician

The Right Honourable The Earl of Yarmouth FRS
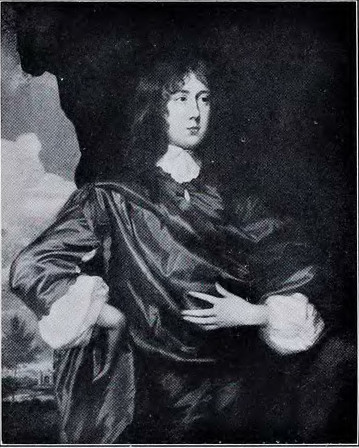

Member of Parliament for Norwich
- In office 1678–1683 Serving with Francis Corie, Augustine Briggs
- Preceded by: Christopher Jay; Francis Corie
- Succeeded by: Robert Paston; Sir Nevill Catlin

Personal details
- Born: William Paston; 1654
- Died: 25 December 1732 (aged 77–78) Epsom, Surrey
- Spouse(s): Charlotte FitzRoy (m. 1671; died 1684) Hon. Elizabeth Wiseman (m. 1687; died 1730)
- Relations: Sir William Paston, 1st Baronet (grandfather)
- Children: 4, including Charles Paston, Lord Paston
- Parent(s): Robert Paston, 1st Earl of Yarmouth; Rebecca Clayton
- Education: Trinity College, Cambridge

William Paston, 2nd Earl of Yarmouth FRS (1654 – 25 December 1732) of Oxnead, Norfolk and Turnham Green, Chiswick, Middlesex was a British peer and politician.

== Early life ==
Born in 1654, he was the eldest surviving son of six sons and three daughters of Robert Paston, 1st Earl of Yarmouth and his wife, Rebecca, née Clayton and was educated at Trinity College, Cambridge. He succeeded his father as 2nd Earl of Yarmouth in 1683, inheriting his estate and Oxnead Hall.

His paternal grandparents were the antiquarian and arts collector Sir William Paston, 1st Baronet of Oxnead and, his first wife, Lady Katherine Bertie (a daughter of the 1st Earl of Lindsey). His maternal grandfather was Sir Jasper Clayton, a haberdasher from London.

== Career ==
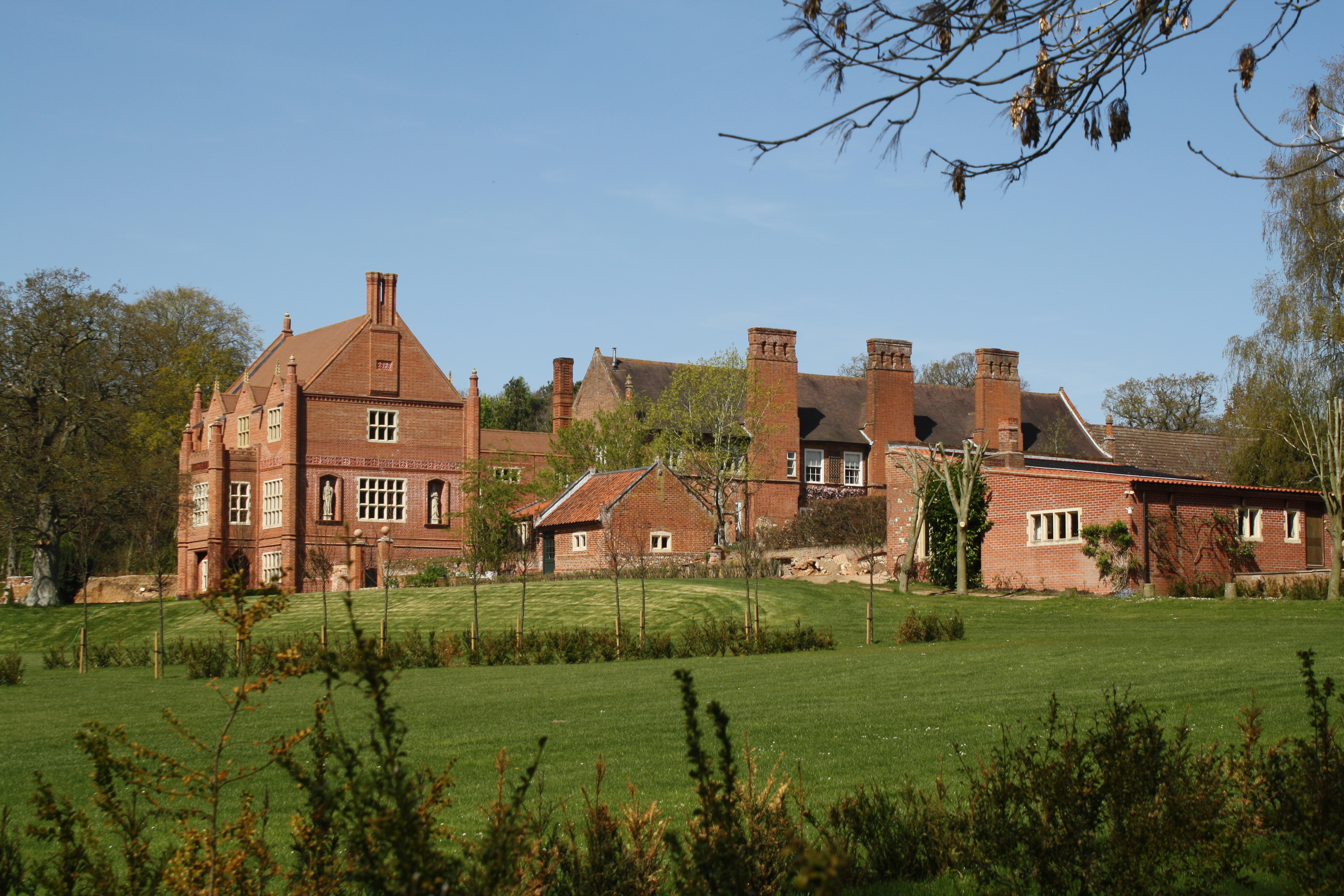
Oxnead Hall today

Paston was elected as a Tory Member of Parliament for Norwich from 1678. In 1679, when his father was made an earl, William adopted the style of Lord Paston. He continued to represent Norwich until he inherited his father's title.

He converted to Roman Catholicism and in February 1687, James II appointed him Treasurer of the Household. He was also appointed joint Lord-Lieutenant of Wiltshire and Custos Rotulorum of Wiltshire in 1688.

He reconverted to Anglicanism in 1689, but refused to swear allegiance to William and Mary when they came to the throne that year, subsequently losing all his offices.

Suspected of Jacobitism, he was imprisoned twice, but was admitted to the House of Lords in 1696. He was briefly Vice-Admiral of Norfolk in 1719.

He was elected a Fellow of the Royal Society in 1722.

== Personal life ==
In 1671, he had married the widowed Charlotte Jemima Henrietta Maria Howard (née FitzRoy) (c. 1650–1684), the illegitimate daughter of Charles II and Elizabeth Killigrew Boyle, wife of Francis Boyle (afterwards Viscount Shannon in Ireland). With her first husband, dramatist James Howard, she had a daughter, Stuarta Werburge Howard, a lady-in-waiting to Queen Mary II who died unmarried. Before her death in London on 28 July 1684, they had four children who survived childhood, though only one survived him:

- Charles Paston, Lord Paston (1673–1718), who married Elizabeth Pitt. (Note: Reportedly, Elizabeth Pitt's father was a porter and her mother was an apple-seller.)
- Lady Charlotte Paston (1675–1736), who married Thomas Herne of Haveringland Hall, Norfolk, son of Clement Herne, in 1703. After his death, she married Maj. Thomas Weldron, son of Walter Weldon, in 1732.
- Lady Rebecca Paston (1681–1726), who married Sir John Holland, 2nd Baronet, MP for Norfolk who was a grandson of Sir John Holland, 1st Baronet.
- Hon. William Paston (1682–1711), a Captain in the Royal Navy who died unmarried.

Charlotte was buried at Westminster Abbey. After her death, he married another wealthy widow, Hon. Elizabeth Wiseman (née North) (1647–1730) in March 1687. The widow of Sir Robert Wiseman, she was a daughter of Dudley North, 4th Baron North and sister to Francis North, 1st Baron Guilford, Roger North, and John North.

Lady Yarmouth died in 1830 and Lord Yarmouth died, heavily in debt, on 25 December 1732 at Epsom, Surrey, aged seventy-eight. As his sons, his brothers and their male heirs had predeceased him, his titles became extinct. His heavily mortgaged estate had to be sold.

=== Descendants ===
Throug his eldest son Charles, he was a grandfather of Hon. Elizabeth Paston (d. 1724), who also predeceased Lord Yarmouth.

Through his daughter, Lady Charlotte, he was a grandfather of Paston Herne, whose illegitimate daughter, Anne Herne, married Sir Everard Buckworth (later Buckworth-Herne), 5th Baronet, and was the mother of Sir Buckworth Buckworth-Herne-Soame, 6th Baronet.

Parliament of England
Preceded by Christopher Jay; Francis Corie	Member of Parliament for Norwich; 1678–1683; With: Francis Corie 1678; Augustine Briggs 1678–1683	Succeeded by Robert Paston; Sir Nevill Catlin
Honorary titles
Preceded by The Viscount Weymouth	Custos Rotulorum of Wiltshire; 1683–1688	Succeeded by The Viscount Weymouth
Preceded by The Earl of Pembroke	Lord Lieutenant of Wiltshire (jointly with The Earl of Pembroke); 1688–1699	Succeeded by The Earl of Pembroke
Preceded by Lord Paston	Vice-Admiral of Norfolk; 1719	Succeeded by Sir John Hobart
Political offices
Preceded by The Lord Newport	Treasurer of the Household; 1687–1689	Succeeded by The Earl of Bradford
Peerage of England
Preceded by Robert Paston	Earl of Yarmouth; 1683–1732	Extinct
