= William Paston =

William Paston may refer to:

- William Paston (died 1444) (1378–1444), Justice of the Common Pleas
- William Paston, 2nd Earl of Yarmouth (1654–1732), British peer and politician
- Sir William Paston, 1st Baronet (1528–1610), English benefactor
- William Paston, writer of the Paston Letters

== See also ==
- Paston (disambiguation)
