= Margaret Paston Alberti =

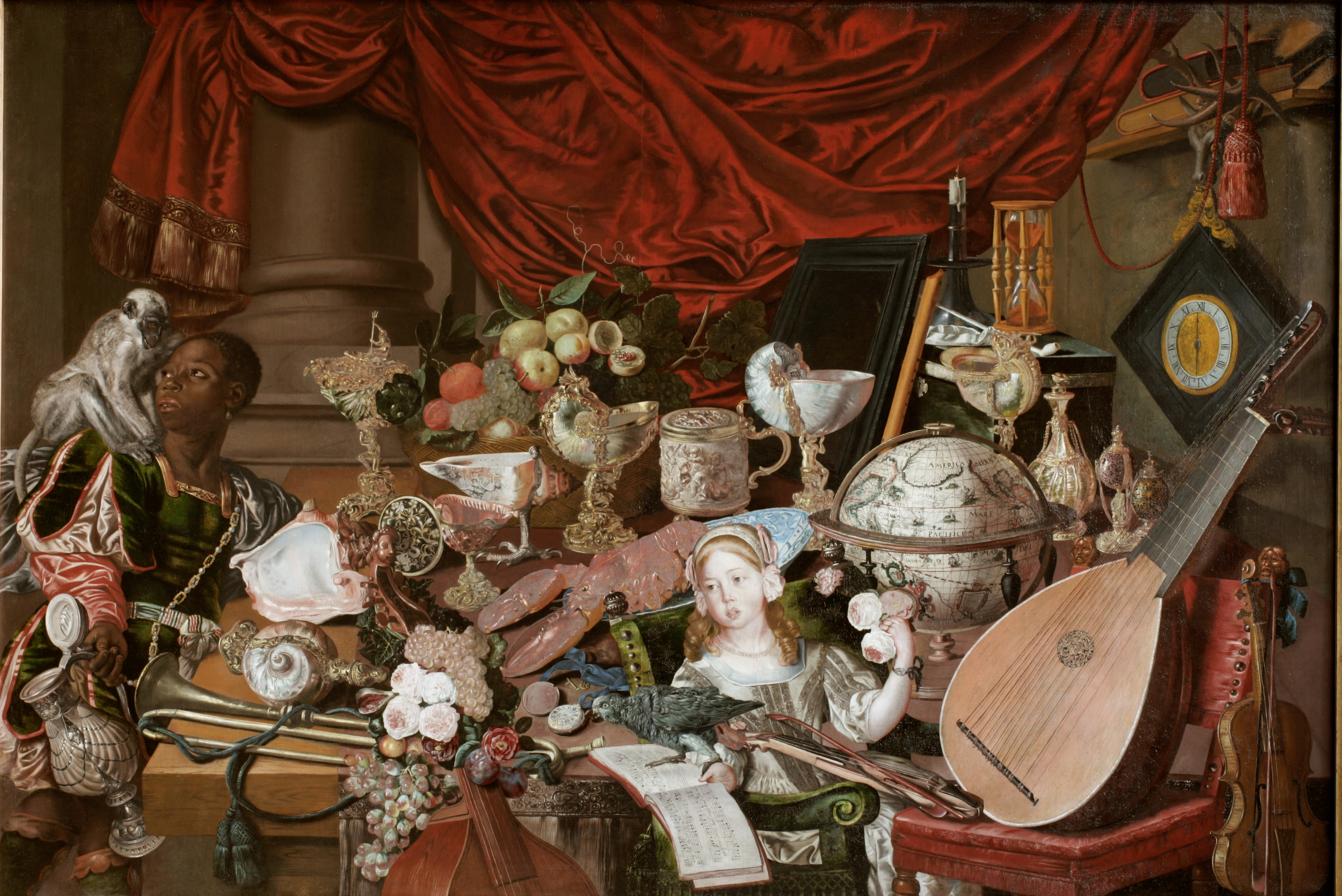
- The Paston Treasure
- Died: Venice, Italy
- Other names: Margaret Alberti; Margaret di Conti
- Spouse: Girolamo Alberti di Conti (m. 1673)
- Parents: Robert Paston (father); Rebecca Clayton (mother)

Margaret Alberti di Conti (née Paston; 1651/1652 – c 1723) was an English alchemist based in Venice. She is the likely subject of The Paston Treasure painting.

== Biography ==
Margaret was born to Robert Paston, 1st Earl of Yarmouth and Rebecca Clayton of Oxnead. She became acquainted with alchemy through her father and attended his laboratory from a young age. The young girl depicted in the painting The Paston Treasure is believed to be Margaret.

Margaret's grandfather William Paston left her a £4,000 dowry, a large enough sum that she was able to choose her own husband. In 1673 at age 21, she married a Venetian diplomat and secretary Girolamo Alberti di Conti at the Italian embassy in London before relocating to Venice in 1675. Her parents disapproved of the match; they had wanted a more opportune and wealthy English nobleman such as John Godolphin for Margaret. In 1683, she wrote a letter to her mother on the birth of her twin sons, though one of them died in infancy.

By the 1680s, Margaret had established her own alchemy workshop in Venice. She recorded "numerous pharmacological and alchemical recipes" in a manuscript. One of these was an "antidote" for stomach issues her grandfather had acquired from Matteo Lucatelli of Florence. Curator Nathan Flis described Margaret's alchemical practice as "far more sophisticated" than that of her father.
