= Sir William Paston, 1st Baronet =

Sir William Paston Bt
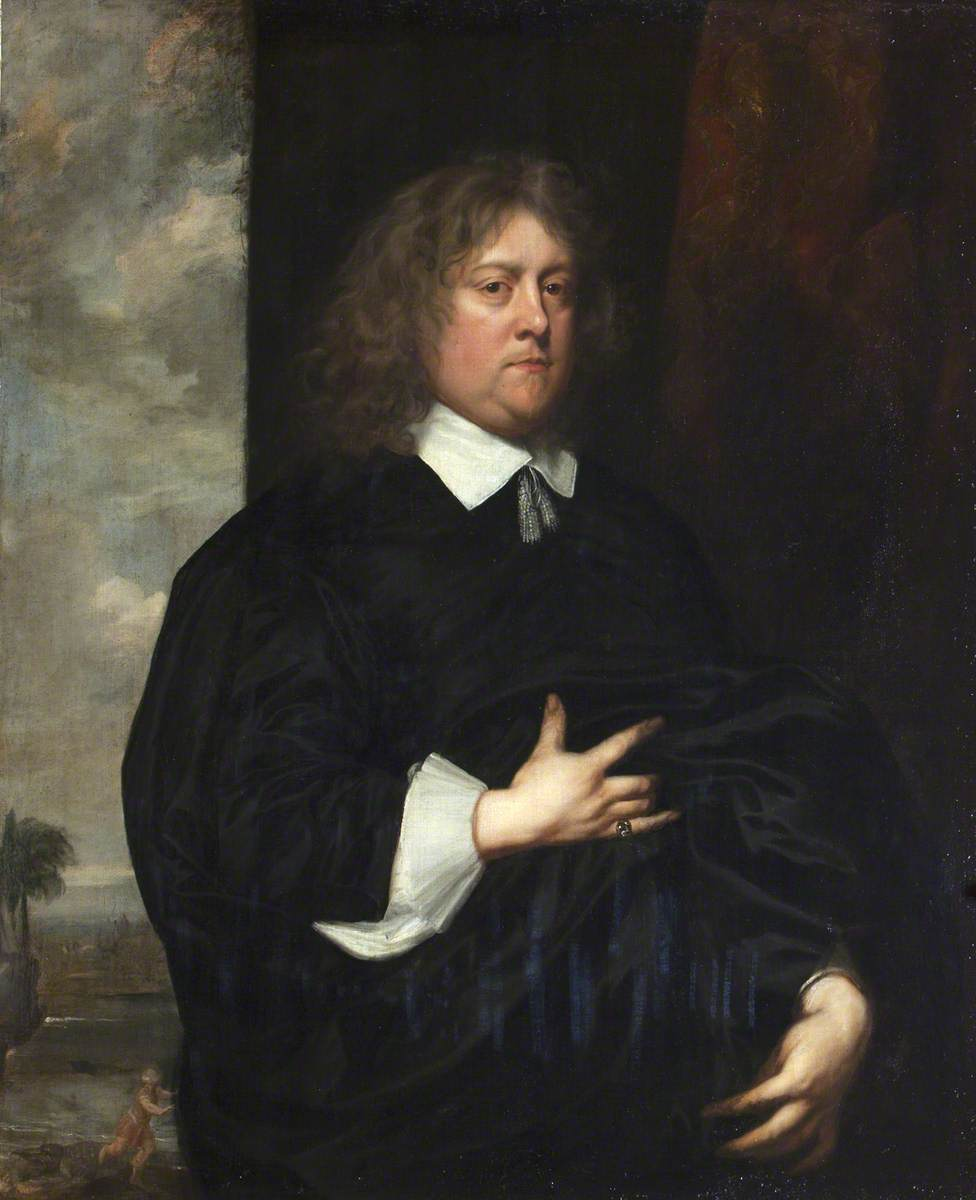
- Portrait of Sir William Paston 1st Baronet

High Sheriff of Norfolk
- In office 1646–1647
- Preceded by: Sir Edward Barkham, Bt
- Succeeded by: Sir Francis Astley

Personal details
- Born: c. 1610
- Died: 22 February 1663 (aged 52–53)
- Spouse(s): Lady Katherine Bertie; Margaret Hewitt
- Relations: William Paston, 2nd Earl of Yarmouth (grandson)
- Children: Robert Paston, 1st Earl of Yarmouth
- Parent(s): Sir Edmund Paston; Katherine Knyvett

Sir William Paston, 1st Baronet, (c. 1610 – 22 February 1663) was an antiquarian and arts collector and the father of Robert Paston, 1st Earl of Yarmouth.

== Early life ==
Paston was born in c. 1610 into the prominent Norfolk gentry Paston family. He was the eldest son of Sir Edmund Paston of Paston Hall (d. 1632) and the letter writer Katherine Knyvett of Ashwellthorpe (d. 1629).

His paternal grandparents were Christopher Paston and Anna Audeley. His maternal grandparents were Thomas Knyvett, 4th Baron Berners and the former Muriel Parry. His aunt, Muriel Knyvett, was the second wife of Sir Edmond Bell.

== Career ==
He was Sheriff of Norfolk in 1636 and created 1st baronet of Oxnead, Norfolk on the brink of the Civil War on 8 June 1642.

Paston lived at Oxnead Hall his family residence, rebuilt during the Tudor times by his family member, Clement Paston (a soldier and a sailor), Paston later added new buildings to Oxnead.

== Personal life ==
Sometime before 1631, Paston married Lady Katherine Bertie, daughter of Robert Bertie, 1st Earl of Lindsey and Hon. Elizabeth Montagu (a daughter of the 1st Baron Montagu). Before her death in January 1635, they were the parents of:

- Robert Paston, 1st Earl of Yarmouth (1631–1683), who married Rebecca Clayton, daughter of Sir Jasper Clayton, in c. 1650.

After Lady Katherine's death he married Margaret Hewitt, a sister of Sir George Hewitt, at St Mary Aldermary, London, on 27 July 1640.

Sir William Paston died on 22 February 1663, and was buried at Paston, Norfolk. After his death, his widow, the Lady Paston, married George Strode.

=== Descendants ===
Through his only son Robert, he was a grandfather of William Paston, 2nd Earl of Yarmouth, who married the widowed Charlotte Howard (née FitzRoy), the acknowledged, but illegitimate, daughter of King Charles II and Elizabeth Boyle.

Baronetage of England
Preceded by Inaugural appointment	Baronet (of Paston and Oxnead, Norfolk); 1610–1663	Succeeded by Robert Paston, 1st Earl of Yarmouth
