= The Paston Treasure =

Mid-17th century painting depicting a cabinet of treasures

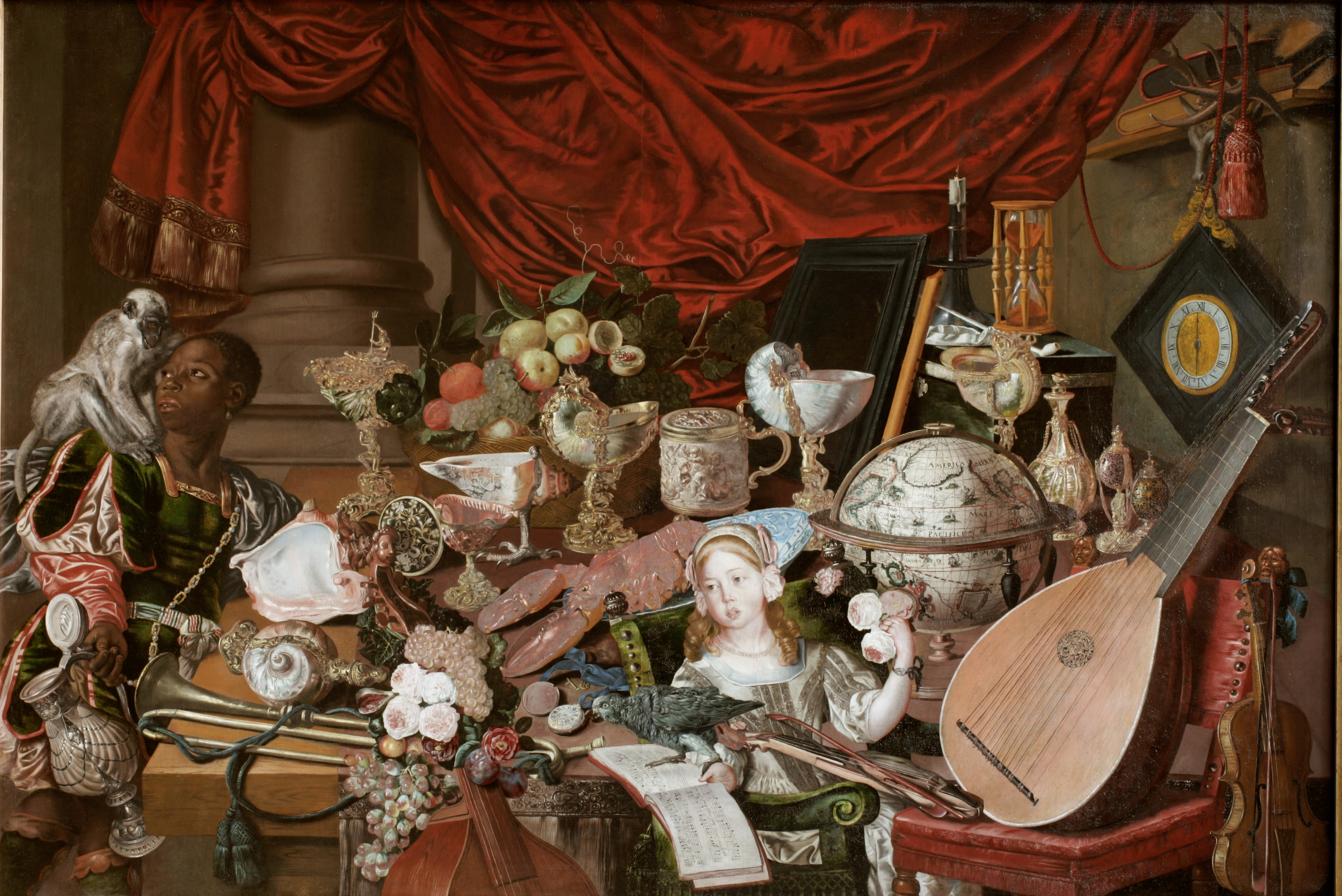
The Paston Treasure c. 1663 (246 x 165 cm)

The Paston Treasure is a c. 1663 oil painting depicting two figures among the family treasures of Sir William and Sir Robert Paston, a father-son pair of English adventurers. Commissioned by either Robert or William in the early 1660s, it serves as a historically rare record of a cabinet of treasures in British collecting. It was executed by an unknown Dutch artist who resided at the Paston family residence at Oxnead Hall near Aylsham in Norfolk for approximately 3 months, in order to complete the commission.

== Description ==
The objects were collected by Sir Robert and Sir William who made acquisitions on a long journey travelling through Europe and on to Cairo and Jerusalem. The collection consisted of over 200 objects and included many natural curiosities made into decorative art objects, such as mounted seashells and ostrich eggs. The painting was unknown for centuries, and before it was donated to the Norwich Castle Museum in 1947, its last owner warned that it was "very faded, of no artistic value, only curious from an archaeological point of view." It is now on display, with the strombus shell in an enamelled mount, as part of the Norwich Castle Museum Collection.

The people shown in the painting include a girl, possibly Margaret, daughter of Robert Paston, and a young Black man, who may represent a real enslaved individual or a fictional person included to symbolise reference to William Paston's travels.

It was the subject of an exhibition in 2018 in which Norwich Castle Museum in partnership with the Yale Center for British Art in the USA.

The Paston Treasure is the subject of a book by senior research scientist, conservator and art-historian Spike Bucklow.

== In popular culture ==
The painting is part of the plot in the 2022 novel A World of Curiosities by Louise Penny.

== See also ==
- Representation of slavery in European art
