= Charles Paston, Lord Paston =

English politician (1673–1718)

Charles Paston, Lord Paston (29 May 1673 – 15 December 1718) was an English politician.

== Early life and family ==
Paston was the eldest son of William Paston, 2nd Earl of Yarmouth and Charlotte Paston, Countess of Yarmouth, the illegitimate daughter of Charles II and Elizabeth Killigrew. He was educated at Eton College between 1686 and 1690. His father was an impoverished former favourite of the exiled king, James II, and was imprisoned twice as a suspected Jacobite.

== Career ==
Paston stood for election in Norfolk in 1690, but was defeated, coming last of all candidates. Despite his father's estrangement from court, Paston's personal connections with the Earl of Portland enabled him to attend court in January 1694 when he swore loyalty to William and Mary. Later in 1694, Paston attended on Portland during his embassy in Paris and he obtained a commission in the Life Guards the same year.

Paston stood again for election in 1698, but was again defeated. However, when Joseph Williamson vacated his Thetford seat in 1699, Paston was chosen in his place. In 1699 he was appointed Vice-Admiral of Norfolk for life. He was again defeated at the following election in 1700.

In 1704 he left the Life Guards and became the colonel of a regiment of infantry. In April 1705, bailiffs attempted unsuccessfully to arrest Paston as a result of his association with his father's debts. He sold his regiment in 1710; he was in receipt of a pension by 1716, and was twice given ex gratia payments from George I's civil list, to meet "his present necessities". On 31 August 1711 he had married Elizabeth Pitt, with whom he had one daughter. He predeceased his father in 1718; as a result, the Earl of Yarmouth's title became extinct upon his death in 1732.

Parliament of England
Preceded by James Sloane; Joseph Williamson	Member of Parliament for Thetford; 1699–1700; With: James Sloane	Succeeded by Joseph Williamson; Edmund Soame
Honorary titles
Vacant Title last held by Sir Henry Hobart, Bt	Vice-Admiral of Norfolk; 1699–1718	Succeeded by The Earl of Yarmouth
