= Guy Holland =

Guy Holland may refer to:

- Guy Holland (darts player), who participated at the 2012 PDC World Youth Championship
- Sir Guy Hope Holland, 3rd Baronet (1918-1997) of the Holland baronets
