= Robert Paston, 1st Earl of Yarmouth =

English politician and scientist

The Right Honourable The Earl of Yarmouth FRS
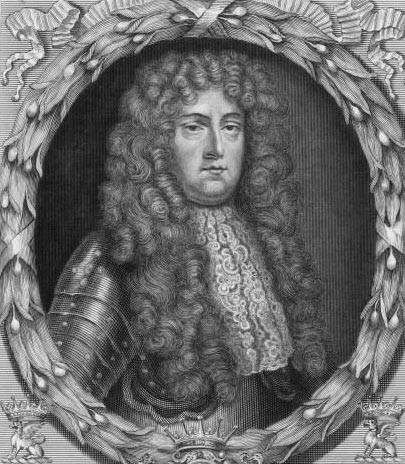
- The Earl of Yarmouth, by Burnet Reading

Member of the England Parliament for Castle Rising
- In office 1661–1673 Serving with: Robert Steward (1661–1673); Sir John Trevor (1673)
- Preceded by: Sir John Holland; John Spelman
- Succeeded by: Sir John Trevor; Samuel Pepys

Member of the England Parliament for Thetford
- In office 1660–1661 Serving with Sir Philip Wodehouse
- Preceded by: Robert Steward; William Stene
- Succeeded by: Sir Allen Apsley; William Gawdy

Personal details
- Born: Robert Paston; 3 May 1631
- Died: 8 March 1683 (aged 51)
- Spouse: Rebecca Clayton (m. 1650)
- Children: 9, including William and Margaret
- Parents: Sir William Paston, 1st Baronet; Katherine Bertie

Robert Paston, 1st Earl of Yarmouth, FRS (29 May 1631 – 8 March 1683) was an English scientist and politician who sat in the House of Commons between 1660 and 1673 when he was created Viscount Yarmouth. He was created Earl of Yarmouth in 1679.

== Life ==
Paston was the son of Sir William Paston, 1st Baronet of Oxnead and his first wife, Lady Katherine Bertie, daughter of Robert Bertie, 1st Earl of Lindsey. He was educated at Westminster School and was a student of Trinity College, Cambridge in 1646. He travelled abroad in France. In 1660 he was elected Member of Parliament (MP) for Thetford in the Convention Parliament. He was knighted on 27 May 1660.

In 1661, Paston was elected MP for Castle Rising and sat until 1673, when he had to relinquish his seat on being raised to the peerage as Viscount Yarmouth. He had inherited the baronetcy on the death of his father in 1663. He was appointed Lord Lieutenant of Norfolk on 6 March 1676, retaining the office until his death. He was created the 1st Earl of Yarmouth in 1679.

Following the creation of the Royal Society in 1660, he was accepted as an Original Fellow on 20 May 1663. With another Fellow, Thomas Henshaw, he attempted to discover a formula for the fabled "red elixir", another name for the philosopher's stone which alchemists believed could transmute base metals into gold. In a letter to Sir Thomas Browne he informed the Norwich physician-philosopher of his alchemical experiments -

I have at Oxnead seen this salt change black as ink, I must, at the lowest, have an excellent aurum potable, and if the signs we are to judge in Sendivogius’ description be true, I have the key which answers to what he says, that if a man has that which will disolve [sic?] gold as warm water doth ice, you have that which gold was first made in the earth.

Paston lived at Richmond. In May 1666, he wrote a letter to his wife mentioning "a game of criquett on Richmond Green", the first known reference to cricket at Richmond Green.

There is a painting in the Norwich Castle Museum, of Robert Paston and his father William's artefact collection known as The Paston Treasure.

== Family ==
Paston married Rebecca Clayton, daughter of Sir Jasper Clayton, Haberdasher, of London on 15 June 1650. They had six sons and three daughters. Rebecca died on 16 February 1694.

Their son, William, married Lady Charlotte Fitzroy, an illegitimate daughter of Charles II. Both Robert and his son were in high favour with the Stuarts.

== Arms ==
Coat of arms of Robert Paston, 1st Earl of Yarmouth
Crest A Griffin sejant wings endorsed Or collared Gules Escutcheon Argent six Fleur-de-lis three two and one Azure a Chief indented Or Supporters Dexter: a Bear Sable muzzled collared and chained Or; Sinister: an Ostrich Argent holding in the beak a Horseshoe Or Motto De mieulx je pense en mieulx(The best I think the best)

== See also ==
- Oxnead
- Paston, Norfolk
- The Paston Treasure

Parliament of England
Preceded by Robert Steward; William Stene	Member of Parliament for Thetford; 1660 (April); With: Sir Philip Wodehouse, Bt	Succeeded by Sir Allen Apsley; William Gawdy
Preceded by Sir John Holland, Bt; John Spelman	Member of Parliament for Castle Rising; 1661–1673; With: Robert Steward 1661–1673; Sir John Trevor 1673	Succeeded by Sir John Trevor; Samuel Pepys
Honorary titles
Preceded by The Viscount Townshend	Lord Lieutenant of Norfolk; 1676–1683	Succeeded by Earl of Arundel and Surrey
Preceded by The Viscount Townshend	Vice-Admiral of Norfolk; 1676–1683	Vacant Title next held by Sir Henry Hobart
Peerage of England
New creation	Earl of Yarmouth; 1679–1683	Succeeded by William Paston
New creation	Viscount Yarmouth; 1673–1683	Succeeded by William Paston
Baronetage of England
Preceded by William Paston	Baronet (of Paston and Oxnead, Norfolk); 1663–1683	Succeeded by William Paston
