= Holland baronets of Quiddenham (1629) =

Escutcheon of the Holland baronets of Quiddenham

The Holland baronetcy, of Quiddenham in the County of Norfolk, was created in the Baronetage of England on 15 June 1629 for John Holland. He represented Norfolk, Castle Rising and Aldborough in the House of Commons.

The 2nd Baronet sat as Member of Parliament for Norfolk. The title became extinct on the death of the 3rd Baronet in 1729.

== Holland baronets, of Quiddenham (1629) ==
- Sir John Holland, 1st Baronet (1603–1701)
- Sir John Holland, 2nd Baronet (c. 1669 – c. 1724)
- Sir William Holland, 3rd Baronet (1700–1729)
