= Paston & Knapton railway station =

Disused railway station in Norfolk, England

Paston and Knapton
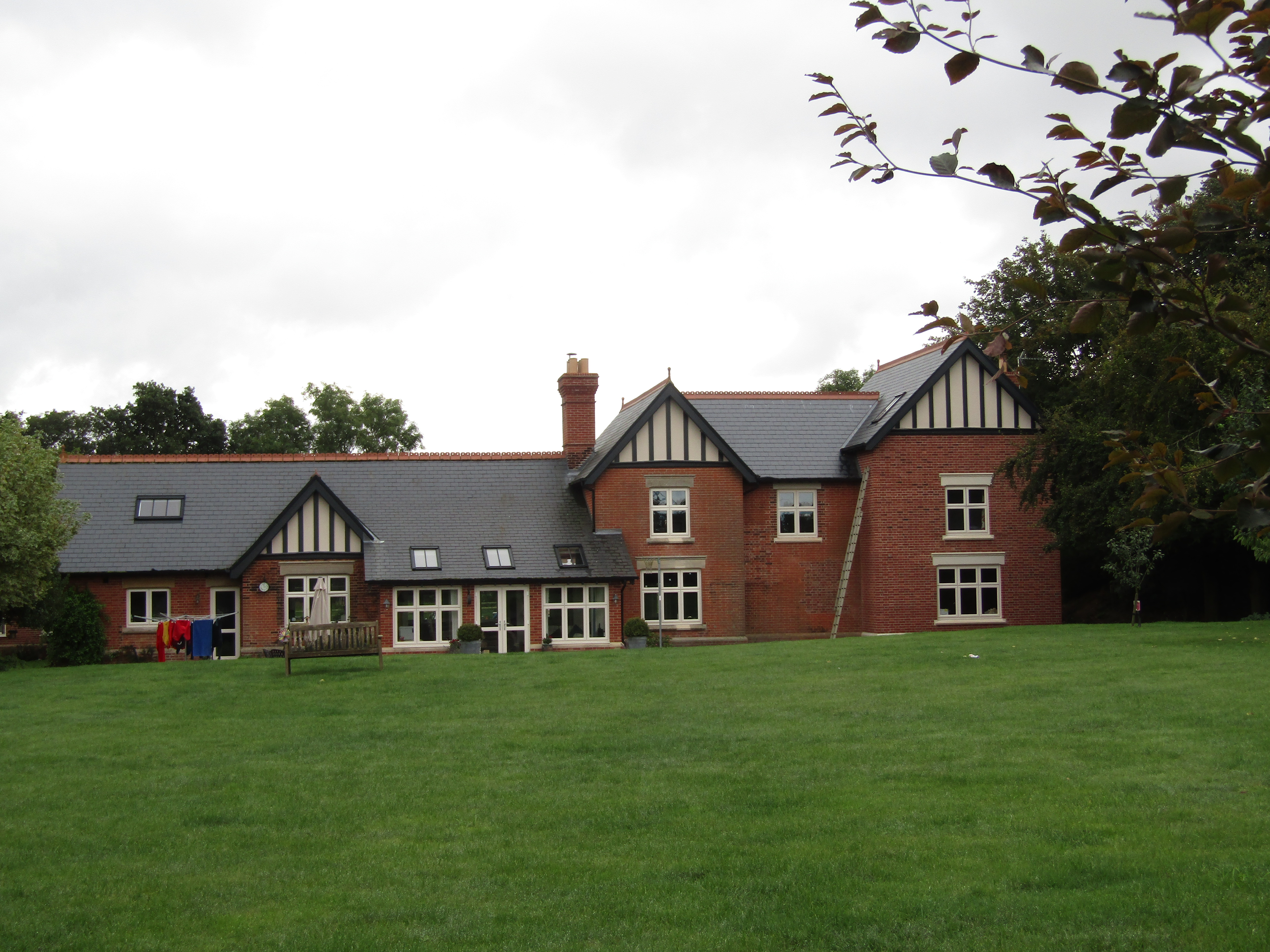

General information
- Location: Knapton, North Norfolk, Norfolk; England
- Coordinates: 52.8529°N 1.4297°E
- Grid reference: TG310339
- Platforms: 1

Other information
- Status: Disused

History
- Original company: Norfolk and Suffolk Joint Railway
- Pre-grouping: Norfolk and Suffolk Joint Railway
- Post-grouping: Norfolk and Suffolk Joint Railway; Eastern Region of British Railways

Key dates
- 1 July 1898: Opened
- 5 October 1964: Closed
Location

Paston and Knapton railway station was a station in North Norfolk on the Norfolk and Suffolk Joint Railway line between Cromer Beach and North Walsham. It served the settlements of Paston and Knapton, through it was nearer to the latter. It closed on 5 October 1964 to passengers and to goods on 28 December 1964.

Preceding station	Disused railways	Following station
Mundesley-on-Sea	Norfolk and Suffolk; Cromer Line	North Walsham Town
