= John Paston =

John Paston may refer to:

- John Paston (died 1466) (1421–1466), of the Paston Letters, father
- John Paston (died 1479) (1442–1479), of the Paston Letters, first son
- John Paston (died 1504) (1444–1504), of the Paston Letters, second son

== See also ==
- Paston (disambiguation)
