= Carole Walker =

British political news correspondent

Carole Walker is a British political news correspondent and radio presenter. She worked at the BBC until the end of March 2017, before returning as a freelance presenter on the news channel. She presents a late night programme on Times Radio.

== Biography ==
Walker attended North Walsham Girls' High School in Norfolk, attached to the all-male Paston College. She subsequently studied journalism at the London College of Printing.

At the BBC, Walker often fronted major events such as British general elections.

She worked for the BBC for more than 30 years. As a war correspondent she covered the fall of the Soviet Union, the Gulf War and the civil wars in Somalia and the Balkans. Since 1997, she concentrated on covering UK politics and in September 2012 presented the BBC Two daily political programme Daily Politics.

In April 2011, when she was 50, Walker openly criticised the then BBC director general Mark Thompson for failing to curb the corporation's alleged "ageist" attitude towards women. In the BBC's in-house magazine, Ariel, Walker asserted that Thompson had broken his pledge to give her more presenting shifts.

In June 2020, she joined the newly-launched digital radio station Times Radio, presenting editions of the late evening show.

== Books ==
- Keighron, Peter, and Carole Walker. "Working in Television: Five Interviews." In, Hood, Stuart, editor. Behind the Screens: The Structure of British Television in the Nineties. London: Lawrence & Wishart, 1994.

== See also ==
- List of current BBC newsreaders and reporters
