= Soame baronets =

Extinct baronetcy in the Baronetage of England

- Escutcheon of the Soame baronets of Thurlow
- Creation date: 1684
- Status: extinct
- Extinction date: 1798

The Soame Baronetcy, of Thurlow in the County of Suffolk, was a title in the Baronetage of England. It was created on 5 February 1685 for William Soame, with a special reminder, failing issue male of his body, to his father's first cousin Peter Soame. The title became extinct on the death of the fourth Baronet in 1798. He devised his estates to Sir Buckworth Buckworth-Herne, 6th Baronet, of Sheen, who assumed the additional surname of Soame in 1806 (see Buckworth-Herne-Soame baronets).

== Soame baronets, of Thurlow (1685) ==
- Sir William Soame, 1st Baronet (c. 1645–1686)
- Sir Peter Soame, 2nd Baronet (1634–c. 1693)
- Sir Peter Soame, 3rd Baronet (c. 1675–1709)
- Sir Peter Soame, 4th Baronet (c. 1707–1798)

== See also ==
- Buckworth-Herne-Soame baronets
