= Paston, Norfolk =

Village in Norfolk, England

Coordinates: 52.85781°N 01.44985°E

Paston
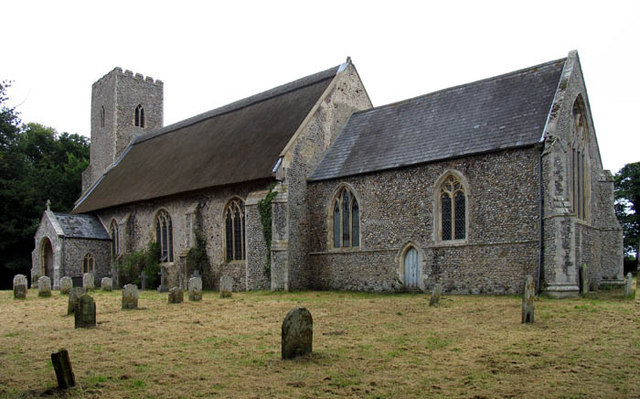
- The Parish Church of Saint Margaret.

- Location within Norfolk
- Area: 5.66 km^{2} (2.19 sq mi)
- Population: 239 (parish, 2011 census)
  - Density: 42/km^{2} (110/sq mi)
- OS grid reference: TG275387
  - London: 139 miles (224 km)
- Civil parish: Paston
- District: North Norfolk
- Shire county: Norfolk
- Region: East
- Country: England
- Sovereign state: United Kingdom
- Post town: NORTH WALSHAM
- Postcode district: NR28
- Dialling code: 01263
- Police: Norfolk
- Fire: Norfolk
- Ambulance: East of England
- UK Parliament: North Norfolk

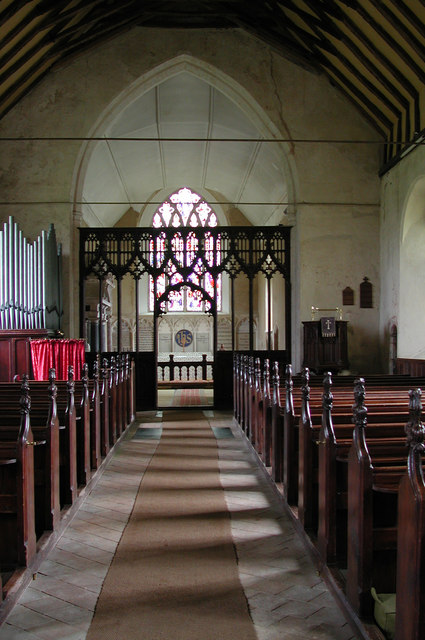
Interior of St Margaret's Church, Paston

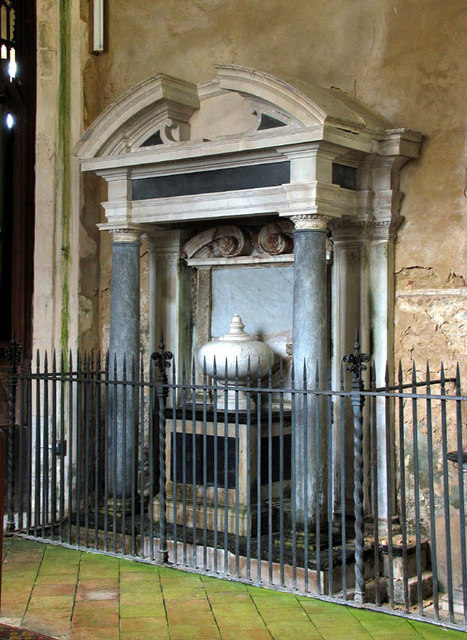
Monument of Sir Edmund Paston (d.1632), St Margaret's Church, Paston, designed by Nicholas Stone

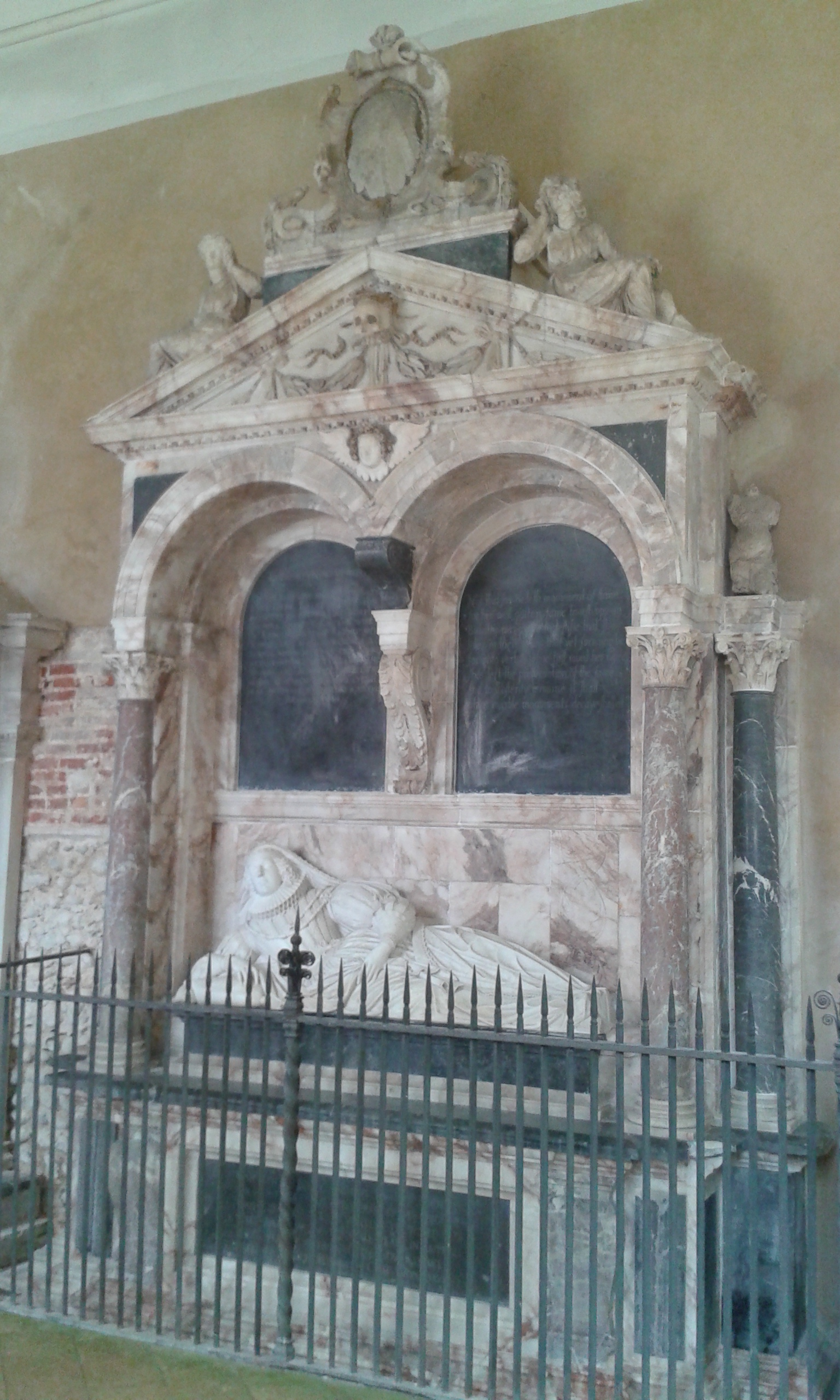
Monument of Katherine Knevet (d.1628), wife of Sir Edmund Paston (d.1632), St Margaret's Church, Paston, designed by Nicholas Stone

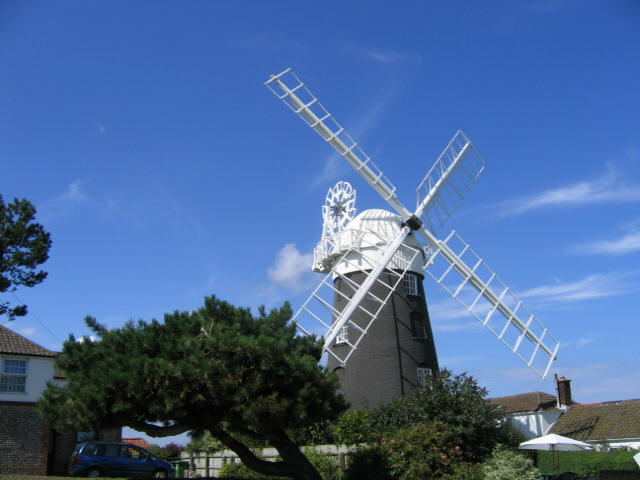
Stow Mill, Paston

Paston is a village and civil parish in the English county of Norfolk. The village is 4 miles (6.4 km) north-east of North Walsham and 9.1 miles (14.6 km) south-east of Cromer. It is 19.2 miles (30.9 km) north-east of the city of Norwich. The village sits astride the coast road between Mundesley and Bacton. The nearest railway station is at North Walsham for the Bittern Line which runs between Sheringham, Cromer and Norwich. The nearest airport is Norwich International.

The village gives its name to the Pastonian Stage, a British regional subdivision of the Pleistocene Epoch. The village was served by Paston & Knapton railway station on the North Walsham to Cromer section of the Norfolk and Suffolk Joint Railway from 1881 until 1964.

== History ==
The manor of Paston is listed in the Domesday Book of 1086 as Pastuna from the Roman name Terra Pastorini ("Shepherds' Land"), one of the many English holdings of William de Warenne, 1st Earl of Surrey. The listing mentions the church and a mill. From about 1400, it was dominated by the de Paston family (later Paston), who had taken their surname from their seat. Clement Paston was sufficiently wealthy to have his son William Paston (1378–1444) educated as a lawyer and he later become a judge. The family went on to acquire lands throughout the county of Norfolk and became wealthy and part of the county gentry. Indeed, there is an old saying in Norfolk that "There was never a Paston poor, a Heydon a coward or a Cornwallis a fool". The Paston family are remembered today mostly for the Paston Letters, a rare surviving collection of fifteenth-century private and business letters. In 1597, Sir William Paston (1528–1610) moved the main family seat to Oxnead. The last Paston in the male line was William Paston, 2nd Earl of Yarmouth (d.1732). The Paston estate was then acquired by Baron Anson, passing in the early nineteenth century to the Mack family.

Archaeological test pits were dug in 2012. The report was published online.

== Parish church of Saint Margaret ==
The parish church of Saint Margaret dates from the 14th century and is constructed from flint. English Heritage has given it Grade I listed building status. It has an embattled tower which looks down on a thatched roof. The porch is on the south side and opens into a plain nave and chancel which is divided by a 15th-century rood screen. The church has been restored three times, in 1601, 1843 and 1869. In 1922 medieval wall paintings were uncovered, one depicting Saint Christopher carrying the Christ child, another depicting the legend of the three kings who, when hunting merrily in the forest, suddenly encountered three hanging skeletons. There is also a small figure from a 'weighing of souls' and the remains of some post-Reformation texts.

The Paston family monuments are situated at the eastern end of the building. That of Katherine Knevet/Knyvett (d.1628) (the wife of Sir Edmund Paston (d.1632)) stands on the north side of the chancel. This was created by Nicholas Stone, master-mason to King Charles I, who was frequently employed by the Paston family. It includes a verse epitaph written by the famous metaphysical poet John Donne, Dean of St Paul's Cathedral in the City of London. The monument is made of alabaster and pink-veined marble and features a semi-recumbent effigy of Lady Paston sculpted in white marble and surrounded by numerous allegorical figures. Stone also designed the adjoining monument to her husband Sir Edmund Paston (d.1632), comprising a plain urn on a bare base in an aedicule of black Doric columns. Pevsner commented: "the contrast between the severity of the one and the ebullience of the other is startling". The chancel also contains three chest tombs, the one at the eastern end probably of John Paston (d.1466) who was originally buried in Bromholm Priory following a magnificent funeral at which were consumed forty barrels of ale.

Surviving monuments to the Mack family include stained glass windows and memorial plaques within the nave. The east window in memory of John Mack (d.1867) of Paston Hall was made by the firm of Clayton and Bell. The south window next to the doorway of the rood loft is dedicated to Lt Cdr Ralph Michael Mack of the Royal Navy who went down with his ship HMS Tornado off the Dutch coast in 1917.

== The Paston Family ==
Bridget Paston, granddaughter of Sir William Paston (1434–1496) and wife of Sir Edward Coke

The village is best known for its association with the Paston family, who resided in an earlier building on the site of the present Paston Hall. The family is most noted for the Paston Letters, a collection of letters and papers, consisting of the correspondence of members of the family, and others connected with them, between 1422 and 1509, and including some state papers and other important documents. Most of the Paston letters and associated documents are now in the British Library, but a few are in the Bodleian Library, Oxford, at Magdalen College, Oxford, and at Pembroke College, Cambridge.

In a letter dated 4 February 1445, Agnes Paston, the widow of William Paston, advised her son Edmond Paston (1425–49) 'to think once of the day of your father's advice to learn the law; for he said many times that whosoever should dwell at Paston should have need to con defend himself'. The letter goes on to list several disputes with neighbours. One of these was with the vicar of Paston concerning William's diversion of a highway from the south to the north side of Paston Hall, situated next to the church. This perhaps helps to explain why today the lychgate entrance to the church stands on a small path to Paston Hall rather than on the road to the north. The dispute continued for a few years and in about 1451 Agnes wrote to another son, John Paston (1421–66), to tell him how an argument broke out on the subject after evensong on the Sunday before St Edmund's Day (i.e. in mid November). She was in the church when a certain Clement Spicer came up to her and demanded to know why she had closed the king's way. Warren Harman, who had been leaning over the parclose screen and listening, then intervened, condemning the 'ruely change' and saying the 'town' was £100 worse off as a result. Agnes told him to mind his own business, but he followed her out into the churchyard and said that he would have 20 nobles off her for closing the road and would open it again. Agnes warned that he would have to pay for his actions if he did. The row then moved on to whether Agnes had taken too much hay from land she let to Harman at North Walsham. Bidding her to take no more than four acres, he strode off.

Life in Paston at this time was dangerous because of raids from the sea by French ships. Agnes, in another letter to John Paston dated 11 March 1450 and written at Norwich, reports that Richard Lynsted had been to see her from Paston that day and had let her know that Warren Harman's half-brother had been 'taken with enemies' while walking along the sea side. Two pilgrims, a man and a woman, had also been attacked. The woman was robbed but allowed to go. The man was led down to the sea but when he managed to convince the raiders that he was indeed a pilgrim, they gave him money and put him back on land. Agnes also mentions that the pirates 'have thys weke takyn iiij (4) vessellys of Wyntyrton and Happysborough, and Ecles men been sore aferd for takyn of mo, for there ben x (10) grete vessellys of the enemyis'.

== Paston Hall ==
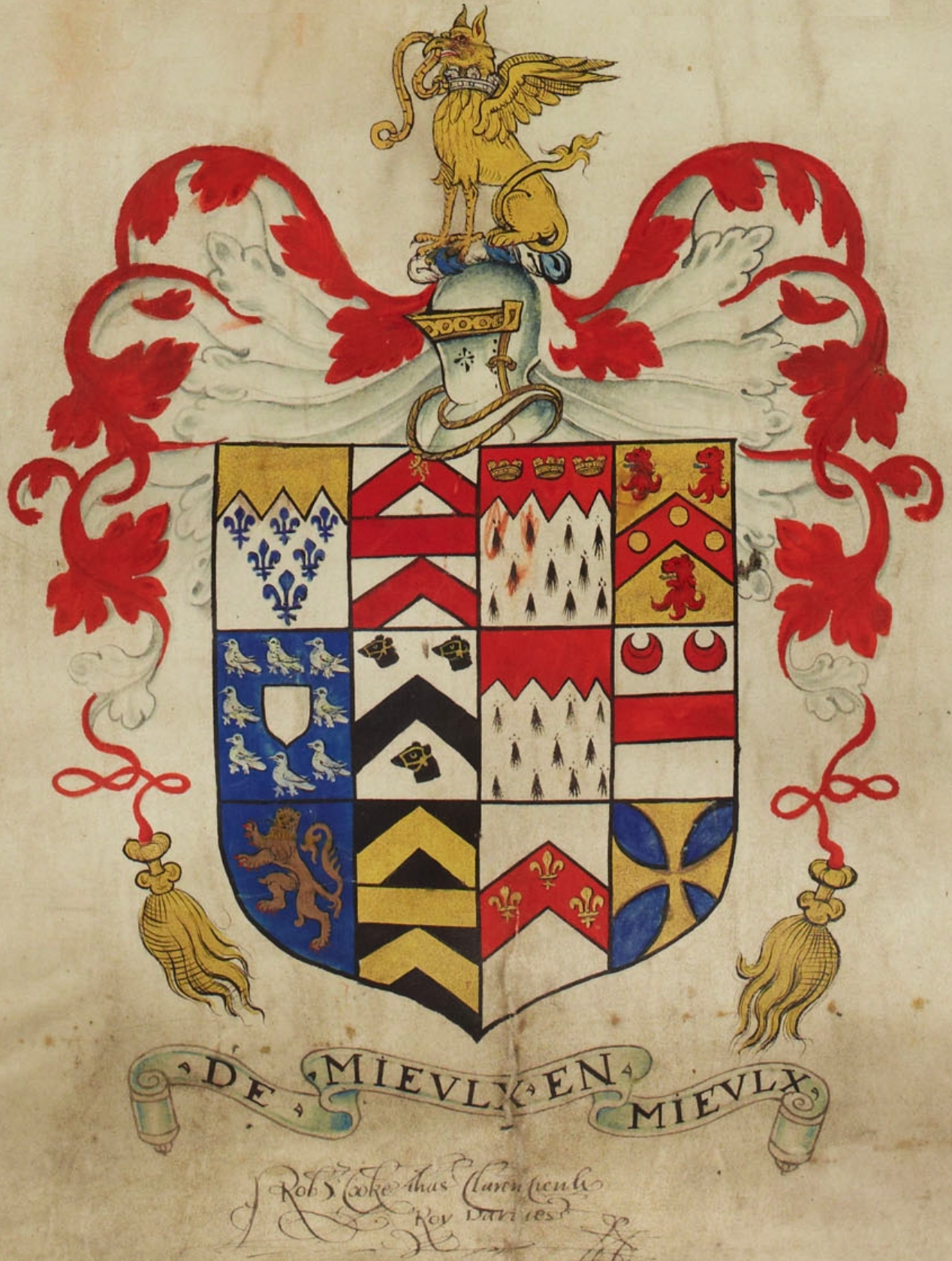
1573 illustration of Paston arms, of 12 quarters. 6th quarter: canting arms of Barre/Barrey/Berry (Argent, a chevron between three bear's heads couped at the neck sable muzzled and collared or)

The original Paston Hall was built by William Paston (1378–1444) and was partly destroyed by fire during the reign of King Henry VIII (1509–1547) and was replaced by a 'great rose-coloured mansion' that appears in a portrait of Sir William Paston (1528–1610). According to Blomefield's History of Norfolk (1739/75) the new building had two court-yards, the inner one containing a well. Blomefield reported that the great hall was still standing but the chambers and chapel were in ruins. The canting arms of the Barre/Barrey/Berry family (Argent, a chevron between three bear's heads couped at the neck sable muzzled and collared or) could still be seen carved over a doorway, symbolising the 1420 marriage of William Paston of Paston, Judge, son and heir of Clement Paston and Beatrix Somerton, to Agnes Barrey, a daughter and co-heiress of Sir Edmund Barrey.

In the eighteenth century Baron Anson acquired the estate from the impecunious William Paston, 2nd Earl of Yarmouth, and rebuilt the manor house on the same site. The remnants of the old house were left standing. An account written in 1796 states that the ruins stood at the east side of the courtyard with new domestic rooms on the north and south sides and a turreted gateway on the west. The gateway was described as being built of flint with quoins of freestone, with extensive cellars. An engraving of 1823 shows several polygonal chambers; excavations carried out in 1900 revealed the foundations of a hexagonal chamber. In 1824 John Mack acquired the estate and built the surviving house which incorporates parts of the Anson house and the Tudor cellars.

At various times Paston Hall has been surrounded by outhouses, shrubberies, orchards and lawns. To the south east is a small field known as the 'Duffus', which was the site of a medieval dovecote reached by a path along a double hawthorn hedge.

== Paston Great Tithe Barn ==
The tithe barn was built by Sir William Paston (1528–1610), the founder of the Paston Grammar School in North Walsham, in 1581 and was used to store and thresh corn. The barn is constructed of flint and brick with an alternate tie and hammerbeam roof, which is thatched. The barn is 160 feet (49 m) long and 24 feet (7.3 m) wide; to the apex the height is 60 feet (18 m). It has Grade II* listed building status. Pevsner remarks that the roof span does not require hammer beams and that “they are here for show: the Renaissance magnate's love of bravado and expression of wealth”.

== Stow Mill ==
Just on the Paston side of the boundary with Mundesley stands Stow Mill. This is a tarred brick tower windmill built between 1825 and 1827 by James Gaze. The mill operated as a flour mill between 1828 and 1930. The mill is a Grade II listed building.

== See also ==
- Paston Letters
- Paston Great Barn
- Robert Paston, 1st Earl of Yarmouth
- William Paston, 2nd Earl of Yarmouth
- Paston & Knapton railway station
- Bromholm Priory
- Bacton Gas Terminal
- Oxnead

== Bibliography ==
- Bennett, Henry S (1932) The Pastons and their England: Studies in an Age of Transition, Cambridge, Cambridge University Press (2nd edition)
- Davis, Norman (1971) Paston Letters and Papers of the Fifteenth Century – Part I, Oxford, The Clarendon Press ISBN 0-19-812415-5
- Davis, Norman (1983) The Paston Letters, Oxford, The World's Classics: Oxford University Press ISBN 0-19-281615-2
- Hinde, Thomas (ed.) (1996) The Domesday Book: England's Heritage Then and Now, London, Colour Library Direct Ltd ISBN 1-85833-440-3
- Hughey, Ruth (ed.) (1941) 'The Correspondence of Lady Katherine Paston 1603–1627', Norfolk Record Society, xiv 1941
- Ketton-Cremer, R. W. (1969) Norfolk in the Civil War, London, Faber and Faber
- Lorraine, Herbert (undated), Paston: Some Notes on the Church of St Margaret and the Paston Family; this version published by Paston Parochial Church Council; originally published in 1949 at North Walsham by Rounce and Wortley
- Mee, Arthur (1974) Norfolk (King's England), London, Hodder and Stoughton ISBN 0-340-15061-0
- Pevsner, Nikolaus and Wilson, Bill (1997) The Buildings of England: Norfolk 1: Norwich and the North-East, London, Penguin Books ISBN 0-14-071058-2
- Yaxley, David (1977) Portrait of Norfolk, Norwich, Robert Hale Ltd ISBN 0-7091-6267-7
