= List of vice-admirals of Norfolk =

This is a list of people who have served as Vice-Admiral of the Coast of Norfolk. Prior to 1594 the office holder was also Vice-Admiral of Suffolk.

- Sir William Gonson 1536–1544
- Sir William Woodhouse 1554–1564 (MP for Great Yarmouth) jointly with
- Sir Thomas Woodhouse 1554–1572 (MP for Great Yarmouth) and
- Henry Woodhouse 1563–1579
- William Heydon 1579–? jointly with
- Christopher Heydon 1579–?
- Sir Robert Southwell 1585–1597
- Thomas Talbot 1597–1600
- Sir Robert Mansell 1600–1618
- Sir Thomas Southwell 1618–1635
- Henry Howard, Lord Maltravers 1635–1642?
- vacant
- Edwin Rich 1644–1649 (Parliamentary)
- vacant
- Horatio Townshend, 1st Baron Townshend 1663–1676
- Robert Paston, 1st Earl of Yarmouth 1676–1683
- vacant
- Sir Henry Hobart, 4th Baronet 1691–1698
- Charles Paston, Lord Paston 1699–1718
- William Paston, 2nd Earl of Yarmouth 1719
- John Hobart, 1st Earl of Buckinghamshire 1719–1756
- George Walpole, 3rd Earl of Orford 1757–1791
- George Townshend, 1st Marquess Townshend 1792–1807
- vacant
- William Harbord, 2nd Baron Suffield 1809–1821
- John Wodehouse, 2nd Baron Wodehouse 1822–1846
