= George Scott-Chad =

English cricketer and British Army officer

Personal information
- Full name: George Norman Scott-Chad
- Born: 1 November 1899; Kensington, London, England
- Died: 4 July 1950 (aged 50); Paddington, London, England
- Batting: Right-handed
- Bowling: Unknown

Domestic team information
- Years: Team
- 1920–1932: Norfolk

Career statistics
Competition	First-class
Matches	3
Runs scored	49
Batting average	9.80
100s/50s	–/–
Top score	24
Balls bowled	438
Wickets	6
Bowling average	35.50
5 wickets in innings	–
10 wickets in match	–
Best bowling	2/43
Catches/stumpings	4/–
- Source: Cricinfo, 16 April 2019

George Norman Scott-Chad (1 November 1899 – 4 July 1950) was an English first-class cricketer and British Army officer. Scott-Chad served with both the Coldstream Guards and the Royal Norfolk Regiment, in a military career which spanned nearly thirty years. He also played first-class cricket for the British Army cricket team and served as the High Sheriff of Norfolk.

== Life and military career ==
The son of the footballer and barrister Charles Scott-Chad, he was born at Kensington and educated at Eton College. From Eton he attended the Royal Military College, Sandhurst, graduating as a second lieutenant into the Coldstream Guards in December 1919. He made his debut in minor counties cricket for Norfolk in the 1920 Minor Counties Championship. He made his debut in first-class cricket for the British Army cricket team against Oxford University at Oxford in 1923. He made a further two first-class appearances for the Army in 1924, playing against Cambridge University and Oxford University. In his three first-class matches, Scott-Chad scored 49 runs with a high score of 24. As a bowler, he took 6 wickets at an average of 35.50, with best figures of 2 for 43. He was promoted to the rank of lieutenant in August 1929. He retired from the Coldstream Guards in May 1930, upon which he received a gratuity. He toured the West Indies with Lord Tennyson's XI in February/March 1932, but did not feature in any of the three first-class fixtures on the tour. Later that same year he played his final minor counties match for Norfolk, having made a total of 40 appearances in the Minor Counties Championship since his debut in 1920.

He later returned to military service with the Royal Norfolk Regiment, with promotion to the rank of captain in December 1936. He was promoted to the rank of lieutenant colonel in June 1939. After serving in the Second World War, he was nominated for role of High Sheriff of Norfolk in November 1947, alongside Ion Benn and Sir Edmund Bacon. He was successful in his nomination and served as High Sheriff in 1948. Besides cricket, he was also a skilled racquets and squash racquets player who won the army championship five times in succession and retired from military service unbeaten. Scott-Chad died at St Mary's Hospital in Paddington in July 1950.
