= Sir John Holland, 1st Baronet =

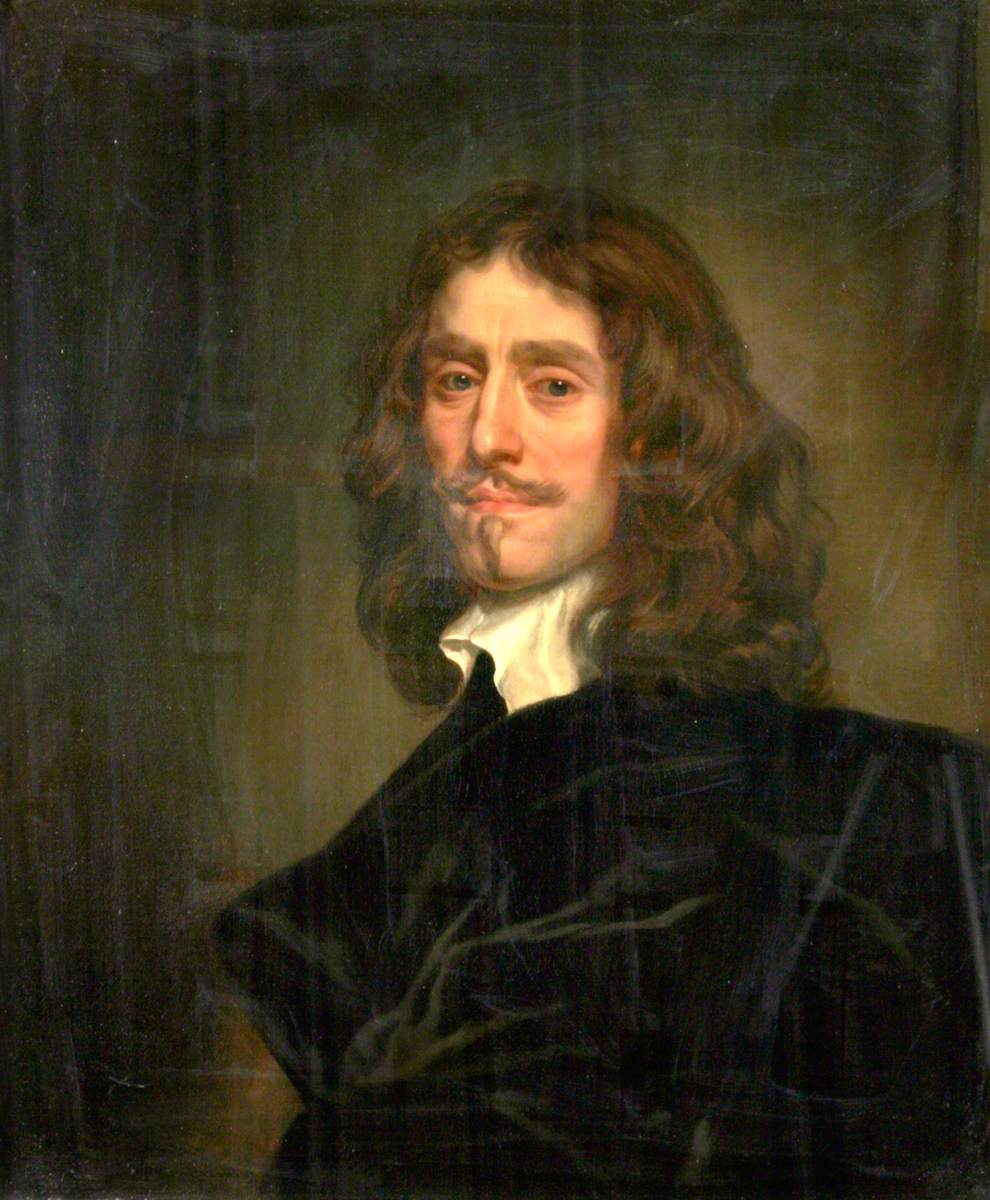
Sir John Holland, 1st Baronet by Peter Lely

Sir John Holland, 1st Baronet (October 1603 – 19 January 1701) was an English politician who sat in the House of Commons at various times between 1640 and 1679.

Holland was the son of Sir Thomas Holland of Quiddenham, Norfolk and his wife Mary Knyvet, daughter of Sir Thomas Knyvet. He was created a baronet, of Quiddenham by King Charles 1 on 15 June 1629.

In April 1640, Holland was elected Member of Parliament for Norfolk in the Short Parliament. His fellow parliamentarians asked Holland to rid his house of any Catholics, but he refused. He offered his wife, Alathea Panton, religious freedom but he took great but unsuccessful efforts to try and ensure that his children were all Protestants.

In November 1640 he was elected MP Castle Rising in the Long Parliament and held the seat until he was excluded in Pride's Purge in 1648. Holland was re-elected for Castle Rising in the Convention Parliament in 1660. In 1661 he was elected MP for Aldeburgh in the Cavalier Parliament and held the seat to 1679.

Holland died on 19 January 1701, aged 96.

== Private life ==
Holland married a Catholic, Alathea Panton, daughter of John Panton of Bruinshop, Denbighshire, and widow of William, Lord Sandys, of the Vine. Their daughter, Catherine, was born in 1637 and struggled against her father's wish that she should be a Protestant. She became a nun, noted in Bruges. Their son, Thomas, predeceased him, and he was succeeded in the baronetcy by his grandson, Sir John Holland, 2nd Baronet.

Parliament of England
Parliament suspended since 1629	Member of Parliament for Norfolk; 1640; With: Sir Edmund Moundeford	Succeeded by Sir John Potts, 1st Baronet; Sir Edmund Moundeford
Preceded by Thomas Talbot; Nicholas Harman	Member of Parliament for Castle Rising; 1640–1648; With: John Spelman	Not represented in restored Rump
Not represented in restored Rump	Member of Parliament for Castle Rising; 1660; With: John Spelman	Succeeded by Sir Robert Paston; Robert Steward
Preceded by Sir Robert Brooke; Thomas Bacon	Member of Parliament for Aldeburgh; 1661–1679; With: Robert Brooke to 1669; John Bence from 1669	Succeeded by Sir Richard Haddock; Henry Johnson
Baronetage of England
New creation	Baronet (of Quiddenham); 1629–1701	Succeeded by John Holland
