= Sir William Soame, 1st Baronet =

English translator and diplomat

Sir William Soame, 1st Baronet (also Soames) (c.1645–1686) was an English translator and diplomat.

== Life ==
The Soame family was based in East Anglia, and in the commercial world of London, where Stephen Soame had been Lord Mayor. Soame was his great-grandson, second son of Stephen Soame of Little Thurlow; his mother was Mary Dynham, daughter of Sir John Dynham of Borstall, who had previously been married to Lawrence Banastre. He was admitted a fellow commoner of St John's College, Cambridge in 1660.

Soame was High Sheriff of Suffolk in 1672–3. The office brought him into conflict with Sir Samuel Barnardiston, 1st Baronet over the handling of the by-election for Suffolk caused by the suicide of Sir Henry North, 1st Baronet. Sir Samuel was a relation, being a grandson of Stephen Soame. He was also an opponent of the court, and Soame sent in a double electoral return when Sir Samuel stood as candidate, against Lionel Tollemache (courtesy title Lord Huntingtower), one return discounting many of his supporters. The matter was pursued vigorously through the courts, as a vendetta, by Sir Samuel Barnardiston, even after Soame's death against his widow. Soame was knighted in 1674.

Soame was an envoy to the Savoyard state, around 1680. He was created a baronet by Charles II in 1685. A Fellow of the Royal Society, he was allowed to retain his membership in that year, despite being in arrears with his subscription.

Made Ambassador to the Ottoman Empire, Soame died on Malta in June 1686, having called at Algiers and Tunis to renew treaty agreements. His appointment had been political, going back to the Oxford Parliament of 1681. James Brydges had been the choice of the Levant Company, but Charles II took against his political sympathies, and imposed Soame by prerogative in 1684.

== Works ==
Soame made a translation, The Art of Poetry, of Nicolas Boileau's L'Art poétique. According to Jacob Tonson, it dated from 1680. It was later revised by John Dryden, and published in 1683. The Dryden revisions included substitutions, for example Thomas Duffett for Charles Coypeau d'Assoucy in speaking about burlesque, and Samuel Butler for Clément Marot; Ben Jonson replaces Molière. A derived work was published by John Ozell in 1712. Another version from Charles Gildon's The Complete Art of Poetry (1718) changed Thomas Randolph to Thomas D'Urfey to remain topical.

== Family ==
Soame married Lady Beata Pope, daughter of Thomas Pope, 3rd Earl of Downe (connecting Soame with Francis North, 1st Baron Guilford who married another daughter); and then Mary Howe, daughter of Sir Gabriel Howe. He died without issue. His kinsman Peter Soame became 2nd Baronet, by special remainder. Little Thurlow went to his uncle Bartholomew Hunt, a patron of John Howe.

== Notes ==
Baronetage of the United Kingdom
New creation	Baronet (of Thurlow); 1685–1686	Succeeded by Peter Soame
