= Catherine Holland =

- Born: 1637
- Died: 6 January 1720 (aged 82–83); Bruges

Catherine Holland (1637 – 6 January 1720) was an English Roman Catholic convert, a nun, and an autobiographer.

== Life ==
Holland was born in 1637 to Sir John Holland and Lady Holland (nee Lady Alathea Sandys). She had four sisters and six brothers. The family seat was Quidenham Hall in Norfolk. Her mother had been married before to William Sandys, the fourth Baron Sandys. Holland was a Catholic Welsh heiress while her father was a Protestant who had been knighted in 1629. He became a member of parliament in 1640 for Castle Rising in Norfolk.

Holland was born in England but lived in Bergen op Zoom from 1641-1652, along with other members of her family.

Her father was asked by his fellow members of parliament to get rid of any Catholic members in his household. He objected to this request, knowing that his wife was Catholic and pointed out that people were entitled to follow the Catholic faith in England. Although he allowed Lady Holland freedom of religion, he made every effort to raise his children as Protestants of the Church of England. He made Catherine copy sermons and learn catechisms. If she failed to do said tasks, she would be punished . She later wrote that she knew that Catholics believed that suicide was a grave sin and it was for this reason that she endured her father's harsh treatment.

Her education changed in 1652 when the Holland family moved to Bruges and her father went back to England. During this time she attended Catholic masses in secret.

By 1660, the Hollands had returned to England and Sir John began serving on the new Council of State, in order to bring about the restoration of the monarchy. To the displeasure of her father, Holland's attraction to Catholicism became stronger during this time and she began corresponding in secret with Mary Bedingfield, the prioress at the English Augustinian convent in Bruges, in 1661. Bedingfield offered Holland help to leave England and, in 1662, she wrote a letter each to her mother and father, left them on a table in her room and crept out of their home in London in the early morning. She then met an accomplice at a pre arranged place and they travelled to Dover together. Because what she was doing was illegal she gave a false name to the border officials.

Mary Bedingfield was prioress at the English Augustinian convent in Bruges in 1661 and it was she who offered to assist Holland in leaving England. She sent someone to accompany her from England to the convent.

Holland's journey was successful and she became a choir nun on 3 September 1664 in Bruges at the English convent of Nazareth. Less than two weeks later she completed her auto-biography,"'How I came to change my religion", which she dedicated to her fellow nuns and marked her conversion to Roman Catholicism from Anglicanism. Holland's time at the convent was spent writing. She was said to have translated several books and lives of saints from French and Dutch into English.

== Death and legacy ==
Holland died in Bruges in 1720. Over two hundred years later a fellow Nazareth nun, Catherine Sidney Durrant, published How I came to change my religion within her book Link Between Flemish Mystics and English Martyrs.
