= Holland baronets =

Set index for Holland baronets

There have been four baronetcies created for persons with the surname Holland, one in the Baronetage of England and three in the Baronetage of the United Kingdom.

- Holland baronets of Quiddenham (1629)
- Holland, later Holland-Hibbert baronets of Sandebridge (1853): see Viscount Knutsford
- Holland baronets of Broughton (1907): see Baron Rotherham
- Holland baronets of Westwell Manor (1917)

== See also ==
- Sir Nathaniel Dance-Holland, 1st Baronet
