= Clement Paston =

English sea-captain

- Member of Parliament for Norfolk
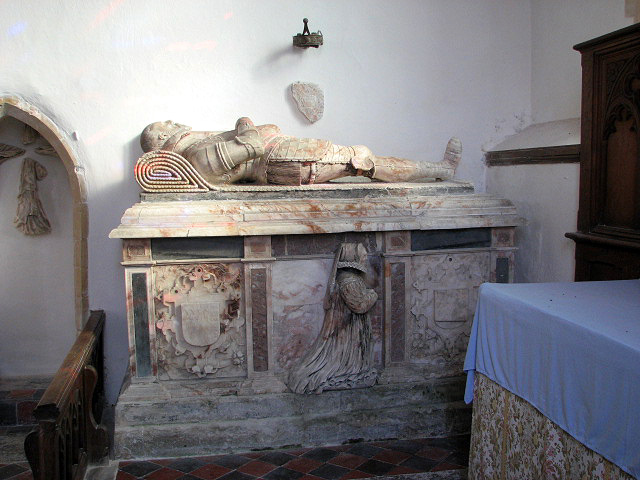
- Chest tomb and recumbent effigy of Sir Clement Paston in St Michael's Church, Oxnead, Norfolk
- Born: c. 1515–23
- Died: 1597 (aged about 80)
- Buried: St Michael's Church, Oxnead
- Spouse: Alice Packington

Clement Paston (c. 1515–23 – 1597) of Oxnead Hall in Norfolk, was an English sea-captain and served as a Member of Parliament for Norfolk in 1563. Three of his brothers also served as Members of Parliament. Having married a wealthy widow he rebuilt Oxnead Hall, inherited from his father.

== Origins ==
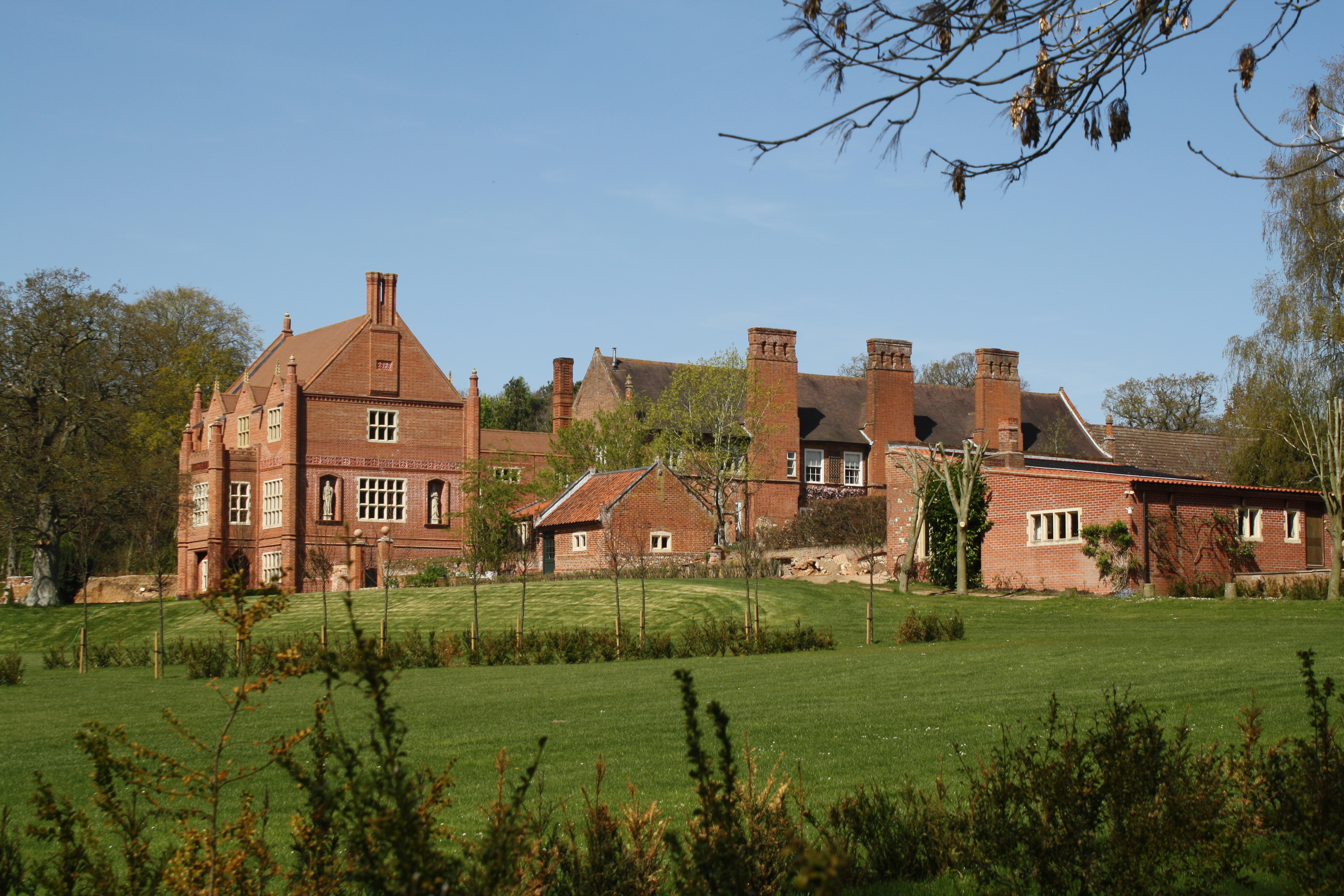
Oxnead Hall, rebuilt by Clement Paston, now with major 19th century additions

He was the fifth but fourth surviving son of Sir William Paston (c. 1479 – 1554) of Caister and Oxnead, by his wife Bridget Heydon, a daughter of Sir Henry Heydon of Baconsthorpe, Norfolk, MP. His brothers included Erasmus Paston, MP, John Paston, MP, and Sir Thomas Paston, MP. The Paston family originated at the manor of Paston in Norfolk. Clement Paston is said by Lloyd (1665) to have served the King of France in the time of King Henry VII (1485-1509), but the inscription on his monument, which gives the date of his death as 1597, says: "Twice forty years he lived and somewhat more", fixing the date of his birth at about 1515.

== Career ==
Arms of Paston of Paston, Norfolk: Argent, six fleurs-de-lys azure a chief indented or

He is first mentioned in 1544 as "one of the pensioners" and a fitting man to command a king's ship. In 1545 he commanded the Pelican of Danzig, of three hundred tons, in the fleet under John Dudley, Viscount Lisle. In 1546, still, presumably, in the Pelican, he captured a French galley, having on board the Baron St. Blanchard, who appears to have been coming to England on some informal embassy from the King of France. The galley was probably the Mermaid, which was added to the English navy, but no documents describing the capture survive. It was afterwards debated whether the galley was "good prize", and whether St. Blanchard ought to pay ransom, for which Paston demanded five thousand crowns, with two thousand more for maintenance. At the request of the king, on giving his bond for the money, the baron was released, and he returned to France with his servants, "two horses, and twelve mastiff dogs". Afterwards he pleaded that he was under compulsion at the time, and that the bond was worthless, nor does it appear that the money was paid. Paston, however, kept the plunder of the galley, of which a gold cup, with two snakes forming the handles, was in 1829 still in the possession of his descendants. Lloyd's statement that Paston captured the Admiral of France and received thirty thousand crowns for his ransom is as incorrect as that "he was the first that made the English navy terrible". At the Battle of Pinkie in 1547, Paston was wounded and left for dead. It is said that he was the captor of Thomas Wyatt in 1554, which is contrary to evidence, and that he commanded the fleet at Havre in 1562, which is fiction. In 1570 he was a magistrate of Norfolk, and a commissioner for the trial and execution of traitors, and in 1587, though a deputy-lieutenant of the county, he was suspected of being lukewarm in the interests of religion. In 1588 he was Sheriff of Norfolk. He died on 18 February 1597, and was buried in the church of Oxnead, where a "stately marble tomb" testifies that

Princes he served four,
In peace and war,
As fortune did command,
Sometimes by sea
And sometimes on the shore.

== Marriage ==
At some time after 1567 he married Alice Packington, a daughter of Humphrey Pakington of London and the widow of Richard Lambert of London, but appears to have had no children. He left the bulk of his property to his wife, with remainder to his nephew Sir William Paston.

== Sources ==
- Blomefield and Parkins's History of Norfolk, vi. 487;
- Chambers's History of Norfolk, p. 211, 959;
- The account in Lloyd's State Worthies is untrustworthy;
- State Papers of Henry VIII (1830, &c.), i. 811, 866, 894, xi. 329;
- Acts of the Privy Council (Dasent), 1542–7 pp. 514, 566, 1547–50 p. 447;
- State Papers of Henry VIII (in the Public Record Office), vols. xvi–xix.

== Bibliography ==
- Archbold, William Arthur Jobson (1895). "Paston, William (1479?-1554)" . In Lee, Sidney (ed.). Dictionary of National Biography. Vol. 44. London: Smith, Elder & Co. pp. 7–8.
- Laughton, John Knox (1895). "Paston, Clement" . In Lee, Sidney (ed.). Dictionary of National Biography. Vol. 44. London: Smith, Elder & Co. pp. 1–2.
- Mimardière, A. M. "Paston (1981). "Clement (by 1523-98), of Oxnead, Norfolk". In Hassler, P. W. The History of Parliament: the House of Commons 1558-1603. London: Boydell & Brewer. n.p.
