= Paston Great Barn =

Medieval barn in Norfolk, England

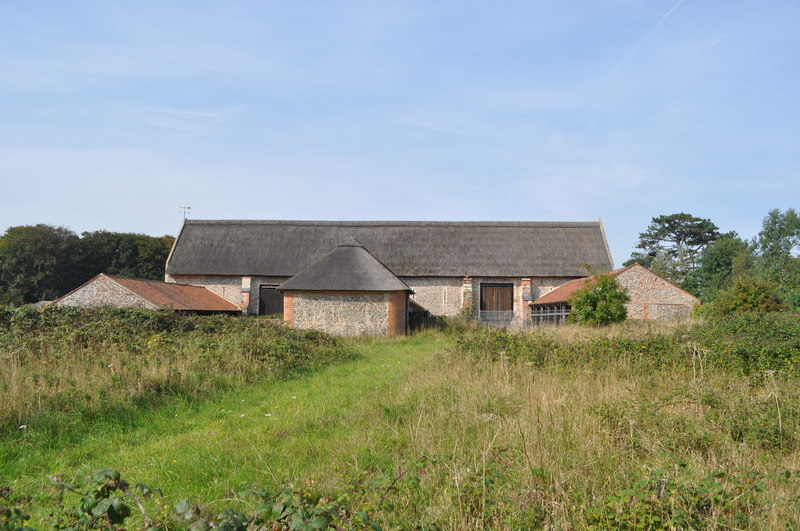
- The Barn in 2010

- Location within Norfolk
- 52°51′25″N 1°26′51″E
- Type: Barn
- Location: Paston
- OS grid reference: TG 32192 34539

History
- Built: 1581

Site notes
- Area: Norfolk
- Governing body: Natural England
- Owner: North Norfolk Historic Buildings Trust

Listed Building – Grade II*
- Official name: Paston Great Barn
- Designated: 16 April 1955
- Reference no.: 1306240

Scheduled monument
- Official name: Great Barn, Paston
- Reference no.: 1002884

Paston Great Barn is a medieval barn near Paston Hall on the southeast edge of the village of Paston in northeast Norfolk, owned by the North Norfolk Historic Buildings Trust. Dating from 1581, the building has a long association with the Paston family. A scheduled monument and a grade II* listed building, the barn is the centre of a 0.95 hectares (2.3 acres) biological Site of Special Scientific Interest, a National Nature Reserve and a Special Area of Conservation. It is in the Norfolk Coast Area of Outstanding Natural Beauty.

== The barn ==
The barn is a long, low building, with a thatched roof, and walls built of brick, flint and limestone, with large doors with timber lintels. The barn was commissioned by Sir William Paston III as a grain store and threshing barn. It is approximately 70 metres (230 ft) long, 9 metres (30 ft) wide and 16 metres (52 ft) high. It has been granted Grade II* listed building status by English Heritage due to its architectural and historical importance. There are three 30 metres (98 ft) long Victorian wings on the eastern side of the barn, added to house cattle. Unusually for a barn it has two date stones, one over an entrance and one in a gable end. Additionally, a plaque over the south door records: "THE BILDING OF THIS BEARNE IS Bl SIR W PASTON KNIGHTE".

The barn and its immediate surroundings was notified as a biological Site of Special Scientific Interest by English Nature in 1999, and from April 2005, the site has also been designated as a Special Area of Conservation.

In 2002, English Nature took on a 50-year lease of the barn. There is currently no public access into the barn, partly in order to minimise disturbance to the bats, although some educational interpretation at the site is being considered for the future.

== Bats ==
The barn is one of only six known maternity roosts in Britain for the barbastelle bat, a species which is rare at a European scale, and it is the only roost in a building. The colony was discovered in 1996. The barbastelles mostly roost in large crevices in timber lintels over the barn doors. Their feeding grounds are believed to include nearby coastal cliffs.

Breeding colonies of Natterer's bat (Myotis nattereri), brown long-eared bat (Plecotus auritus) and common pipistrelle (Pipistrellus pipistrellus) also inhabit the barn.
