= Elizabeth Killigrew, Viscountess Shannon =

English courtier (1622–1680)

Elizabeth Boyle, Viscountess Shannon (born Elizabeth Killigrew; baptised 16 May 1622 – December 1680), was an English courtier and mistress of King Charles II.

== Life ==
Elizabeth Killigrew was a daughter of Sir Robert Killigrew and Mary Woodhouse, and sister of dramatist Thomas Killigrew. She was baptised at St Margaret Lothbury, London, on 16 May 1622.

On 24 October 1639, she married Francis Boyle (later Viscount Shannon), son of the Irish landowner Richard Boyle, 1st Earl of Cork. He was a friend of her stepfather, Thomas Stafford (MP). As the couple was young, there was discussion whether they should live together, or if Francis should depart on a Grand Tour first.

Elizabeth joined the royalist court-in-exile of Queen Henrietta Maria as a maid of honour – where she became one of the many mistresses of the queen's son, the future King Charles II. Her daughter Charlotte Jemima Henrietta Maria FitzRoy was fathered by the exiled Prince Charles in 1650.

In 1660, the year Charles was restored to the throne as Charles II, Elizabeth Killigrew's husband was raised to the Irish peerage as Viscount Shannon. Her daughter Charlotte married firstly the playwright James Howard and in 1672 remarried William Paston, son of the Earl of Yarmouth. Charlotte died in 1684.

Poet Anne Killigrew was Elizabeth's niece; among her relatives Lady Shannon also numbered the politicians and playwrights Sir William Killigrew (her brother) and Roger Boyle, Earl of Orrery (a brother-in-law), Robert Boyle, the physicist, and Katherine Jones, Viscountess Ranelagh (the latter two siblings-in-law).
