= James Howard (dramatist) =

James Howard (c. 1640 – July 1669) was an English dramatist and member of a Royalist family during the English Civil War and the Restoration.

He was the second son of Thomas Howard (1621-1689) and his wife, Walburga or Werburge van der Kerchove. His father Thomas was the second son of Theophilus Howard, 2nd Earl of Suffolk, and the younger brother of James Howard, 3rd Earl of Suffolk.

Howard married Charlotte Fitzroy, a daughter of the Stuart King Charles II and Elizabeth Killigrew. Their daughter was named Stuarta Werburge Howard after Howard's mother and after his wife.

== Works ==
Howard wrote two comedies, All Mistaken, or the Mad Couple, (c.1667), and The English Mounsieur (1666). Both starred Nell Gwynn, the mistress of Charles II.

Three of Howard's brothers also wrote plays: Edward Howard, Colonel Henry Howard, and Robert Howard. A sister, Elizabeth Howard, married the poet John Dryden.
