= Francis Boyle, 1st Viscount Shannon =

Irish noble and official, English Army officer

Francis Boyle, 1st Viscount Shannon (1623–1699) was a Privy Counsellor of Ireland and held the office of Governor of County Cork.

He was the sixth son of Richard Boyle, 1st Earl of Cork by his second wife, Catherine Fenton. Upon his father's death in 1643, he inherited Annery House near Bideford, Devon, as well as the manor of Salcombe and Halberton Manor. For his military services in support of King Charles II he was created Viscount Shannon in 1660. In 1672 he was appointed Governor of the City and County of Cork.

On 24 October 1638 at the King's Chapel, Whitehall, he married Elizabeth Killigrew, sister of the dramatist Thomas Killigrew, daughter of Sir Robert Killigrew and Mary Woodhouse. They had two sons and a daughter Elizabeth, who married John Jephson. Subsequently, Elizabeth Killigrew had a daughter by Charles II, Charlotte Jemima FitzRoy (c.1650–1684). Elizabeth died in 1681.

The Viscount died in 1699 and was buried 19 April 1699 at St Mary's Collegiate Church, Youghal, Cork. He was succeeded by Richard Boyle, 2nd Viscount Shannon, the eldest son of his eldest son, his eldest son having predeceased him.

Peerage of Ireland
New creation	Viscount Shannon; 1660–1699	Succeeded by Richard Boyle
