= John Spelman (MP for Castle Rising) =

John Spelman (12 September 1606 – 31 January 1663) was an English politician who sat in the House of Commons from 1645 to 1648 and in 1660.

== Biography ==
Spelman was the son of Sir Clement Spelman of Narborough, Norfolk and his wife Ursula Willoughby, daughter of Sir John Willoughby of Risley.

In 1645, Spelman was elected Member of Parliament for Castle Rising in the Long Parliament. He was excluded in 1648 under Pride's Purge.

In 1660, Spelman was elected MP for Castle Rising in the Convention Parliament.

Spelman died at the age of 56.

Spelman married Anne Heveningham, daughter of Sir John Heveningham.

Parliament of England
Preceded by Sir John Holland, 1st Baronet; Robert Hatton	Member of Parliament for Castle Rising; 1645–1648; With: Sir John Holland, 1st Baronet	Succeeded by Not represented in Rump Parliament
