= Buckworth-Herne-Soame baronets =

Title in the Baronetage of England

- Escutcheon of the Buckworth-Herne-Soame baronets of Sheen
- Creation date: 1697
- Status: dormant

The Buckworth, later Buckworth-Herne, later Buckworth-Herne-Soame Baronetcy, of Sheen in the County of Surrey, is a title in the Baronetage of England. It was created on 1 April 1697 for John Buckworth, High Sheriff of London in 1704. The second Baronet sat as Member of Parliament for Weobley. The third Baronet was Assistant Gentleman Usher to George II. The fifth Baronet was Gentleman-Pensioner and Exon of the Guard during the reign of George III. He married Anne, daughter of Paston Herne, of Haveringland Hall, Norfolk, and assumed by Royal licence the additional surname of Herne. The sixth Baronet assumed in 1806 by Royal licence the additional surname of Soame in compliance with the will of Sir Peter Soame, 4th Baronet, of Thurlow (see Soame baronets). The ninth Baronet was a member of the Shropshire County Council.

== Buckworth, later Buckworth-Herne, later Buckworth-Herne-Soame baronets, of Sheen (1697) ==
- Sir John Buckworth, 1st Baronet (1662–1709)
- Sir John Buckworth, 2nd Baronet (1704–1759)
- Sir Everard Buckworth, 3rd Baronet (1704–1779)
- Sir John Buckworth, 4th Baronet (1726–1801)
- Sir Everard Buckworth-Herne, 5th Baronet (1732–1814)
- Sir Buckworth Buckworth-Herne-Soame, 6th Baronet (1762–1822)
- Sir Peter Buckworth-Herne-Soame, 7th Baronet (1793–1860)
- Sir John Buckworth-Herne-Soame, 8th Baronet (1794–1888)
  - Charles Buckworth-Herne-Soame (1798–1863)
- Sir Charles Buckworth-Herne-Soame, 9th Baronet (1830–1906)
  - Richard Everard Buckworth-Herne-Soame Tamworth (1863–1884)
- Sir Charles Buckworth-Herne-Soame, 10th Baronet (1864–1931)
  - Lieutenant Richard Everard Buckworth-Herne-Soame (1891–1916)
- Sir Charles Burnett Buckworth-Herne-Soame, 11th Baronet (1894–1977)
- Sir Charles John Buckworth-Herne-Soame, 12th Baronet (1932–2013)
- Sir Richard John Buckworth-Herne-Soame, 13th Baronet (born 1970). Not on the Official Roll, and without heir, according to Who's Who.
