= Holland baronets of Westwell Manor (1917) =

The Holland baronetcy, of Westwell Manor in the County of Oxford, was created in the Baronetage of the United Kingdom on 17 February 1917 for Sothern Holland. He was Trade Commissioner to South Africa from 1908 to 1914 and Director-General of Inspection of Munitions in 1916. The title became extinct on the death of the 3rd Baronet in 1997.

== Holland baronets, of Westwell Manor (1917) ==
- Sir (Alfred Reginald) Sothern Holland, 1st Baronet (1876–1948)
- Sir Jim Sothern Holland, 2nd Baronet (1911–1981)
- Sir Guy Hope Holland, 3rd Baronet (1918–1997)

Coat of arms of the Holland baronets of Westwell Manor
Crest A fox sejant Gules collared Argent supporting with the dexter fore-paw an anchor Or. Escutcheon Azure a lion rampant guardant within an orle surrounded by four mullets and as many fleurs-de-lys alternately all Argent. Motto Faire Devoir En Bonne Esperance
