= Charles Buckworth-Herne-Soame =

Baronet in the Baronetage of England

Sir Charles Buckworth-Herne-Soame, 9th Baronet (1830–1906) was a baronet in the Baronetage of England, the ninth of the Buckworth-Herne-Soame baronets of Sheen in the County of Surrey.

== Biography ==
Born on 29 May 1830, Sir Charles Buckworth-Herne-Soame, 9th Baronet was educated at Bedford School and at the Medical College of St Bartholomew's Hospital. He was the ninth of the Buckworth-Herne-Soame baronets of Sheen in the County of Surrey, created on 1 April 1697 for Sir John Buckworth, 1st Baronet (1662–1709), High Sheriff of London in 1704. He succeeded to the title upon the death of his uncle, Sir John Buckworth-Herne-Soame, 8th Baronet, on 1 February 1888, and was a Member of the Royal College of Surgeons of Edinburgh (MRCSE).

Sir Charles Buckworth-Herne-Soame, 9th Baronet died in Dawley, Shropshire, on 25 March 1906, aged 75, and was succeeded by his son Sir Charles Buckworth-Herne-Soame, 10th Baronet (1864–1931).

Baronetage of England
Preceded by John Buckworth-Herne-Soame	Baronet (of Sheen); 1888 – 1906	Succeeded by Charles Buckworth-Herne-Soame
