= Paston College =

Location
- North Walsham, Norfolk, NR28 9JL; United Kingdom
- Coordinates: 52.8204°N 1.3861°E

Information
- Type: Sixth form college
- Motto: French: De mieux en mieux pour tout; "Better to better everywhere"
- Established: 1606; 420 years ago
- Founder: Sir William Paston
- Principal: Corrienne Peasgood
- Gender: Coeducational
- Age: 16 to 19+
- Colours: Burgundy and grey
- Former pupils: Old Pastonians
- Website: www.paston.ac.uk

Paston College (previously Paston Sixth Form College) is a sixth form college located in the town of North Walsham, Norfolk. The college has been part of City College Norwich, following a merger of the two colleges, since 1 December 2017.

== History ==
Sir William Paston's Free School (known as Paston School) was founded on the present site in 1606 by local magistrate and landowner Sir William Paston. An all-boys day and boarding grammar school, it sent many of its pupils to Gonville College, Cambridge. In 1610, Sir William Paston died, and a Trust created by his will continued to keep the school in operation. The Paston Trustees continue to own two of the college's three sites. In 1766, a new school building on the Grammar School Road was completed. Until 1984, Paston School had four houses, Tenison (Red), Wharton (Blue), Hoste (White) and Nelson (Yellow). In 1919, North Walsham High School for Girls, a girls grammar school, was opened by the Misses Cooke (known locally as "Cookies") to complement the work of Paston. The expansion of local railways led more pupils travelling daily to Paston by railway (known as "train boys"), and by 1946 more than 270 boys were day pupils. Students continued to board until the mid-1950s.

The 20th century brought radical changes to education in Britain, with the 1902 and 1944 Education Acts. In 1908, Paston School became a county secondary school under the new Norfolk County Council Local Education Authority. In 1953, Paston School became a voluntary aided grammar school and later a voluntary controlled grammar school. Paston Sixth Form College was formed in 1984 when grammar schools, Paston School and North Walsham High School for Girls merged. In 1993, the college was incorporated as an Independent College of Further Education under the 1991 Further and Higher Education Act. In 2017, Paston Sixth Form College merged with City College Norwich and changed its name to Paston College. The college occupies the buildings of its 2 predecessor schools. The two sites include buildings dating from the 18th, 19th and 20th centuries, set in extensive lawns in the centre of the town.

== Curriculum ==
Paston College offers A-Levels, GCSEs, Level 2 Programme and the Level 3 BTEC Extended Diploma. A-Level courses include; Art, Biology, Business, Chemistry, Drama and Theatre Studies, English Language, English Literature, Environmental Science, Film Studies, French, Further Mathematics, Geography, Graphic Communication, History, Law, Maths, Media Studies, Philosophy and Religion, Photography, Physics, Politics, Psychology, Sociology and Textiles.

== Exam results ==
In 2017, Paston College's A Level results were 53% A*-B, 80% A*-C, 99% A*-E. At BTEC, students achieved 100% pass rates, with 63% achieving top grades. The majority of students go on to university, including Oxford, Cambridge and other Russel Groups.

GCE Results	2012	2013	2014	2015	2016	2017
A*-B (%)	52	57	/	50	50	53
A*-C (%)	75	74	/	75	78	80
A*-E (%)	98	94	/	96	98	99

== Headmasters ==
- 1604-25: Michael Tylles, MA(Cantab)[Corpus]
- 1625-40: Thomas Acres, MA(Cantab)[Trinity]
- 1640-48: Edward Warnes, MA(Cantab)[Corpus]
- 1648-66: Henry Luce, MA(Cantab)[Queens']
- 1667-76: Joseph Eldred, BA(Cantab)[Trinity]
- 1676-01: Robert Harvey, MA(Cantab)[Emmanuel]
- 1701-03: Nicholas Girling, BA(Cantab)[Christ's]
- 1703-21: John Montford, MA(Cantab)[Trinity Hall]
- 1721-47: John Gallant, BA(Cantab)[Corpus]
- 1747-64: Alexander Campbell, MA(Aberdeen)

[1764-67: school closed for rebuilding]

- 1767-78: John Price Jones, MA(Oxon)[Jesus]
- 1778-95: Joseph Hepworth, MA(Cantab)[Queens’]
- 1796-07: Henry Hunter, BA(Cantab)[Queen's]
- 1807-25: William Tylney Spurdens, BA(Oxon)[St Edmund Hall]
- 1825-35: William Rees, BA(Oxon)[Jesus]
- 1835-43: Samuel Rees, MA(Cantab)[St John's]
- 1843: George Harrison Wharton Thompson, MA(Oxon)[Magdalen Hall]
- 1844-73: Thomas Dry, MA(Oxon) [Merton Hall]
- 1874-78: Frederick Richard Pentreath, MA, DD(Oxon)[Worcester]
- 1878-04: Henry Whytehead Wimble, MA(Oxon)[Queen's]
- 1904-22: George Hare [no degree; first non-ordained Master]
- 1922-46: Major Percival Pickford, MA(Oxon)[Lincoln]
- 1946-75: Lt Colonel Kenneth Newton Marshall, MA(Cantab)[Magdalene]
- 1975-81: Kenneth Michael Harre, MA(Oxon)[Exeter](Rev)
- 1981-90: Peter Brice
- 1990-96: Molly Whitworth
- 1996-2012: Peter Mayne, MA(Oxon)[St Edmund Hall], MA(Leic)
- 2012-17: Kevin Grieve
- 2017-22: Corrienne Peasgood [no degree]
- 2022-26: Jerry White
- 2026-present: Tom Smith

== Coat of arms ==
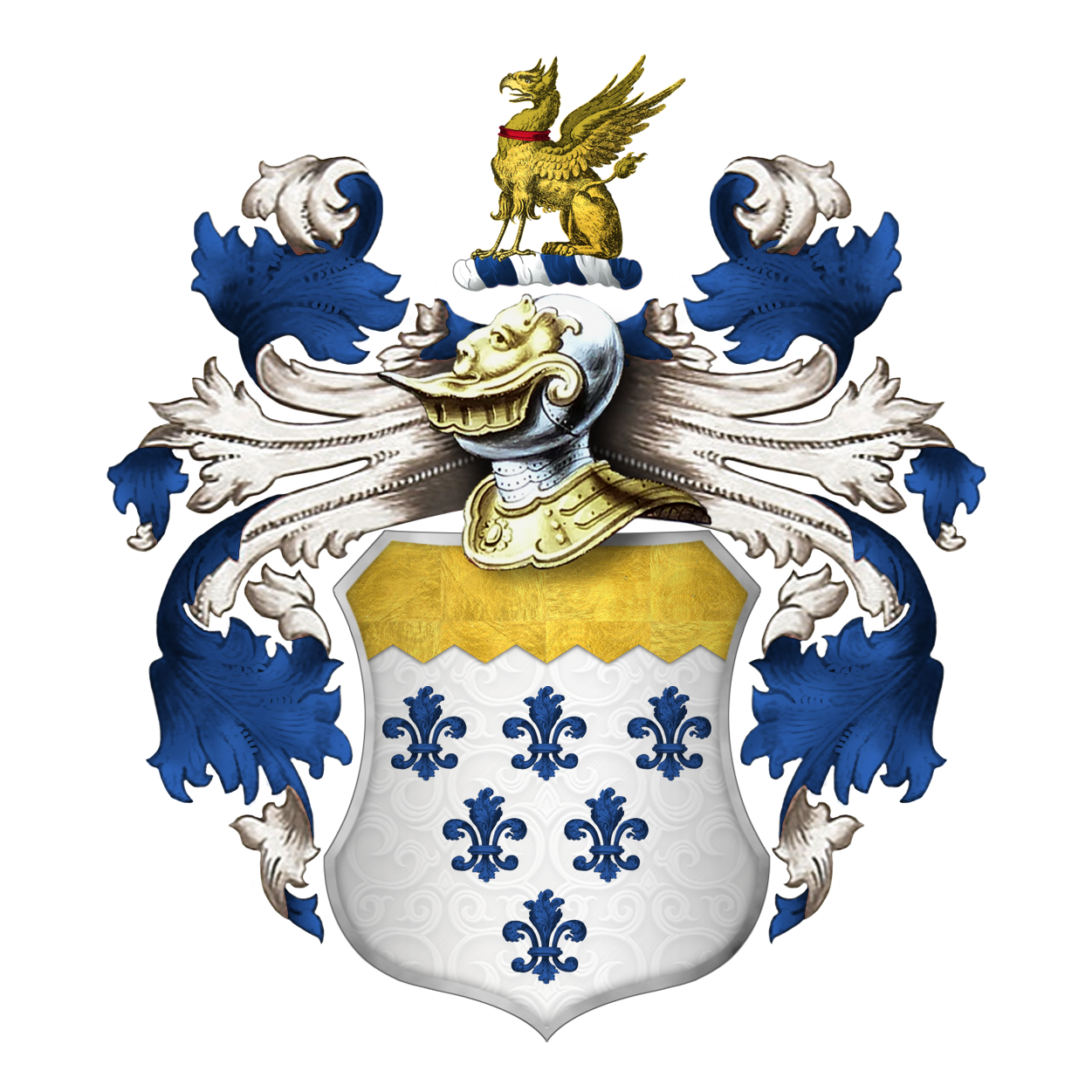
Coat of Arms Sir WIlliam Paston

Since 1606, the college's coat of arms has been that of the Paston Family, containing a griffin crest and six fleur-de-lys. The college's motto De mieux en mieux en pour tout ("From good to better everywhere") also belongs to William Paston and is associated with these coat of arms.

== Old Pastonians ==
- Sam Kelly, Britain's Got Talent contestant and musician
- Colonel James Woodham, Royal Anglian Regiment, awarded the Military Cross in peacetime in 2006 for gallantry
- Charlie Hall, Chief Constable, Hertfordshire Constabulary
- Alex Windsor, All Elite Wrestling Professional Wrestler

=== Paston School ===
- Dr. James H. Keeler, Head of the Yusuf Hamied Department of Chemistry, University of Cambridge, 2018-
- Clive Baker, former professional goalkeeper
- Prof David Chiddick, Vice Chancellor from 2000 to 2009 of the University of Lincoln
- Tony Colman, Labour MP from 1997 to 2005 for Putney
- Prof Henry Forder, mathematician, known for the Forder Lectureship
- Stephen Fry, British actor
- Edwin Le Grice, priest, Dean of Ripon from 1968 to 1984
- Prof Rod Morgan
- Craig Murray, Ambassador to Uzbekistan from 2002 to 2004
- Robin Nash, Head of Variety and later Head of Comedy at the BBC
- Horatio Nelson, 1st Viscount Nelson
- William Nelson, 1st Earl Nelson
- Flight Sergeant Charles Roberts (January 19, 1921 - 17 May 1943, from Northrepps), who flew on the Dambusters Raid as a navigator in Lancaster AJ-A with pilot Squadron Leader Dinghy Young in the second section of the first wave; his aircraft was the fourth to bomb the Möhne Dam, but was hit by flak at 02.58 when returning, near the Dutch coast at Castricum aan Zee; he is buried at Bergen General Cemetery
- Allan Smethurst, The Singing Postman
- Rev Norman Snaith
- Thomas Tenison, Archbishop of Canterbury
- Andrew Ian Cooper, British Chemist
- Mal Peet, Writer, illustrator - Writes about his experience at the school in his semi-biography, Life: An Exploded Diagram (2011)

=== North Walsham High School for Girls ===
- Gillian Shephard, Baroness Shepherd of Northwold, Conservative MP from 1987 to 2005 for South West Norfolk
- Carole Walker, BBC political correspondent
