= Robert Steward (MP) =

English politician

Sir Robert Steward (1617–1672), of Lincoln's Inn and King's Lynn, Norfolk, was an English politician.

He was the 3rd son of Thomas Steward of Barton Mills, Suffolk and educated at Mildenhall Grammar School, Bury St Edmunds Grammar School, Sidney Sussex College, Cambridge (1633) and Lincoln's Inn (1641) where he was called to the bar in 1651. He was the Recorder for King's Lynn from 1660 to his death.

He was a Member (MP) of the Parliament of England for Thetford in 1659 and for Castle Rising from 1661 to June 1672. He was knighted on 10 July 1670.

He was married with 2 daughters.
