= Oxnead =

Former civil parish in Norfolk, England

Coordinates: 52.768°N 1.304°E

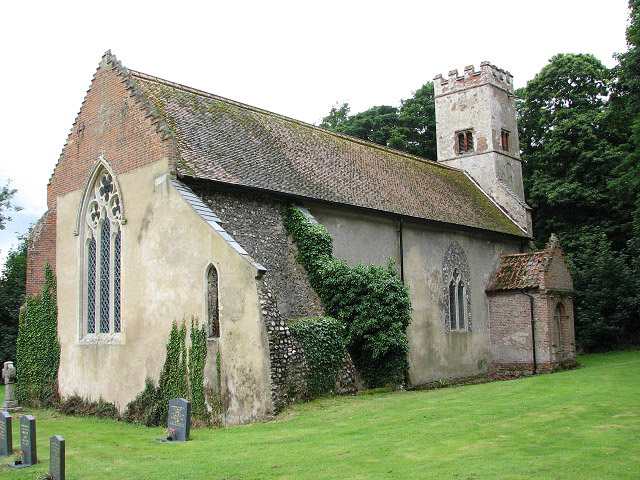
- St Michael's Church, Oxnead

- Location within Norfolk
- Civil parish: Brampton
- District: Broadland
- Shire county: Norfolk
- Region: East
- Country: England
- Sovereign state: United Kingdom

Oxnead is a lost settlement and former civil parish, now in the parish of Brampton, in the Broadland district, in the county of Norfolk, England. It is roughly three miles south-east of Aylsham. It now consists mostly of St Michael's Church and Oxnead Hall. The hall was the principal residence of the Paston family from 1597 until the death of William Paston, 2nd Earl of Yarmouth in 1732. Under Sir William Paston (1610–1663), Oxnead was the site of several works by the architect and sculptor, Nicholas Stone, master-mason to Kings James I and Charles I. In 1931 the parish had a population of 66.

== History ==
=== Early history ===
According to Blomefield, the place takes its name from its site on meadows beside a river known to the Britons and Saxons as the Ouse. At the time of the Domesday survey in 1086, the estate belonged to Halden and altogether was worth 30 shillings. It was seven furlongs long and six broad and included a church with twenty-four acres of glebe land. At the time of King Stephen, Oxnead belonged to Albert Greslei, from whom it passed to the Hauteyn family. Around 1368, the estate was acquired by Sir Robert de Salle. After Sir Robert's death, his widow's second husband, Sir William Clopton, took control of Oxnead and in the 1420s it was sold to William Paston, of Paston.

On 1 April 1935 the parish was abolished and merged with Brampton.

=== Paston family ===
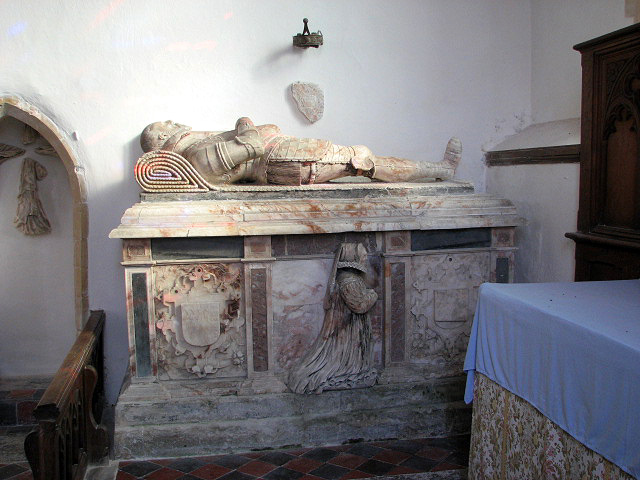
Tomb of Sir Clement Paston at Oxnead

William Paston, lawyer and later a judge, settled the Oxnead estate on his wife, Agnes, as part of their marriage agreement. The estate continued to pass down the family. In 1554 Sir William Paston, an eminent lawyer and courtier who had been present at the Field of the Cloth of Gold, bequeathed it to his fourth son, Clement Paston (1515–1597).

Sir Clement Paston (1515–1597) built the Oxnead Hall of which one wing remains today. Blomefield notes that Clement was born at Paston Hall on 'the sea coast, and having a genius and love for shipping and navigation, was in his youth admitted to the service of King Henry VIII in the navy, and made captain of one of the King's ships', and in an engagement with the French [in May, 1546, in command of the Anne Gallant, according to the Oxford Dictionary of National Biography took their admiral called the Baron de St. Blankheare, or Blankard, whom he kept a prisoner at Castor by Yarmouth till he paid 7000 crowns, for his ransom, besides considerable things of value, which were found in his ship'. Blomefield also notes of Clement that 'King Henry VIII called him his Champion; the Duke of Somerset, Protector in King Edward's reign, called him his Souldier; Queen Mary, her Seaman; and Queen Elizabeth, her Father'.

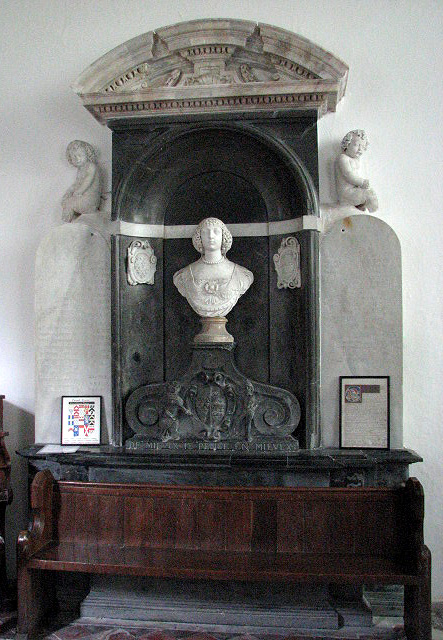
Tomb of Lady Katherine Paston at Oxnead

Some time after 1567, Clement married Alice, the daughter of Humphrey Packington and widow of Richard Lambert, both of London. Alice was wealthy and Clement was able to rebuild Oxnead with her money.

In his will, Clement desired "his body to be laid in the earth in the chauncel of the parish church of Oxned, his funeral not to be costly, nor over sumptuous, but decent and christian-like, according to his degree and calling; a fair and convenient tomb to be made over his body, and his and his wife's arms to be graven thereon".

Clement left Oxnead to his nephew, Sir William Paston (1528–1610). This William was the founder of the Paston Grammar School in North Walsham. He made Oxnead his principal home but is buried in North Walsham church. His second son, Sir Edmund Paston (1585–1632) inherited the family estates and is buried in Paston church.

Sir William Paston (1610–1663) succeeded Sir Edmund. He studied at Corpus Christi College, Cambridge, graduating as a Bachelor of Arts in 1626. R. W. Ketton-Cremer comments that in 1632, William inherited what may well have been the richest estate in Norfolk. In 1636, he became High Sheriff of Norfolk, and on 8 June 1642, was created a baronet. His first wife was Lady Katherine Bertie, daughter of the Robert Bertie, 1st Earl of Lindsey. Lady Katherine died in childbirth in 1636 after seven years of marriage and was buried in the chancel of Oxnead church. Ketton-Cremer describes Sir William as a lover of art and poetry and patron of writers and painters. Among this patronage was Paston's commissioning of Nicholas Stone to carve memorials to his parents in Paston Church, busts for his house at Oxnead and statuary for his gardens. Sir William died in 1663 and is buried at Paston.

Sir William's son, Sir Robert (1631–1683) became Baron Paston and Viscount Yarmouth in 1673 and 1st Earl of Yarmouth in 1679. According to the Oxford Dictionary of National Biography, Robert like his father was an avid collector of 'books, paintings, jewellery and curios'. He also continued to develop Oxnead Hall and built a banqueting hall for the visit of King Charles II in 1671. However, his extravagance caused increasing financial difficulties and he had to mortgage or sell large parts of his estates. He died in 1683 and is buried at Oxnead.

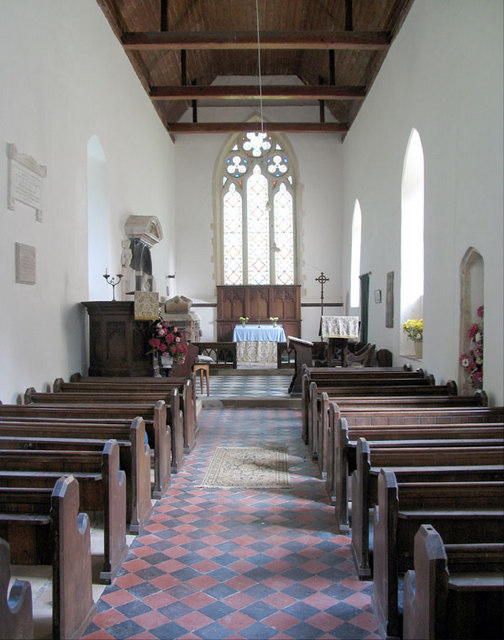
Interior of St Michael's Church, Oxnead

In turn, the 1st Earl's son, William (1653/4-1732), inherited the title and estates, and married a natural daughter of King Charles II, Lady Charlotte Fitzroy, but continued to run heavily into debt. He was also the last of the male line and with him the titles became extinct. Blomefield comments that 'after the death of this Earl, who left his estates to pay his debts, this agreeable seat, with the park, gardens, &c. soon run into decay, the greatest part of the house was pulled down, the materials sold, only a part of it left for a farmer to inhabit, and was sold to the Right Honourable Lord Anson.’

== St Michael’s Church ==
The church is mostly thirteenth-century and built of flint with stone dressings. However, there are several later additions in brick, dating from the sixteenth to eighteenth centuries, such as the top of the tower, two porches and a stepped east gable.

Inside, there is a monument to Sir Clement Paston (1515–1597). This is a tomb-chest featuring his recumbent effigy and a kneeing figure of his wife, Lady Alice. There is also a monument to Lady Katherine Paston, wife of Sir William (1610–1663), who died in childbirth in 1637. This work is by the celebrated Jacobean sculptor Nicholas Stone. The church also includes a seventeenth-century font.

== Oxnead Hall ==
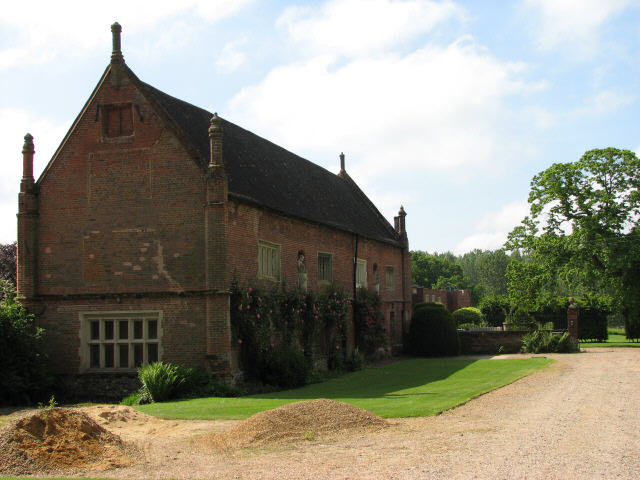
The remaining part of the original Oxnead Hall

The house was originally built for Sir Clement around 1580, but was remodelled by Nicholas Stone, for Sir William Paston, between 1631 and 1632. At its zenith the house had seventy-nine rooms, but under the Earls of Yarmouth it declined until by 1744 it was described as ruinous.

A two-storey service wing, with mullioned and transomed windows, is all that remains of this Hall. Pevsner comments that the west front 'displays a nice pedimented doorway and a moulded platband between the floors.' A nineteenth-century extension has been added and the Hall is occupied. In the 1990s and 2000s, a neo-Elizabethan block was added to the south, on the site of part of the earlier hall; formal gardens have also been created in evocation of what might have existed around 1600.

Nothing remains of the garden statuary installed by Nicholas Stone, though his Hercules, originally from Oxnead, can be seen in the Orangery at Blickling Hall. Blickling, in its parterre, also has a sixteenth- or early seventeenth-century fountain, consisting of a basin on a base, bought from Oxnead in 1732.

On 21 August 2016 the gardens were opened to the public in aid of charity.

== Oxnead Mill ==
Across the River Bure is Oxnead watermill, a four-storey edifice dating from 1851. A mill stood in Oxnead at the time of the Domesday Book in 1086. From about 1716 to 1822 the site was occupied by a paper mill. The mill then made blankets until being rebuilt in 1851 as a flour mill. In 1940 the mill reverted to paper making.

== See also ==
- Paston Letters

== Bibliography ==
- Ketton-Cremer, R W (1969) Norfolk in the Civil War, London, Faber and Faber
- Pevsner, Nikolaus and Wilson, Bill (1997) "The Buildings of England: Norfolk 1: Norwich and the North-East", London, Penguin Books ISBN 0-14-071058-2
