= Viscount Shannon =

Title in the Peerage of Ireland

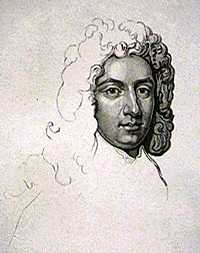
Richard Boyle, 2nd Viscount Shannon.

Viscount Shannon, in the County of Limerick, was a title in the Peerage of Ireland. It was created in 1660 for the Honourable Francis Boyle, sixth son of Richard Boyle, 1st Earl of Cork. He was succeeded by his grandson, the second Viscount. He was a Field Marshal in the Army and served as Commander-in-Chief of Ireland from 1727 to 1740. The title became extinct on his death in 1740.

== Viscounts Shannon (1660) ==
- Francis Boyle, 1st Viscount Shannon (1623–1699)
- Richard Boyle, 2nd Viscount Shannon (c. 1675–1740)

== See also ==
- Earl of Cork
- Earl of Shannon
