= Ashley (surname) =

Ashley is a surname. Notable people with the surname include:

- Alicia Ashley (born 1967), Jamaican-American boxer, former WBC world champion
- April Ashley (1935–2021), English model outed as a transgender woman
- Bernard Ashley (businessman) (1926–2009), British businessman and engineer, husband of Laura Ashley
- Bernard Ashley (author) (born 1935), British author of children's books
- Bob Ashley (1953–2024), American state senator
- Charles Ashley (disambiguation), several people
- Chester Ashley (1790–1848), American senator from Arkansas
- Clarence Ashley (1895–1967), American musician and singer
- Cyril and Claudia Ashley, fictional characters from Japanese light novel series Secrets of the Silent Witch
- Delos R. Ashley (1828–1873), American state senator
- Elizabeth Ashley, stage name of American actress Elizabeth Ann Cole (born 1971)
- Elizabeth Ashley (scientist), British physician and medical researcher
- Evelyn Ashley (1836–1907), British barrister and politician
- Francis Ashley (1569–1635), English lawyer and politician
- Francis Noel Ashley (1884–1976), British colonial administrator
- Frederic M. Ashley (1870–1960), American architect
- Henry Ashley (disambiguation), several people
- Jack Ashley, Baron Ashley of Stoke (1922–2012), British politician
- Jack Ashley (Australian footballer) (1890–1968), Australian rules footballer
- Jack Ashley (footballer, born 1912) (1912–1992), English footballer
- James Ashley (politician) (1940–2006), Lord Mayor of Manchester, England
- James Mitchell Ashley (1824–1896), American politician
- James Ashley (1958–1998), Englishman shot dead by Sussex Police – see Shooting of James Ashley
- John Ashley (disambiguation), several people
- Kat Ashley (c. 1502–1565), first close friend, governess and Lady of the Bedchamber to Queen Elizabeth I of England
- Laura Ashley (1925–1985), Welsh fashion designer and businesswoman
- Maurice Ashley (disambiguation), several people
- Michael Ashley (astronomer), Australian astronomer
- Mike Ashley (businessman) (born 1964), English billionaire owner of various sports-related shop chains
- Mike Ashley (writer) (born 1948), British researcher and editor of science fiction & dark fantasy
- Ossama Ashley (born 2000), English footballer
- Richard Ashley (musician) (1774–1836), English musician
- Richard Ashley (cricketer) (1902–1974), British cricketer
- Richard K. Ashley, American international relations scholar
- Robert Ashley (disambiguation), several people
- Simone Ashley, stage name of British actress Simone Ashwini Pillai (born 1995)
- Solomon Ashley (1690–1775), English politician
- Sylvia Ashley (1904–1977), English model, actress, and socialite born Edith Louisa Hawkes
- Thomas L. Ashley (1923–2010), American politician
- Tom Ashley (born 1984), New Zealand sailing champion
- Trisha Ashley, British author of romantic fiction
- William Ashley (disambiguation), several people

== See also ==
- Ashley (given name)
