= Astley (name) =

Astley is a surname and given name. Notable people with the name include:

== Surname ==
- Amy Astley (born 1969), American magazine editor
- Arthur Astley (1881–1915), British track and field athlete
- Delaval Astley (1868–1951), Scottish curler
- Dai Astley (1909–1989), Welsh footballer
- Edward Astley (disambiguation), multiple people, including:
  - Sir Edward Astley, 4th Baronet (1729–1802), British MP for Norfolk
  - Edward Astley, 22nd Baron Hastings (1912–2007), British peer, soldier and businessman
- Edwin Astley (1922–1998), British composer
- Gordon Astley, British radio presenter
- Graham Astley (born 1957), Australian cricketer
- Horace Astley (1882-?), English footballer
- Hubert Delaval Astley (1860–1925), painter
- Sir Isaac Astley (died 1659), English baronet
- Jack Astley (1909–1984), English football right back
- Jacob Astley (disambiguation), multiple people, including:
  - Jacob Astley, 1st Baron Astley of Reading (1579–1652), English soldier and royalist
  - Sir Jacob Astley, 1st Baronet (c. 1639 – 1729), English MP for Norfolk
  - Jacob Astley, 3rd Baron Astley of Reading (c. 1654 – 1688), English peer
  - Jacob Astley, 16th Baron Hastings (1797–1859), British MP for West Norfolk
- Joe Astley (1899–1967), English footballer
- John Astley (disambiguation), multiple people
- Jon Astley, British record producer
- Judy Astley, English author
- Justin Astley (born 1983), English snooker player
- Mark Astley (born 1969), Canadian ice hockey player
- Neil Astley (born 1953), British publisher, editor and writer
- Philip Astley (1742–1814), English circus performer
- Rick Astley (born 1966), British singer
- Robert Astley (born 1944), Chairman of the Canada Pension Plan Investment Board
- Thea Astley (1925–2004), Australian novelist and short story writer
- Thomas Astley (died 1759), English bookseller and publisher
- Virginia Astley (born 1959), English singer-songwriter
- William Astley (1855–1911), Australian short story writer

== Given name ==
- Sir Astley Cooper (1768–1841), English surgeon and anatomist
- Astley Jones, newsreader and continuity announcer
- Sir Astley Cooper Key (1821–1888), Royal Navy officer

== See also ==
- Astley baronets
