= Health in Laos =

Health of the population of Laos

Health in Laos refers to the health of the population of Laos. Life expectancy in Laos was estimated at 67.78 years in 2021. Malnutrition, especially in children, is most prevalent in rural areas and among ethnic minorities. Poor sanitation, and tropical diseases including malaria are strains on the population's health.

Lao health has improved in the period since Laos joined the World Health Organization in 1950: in addition to life expectancy increases, malaria deaths and tuberculosis prevalence have decreased and the maternal mortality ratio (MMR) has declined by 75%.

Healthcare in Laos is provided by both the private and public sectors.

== Life expectancy ==
Laotian life expectancy at birth has historically fallen behind that of its neighbors, a phenomenon partially influenced by disproportionate infant and childhood mortality. The life expectancy at birth for women and men in Laos was estimated in 1988 at 49 years, the same as in Cambodia and at least 10 years lower than in any other Southeast Asian country. Laotian life expectancy has shown improvement since the 1990s, reaching 55 years in 2002, 66 years in 2015, and 67.78 years in 2021. Life expectancy in Laos has historicallly been and is currently exceeded by the expectancies of neighboring countries, including Vietnam (69.3 years in 2002, 74.0 in 2021) and Thailand (69.6, 76.28). Female life expectancy in Laos exceeds male life expectancy: in 1990, female life expectancy was 54.6 years while male life expectancy was 50.6 years. This trend has continued as both figures have increased, with 2021 estimates placing female life expectancy at 70.4 years and male life expectancy at 65.4 years. Males and females in Laos exhibited the highest increase in life expectancy amongst the Western Pacific Region from 1990-2021 (15.8 years and 16.3 years, respectively). The life expectancy increases in the 1990-2021 period can be attributed primarily to decreased mortality among the under-5, 5-24, and 25-44 age groups. Mortality due to environmental and occupational risks declined in Laos over this period, a trend also exhibited in other middle-income countries in the region, including Cambodia.

== Infant and neonatal mortality ==
Children's deaths are primarily due to communicable diseases: malaria, acute respiratory infections, and diarrhea are the main causes of mortality and morbidity. Vaccination against childhood diseases was expanding, while in 1989 Vientiane's municipal authorities were unable to vaccinate more than 50% of targeted children. Other provinces have lower rates of immunization. Malaria exists among adults and children, with the parasite Plasmodium falciparum involved in 80 to 90% of the cases.

In 1988, the Ministry of Public Health estimated the infant mortality rate (IMR) at 109 per 1,000 and the under-5 mortality rate at 180 per 1,000. The United Nations Children's Fund (UNICEF—see Glossary) believed these figures underestimated the true mortality rate and still represented decreases from rates in 1960. Whereas the infant mortality rate for Vientiane was about 50 per 1,000, in some rural areas it was estimated to be as high as 350 per 1,000 live births; that is, 35% of all children died before the age of 1. 2017 estimates place the Laotian IMR at 39 per 1000 live births (down from 191 per 1000 in the 1978-1987 period) and its neonatal mortality rate (NMR) at 18 (down from 117 in the 1978-1987 period). Women may restrict their diets postpartum in accordance with traditional practices, sometimes leading to nutrient deficiencies in mothers and children. Certain studies suggest that the thiaminases in herbal tea and fish paste, fixtures of postpartum diets, may contribute to thiamine deficiencies in infants, which is associated with sudden infant death syndrome.

== Conditions and issues ==
=== Malaria ===
In the first malaria eradication program between 1956 and 1960, DDT was sprayed over most of the country. Since 1975 the government has increased its activities to eliminate malaria. The Ministry of Public Health operates provincial stations to monitor and combat malaria through diagnosis and treatment. Prevention measures involve chemical prophylaxis to high-risk groups, elimination of mosquito breeding sites, and promotion of individual protection. The campaign has had some success: the ministry reported a decline in the infected population from 26% to 15% between 1975 and 1990.

In 1999, aiming to curtail malaria mortality and morbidity, the World Health Organization began the Mekong Malaria Program. The program was intended primarily to address the disproportionate incidence and effects of malaria in the Greater Mekong Subregion (GMS), which includes Laos and several other countries bordering the Mekong River basin.

=== Diarrheal diseases ===
As of 1993, regular outbreaks of diarrheal diseases occurred annually at the beginning of the rainy season when drinking water is contaminated by human and animal wastes washing down hillsides. Some rural households have pit or water seal toilets, and people sometimes relieve themselves in the brush or forested areas surrounding each village. For children in these villages, some of whom are undernourished, diarrhea is life-threatening because it results in dehydration and can precipitate malnutrition.

Acute watery diarrhea (AWD) was designated as a National Notifiable disease in Laos in 2004. The Lao People's Democratic Republic Early Warning and Response Network (LAOEWARN), designed to report cases of AWD, saw first use in 2008.

According to 2015 estimates, around 11% of mortality in Laos in children under five years old was attributable to diarrheal disease.

=== Nutrition ===
A 2022 estimate placed Laotian stunting rates at 31.5%, the highest among neighbors Vietnam (20%), Cambodia (22%), and Myanmar (27%). The Laotian urban stunting rate is more moderate, at around 24%, while rural rates average 39% with some individual rural provinces exceeding 50%.

The nutritional status of adults is related to what is being grown on the family farm, and to dietary habits.

=== HIV/AIDS ===
More permissive attitudes of Laotian men toward sex and prostitution facilitated the transmission of human immunodeficiency virus (HIV) during the 1980s and 1990s, making HIV infection and acquired immune deficiency syndrome (AIDS) a growing concern. In 1992 a focused sample of about 7,600 urban residents identified 1 AIDS case and 14 persons who tested HIV positive.

A 2017 survey of Vientiane healthcare professionals found that almost 50% of the 277 doctors and 281 nurses that participated exhibited stigma regarding individuals with HIV or AIDS, though the rates of stigma were lesser among those with more work experience and knowledge surrounding HIV/AIDS patients.

Antiretroviral therapy (ART) was made available to HIV patients in Laos starting in 2001, though adherence to the therapy varies along lines such as education and illicit drug use.

=== Maternal and child health ===
The 2010 maternal mortality rate per 100,000 births for Lao People's Democratic Republic is 580. This is compared with 339.2 in 2008 and 1215.4 in 1990.

The under 5 mortality rate, per 1,000 births is 61 and the neonatal mortality as a percentage of under 5's mortality is 38. In Lao People's Democratic Republic the number of midwives per 1,000 live births is 2 and the lifetime risk of death for pregnant women 1 in 49.

== Infrastructure ==
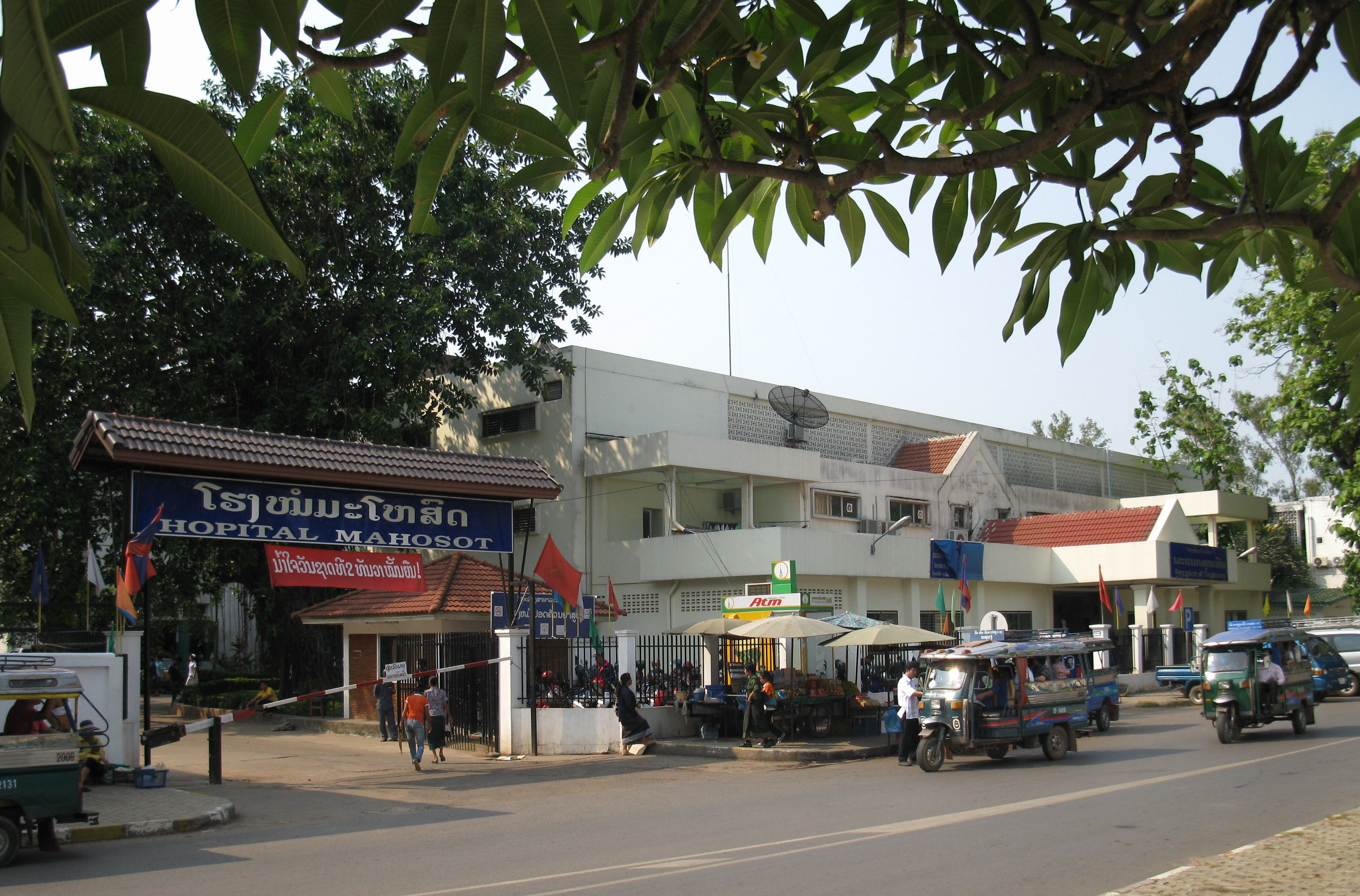
Mahosot Hospital in Vientiane.

According to figures from 1988, less than 5% of the total government budget was targeted for health, with the result that the Ministry of Public Health was unable to establish a management and planning system to facilitate envisioned changes. UNICEF considered the effort to construct a primary health care system to have failed entirely.

Official statistics identified hospitals in 15 of the 16 provinces, plus some in Vientiane, and clinics in 110 districts and more than 1,000 subdistricts. In 1989, 20 of district clinics actually provided services. Clean water and latrines were unavailable at most health posts, and electricity was unavailable at 85% of district clinics, rendering vaccine storage impossible. Drugs and equipment stored in the central warehouses are more seldomly distributed to outlying provinces, and in some situations, patients had to purchase Western pharmaceuticals from private pharmacies that imported stock from Thailand or Vietnam.

The number of health care personnel has increased since 1975, and in 1990 the ministry reported 1,095 physicians, 3,313 medical assistants, and 8,143 nurses. Most personnel are concentrated in the Vientiane area, where the population per physician ratio (1,400 to 1) is more than 10 times higher than in the provinces. In 1989 the national ratio was 2.6 physicians per 10,000 persons.

Training medical personnel at all levels emphasizes theory at the expense of practical skills and relies on curricula similar to those used prior to 1975. International foreign aid donors supported plans for a school of public health, and texts were written and published in Lao. As of 1990, the school did not exist, because of delays in approval of its structure and difficulties in finding trainers with the appropriate background.

Traditional medicine practitioners who know how to use medicinal plants are sometimes consulted for illnesses. The Institute of Traditional Medicine of the Ministry of Public Health formulated and marketed a number of preparations from medicinal plants. Spirit healers in some cases used medicinal plants while sometimes relied on rituals to identify a disease and effect a cure. Some Laotians found no contradiction in consulting spirit curers and Western-trained medical personnel.

In rural areas, vendors sometimes make up packets of drugs—sometimes including an antibiotic, vitamins, and a fever suppressant—and sell them as single-dose cures for a variety of ailments.

Official ambulances are mainly used to transfer patients between hospitals and charge patients for their services. In 2010, a group of volunteers established Vientiane Rescue to operate the country's first free ambulance service around the clock. Vientiane Rescue includes more than 200 volunteers and operated from 4 locations in Vientiane. It consists of 8 ambulances, including the country's first Emergency Medical Service; a 1-truck fire-fighting unit; a 1-boat scuba rescue team and specialised hydraulic rescue and excavation teams. Vientiane Rescue responds to 15–30 accidents a day and between 2011 and 2015 helped save an estimated 10 thousand lives. For its contribution to saving Laotian lives, Vientiane Rescue was awarded the 2016 Ramon Magsaysay Award.

== See also ==
- Lao Red Cross Society
