= Richard Ashley =

Richard Ashley may refer to:

- Richard Ashley (musician) (1774–1836), English musician
- Richard Ashley (cricketer) (1902–1974), British cricketer
- Richard K. Ashley, American international relations scholar
