= John Ashley =

John Ashley may refer to:

- John Ashley (actor) (1934–1997), American actor, producer and singer
- John Ashley (priest) (19th century), Anglican priest
- John Ashley (ice hockey) (1930–2008), Canadian ice hockey referee
- John Ashley (bandit) (1888 or 1895–1924), American outlaw, bank robber, bootlegger and pirate
- John Ashley (musician) (c. 1734–1805), English musician
- John James Ashley (1772–1815), English musician
- John Ashley (Bath musician) (c. 1760–1830), bassoonist, singer and songwriter

== See also ==
- John Astley (disambiguation)
