= Emelda Okiro =

Kenyan public health researcher

Emelda Aluoch Okiro
- Born: 1977 (age 48–49)
- Education: Egerton University; Open University; University of Warwick
- Scientific career
- Workplaces: Kenya Medical Research Institute; University of Nairobi; Institute for Health Metrics and Evaluation; Bill & Melinda Gates Foundation; Kenya Medical Research Institute; Wellcome Trust
- Thesis: Transmission dynamics of respiratory syncytial virus within the household and the community (2007)

Emelda Aluoch Okiro (born 1977) is a Kenyan public health researcher who is lead of the Population Health Unit at the Kenya Medical Research Institute–Wellcome Trust program in Kenya. She looks to understand the determinants of health transitions and to evaluate access to health information. She is a Fellow of the African Academy of Sciences.

== Early life and education ==
Okiro was born in Kenya, one of nine siblings. She went to school in Nairobi and Kitale. She was an undergraduate Egerton University, where she majored in biochemistry and chemistry. She completed her doctoral research between the Open University and University of Warwick, studying the respiratory syncytial virus (RSV) and how it is transmitted in the household and community. She collected data in Kilifi, where almost twenty thousand infants a year are hospitalised from RSV-induced pneumonia. She showed that saliva samples could be used to diagnose RSV, which would avoid the need for blood samples. After earning her doctorate, she moved to the University of Nairobi, where she worked on malaria. She studied how plasmodium falciparum varied in sites with different malaria endemicities. She moved to the University of Washington Institute for Health Metrics and Evaluation, where she worked on the Access, Bottlenecks, Costs and Equity (ABCE) project.

== Research and career ==
Okiro worked as a program officer at the Bill & Melinda Gates Foundation, where she was based in the Global Health Team. She studied the impact of malaria control and anti-retroviral programs, and was responsible for setting up and coordinating the Malaria Modelling Consortium. She left the Foundation to work at the Philips Research Lab in Africa.

Okiro was appointed to the Population Health Unit at the Kenya Medical Research Institute–Wellcome Trust in 2016. She is investigating the epidemiology of malaria, and works to strengthen the use of health data in policy making. She is interested in the spatial heterogeneity of child survival across Kenya. She was elected to the African Academy of Sciences in 2020.

In 2022, Okiro was one of five African researchers to be awarded a Wellcome Trust Senior Research Fellowship. That year she was made professor.

== Selected publications ==
- Wendy P O'Meara; Phillip Bejon; Tabitha W Mwangi; Emelda A Okiro; Norbert Peshu; Bob Snow; Charles R J C Newton; Kevin Marsh (1 November 2008). "Effect of a fall in malaria transmission on morbidity and mortality in Kilifi, Kenya". The Lancet. 372 (9649): 1555–1562. doi:10.1016/s0140-6736(08)61655-4. ISSN 0140-6736. PMC 2607008. PMID 18984188. Wikidata Q37023420.
- Simon I Hay; Emelda A Okiro; Peter W Gething; Anand P Patil; Andrew J Tatem; Carlos A Guerra; Robert W Snow (June 2010). "Estimating the Global Clinical Burden of Plasmodium falciparum Malaria in 2007". PLOS Medicine. 7 (6) e1000290. doi:10.1371/journal.pmed.1000290. ISSN 1549-1277. PMC 2885984. PMID 20563310. Wikidata Q17485684.
- Emelda A Okiro; Simon Iain Hay; Priscilla W Gikandi; Shahnaaz K Sharif; Abdisalan M Noor; Norbert Peshu; Kevin Marsh; Bob Snow (15 November 2007). "The decline in paediatric malaria admissions on the coast of Kenya". Malaria Journal. 6: 151. doi:10.1186/1475-2875-6-151. ISSN 1475-2875. PMC 2194691. PMID 18005422. Wikidata Q36372814.

== Personal life ==
Okiro is on the International Advisory Board of The Lancet.
