= Elizabeth Ashley (scientist) =

British microbiologist

- Born: Croydon
- Education: St. Thomas's Hospital Medical School
- Scientific career
- Workplaces: University of Oxford
- Thesis: New directions in artemisinin-based combination therapy : chemotherapeutic studies of multi-drug resistant falciparum malaria. (2007)

Elizabeth Ashley is a British physician who is Director of the Laos-Oxford-Mahosot Hospital-Wellcome Trust Research Unit (LOMWRU) in Laos. She specialises in infectious diseases and medical microbiology and virology. She is an associate editor for the Malaria Journal and serves on the Council of the International Society for Infectious Diseases.

== Early life and education ==
Ashley grew up in Croydon. She attended a comprehensive school, where she specialised in mathematics, science and French. She became interested in medicine as a teenager, and trained as a physician in London. She completed an intercalated degree in sociology. In 2000, Ashley moved to Mae Sot, to the Shoklo Malaria Research Unit to provide healthcare for people living around the Thai-Myanmar border. She worked under the supervision of Nick White and Francois Nosten. She realised that malaria research was her vocation in 2006. Based on her experiences in these places, Ashley completed a doctorate on chemotherapeutic studies. She worked as a clinician in Paris and London. In Paris she worked for Médecins Sans Frontières. Her current place of work, LOMWRU is in the Mahosot Hospital in Laos.

== Research and career ==
Ashley was appointed head of the Tracking Resistance to Artemisinin Collaboration (TRAC) in 2011. Under her leadership, the organisation mapped the extent of artemisinin resistance in Plasmodium falciparum. The trial included 15 sites in 10 counties of Asia and Africa.

In 2016, Ashley was appointed the Director of Clinical Research at the Myanmar Oxford Clinical Research Unit (MOCRU). She was appointed Director of the Laos-Oxford-Mahosot Hospital-Wellcome Trust Research Unit (LOMWRU) in Laos in 2019. The research collaboration involves almost 100 scientists, and studies infectious diseases in Vientiane. She has overseen the development of antimicrobial prescribing guidelines in Lao. Ashley was appointed Professor of Tropical Medicine in 2020.

== Selected publications ==
- Elizabeth A Ashley; Mehul Dhorda; Rick M Fairhurst; et al. (31 July 2014). "Spread of Artemisinin Resistance in Plasmodium falciparum Malaria". The New England Journal of Medicine. 371 (5): 411-23, 411-423. doi:10.1056/nejmoa1314981. ISSN 0028-4793. PMC 4143591. PMID 25075834. Wikidata Q21032481.
- Patrick S Schnable; Doreen Ware; Robert S Fulton; et al. (1 November 2009). "The B73 maize genome: complexity, diversity, and dynamics". Science. 326 (5956): 1112–1115. Bibcode:2009Sci...326.1112S. doi:10.1126/science.1178534. ISSN 0036-8075. PMID 19965430. Wikidata Q22065899.
- Aung Pyae Phyo; Standwell Nkhoma; Kasia Stepniewska; et al. (26 May 2012). "Emergence of artemisinin-resistant malaria on the western border of Thailand: a longitudinal study". The Lancet. 379 (9830): 1960–6. doi:10.1016/s0140-6736(12)60484-x. ISSN 0140-6736. PMC 3525980. PMID 22484134. Wikidata Q24598695.
