= Asley =

Asley is both a surname and a given name. Notable people with the name include:

- Yasha Asley (born 2002), British mathematics child prodigy
- Asley González (born 1989), Cuban judoka

== See also ==
- Ashley (given name)
- Ashley (surname)
- Astley (name)
