= Charles Ashley =

Charles Ashley may refer to:

- Charles S. Ashley (1858–1941), mayor of New Bedford, Massachusetts, 1897–1905
- Charles Jane Ashley (1773–1843), English musician
- General Charles Ashley (c. 1770–1818), English musician
- Charles F. Ashley (1936–2011), American politician in the Alabama House of Representatives

== See also ==
- Ashley Charles (born 1999), Grenadian footballer
