= Kualao Restaurant =

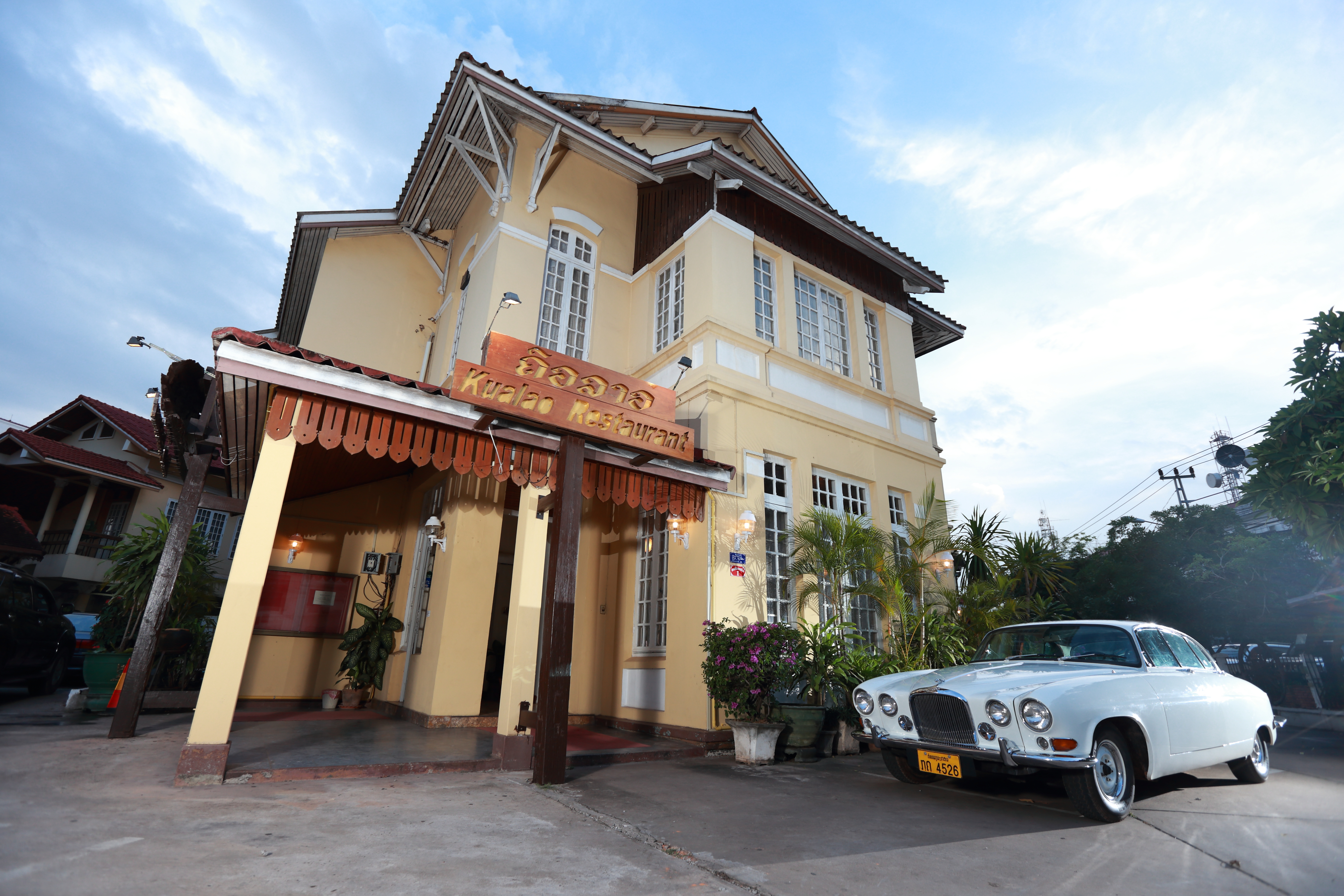
- Restored French Colonial Villa (Kualao)
- Interactive map of Kualao Restaurant

Restaurant information
- Established: 1994
- Owner: Manola Daravong
- Food type: Lao
- Location: 134 Samsenthai Road (Xiengyeun, Chanthabouly District), Vientiane Capital, Laos
- Coordinates: 17.9647°N 102.6105°E
- Seating capacity: 450
- Reservations: Yes
- Other locations: None

Kualao Restaurant is a Lao restaurant in Vientiane, the capital city of Laos. It provides upscale Lao cuisine and showcases traditional Lao dance and music performances to its clientele.

== Location and history ==
The Kualao Restaurant compound occupies an area of approximately 2200 square meters in Xiengyeun Village, Chanthabouly District, Vientiane. This location is known as the That Dam Intersection as its namesake, the ‘Black Stupa’, sits at the center of the nearby roundabout. The restaurant itself is housed in a two-story colonial villa. The public areas of the compound consist of a large, high-ceilinged room that serves as the main dining hall, a VIP room and two function halls. The building has been adapted to allow it to function as a restaurant while retaining certain elements of its colonial character.

Oral histories and a map of 1963 Vientiane Capital suggest that the Royal Lao Government made use of the colonial villa as a Tax Department. Until 1993, the house had been the government-owned residence of former Lao Deputy Minister of Education, Khampong Phankongsa, who had been residing there for a number of years (a convenience offered to civil servants for their public service). After an agreement was reached between the Ministry of Finance (responsible for managing state property) and the Deputy Minister, Kualao Restaurant was granted an operating license by the Ministry of Information, Culture and Tourism in 1994. It was opened by the Lane Xang Travel Company, along with Hotel Lao, to meet the Government of Laos’ requirement, at that time, for all travel and tour companies to provide a full-service tourism operation, including a hotel and a restaurant, in order to obtain a tourism business license.

Kualao Restaurant was founded and is currently owned and managed by Manola Daravong.

== Cuisine ==
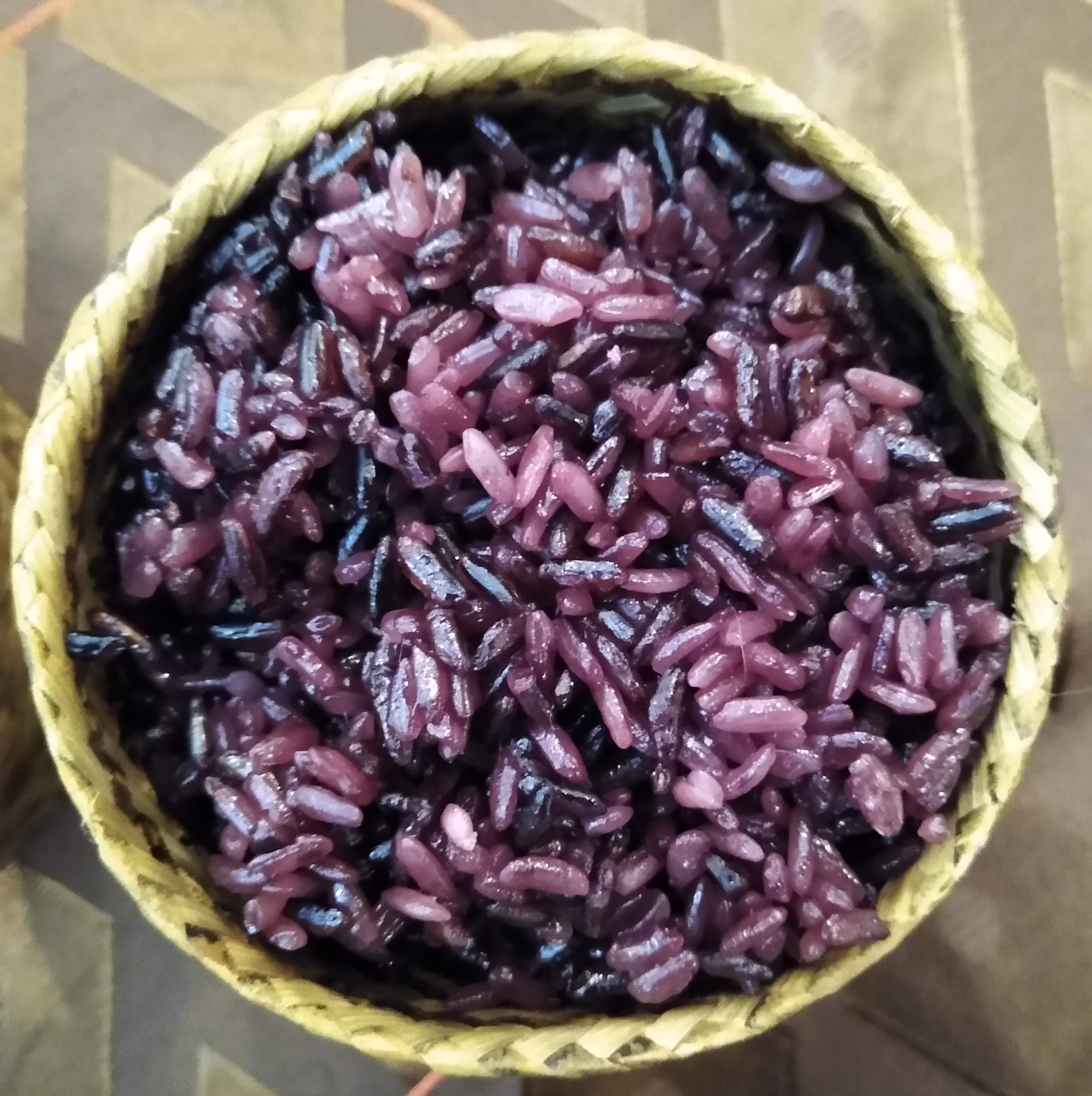
Sticky rice at Kualao Restaurant

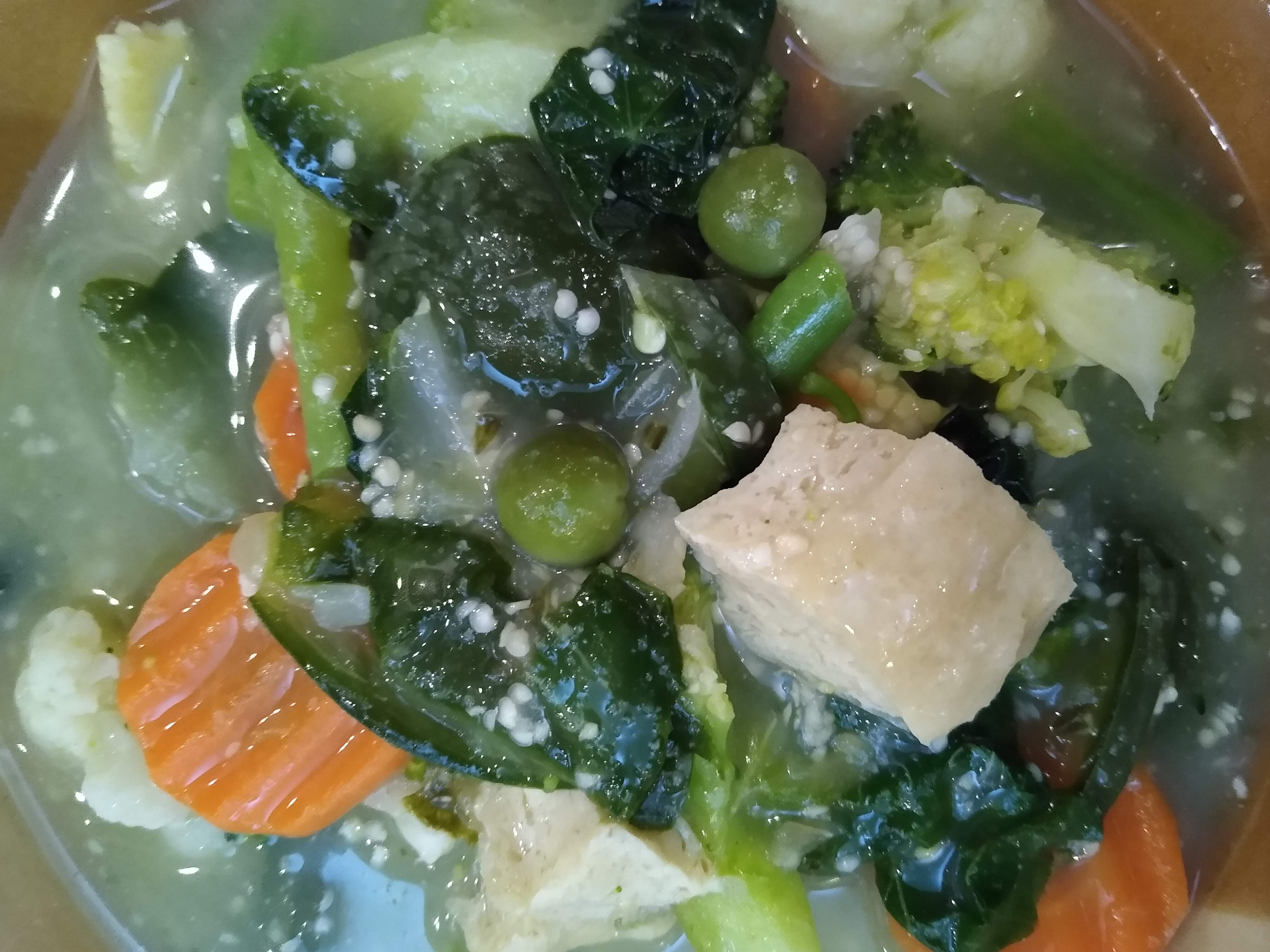
Vegetarian or-larm stew at Kualao Restaurant

Kualao Restaurant employs ethnically Lao chefs and produces traditional Lao dishes using local ingredients. The restaurant serves many typical Lao dishes, including sticky rice (also called glutinous rice), which is steamed in a woven bamboo basket, larb, a minced meat salad which is widely regarded as the ‘national dish’ of Laos and the Pakao, a large set menu served on a traditional rattan platter that includes small portions of many of the most common Lao dishes. Local desserts, such as Nam Vaan, a sweet fruit salad mixed with rice balls and coconut milk and served in a coconut shell, are also included on the menu.

== Public and media reception ==
Kualao Restaurant is frequented by tourists, international visitors and Lao eaters. Certain travel forums, such as TripAdvisor, have generally favorable reviews of the restaurant and, whilst many tourists appear to appreciate the opportunity to experience Lao food and entertainment in a clean and modern environment. On the other hand, some reviewers feel it is an overpriced ‘tourist trap’ and note that there are other restaurants serving similar dishes in Vientiane at lower prices.

Some customers have also questioned the authenticity of Kualao Restaurant’s food as traditional Laotian fare. Critics cite the inclusion of Thai and Chinese dishes on the menu and the inclusion of monosodium glutamate (MSG) in some dishes as key factors affecting authenticity.

In 2011, Kualao was named ‘Restaurant of the Year' by the Tourism Alliance Awards at the International Travel Expo, in HCM, Vietnam.

Kualao Restaurant was featured in the #1 New York Times Bestselling book 1,000 Places to See Before You Die by Patricia Schultz.

Fodor’s Travel referred to Kualao Restaurant as “one of Vientiane’s best Lao restaurants.”

The New York Times featured Kualao Restaurant in an article in 2007 entitled ‘The Centuries-Old Allure of Laos’s Relaxed Capital’ where journalist Daniel Altman wrote "some colonial gems have also reached an international standard, like Kualao."

J&C Expats Article Contributor, Russell J. Peterson has described the cuisine served at Kualao as "exceptional."
