= John James Ashley =

English musician

John James Ashley (1772–1815), was a musician in London.

Ashley was the second son of John Ashley and a brother of Richard Ashley, Charles Jane Ashley, and General Charles Ashley. A pupil of Schroeter, he was for several years organist at Covent Garden Theatre. He was one of the most successful singing masters of his day, some of his most celebrated pupils being Mrs. Vaughan, Mrs. Salmon, and Charles Smith. He composed some pianoforte music and a few sets of songs. He became a member of the Royal Society of Musicians 5 August 1792, and died on 5 January 1815.
