= Vientiane Bus Station =

List of bus stations in Vientiane, Laos

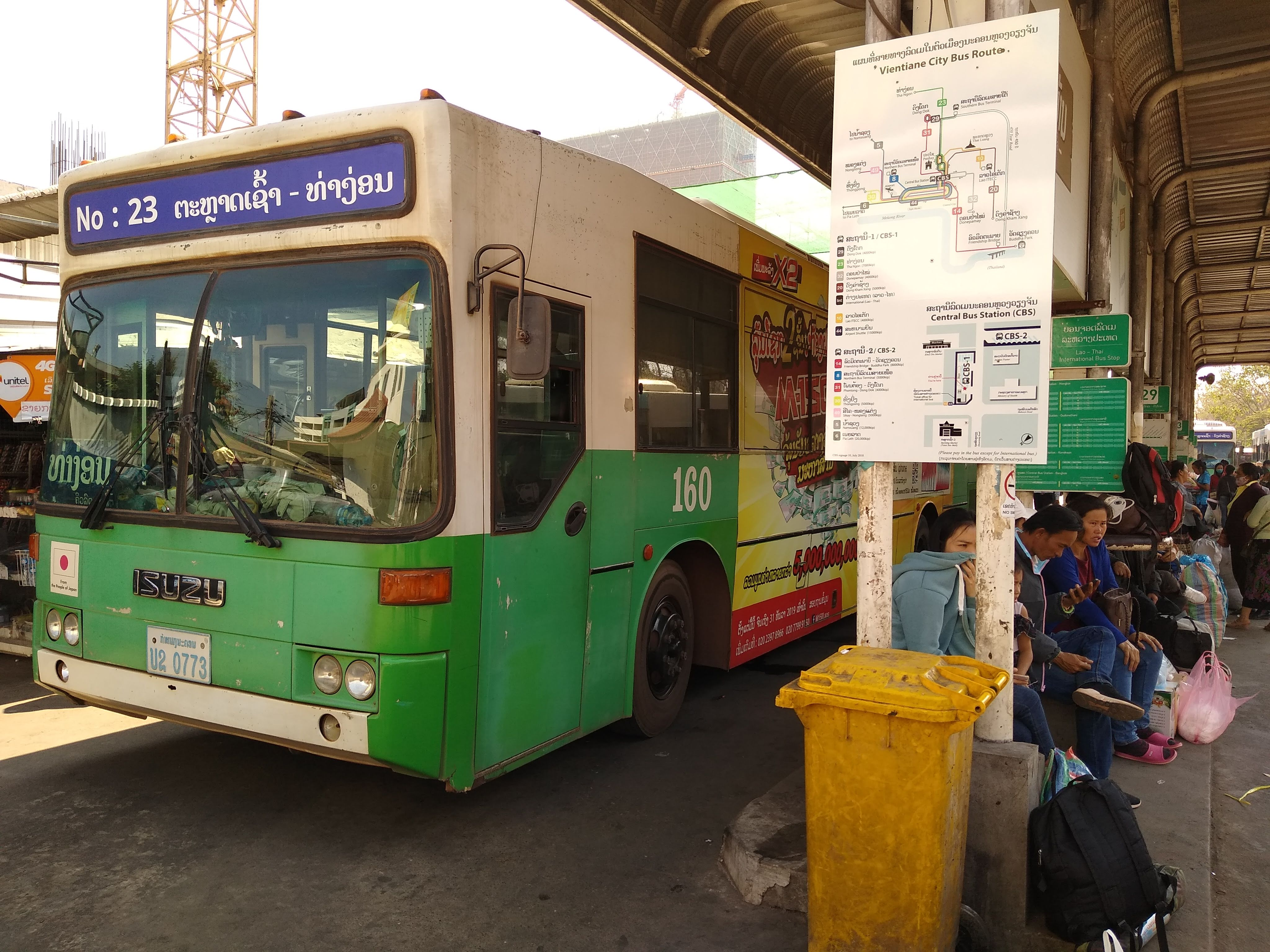
Central Bus Station

There are 3 (main) bus stations in Vientiane, the capital of Laos: Vientiane bus tracking website https://lao.busnavi.asia/

- Central Bus Station: Located in the city (opposite Morning Market), serving buses that run within the capital city, provinces around it and between Vientiane and Nong Khai, Udon Thani and Khon Kaen in Thailand.
- Northern Bus Station: Located at T2 road, serving buses that run between Vientiane and the Northern part of the country.
- Southern Bus Station: Located in Dong Dok area on the road 13th south, around 10–15 minutes drive from the city center. This station serves buses that run between Vientiane and the Southern provinces, including Thakhek and Savannakhet. This station also serves buses that run between Vientiane and Vietnam and Cambodia.
