= Jacob Astley =

Jacob Astley may refer to:

- Jacob Astley, 1st Baron Astley of Reading (1579–1652), English soldier and royalist
- Sir Jacob Astley, 1st Baronet (c. 1639–1729), English MP for Norfolk
- Sir Jacob Astley, 5th Baronet (1756–1817), English landowner and Member of Parliament
- Jacob Astley, 3rd Baron Astley of Reading (c. 1654–1688), English peer
- Jacob Astley, 16th Baron Hastings (1797–1859), British MP for West Norfolk
