= Lao Red Cross Society =

Humanitarian organization in Laos, est. 1955

The Lao Red Cross Society is a humanitarian organization in Laos. It was established in 1955. It has its headquarters in Vientiane.

Since 1992 it has worked extensively at tackling problems with HIV/AIDS in the country and works approximately with 40,000 annually.
