= Graham Astley =

Australian cricketer (born 1957)

Personal information
- Born: 31 March 1957 (age 69); Sydney, Australia

Domestic team information
- Years: Team
- 1983-1984: Tasmania
- Source: Cricinfo, 20 March 2016

Graham Astley (born 31 March 1957) is an Australian former cricketer. He played one first-class match for Tasmania 1983/84.

== See also ==
- List of Tasmanian representative cricketers
