= That Dam =

Stupa in Vientiane, Laos

Coordinates: 17.9660°N 102.6111°E

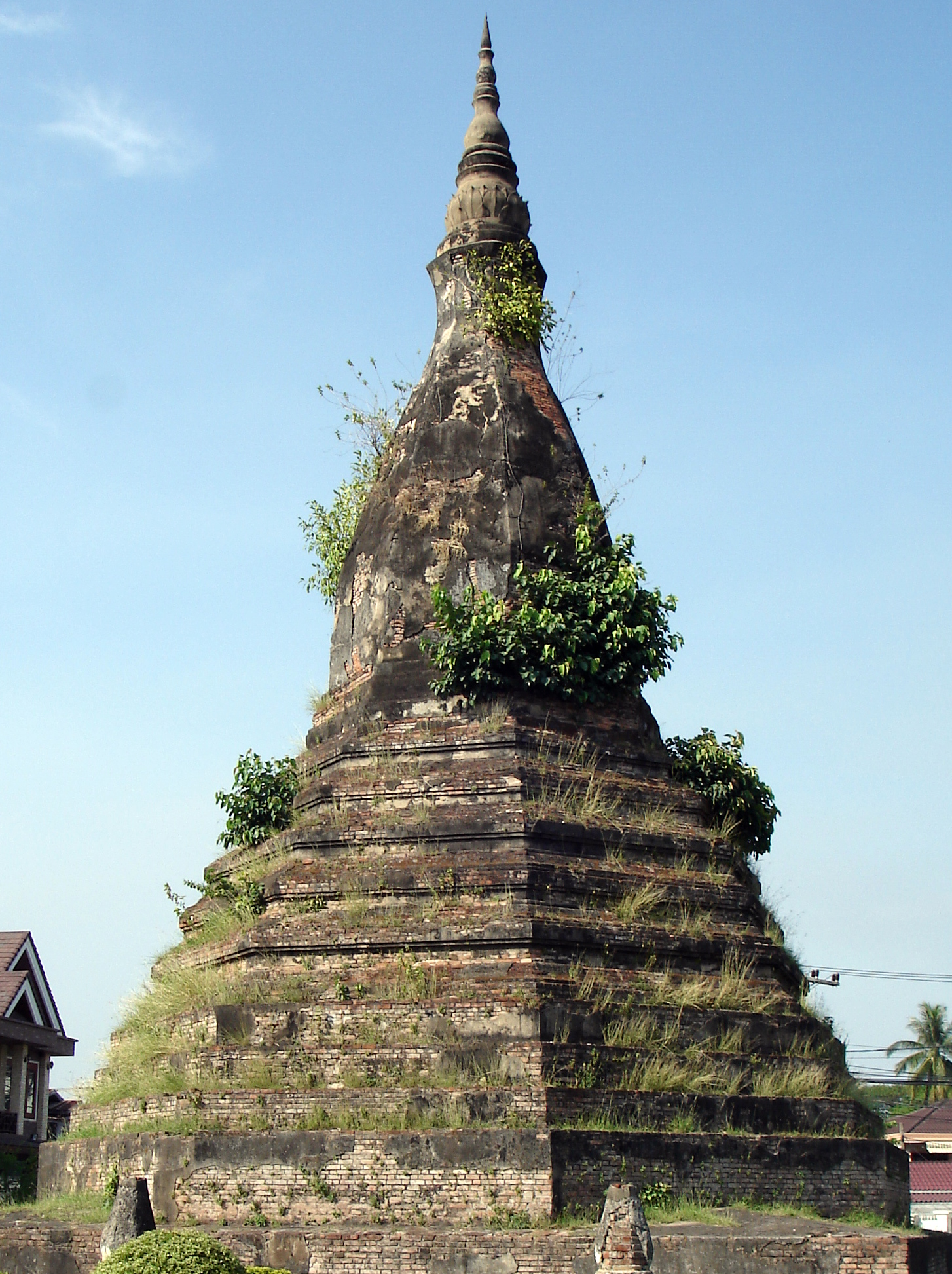
That Dam

That Dam (Lao ທາດດຳ [tʰâːt dàm], meaning Black Stupa) is a large stupa located in Vientiane, Laos. It is situated in the middle of the roundabout between Chantha Khoumane road and Bartholoni road.

That Dam was constructed during the early Lan Xang period, which lasted from 1354 to 1707.

There are multiple myths surrounding That Dam. It is said to be inhabited by a seven-headed nāga who tried to protect Vientiane from the invasion by the Siamese army dring the Lao rebellion in 1827, and to have been covered by gold that was stolen by the Siamese.
