= Wat Sri Chomphu Ong Tue =

Coordinates: 17.88923°N 102.57414°E

Wat Sri Chomphu Ong Tue, Wat Ongtue or Wat Nam Mong is a Buddhist temple in Thailand. The temple houses Luang Pho Phraehao Ongtue one of the largest Buddha representations in all of Laos which stands four meters tall and is believed to have been cast in 1562.
