= John Ashley (Bath musician) =

English vocalist and bassoon player

John Ashley, known as "Ashley of Bath," (c. 1760 - 1830) was a performer on the bassoon and a vocalist in his native city of Bath, Somerset, England, active for over fifty years.

He is chiefly remembered as the writer and composer of a large number of songs and ballads (between the years 1780 and 1830), many of which acquired considerable popularity. He is also deserving of notice as the author of two ingenious pamphlets in answer to Richard Clark's work on the origin of the British national anthem: Reminiscences and Observations Respecting the Origin of the National Anthem Called "God Save the King!", 1827; 'A Letter to the Rev. W. L. Bowles, supplementary to the Observations, etc.' 1828, both published at Bath.

== Works ==
- Royal Dorsetshire march. 2 Flutes, 2 clarinets, 2 trumpets, 2 horns and double bass. pub. London, c. 1795
