= John Ashley (musician) =

John Ashley (c. 1734–1805) was an English musician who was the father of a family of musicians who flourished towards the end of the eighteenth century.

Ashley became a member of the Royal Society of Musicians on 7 April 1765. At the Handel commemoration in 1784, he was assistant conductor to Joah Bates. On the same occasion, the double bassoon was played by a 'Mr. Ashley of the Guards', who is sometimes supposed to have been the same individual, but was more probably another member of the family, possibly his brother Jane, who was born in 1740 and died at Westminster on 5 April 1809.

John Ashley in 1795 undertook the management of the oratorio concerts at Covent Garden. According to the official book commemorating the 300th anniversary of the Worshipful Company of Musicians, he served as Master in 1804, the year of its bicentenary. He died in Abingdon Street, Westminster, on 2 March 1805, where his wife also died on 22 December 1809, aged 75.

Richard Ashley (1775 – 1836), one of John Ashley's sons, was a performer on the violin, but he does not seem to have made any mark as a musician. He became a member of the Royal Society of Musicians 17 April 1796, and died in October 1836. He was also the father of Charles Jane Ashley, General Charles Ashley, and John James Ashley.
