= Joe Astley =

English footballer

John Emmanuel "Joe" Astley (April 1899 – October 1967) was an English footballer. His regular position was at full back. He was born in Dudley, Worcestershire. He played for Manchester United, Cradley Heath, and Notts County.
