= Edward Astley =

Edward Astley may refer to:

- Sir Edward Astley, 4th Baronet (1729–1802), British MP for Norfolk
- Edward Astley, 22nd Baron Hastings (1912–2007), British peer, soldier and businessman
