= Maurice Ashley (disambiguation) =

Maurice Ashley (born 1966) is a Jamaican-American chess grandmaster.

Maurice Ashley may also refer to:

- Maurice Ashley (historian) (1907–1994), English historian
- Maurice Ashley (MP) (1675–1726), British politician
