= Robert Ashley (disambiguation) =

Robert Ashley (1930–2014) was an American composer.

Robert Ashley may also refer to:

- Robert Ashley (died 1433), MP for Wiltshire
- Robert Ashley (writer) (1565–1641), MP for Dorchester and writer
- Bob Ashley (1953–2024), member of the West Virginia House of Delegates
- Robert P. Ashley Jr. (born 1960), U.S. Army lieutenant general, Director of the Defense Intelligence Agency 2017–present
- Bob Ashley (EastEnders), EastEnders character
