= Henry Ashley =

Henry Ashley may refer to:

- Henry Ashley (American politician) (1778–1829), U.S. representative from New York
- Henry Ashley (MP for Dorset) (1519–1588), MP for Shaftesbury and Dorset
- Henry Ashley (MP, born 1548), MP for Wareham, Poole and Christchurch
- Henry Ashley (Dorchester MP) (1807–1858), English politician and cricketer
