= Charles Jane Ashley =

English cellist

Charles Jane Ashley (1773 – 29 August 1843) was an English cellist.

Ashley was born in London, the third son of musician John Ashley. He was a performer on the violoncello, and also for some time carried on the Covent Garden oratorios with his brother, General Charles Ashley, a violinist. He was also the brother of Richard and John James Ashley. According to the official book commemorating the 300th anniversary of the Worshipful Company of Musicians (published in 1904/5), he was one of the founders of the Glee Club in 1793 and an original member of the Philharmonic Society of London.

On 2 May 1811, he was elected secretary of the Royal Society of Musicians, of which he had been a member since 4 May 1794. In 1791 and from 1794 to 1801, he was named by the Governors to play for the clergy of St. Paul's Cathedral, at the society's annual May benefits concert. After his father's death in 1805, he and his brother Christopher continued the oratorios, and by 1817 he was a violoncellist in a band at the King's Theatre. In the latter part of his life, he was for some time. the manager of the Tivoli Gardens at Margate, where he died on 29 August 1843.

During his later years, before his death in 1843, Charles became quite weak in health, which may have been due to the 19 years he spent in prison over debt. The payments made to him for medical assistance from 1835, were recorded in The Minute Books of the Royal Society of Musicians.
