= Astley Jones =

Astley Jones is a newsreader and continuity announcer on BBC Radio 4. After beginning his career as a PE teacher, he took up work as a BBC Sports correspondent. He has followed a freelance career since 1975, working on Radios 2, 3, 4 and World Service as well as a stint in television. He has also worked for the British Forces Broadcasting Service (BFBS). He also had a bit part in the Blake's 7 Season 1 episode - "Seek Locate Destroy" as a scientist working on a Federation Base.
