= Vientiane Rescue =

Volunteer-run rescue service in Laos

Vientiane Rescue is a volunteer-run rescue service in Vientiane, Laos. Responding to over 5,760 road accidents annually (2015 figures), Vientiane Rescue is the largest such service in the country. It is made up of over 200 volunteers, eight ambulances, a fire-fighting unit, a scuba rescue team as well as hydraulic rescue and excavation teams.

Vientiane Rescue was among the six recipients of the 2016 Ramon Magsaysay Award.

== History ==
In 2007, a team of volunteers from the Foundation for Assisting Poor People of Lao PDR used a donated ambulance to create Rescue Vientiane Capital to provide first-aid service on weekends. In 2010, Sébastien Perret, a French paramedic and firefighter living in Vientiane, joined the Foundation and alongside Laotian Phaichi Konepathoum and five 15-year-old volunteers established Vientiane Rescue to operate the country's first free, 24/7 rescue service.

During the initial years, volunteers faced a lack of funding, equipment and formal training and often could not respond to calls for help. In 2012, the group lost its only ambulance and the rescue service was suspended for one year while funds were gathered to purchase a new vehicle.

Since then, Vientiane Rescue has grown to more than 200 volunteers working from 4 different locations in Vientiane. They respond to 15-30 accidents a day and, according to the jury of the 2016 Ramon Magsaysay Award, helped save an estimated ten thousand lives between 2011 and 2015.

== Recognition ==
Vientiane Rescue was among the six recipients of the 2016 Ramon Magsaysay Award, commonly regarded as Asia's equivalent of the Nobel Prize. According to the jury, the award "recognizes its heroic work in saving Laotian lives in a time and place of great need, under the most deprived of circumstances, inspiring by their passionate humanitarianism a similar generosity of spirit in many others."

In November 2016, French President François Hollande presented Sébastien Perret and Vientiane Rescue with the La France s'engage Award at a ceremony in Paris.
