= Kevin Marsh (researcher) =

British Malariologist and academic

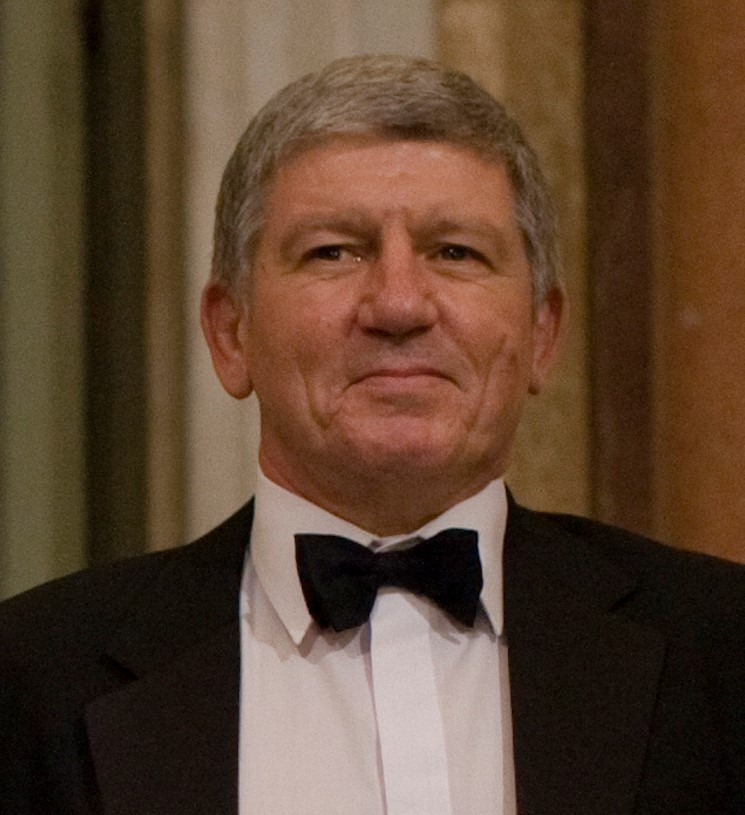
- At the Prince Mahidol Award Ceremony 2010 at the Chakri Maha Prasat Throne Hall Inside the Royal Palace
- Born: August 23, 1954 (age 72)
- Occupations: Malariologist, academic and researcher
- Awards: Chalmers Medal, Royal Society of Tropical Medicine and Hygiene; Prince Mahidol Award for Medicine; Drexel Prize for Infectious Diseases

Academic background
- Education: MB.Ch.B; MRCP; DTM & H
- Alma mater: Liverpool University

Kevin Marsh is a British Malariologist, academic and a researcher. He is a professor of Tropical Medicine and Director of Africa Oxford Initiative at University of Oxford. He is also a senior advisor at African Academy of Sciences.

Marsh has authored around 500 research publications on malarial immunity and pathogenesis. His research is focused in clinical, epidemiological and immunological aspects of malaria. He has also conducted extensive work on developing and strengthening scientific research in Africa.

Marsh chaired the WHO Malaria Policy Advisory Committee from 2012 till 2019 and is a member of numerous international committees relating to malaria and to global health research. He is a Fellow of St Cross College and a Fellow of the Royal College of Physicians, Royal Society of Tropical Medicine and Hygiene, Academy of Medical Sciences, European Academy of Sciences and Arts, African Academy of Sciences and World Academy of Sciences.

== Education ==
Marsh completed his Bachelor of Medicine and Bachelor of Surgery Degree in 1978 from Liverpool University. He received his post graduate diploma in Tropical Medicine and Hygiene in 1982 from Liverpool.

== Career ==
Marsh initiated his research career at the Medical Research Council Unit in the Gambia, where he worked on the immunology of malaria. From 1985 till 1989, he was at the Institute of Molecular Medicine in Oxford. In 1989, he, along with his colleagues, established a series of research projects on the immunology and clinical epidemiology of malaria at Kilifi on the coast of Kenya; these developed into an international programme, the KEMRI Wellcome Trust Research Programme, which he directed until 2014. Marsh has been a professor of Tropical Medicine in Nuffield Department of Medicine at the University of Oxford since 1994 and is currently Director of Africa Oxford Initiative.

Since 2014 Marsh has been senior adviser at the African Academy of sciences, based at their headquarters in Nairobi, where he worked with colleagues to develop the Alliance for Accelerating Excellence in Science in Africa (AESA), a platform aiming to shift the centre of gravity of research to the African continent. He currently co leads the AAS Covid programme which has worked closely with AUDA NEPAD, Africa CDC and WHO Afro to develop COVID-19 research priorities for the continent.

== Research ==
Marsh's research expertise lies in malaria, malaria vaccines, tropical medicine, and child health in Africa. He has conducted research on epidemiological, clinical and immunological aspects of malaria.

== Awards and honors ==
- 1987 - Unilever Research Fellowship, Green College Oxford
- 1994 - Chalmers Medal, Royal Society of Tropical Medicine and Hygiene
- 2004 - Ronald Ross Medal, London School of Hygiene & Tropical Medicine
- 2004 - Fellowship, Academy of Medical Science
- 2008 - Gijs Van Seventer medal, University of Boston
- 2010 - Honorary life member, Australasian Society of Infectious Diseases
- 2010 - Prince Mahidol Award for Medicine
- 2012 - Honorary life member, American Society Tropical Medicine and Hygiene
- 2012 - Fellowship, Royal Society of Biology
- 2015 - Mary Kingsley Medal, Liverpool School of Tropical Medicine
- 2015 - Fellowship, African Academy of Sciences
- 2016 - Al Sumait prize for African development
- 2017 - EMBL lifetime achievement award for research on malaria
- 2017 - Drexel Prize for Infectious Diseases
- 2018 - Elected to the European Academy of Sciences and Arts
- 2019 - Fellow, World Academy of Sciences
