= John Astley =

John Astley may refer to:

- John Astley (courtier) (c. 1507–1596), MP for Cricklade 1559, and for Boroughbridge 1563
- John Astley (Master of the Revels), (died 1641), his son, a politician who became Master of the Revels
- Sir John Astley, 2nd Baronet, of Pateshull (1687–1772), Member of Parliament (MP) for Shrewsbury 1727–1734 and Shropshire 1734–1772
- John Astley (painter) (1720–1787), English portrait painter and beau
- John Astley (clergyman) (1735–1803), Rector of parishes in Norfolk
- Sir John Dugdale Astley, 1st Baronet, of Everley (1778–1842), MP for Wiltshire 1820–1832, Wiltshire North, 1832–1835
- Sir John Dugdale Astley, 3rd Baronet, of Everley (1828–1894), MP for Lincolnshire North 1874–1880
- John Astley (snooker player) (born 1989), English snooker player
- Jon Astley (born 1951), British record producer

== See also ==
- John Ashley (disambiguation)
