= William Ashley =

William Ashley, Bill Ashley or Will Ashley may refer to:

- William Ashley (economic historian) (1860–1927), English economic historian
- Bill Ashley (politician) (1881–1958), Australian politician
- William H. Ashley (1778–1838), American fur trader, entrepreneur, and politician
- Gobo Ashley (William Hare Ashley; 1862–1930), South African cricketer
- Billy Ashley (born 1970), American baseball player
- Will Ashley (actor) (Will Ashley de Leon; born 2002), Filipino actor
- Willie Ashley (1921–1984), U.S. Army Air Force officer and Tuskegee Airman

== See also ==
- William Ashley-Brown (1880–1970), Australian Anglican priest
- William Ashley-Cooper (1803–1877), MP for Dorchester
