= Richard Ashley (cricketer) =

English cricketer

Personal information
- Full name: Richard Ashley
- Born: 27 October 1902; Weston-super-Mare, Somerset, England
- Died: 7 August 1974 (aged 71); Bognor Regis, Sussex, England
- Batting: Right-handed
- Bowling: Unknown-arm fast-medium

Domestic team information
- Years: Team
- 1932: Somerset
- 1937–1938: Mysore
- 1938–1940: Europeans (India)
- First-class debut: 1 June 1932 Somerset v Leicestershire
- Last First-class: 15 November 1939 Europeans (India) v Hindus

Career statistics
Competition	First-class
Matches	4
Runs scored	61
Batting average	10.16
100s/50s	0/0
Top score	17
Balls bowled	307
Wickets	8
Bowling average	22.50
5 wickets in innings	0
10 wickets in match	0
Best bowling	3/26
Catches/stumpings	1/–
- Source: CricketArchive, 24 November 2009

Richard Ashley (27 October 1902 – 7 August 1974) was a first-class cricketer who played two matches for Somerset County Cricket Club in 1932. He also appeared in two first-class matches in India in the late 1930s, playing for Mysore in the Ranji Trophy and for the Europeans (India) in the Bombay Pentangular Tournament. He was a right-handed batsman and a fast-medium bowler, though it is not known whether he bowled with his right or left hand. A 2017 book states that he was born in Weston-super-Mare, Somerset, and died in Bognor Regis, West Sussex; previously it had been thought that he was born at Axbridge and died at Selsey.

== Life and military career ==
The son of a surgeon who later became a medical school inspector, Ashley was educated at Clifton College and the Royal Military College, Sandhurst, and joined the Wiltshire Regiment as a second lieutenant in 1925. He served as aide-de-camp to Sir Charles Innes, governor of Burma, before returning to England in 1930 where his batting and pace bowling in regimental cricket got him noticed by Somerset. He later served in Palestine and before and during the Second World War he was in India, where he was commander of the 7th Battalion of the Wiltshire Regiment. After the War, he held posts in England and Germany before he retired in 1956 with the rank of lieutenant-colonel.

== Cricket career ==
Ashley made his first-class debut for Somerset in June 1932, making 9 runs in his solitary innings and claiming bowling figures of 1/0 off two overs as Somerset drew with Leicestershire. He appeared again at the end of the same month, making 16 runs and not bowling in the innings and 74 run victory over Essex at Leyton.

He played two first-class matches in India: in 1937–38 he captained Mysore against Madras in the Ranji Trophy and in 1939–40 he captained the Europeans team to a heavy defeat by the Hindus in the Bombay Pentangular Tournament.
