= Jacob Astley, 3rd Baron Astley of Reading =

English peer

Jacob Astley, 3rd Baron Astley of Reading (c. 1654 – 1688) was an English peer.

He was the elder son of Isaac Astley, 2nd Baron Astley of Reading and his wife Anne Stydolfe, fourth daughter of Sir Francis Stydolfe. In 1662, he succeeded his father as baron. Astley was educated at St John's College, Cambridge.

He married his cousin Frances Stydolfe, daughter of Sir Richard Stydolfe, 1st Baronet. Their marriage was childless. Astley died at St Margaret's Church in Westminster and was buried in Maidstone in Kent. With his death the barony became extinct.

Peerage of England
Preceded by Isaac Astley	Baron Astley of Reading; 1662 – 1688	Extinct
