= Richard Ashley (musician) =

English musician

Richard Godfrey Ashley (8 September 1774 – 11 October 1836) was an English musician, and a son of John Ashley.

== Early life ==
Ashley was the fourth son of John Ashley, a conductor and bassoonist who became the father of a notable family of musicians (General Charles Ashley, John James Ashley, and Charles Jane Ashley), and his wife, Mary (née Jane). He was born on 8 September 1774, in the parish of St George Hanover Square, London, and baptised in the parish church on 10 September. At 9 years old, Ashley was already performing, participating in Westminster Abbey's 1784 Handel Commemoration and performing at the Pantheon in May and June of the same year.

== Career ==
As of Joseph Doane's Musical Directory (1794), at age 20, Ashley was living at his father's house. At this time, he was employed as a drummer for the Royal Opera House's oratorios, where he worked alongside his family. The Royal Society of Musicians also made him one of the musicians to play at the annual St Paul's Cathedral benefit concert, an honour usually reserved for members of the Society. His father proposed him as a member the following year, a proposal which was ratified in 1796, certifying Ashley as a qualified organist, violinist, violist, and player of kettledrums. He continued to play at this concert from 1795 to 1805, gaining the right to send a deputy in his place in 1806. At several dates in the 1810s, he served on the Society's Court of Assistants.

Ashley enjoyed what one Biographical Dictionary called "a long orchestral and solo concert career". From 1798, he performed in Ranelagh Gardens, under his father's influence. He also performed under his elder brother, John, at the Royal Opera House's oratorios. As of his father's death in 1805, Ashley was apparently in "a better situation than either of his brothers were placed in", according to the will. In 1817, he was part of the King's Theatre Band. According to the Oxford Dictionary of National Biography, "throughout his life he was in demand at major festivals"; it lists him as leading the violas at the Three Choirs festival in 1811, Oxford in 1813, York in 1823, and Chester in 1829. On 8 October 1800, Ashley became a freeman of the Worshipful Company of Musicians, and, on 7 July 1802, entered the Company's livery.

== Personal life ==
At age 42, on 1 April 1816, Ashley married the "spinster", Elizabeth Palmer, at St George Hanover Square. He died on 11 October 1836 at his home of Park Place, Chelsea, having signed his will the previous day. His obituary was published in that year's volume of the Gentleman's Magazine. Elizabeth survived her husband, receiving a widow's allowance of £2 12s 6d by 1837. Later that year, the Society donated £5 for the treatment of Elizabeth's epilepsy, and Elizabeth was dead by 9 January 1839, when £8 was spent on the funeral of "the widow of the late Richard Ashley".
