= Vientiane =

Capital of Laos

Vientiane ວຽງຈັນ
- Capital city
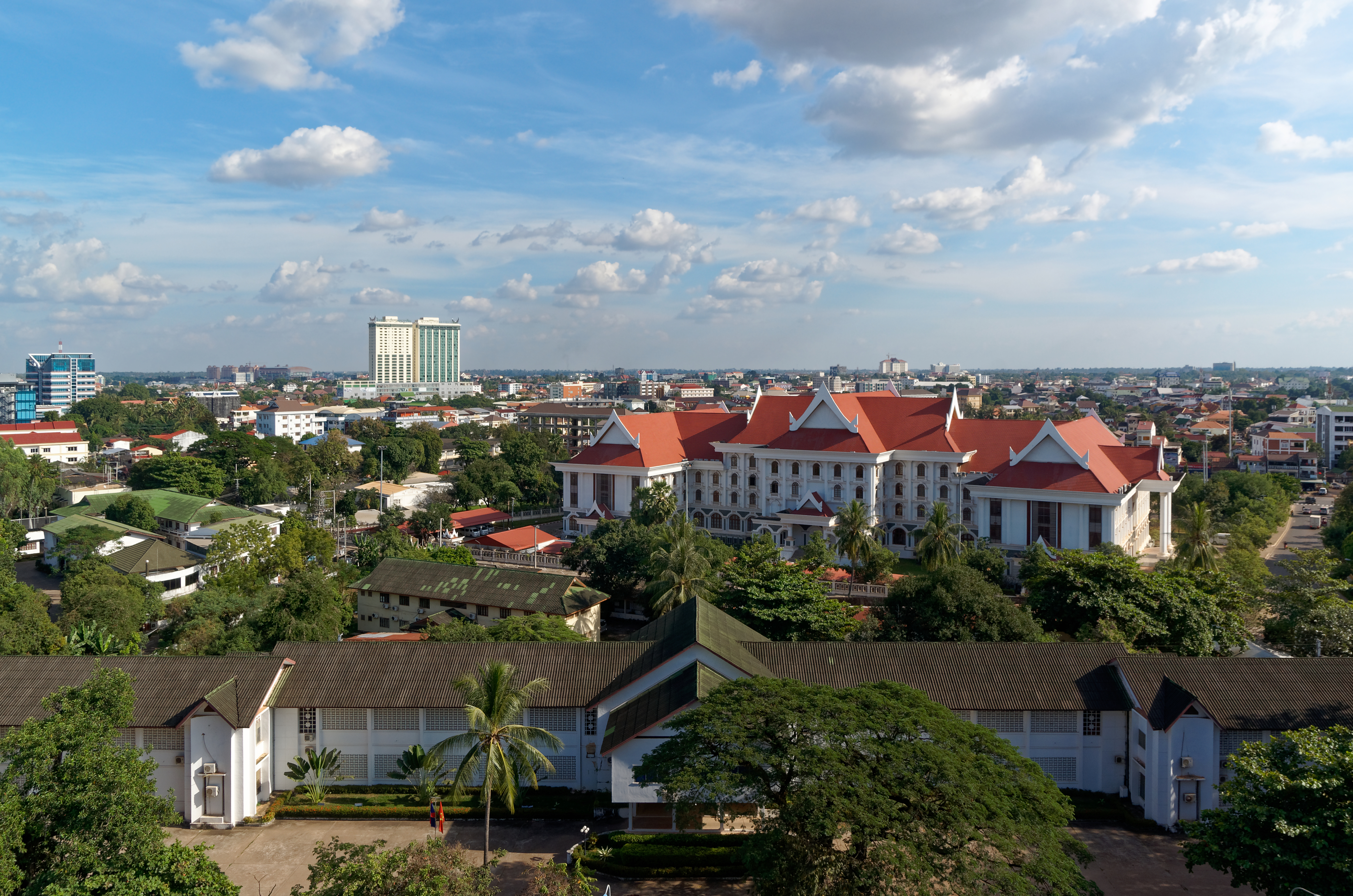
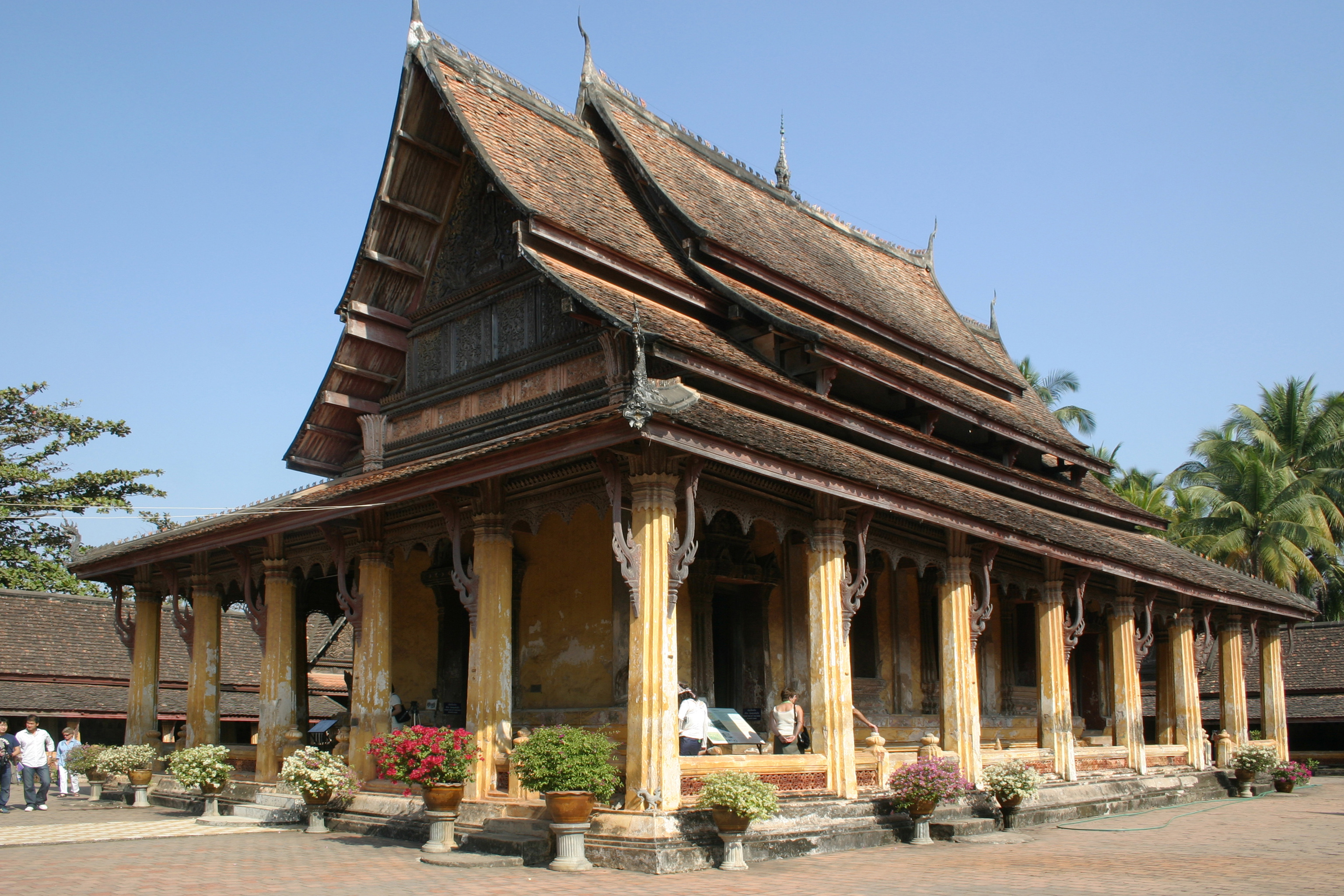
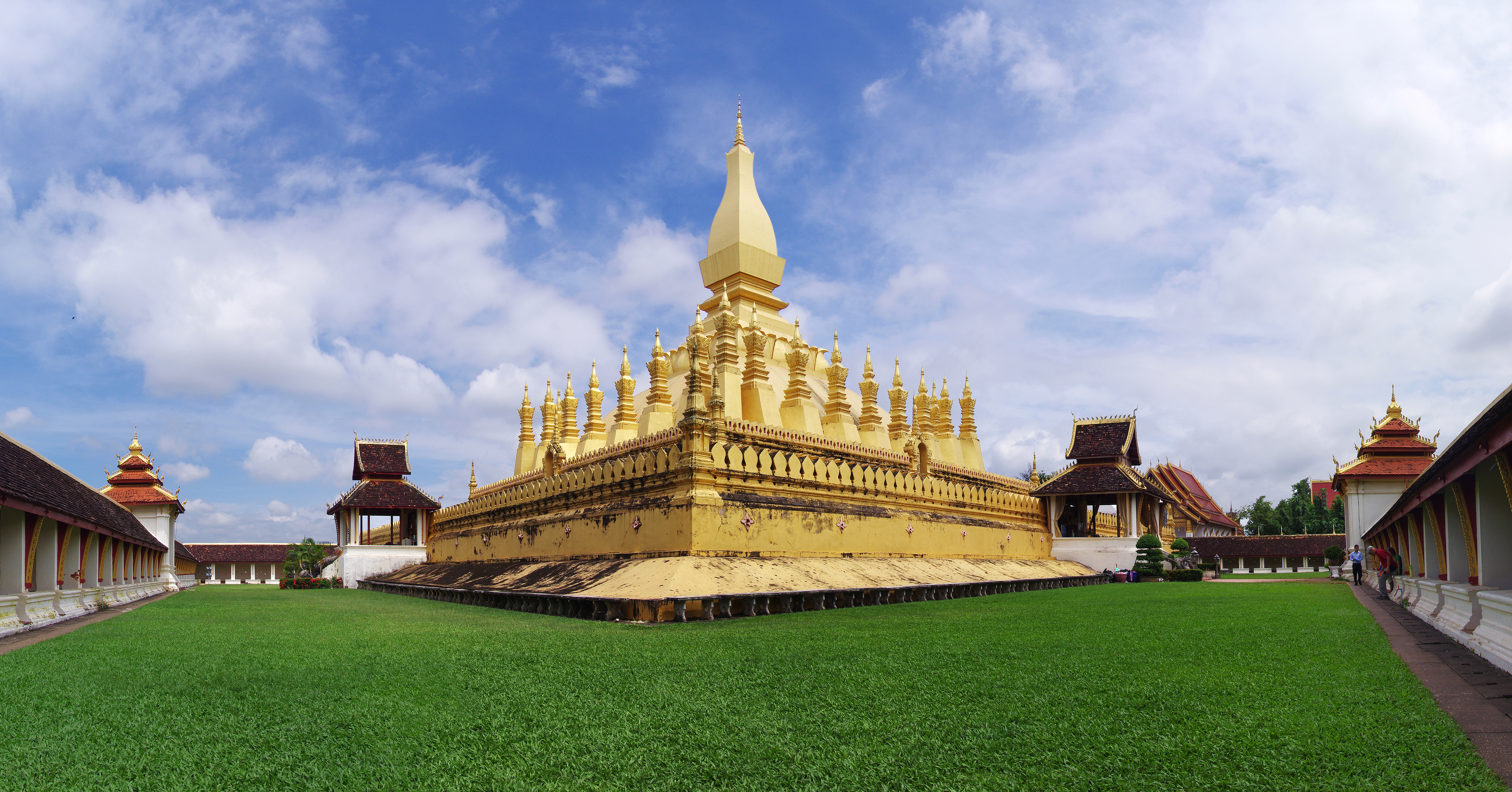
- Patuxai View of Vientiane from the Patuxai Wat Si Saket Pha That Luang

- Location within Laos Location within Asia
- Coordinates: 17.98°N 102.63°E
- Country: Laos
- Prefecture: Vientiane Prefecture
- Settled: 9th century

Government
  - Mayor: Sililaththongsin Thongpheng

Area
  - Total: 3,920 km^{2} (1,510 sq mi)
- Elevation: 174 m (571 ft)

Population (2023)
  - Total: 840,940
  - Rank: 1st
  - Density: 215/km^{2} (556/sq mi)

GDP
  - Total: US$ 3 billion (2022)
  - Per capita: US$3,600 (2022)
- Time zone: UTC+7 (ICT)

Vientiane (Note: Lao: ວຽງຈັນ pronounced [wíaŋ tɕàn]; English: /viˌɛntiˈɑːn/ vee-EN-tee-AHN) is the capital and largest city of Laos. Comprising the 5 urban districts of Vientiane Prefecture, the city is located on the banks of the Mekong, close to the border with Thailand. Vientiane was the administrative capital during French rule. The city had a population of 840,000 as of the 2023 census. Pha That Luang, an icon of Buddhism, is located in Vientiane. Other Buddhist temples can be found there, such as Haw Phra Kaew, which formerly housed the Emerald Buddha.

== Etymology ==
"Vientiane" is the French spelling derived from the Lao Viangchan. The name was previously written "ວຽງຈັນທນ໌" and later sometimes written "ວຽງຈັນ". In Lao, viang (ວຽງ) refers to a 'walled city' with ຈັນ chan of two homonyms:

- one shortened from ຈັນທນ໌ deriving from Sanskrit: चन्दन candana (pronounced [t͡ɕand̪ana]) 'sandalwood' thus translated as the 'walled city of sandalwood'
- another meant 'moon' previously distinguished in writing as "ຈັນທຣ໌" (from Skt. चन्द्र chandra), thus referring to the 'walled city of the moon'.

Other romanisations include "Viangchan" and "Wiangchan".

== History ==
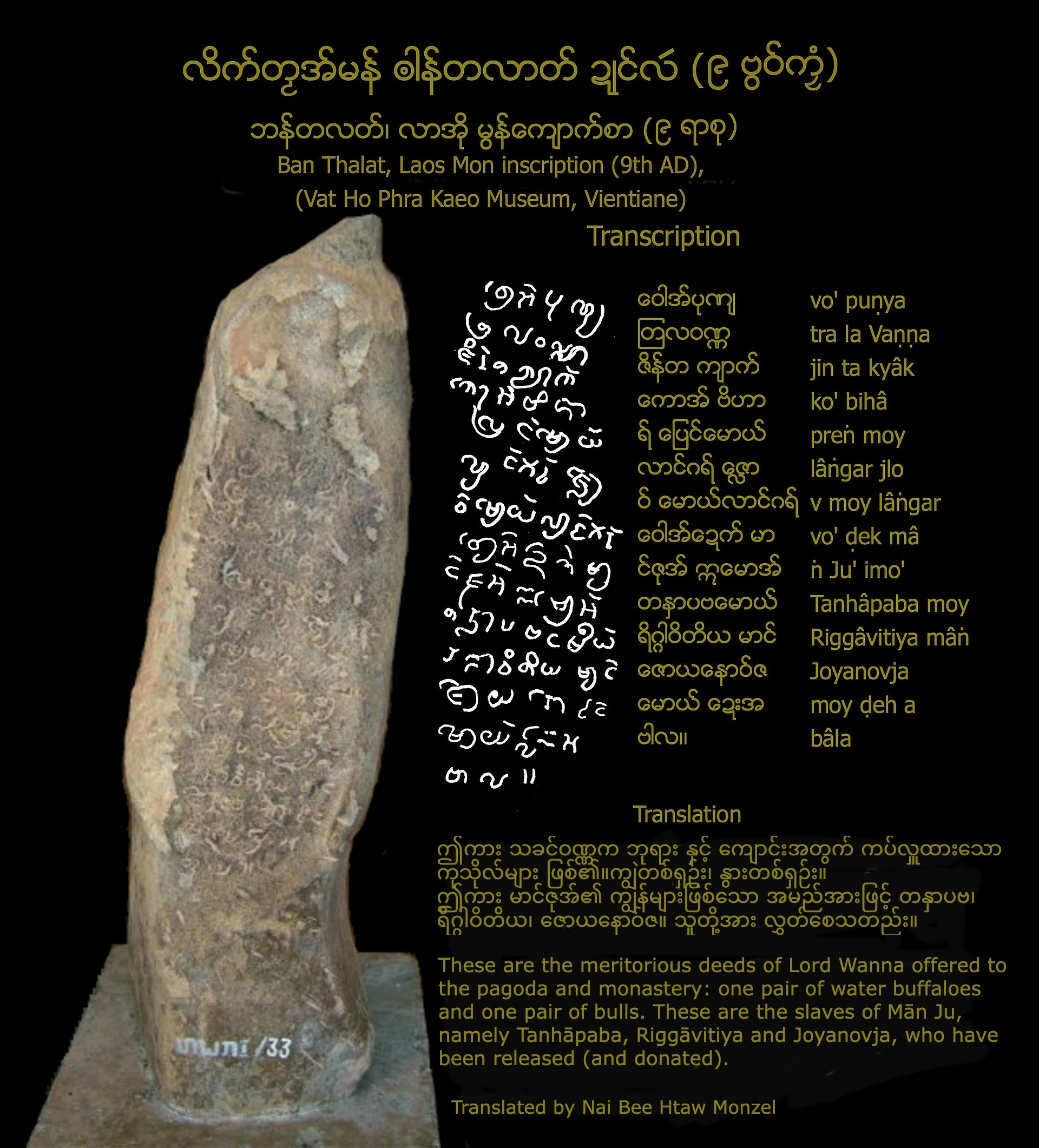
Ban Tha Lat, Mon inscription (9th CE), was found in 1968, in an area where other pieces of archaeological evidence testified to a Mon presence. It was exhibited at Ho Phra Keo Museum, Vientiane, Laos

=== Dvaravati city state kingdoms ===
By the 6th century in the Chao Phraya River Valley, Mon peoples had coalesced to create the Dvaravati kingdoms. In the north, Haripunjaya (Lamphun) emerged as a rival power to the Dvaravati. By the 8th century the Mon had pushed north to create city states, in Fa Daet (what later is Kalasin, northeastern Thailand), Sri Gotapura (Sikhottabong) near Tha Khek, Laos, Muang Sua (Luang Prabang), and Chantaburi (Vientiane). In the 8th century CE, Sri Gotapura (Sikhottabong) was the “strongest of these early city states”, and controlled trade throughout the middle Mekong region. The city states were “loosely bound politically, but were culturally similar” and introduced Therevada Buddhism from Sri Lankan missionaries throughout the region.

=== Transition ===
A reference to the name Vientiane can be seen on a Vietnamese inscription of Duke Đỗ Anh Vũ, dated 1159 during the Khmer-Viet conflict. The inscription says that in 1135, Văn Đan (Vientiane), a vassal of Zhenla (Khmer Empire), invaded Nghe An, and was repelled by the Duke; the Duke led an army chased the invaders as far as Vũ Ôn? (unattested), and then returned with captives.

Decades later, Phraya Chanthaburi (lit. 'King of Chanthaburi'; Vientiane), together with his elder brother Tao Gwa of Mueang Kaew Prakan—a polity sometimes identified with Xiangkhouang (Muang Phuan)—launched a military invasion of the Ngoenyang Kingdom of the Tai Yuan in 1171 CE. The invasion failed as the Ngoenyang ruler Khun Chin sought military assistance from his nephews, the Chueang brothers. After successfully expelling the invaders, the younger Chueang marched eastward, annexed polities, and eventually captured Muang Phuan. He then appointed his middle son, also named Chueang, as ruler of Muang Phuan, and his youngest son, Lao Pao, as ruler of Vientiane.

=== Lan Xang, and French colony ===
In 1354, when Fa Ngum founded the kingdom of Lan Xang, Vientiane became an administrative city. King Setthathirath officially established it as the capital of Lan Xang in 1563, to avoid Burmese invasion.

During French rule, the Vietnamese were encouraged to migrate to Laos, which resulted in 53% of the population of Vientiane being Vietnamese in the year 1943. As late as 1945, the French drew up a plan to move Vietnamese population to 3 areas (i.e. the Vientiane Plain, the Savannakhet region, and the Bolaven Plateau), which was interrupted by the Japanese invasion of Indochina. If this plan had been implemented, according to Martin Stuart-Fox, the Lao might well have lost control over their own country.

During World War II, Vientiane fell and was occupied by Japanese forces. On 9 March 1946, French paratroopers arrived and reoccupied the city on 24 April 1946.

=== Independence ===
After the Laotian Civil War broke out between the Royal Lao Government and the Pathet Lao, in August 1960, Kong Le seized the capital Vientiane and insisted that Souvanna Phouma become prime minister. In December, Phoumi Nosavan then seized the capital, overthrew the Phouma Government, and installed Boun Oum as prime minister. In 1975, Pathet Lao troops moved towards the city and Americans began evacuating the capital. On 23 August 1975, a contingent of 50 Pathet Lao women symbolically liberated the city. On December 2, 1975, the Laotian Civil War was officially declared over, when the monarchy was forced into exile.

== Climate ==
Climate data for Vientiane (1991–2020, extremes 1907–)
Month	Jan	Feb	Mar	Apr	May	Jun	Jul	Aug	Sep	Oct	Nov	Dec	Year
Record high °C (°F)	36.0 (96.8)	38.0 (100.4)	40.2 (104.4)	42.6 (108.7)	42.5 (108.5)	39.5 (103.1)	38.2 (100.8)	37.8 (100.0)	37.5 (99.5)	36.8 (98.2)	36.0 (96.8)	36.0 (96.8)	42.67 (108.81)
Mean daily maximum °C (°F)	29.0 (84.2)	31.0 (87.8)	33.4 (92.1)	34.8 (94.6)	33.6 (92.5)	32.6 (90.7)	31.8 (89.2)	31.4 (88.5)	31.7 (89.1)	31.7 (89.1)	30.8 (87.4)	28.9 (84.0)	31.7 (89.1)
Daily mean °C (°F)	22.9 (73.2)	24.8 (76.6)	27.4 (81.3)	29.1 (84.4)	28.7 (83.7)	28.4 (83.1)	27.9 (82.2)	27.6 (81.7)	27.6 (81.7)	27.2 (81.0)	25.5 (77.9)	22.9 (73.2)	26.7 (80.1)
Mean daily minimum °C (°F)	18.2 (64.8)	19.3 (66.7)	21.7 (71.1)	24.2 (75.6)	25.0 (77.0)	25.4 (77.7)	25.3 (77.5)	25.0 (77.0)	24.6 (76.3)	23.9 (75.0)	21.5 (70.7)	19.2 (66.6)	22.8 (73.0)
Record low °C (°F)	2.4 (36.3)	7.6 (45.7)	11.7 (53.1)	13.8 (56.8)	19.1 (66.4)	20.0 (68.0)	19.5 (67.1)	20.0 (68.0)	18.8 (65.8)	12.9 (55.2)	8.9 (48.0)	5.0 (41.0)	2.4 (36.3)
Average precipitation mm (inches)	7.4 (0.29)	16.8 (0.66)	43.8 (1.72)	89.4 (3.52)	225.6 (8.88)	263.8 (10.39)	299.8 (11.80)	340.8 (13.42)	265.0 (10.43)	87.4 (3.44)	15.4 (0.61)	5.0 (0.20)	1,663.2 (65.48)
Average precipitation days (≥ 1.0 mm)	2	2	5	7	15	18	20	21	17	8	2	1	119
Average relative humidity (%)	70	68	66	69	78	82	82	84	83	78	72	70	75
Mean monthly sunshine hours	221.0	214.7	209.2	213.9	188.8	140.7	116.0	124.3	157.7	209.5	225.3	224.9	2,246
Source 1: World Meteorological Organization, Deutscher Wetterdienst (extremes 1907–1990), Pogoda.ru.net, The Yearbook of Indochina (1939–1940)
Source 2: NOAA (humidity 1961–1990), Extreme Temperature Around The World

== Tourism ==
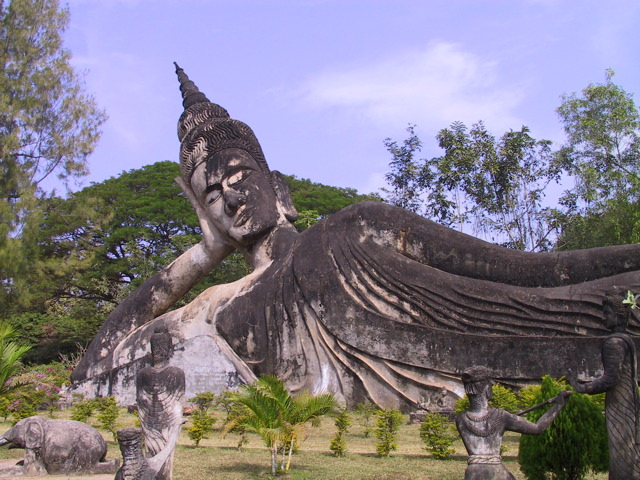
Buddha Park

The capital attracts tourists to its temples and Buddhist monuments. An attraction is Pha That Luang, a national cultural monument of Laos and 1 of its stupas. It was originally built in 1566 by King Setthathirath and was restored in 1953. The golden stupa is 45 metres (148 ft) tall and is believed to contain a relic of the Buddha.

The Wat Si Muang temple was built on the ruins of a Khmer Hindu shrine, the remains of which can be seen behind the ordination hall. It was built in 1563 and is believed to be guarded by the spirit of a local girl, Nang Si. Legend tells that Nang Si, who was pregnant at the time, leapt to her death as a sacrifice, just as the pillar was being lowered into the hole. In front of the temple stands a statue of King Sisavang Vong.

The memorial monument, Patuxai, built between 1957 and 1968, is a landmark in the city.

Buddha Park was built in 1958 by Luang Pu Bunleua Sulilat and contains a collection of Buddhist and Hindu sculptures, scattered amongst gardens and trees. The park is 28 kilometres (17 mi) south of Vientiane at the edge of the Mekong River.

Other sites include:

- Haw Phra Kaew, former temple, later a museum and shops
- Lao National Museum
- Kaysone Phomvihane Museum
- Talat Sao, a morning market
- That Dam, a stupa
- Wat Ong Teu Mahawihan, a Buddhist monastery
- Wat Sri Chomphu Ong Tue, a Buddhist temple
- Wat Si Saket, a Buddhist temple
- Wat Sok Pa Luang, a Buddhist temple
- Settha Palace Hotel, established 1932
- The Sanjiang Market
- Kualao, a restaurant

== Culture ==
=== Media ===
Vientiane is the centre of Laos' national media. It hosts the headquarters of Lao National Television and Lao National Radio. The city is also served by the municipal broadcaster VTE9, as well as CRI Vientiane, a station affiliated with China Radio International.

== Education ==
The National University of Laos is in Vientiane.

International schools include:

- Vientiane International School
- Lycée français international de Vientiane Josué-Hoffet (French)
- Russian Embassy School in Vientiane

== Economy ==
Vientiane has experienced economic growth from foreign investment. In 2011, the stock exchange opened with two listed company stocks, with the cooperation of South Korea. At the end of 2025, the Laos government announced that the economy of the city had grown by an average of 5.34% per year over the last five years, and that industrial and agricultural shares of the economy declined while the service economy gained in its share of the market. As of 2026, the economy continues to grow from aforementioned foreign investment, including the private health sector and the electric vehicle sector. At the beginning of 2026, the Lao government announced an initiative to accrue roughly US$30,000,000 in sought investments to drive the city's economic growth.

== Transportation ==
=== Bus ===
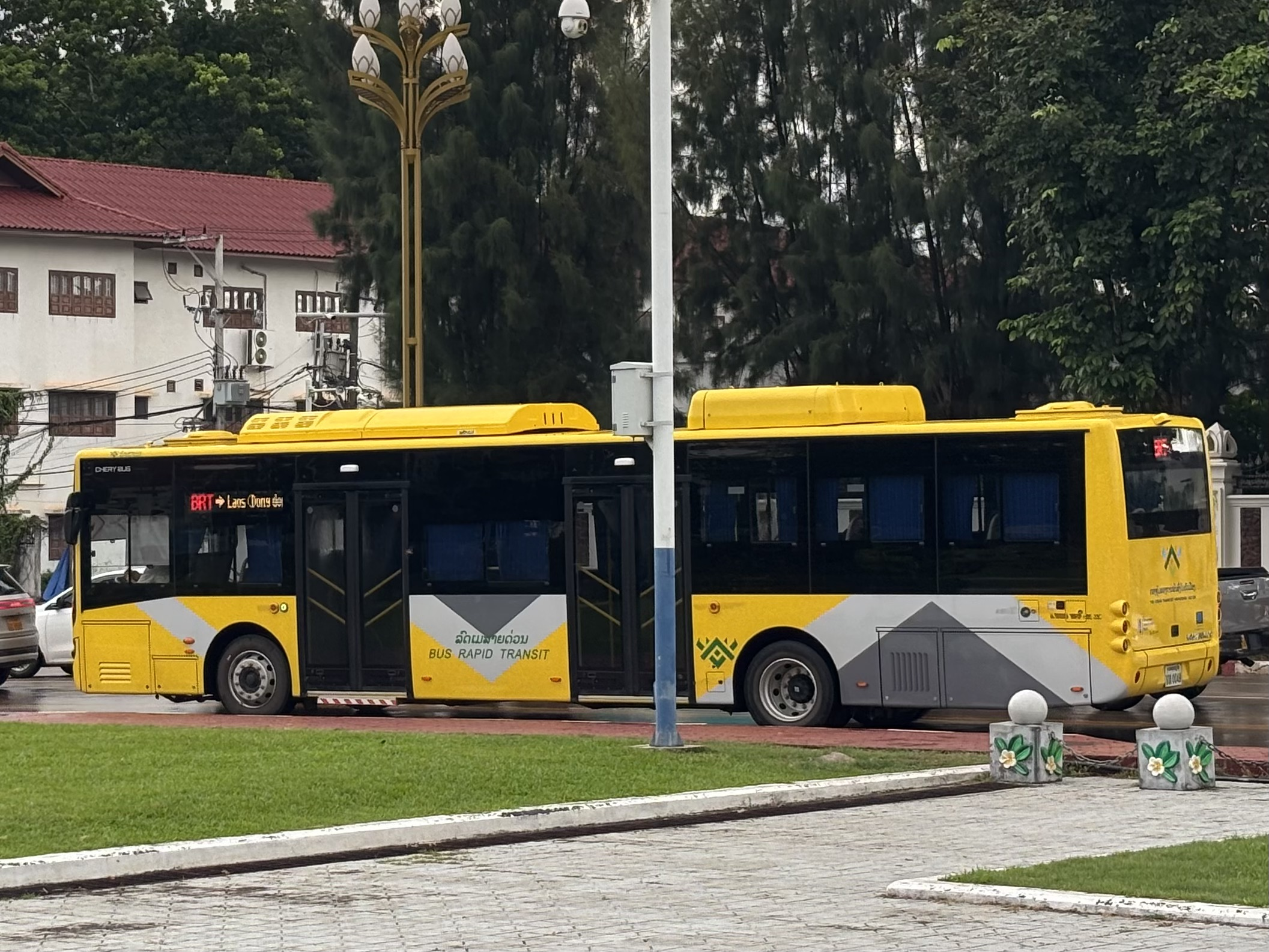
Vientiane eBRT Bus

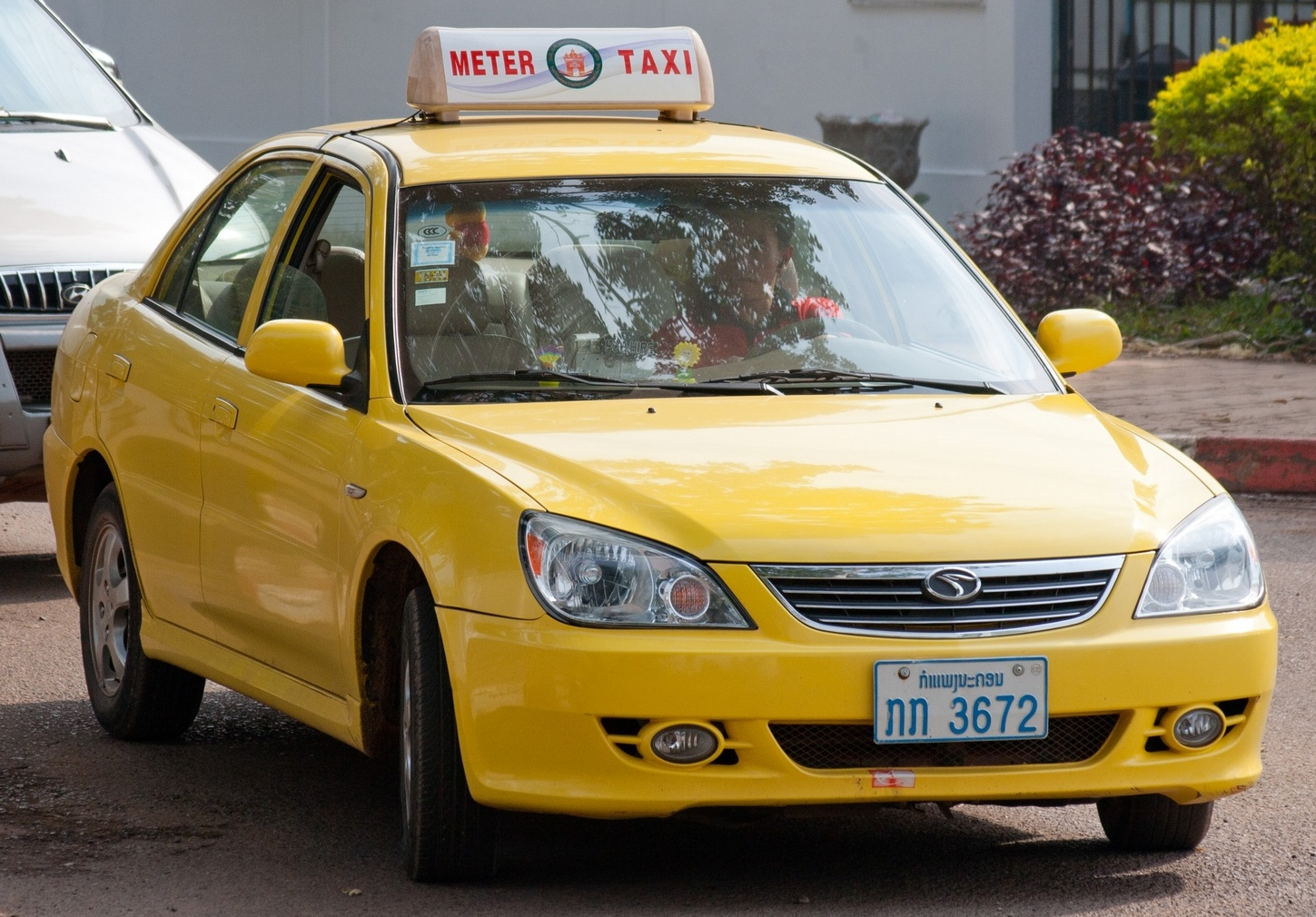
Older taxis in Vientiane are being replaced by newer Chinese-made cars, like this Soueast Lioncel.

There are regular bus services connecting Vientiane Bus Station with the rest of the country. In Vientiane, regular bus services around the city are provided by Vientiane Capital State Bus Enterprise.

Vientiane constructed its first bus rapid transit (BRT) service in 2024 under the Vientiane Urban Transport Project (VSUTP) of Laos' Ministry of Public Works and Transport. There will be three BRT lines with a total route length of 13.9 km within the capital area. The construction of the BRT was 90% completed in the end of July 2025 and it was scheduled for free trial operation in August 2025, with a total of 55 buses manufactured in China by Chery Wanda; it was then delayed to September 2025. The BRT service officially opened for free trial from 10 March to 9 May 2026; normal fare operation was due to start on 10 May.

Shortly after the opening of the BRT free trial, the Laos government planned to expand the BRT to Wattay International Airport and China-Laos Vientiane Railway Station in the future. To mitigate the sudden fuel price surge and fuel shortage caused by the 2026 Middle-East conflict, it is planned to increase the use of electric vehicles in Laos.

=== Rail ===
Vientiane railway station

A metre gauge railway link over the first bridge was formally inaugurated on 5 March 2009, previously ending at Thanaleng Railway Station, in Dongphosy village (Vientiane Prefecture), 20 km east of Vientiane. As of November 2010, Lao officials plan to convert the station into a cargo rail terminal for freight trains, allowing cargo to be transported from Bangkok into Laos more cheaply than via road.

The Boten–Vientiane railway (sometimes referred to as the China–Laos railway or Laos–China railway) is a 414 kilometres (257 mi) 1,435 mm (4 ft 8 1/2 in) standard gauge electrified railway in Laos, running between the capital Vientiane and the town of Boten on the border with China. The line was officially opened on 3 December 2021. In early 2026 the Lao National Assembly approved the first phase of a 562 km standard-gauge railway which will link Vientiane with the Vung Ang deepwater port on Vietnam's coast, providing landlocked Laos direct access to a major port. The project is part of the government's 2026-2030 National Socio-Economic Development Plan.

=== Air ===
Wattay International Airport

Vientiane is served by Wattay International Airport with international connections to other Asian destinations such as Singapore, Hong Kong, Malaysia, Thailand, South Korea, Japan and China. Lao Airlines has regular flights to domestic destinations in the country (including flights daily to Luang Prabang, plus flights weekly to other local destinations).

== Healthcare ==
The "Centre Medical de l'Ambassade de France" is available to the foreign community in Laos. The Mahosot Hospital is a local hospital in treating and researching diseases and is connected with the University of Oxford. In 2011 the Alliance Clinic opened near the airport, with a connection to Thai hospitals. The Setthathirat International Clinic has foreign doctors. A free, 24/7 ambulance service is provided by Vientiane Rescue, a volunteer-run rescue service established in 2010.

== Twin towns – sister cities ==
Vientiane is twinned with:

- Beijing, China
- Elgin, United States
- Ho Chi Minh City, Vietnam
- Huế, Vietnam
- Kunming, China

== See also ==
- 1987 Vientiane bombing
- Auguste Pavie
- Kingdom of Vientiane
- National Library of Laos
- Vat Yotkeo
