= General Charles Ashley =

English musician

General Charles Ashley (c. 1770 – 21 August 1818) was an English musician.

== Life ==
Ashley was the eldest son of John Ashley, who obtained some celebrity as a violinist, and a brother of Richard Ashley, Charles Jane Ashley, and John James Ashley. He was a pupil of Giardini and Barthelemon, and with his three brothers took part in the Handel Commemoration in 1784, on which occasion the young musicians distinguished themselves by nailing the coat of an Italian violinist to his seat and filling his violin with halfpence, following which he complained so loudly that George III sent to the orchestra to find out what occasioned the disturbance.

General Charles Ashley led his father's orchestra at the Covent Garden oratorios, of which, after John Ashley's death, he became Joint manager with his brother Charles Jane. He became a member of the Royal Society of Musicians on 3 April 1791. On 2 March 1804 he married a Miss Chandler, and, having no family and an independent fortune, shortly afterwards retired from his profession. He died at King's Row, Pimlico, on 21 August 1818.
