= Mahosot Hospital =

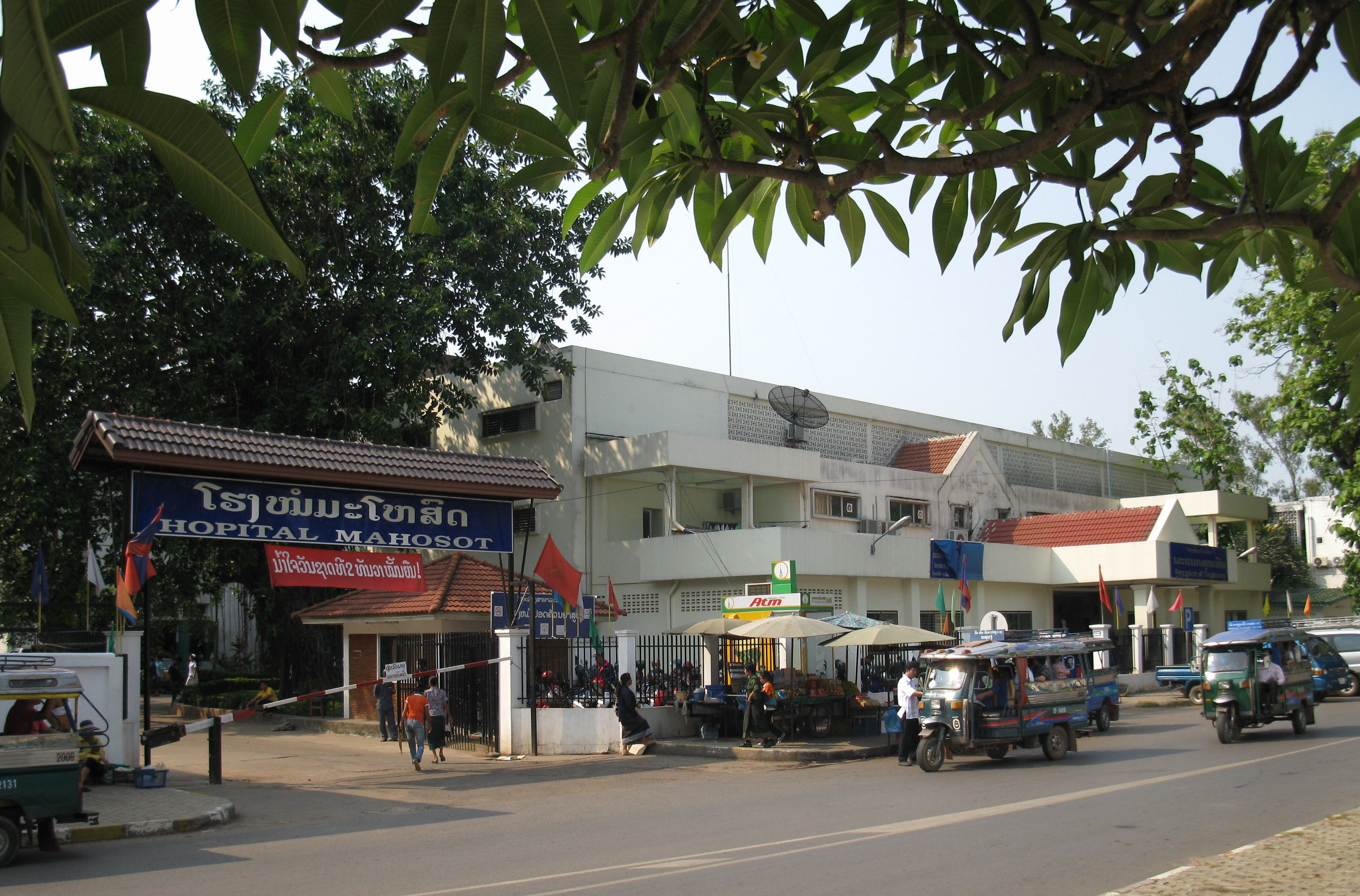

Geography
- Location: Vientiane, Laos
- Coordinates: 17.9599°N 102.6121°E

History
- Opened: 1903

Links
- Lists: Hospitals in Laos

Mahosot Hospital is a hospital on Quai Fa Ngum, Vientiane, Laos. It was established in 1903.

The hospital specializes diagnosis and treatment of infectious diseases and also serves as an important medical research and training centre. The country has a relatively low life expectancy at just 68 years, and diseases such as typhus, typhoid, malaria and bacteraemia are important.

Since 2000 the hospital has included the Lao-Oxford-Mahosot Hospital-Wellcome Trust Research Unit. This is funded by the Wellcome Trust in collaboration with the University of Oxford. The Infectious Diseases Centre in the hospital consists of two floors: a patient ward on the ground floor with rooms varying on degree of isolation, a laboratory and research area and offices and conference rooms on the upper floor.
