= Malaria Journal =

- Discipline: Malaria
- Language: English
- Edited by: Marcel Hommel

Publication details
- History: 2002-present
- Publisher: BioMed Central
- Open access: Yes
- License: Creative Commons Attribution License 4.0
- Impact factor: 3.109 (2014)

Standard abbreviations
- ISO 4: Malar. J.

Indexing
- CODEN: MJAOAZ
- ISSN: 1475-2875
- OCLC no.: 891213153

Links
- Journal homepage; Online access

The Malaria Journal is a peer-reviewed open access medical journal published by BioMed Central. It was established in 2002 and covers research on malaria and related topics. The editor-in-chief is Marcel Hommel (University of Liverpool).

== Abstracting and indexing ==
The journal is abstracted and indexed in:

- CAB International
- Chemical Abstracts Service
- Current Contents/Clinical Medicine
- Embase
- Global Health
- MEDLINE/PubMed
- Science Citation Index
- Scopus
- Zoological Record

According to the Journal Citation Reports, the journal has a 2014 impact factor of 2.80.
