= Sir Edmund Lacon, 2nd Baronet =

Sir Edmund Knowles Lacon, 2nd Baronet (28 February 1780 – 3 June 1839) of Ormesby House (later called Ormesby Hall, part demolished in the 1960s), Ormesby St Margaret, Norfolk, was an English Mayor of Great Yarmouth, High Sheriff of Norfolk and Member of Parliament.

He was the only son of Sir Edmund Lacon, 1st Baronet of Ormesby House and educated at Gilpin's School in Cheam, Eton College (1793) and Emmanuel College, Cambridge 1797–1801 before entering Lincoln's Inn in 1799 to study law. He succeeded his father in 1820.

He was elected Mayor of Great Yarmouth for 1807 and Member of Parliament for Great Yarmouth in 1812, sitting until 1818. He was picked High Sheriff of Norfolk for 1823–24.

He married in 1804 Eliza Dixon, the daughter and coheiress of Thomas Beecroft of Saxthorpe Hall, Norfolk and had 3 sons and 3 daughters. He was succeeded by Sir Edmund Lacon, 3rd Baronet.

== Arms ==
Coat of arms of Sir Edmund Lacon, 2nd Baronet
Crest A mount Vert thereon a falcon Proper beaked and belled Or charged on the breast with a cross flory and gorged with a collar Gules. Escutcheon Quarterly per fess indented Erminois and Azure in the second quarter a wolf’s head erased Or. Motto Probitas Verus Honos

Parliament of the United Kingdom
Preceded by Edward Harbord; Giffin Wilson	Member of Parliament for Great Yarmouth; 1801–1814; With: William Loftus	Succeeded by Hon. Thomas Anson; Charles Rumbold
Baronetage of the United Kingdom
Preceded by Edmund Lacon	Baronet (of Great Yarmouth); 1826–1839	Succeeded by Edmund Lacon
