= 2015 North Norfolk District Council election =

English local election

← 2011	7 May 2015	2019 →

All 48 seats to North Norfolk District Council 25 seats needed for a majority

	First party	Second party
Party	Conservative	Liberal Democrats
Last election	28 seats	18 seats
Seats before	28	18
Seats won	33	15
Seat change	▲5	▼3
Popular vote	30,813	23,568
Percentage	38.5%	29.4%
Swing	▲7.1%	▼7.5%
	Third party	Fourth party
Party	UKIP	Independent
Last election	1 seat	1 seat
Seats won	0	0
Seat change	▼1	▼1
Popular vote	4,935	730
Percentage	8.4%	1.2%
Swing	▲1.3%	▼1.0%
- Results of the 2015 North Norfolk District Council election
Council control before election
Conservative
Council control after election
Conservative

The 2015 North Norfolk District Council election took place on 7 May 2015 to elect members of the North Norfolk District Council in England. It was held on the same day as other local elections.

== Election result ==
2015 North Norfolk District Council election
Party	Seats	Gains	Losses	Net gain/loss	Seats %	Votes %	Votes	+/−
Conservative	33	8	3	▲5	68.8	38.2	22,541	+7.1
Liberal Democrats	15	3	6	▼3	31.3	27.9	16,446	-7.5
Labour	0	0	0	Steady	0.0	14.9	8,773	-2.6
Green	0	0	0	Steady	0.0	9.5	5,582	+2.7
UKIP	0	0	1	▼1	0.0	8.4	4,935	+1.3
Independent	0	0	1	▼1	0.0	1.2	730	-1.0

== Ward results ==
=== Astley ===
Astley Ward (1 Councillor)
Party	Candidate	Votes	%	±%
Conservative	Steven David Ward**	734	56.0	+16.4
Green	Sharon Suzanne Harvey	344	26.2	+11.4
Labour	Catherine Plewman	233	17.8	+0.6
Majority		390	29.8	
Turnout		1,326	72.42	
Conservative hold		Swing		

Steven Ward was an incumbent councillor in Lancaster South ward.

=== Briston ===
Briston Ward (1 Councillor)
Party	Candidate	Votes	%	±%
Conservative	Jennifer English	557	41.0	+8.9
Liberal Democrats	John Andrew Wyatt*	342	25.2	−8.0
UKIP	Jonathan Hancock	245	18.1	+5.7
Labour	Ann Poberefsky	132	9.7	−7.8
Green	Thomas Andrew Silvano Robinson	81	6.0	+1.2
Majority		215	15.8	
Turnout		1,366	68.92	
Conservative gain from Liberal Democrats		Swing		

=== Chaucer ===
Chaucer Ward (1 Councillor)
Party	Candidate	Votes	%	±%
Conservative	Michael William Robert Knowles	520	35.7	+4.4
Liberal Democrats	Jacqueline Ann Howe	441	30.3	−9.6
UKIP	Terence Comber	267	18.4	+5.9
Labour	Craig Lawrence Roters	117	8.0	−2.8
Green	Mark Aquila Benjamin Taylor	110	7.6	+2.1
Majority		79	5.4	
Turnout		1,469	76.63	
Conservative gain from Liberal Democrats		Swing		

=== Corpusty ===
Corpusty Ward (1 Councillor)
Party	Candidate	Votes	%	±%
Conservative	Georgina Jane Clinton Perry-Warnes	556	37.3	−5.1
UKIP	David Ramsthotham	324	21.8	−9.2
Labour	Aubrey Poberefsky	309	20.8	+9.9
Liberal Democrats	Felix Michael Brueggemann	184	12.4	+2.8
Green	Bruce Coppard	116	7.8	+1.7
Majority		232	15.5	
Turnout		1,497	77.65	
Conservative hold		Swing		

=== Cromer Town ===
Cromer Town Ward (2 Councillors)
Party	Candidate	Votes	%	±%
Liberal Democrats	Andreas Yiasimi*	854	45.3	+18.1
Conservative	Hilary Cox	747	39.6	+4.3
Conservative	Thomas Benjamin Cabbell Manners*	511	27.1	−10.7
Liberal Democrats	Heinrich Peter Butikofer	510	27.0	+3.9
Labour	Jennifer Hamilton-Emery	336	17.8	−6.8
Labour	David Phillip-Pritchard	252	13.4	−7.8
Green	Rupert Sandino Erie	183	9.7	−1.7
Majority		236	12.5	
Turnout		1,887	65.19	
Liberal Democrats gain from Conservative		Swing		
Conservative hold		Swing		

=== Erpingham ===
Erpingham Ward (1 Councillor)
Party	Candidate	Votes	%	±%
Conservative	Norman Robert Smith*	678	45.0	+2.9
Liberal Democrats	Arthur John Bernard Bailey	356	23.6	−9.0
Green	Peter Joseph Wedge	266	17.7	+6.2
Labour	Tony Steven Chambers	207	13.7	−0.1
Majority		322	21.4	
Turnout		1,519	77.03	
Conservative hold		Swing		

=== Gaunt ===
Gaunt Ward (1 Councillor)
Party	Candidate	Votes	%	±%
Conservative	Nicholas Timothy Coppack	467	31.1	N/A
Liberal Democrats	John Crampsie	464	30.9	−38.4
Independent	Graham Robert Jones*	310	20.6	−48.7
Labour	Christine Diana Collins	173	11.5	−4.9
Green	Peter Alan Crouch	89	5.9	−8.4
Majority		3	0.2	
Turnout		1,516	76.22	
Conservative gain from Liberal Democrats		Swing		

Graham Jones had previously been elected as a Liberal Democrat councillor.

=== Glaven Valley ===
Glaven Valley Ward (1 Councillor)
Party	Candidate	Votes	%	±%
Liberal Democrats	Andrew Christopher Wells	634	46.9	+23.6
Conservative	Colin Vincent Frank Walker	438	32.4	−17.9
UKIP	Irene Ramsbotham	148	11.0	+2.6
Labour	Martyn George Morgan Sloman	78	5.8	−3.8
Green	Rupert Graham Hillard Rosser	53	3.9	−4.6
Majority		196	14.5	
Turnout		1,359	76.09	
Liberal Democrats gain from Conservative		Swing		

=== Happisburgh ===
Happisburgh Ward (1 Councillor)
Party	Candidate	Votes	%	±%
Liberal Democrats	Lee Walker*	631	42.7	−36.9
Conservative	Pauline Patricia Mary Porter	569	38.5	N/A
Labour	Christopher James Frederick Hamilton-Emery	158	10.7	−9.7
Green	Alicia Jane Hull	119	8.1	N/A
Majority		62	4.2	
Turnout		1,495	72.29	
Liberal Democrats hold		Swing		

=== High Heath ===
High Heath Ward (1 Councillor)
Party	Candidate	Votes	%	±%
Liberal Democrats	David Alan Young*	472	39.4	−28.9
Conservative	Jason Philip Law	453	37.8	N/A
Green	Andrew John Ian Worsdale	162	13.5	−5.2
Labour	Graham Smithers	110	9.2	−3.8
Majority		19	1.6	
Turnout		1,216	78.71	
Liberal Democrats hold		Swing		

=== Holt ===
Holt Ward (2 Councillors)
Party	Candidate	Votes	%	±%
Liberal Democrats	Philip Wesley High*	1,016	46.5	−4.4
Conservative	Margaret Elizabeth Ann Prior	886	40.5	N/A
UKIP	Duncan Baker	714	32.6	−26.2
Labour	Jonathon James Read	429	19.6	+4.9
Liberal Democrats	Barbara Ena Young	295	13.5	−2.7
Green	Jane Bowden Worsdale	182	8.3	+1.3
Labour	Thomas Nicholas Shirley	140	6.4	+0.6
Majority		172	7.9	
Turnout		2,187	72.96	
Liberal Democrats hold		Swing		
Conservative gain from UKIP		Swing		

=== Hoveton ===
Hoveton Ward (1 Councillor)
Party	Candidate	Votes	%	±%
Conservative	Nigel David Dixon*	791	60.9	+1.2
Liberal Democrats	Philip Gordon Livesey	224	17.3	−5.9
Labour	Carol-Mary Fraser	184	14.2	−2.9
Green	Matthew Charles Pennington	99	7.6	N/A
Majority		567	43.6	
Turnout		1,313	71.75	
Conservative hold		Swing		

=== Lancaster North ===
Lancaster North Ward (2 Councillors)
Party	Candidate	Votes	%	±%
Conservative	Ann Margaret Claussen-Reynolds*	836	47.0	+10.4
Conservative	Michael Roy Reynolds*	787	44.3	+8.0
Labour	Janet Holdom	609	34.3	+22.0
Labour	Adrian Robin Vertigan	547	30.8	+13.8
Green	Julia Elizabeth Sandford-Cooke	280	15.8	N/A
Majority		178	10.0	
Turnout		1,777	62.84	
Conservative hold		Swing		
Conservative hold		Swing		

=== Lancaster South ===
Lancaster South Ward (2 Councillors)
Party	Candidate	Votes	%	±%
Conservative	Jeremy Nicholas Punchard*	847	43.9	+2.2
Conservative	John Victor Rest	668	34.6	−2.0
UKIP	Jack Smith	474	24.5	N/A
Labour	Richard Gordon Crook	423	21.9	+1.1
Labour	Emma Juliet Smith	396	20.5	+2.7
Liberal Democrats	Gloria Margaret Diane Lisher	279	14.4	−12.3
Green	Barbara Ann Wyvill	150	7.8	−2.9
Majority		194	10.1	
Turnout		1,931	59.09	
Conservative hold		Swing		
Conservative hold		Swing		

=== Mundesley ===
Mundesley Ward (2 Councillors)
Party	Candidate	Votes	%	±%
Conservative	Wyndham James Northam*	931	40.1	−15.0
Conservative	Barry Smith*	829	35.7	−7.8
Independent	Paul Clive Blencowe	420	18.1	N/A
Liberal Democrats	Mary Seward	415	17.9	−17.4
Liberal Democrats	William Alan Fryer	387	16.7	−3.1
Labour	Philip Arthur Keddell	316	13.6	+1.3
Labour	Nicholas Robin Dyball	266	11.5	−0.6
Green	Jacquelyne Anne MacDonald	237	10.2	+1.8
Majority		409	17.6	
Turnout		2,319	69.96	
Conservative hold		Swing		
Conservative hold		Swing		

=== North Walsham East ===
North Walsham East Ward (2 Councillors)
Party	Candidate	Votes	%	±%
Liberal Democrats	Peter William Moore*	785	35.7	−21.3
Liberal Democrats	Vivienne Frances Uprichard*	705	32.1	−14.7
Conservative	Fiona Elizabeth Turner	488	22.2	N/A
UKIP	Lynette Comber	401	18.3	N/A
Conservative	Fernando Jorge Santos Reis	393	17.9	N/A
UKIP	Geoffrey Wilson	344	15.7	N/A
Labour	Alison Jane Tipler	278	12.7	−13.8
Green	Paul Malcolm Oakes	224	10.2	−3.4
Labour	Jann Visconti	184	8.4	−15.1
Green	Anne Marie Abbs	180	8.2	N/A
Majority		217	9.9	
Turnout		2,197	65.51	
Liberal Democrats hold		Swing		
Liberal Democrats hold		Swing		

=== North Walsham North ===
North Walsham North Ward (2 Councillors)
Party	Candidate	Votes	%	±%
Liberal Democrats	Eric George Seward*	911	45.7	−6.4
Liberal Democrats	Nigel Paul Lloyd*	886	44.5	−11.6
Conservative	Madeleine Barbara Ashcroft	433	21.7	N/A
Conservative	Janet May Farrow	401	20.1	N/A
Labour	Barry Charles Hester	326	16.4	−7.7
Labour	Raymond William Clifton	245	12.3	−6.4
Green	Joanne Todd	227	11.4	−2.9
Majority		453	22.8	
Turnout		1,993	63.00	
Liberal Democrats hold		Swing		
Liberal Democrats hold		Swing		

=== North Walsham West ===
North Walsham West Ward (2 Councillors)
Party	Candidate	Votes	%	±%
Liberal Democrats	Virginia Ruth Gay*	738	33.3	−26.7
Liberal Democrats	Ann Margaret Moore*	683	30.8	−24.2
Conservative	Sarah Eliza Thompson	507	22.8	N/A
UKIP	John Fleming	457	20.6	N/A
Labour	Stephen Bernard Burke	446	20.1	−4.0
Labour	David Gregory Spencer	440	19.8	−8.6
Conservative	Luke Daniel Tweedie	392	17.7	N/A
Green	Elizabeth Miranda McKenna	145	6.5	N/A
Majority		176	8.0	
Turnout		2,219	66.14	
Liberal Democrats hold		Swing		
Liberal Democrats hold		Swing		

=== Poppyland ===
Poppyland Ward (1 Councillor)
Party	Candidate	Votes	%	±%
Conservative	Angela Margaret Fitch-Tillett*	786	52.8	−1.3
Liberal Democrats	Edward Robert Maxfield	343	23.0	N/A
Labour	Timothy John Bartlett	205	13.8	−4.7
Green	Jayne Helen Lynette Ivimey	155	10.4	−1.8
Majority		443	29.8	
Turnout		1,523	74.47	
Conservative hold		Swing		

=== Priory ===
Priory Ward (2 Councillors)
Party	Candidate	Votes	%	±%
Conservative	Vincent William Fitzpatrick	800	35.7	−6.3
Conservative	Simon Alistair Hester	791	35.3	N/A
Liberal Democrats	Gareth Burnell	692	30.9	+2.0
Liberal Democrats	Stephen Francis Alexander Pask	679	30.3	+17.2
Labour	Catherine Gates	379	16.9	+4.1
Labour	Michael Anthony Gates	356	15.9	+0.9
Green	Patricia Margaret Janey Sugden	186	8.3	+1.0
Green	Isabel Maclean Tipple	140	6.3	N/A
Majority		99	4.4	
Turnout		2,240	70.82	
Conservative hold		Swing		
Conservative gain from Independent		Swing		

=== Roughton ===
Roughton Ward (1 Councillor)
Party	Candidate	Votes	%	±%
Conservative	Susan Anne Arnold*	678	49.2	+1.5
Liberal Democrats	Folik Miah Choudhury	360	26.1	−2.2
Labour	David Edwin Russell	194	14.1	−0.1
Green	James William Spiller	147	10.7	+0.9
Majority		318	23.1	
Turnout		1,402	72.23	
Conservative hold		Swing		

=== St Benet ===
St. Benet Ward (1 Councillor)
Party	Candidate	Votes	%	±%
Liberal Democrats	Barbara Alexandra McGoun*	715	50.5	−19.1
Conservative	Alexander Rollo Tristram Oliver	482	34.0	N/A
Labour	Clive William Sellick	129	9.1	−6.1
Green	Stephen Andrew Fairbrass	91	6.4	N/A
Majority		233	16.5	
Turnout		1,428	78.20	
Liberal Democrats hold		Swing		

=== Scottow ===
Scottow Ward (1 Councillor)
Party	Candidate	Votes	%	±%
Conservative	Simon Durrant Shaw	582	42.2	−1.0
Liberal Democrats	Richard James Sims	480	34.8	−5.1
Labour	Marcia Elizabeth Staines	218	15.8	−1.1
Green	Ingrid Emma Dodd	100	7.2	N/A
Majority		1,387	68.29	
Turnout		102	7.4	
Conservative hold		Swing		

=== Sheringham North ===
Sheringham North Ward (2 Councillors)
Party	Candidate	Votes	%	±%
Liberal Democrats	Brian John Hannah*	738	39.6	−12.3
Conservative	Douglas Frederick Smith	650	34.9	+9.6
Liberal Democrats	Penelope Jean Bevan Jones	522	28.0	−1.1
Conservative	David Anthony Ward	518	27.8	N/A
Labour	Noel Christopher Gant	323	17.3	−4.6
Labour	Callum Edward Ringer	246	13.2	+2.1
Green	Alistair Kilmuir Cormack	187	10.0	+1.0
Green	Martin Langsdon	173	9.3	N/A
Majority		128	6.9	
Turnout		1,865	67.04	
Liberal Democrats hold		Swing		
Conservative gain from Liberal Democrats		Swing		

=== Sheringham South ===
Sheringham South Ward (2 Councillors)
Party	Candidate	Votes	%	±%
Conservative	Richard Christopher Shepherd*	966	41.0	+2.6
Conservative	Judith Britannia Caroline Oliver*	852	36.2	+1.8
Liberal Democrats	Julie Louise Chalmers	735	31.2	+1.6
Liberal Democrats	Rebecca Mary Fish	717	30.4	+6.1
UKIP	Graham McEvoy	378	16.1	+4.7
Labour	William Francis O'Connor	220	9.3	−9.5
Green	Rosemary Margaret Anne Glen	170	7.2	+2.0
Labour	Renalto Visconti	157	6.7	−11.6
Green	Michael John Yarham	119	5.1	N/A
Majority		117	5.0	
Turnout		2,355	74.11	
Conservative hold		Swing		
Conservative hold		Swing		

=== Stalham & Sutton ===
Stalham & Sutton Ward (2 Councillors)
Party	Candidate	Votes	%	±%
Liberal Democrats	Pauline Millicent Grove-Jones*	841	36.1	−4.1
Conservative	Robert Douglas Mark Stevens*	826	35.5	+1.3
Liberal Democrats	Marion Janet Millership	710	30.5	+1.3
Conservative	Alistair James Mackay	678	29.1	N/A
Labour	Sheila Ann Cullingham	488	20.9	−9.8
Labour	Ruth Evelyn Smith	283	12.1	−6.8
Green	Lesley Betty Ash	210	9.0	N/A
Majority		116	5.0	
Turnout		2,330	68.66	
Liberal Democrats hold		Swing		
Conservative hold		Swing		

=== Suffield Park ===
Suffield Park Ward (2 Councillors)
Party	Candidate	Votes	%	±%
Conservative	John Henry Auburn Lee*	821	35.7	−3.4
Conservative	Nigel Glenn Pearce	607	26.4	−21.4
Liberal Democrats	Neale Grearson	525	22.8	+6.7
UKIP	Robert Hipkiss	495	21.5	+11.4
Liberal Democrats	Samuel Lidgley	491	21.3	+9.2
Labour	Timothy Robert Geoffrey Adams	432	18.8	−5.7
Labour	Philip Alan Harris	417	18.1	−4.2
Green	Lynne Janine Beshir	178	7.7	−0.6
Green	Julian Arthur Drury	146	6.3	N/A
Majority		82	3.6	
Turnout		2,301	69.62	
Conservative hold		Swing		
Conservative hold		Swing		

=== The Raynhams ===
The Raynhams Ward (1 Councillor)
Party	Candidate	Votes	%	±%
Conservative	Rebecca Lee Palmer*	727	58.0	+12.5
Labour	Mark James Wright	288	23.0	+0.4
Green	Jennifer Margaret Outred	239	19.1	N/A
Majority		439	35.0	
Turnout		1,289	64.10	
Conservative hold		Swing		

=== The Runtons ===
The Runtons Ward (1 Councillor)
Party	Candidate	Votes	%	±%
Liberal Democrats	Sarah Elizabeth Jane Butikofer	575	42.4	+25.7
Conservative	William John Clovis Meath Baker	554	40.9	−26.4
Labour	Ruth Bartlett	128	9.4	−1.4
Green	Timothy Francis Dale Snelling	98	7.2	+2.0
Majority		21	1.5	
Turnout		1,369	77.13	
Liberal Democrats gain from Conservative		Swing		

=== Walsingham ===
Walsingham Ward (1 Councillor)
Party	Candidate	Votes	%	±%
Conservative	Thomas Joseph Fitzpatrick*	687	54.9	+9.7
UKIP	Keith Loads	244	19.5	N/A
Labour	Pamela Margaret Cowburn	216	17.3	+0.3
Green	Jenny May Fairbrass	105	8.4	N/A
Majority		443	35.4	
Turnout		1,263	69.05	
Conservative hold		Swing		

=== Waterside ===
Waterside Ward (2 Councillors)
Party	Candidate	Votes	%	±%
Conservative	Paul Kenneth Rice	882	34.6	+5.1
Conservative	Benjamin Joseph Francis Jarvis*	845	33.2	−8.1
Liberal Democrats	Paul Howard Williams*	538	21.1	−19.0
Liberal Democrats	Eric Clive Stockton	537	21.1	N/A
UKIP	Jeffrey Parkes	505	19.8	+2.8
UKIP	Barry Whitehouse	393	15.4	N/A
Labour	Elaine Addison	210	8.2	−8.4
Labour	Nicola Jane O’Connor	160	6.3	−5.4
Green	Anne Patricia Filgate	158	6.2	N/A
Green	Michael Graham Macartney-Filgate	142	5.6	N/A
Majority		307	12.0	
Turnout		2,547	71.95	
Conservative hold		Swing		
Conservative gain from Liberal Democrats		Swing		

=== Waxham ===
Waxham Ward (1 Councillor)
Party	Candidate	Votes	%	±%
Conservative	Richard Carey Price*	525	39.7	−7.4
Liberal Democrats	Amanda Jane Anderson	467	35.3	N/A
Green	Philip James Mole	172	13.0	−6.2
Labour	Paul David Dark	159	12.0	−21.6
Majority		58	4.4	
Turnout		1,341	74.29	
Conservative hold		Swing		

=== Wensum ===
Wensum Ward (1 Councillor)
Party	Candidate	Votes	%	±%
Conservative	Ann Rosemary Green*	540	40.8	−7.9
UKIP	Allan Pink	283	21.4	N/A
Liberal Democrats	Hugh Christopher Lanham	216	16.3	−9.4
Labour	Terry Cotton	145	11.0	−4.8
Green	Richard John Ives	139	10.5	+0.7
Majority		257	19.4	
Turnout		1,335	71.54	
Conservative hold		Swing		

=== Worstead ===
Worstead Ward (1 Councillor)
Party	Candidate	Votes	%	±%
Conservative	Harold Glyn Williams*	597	41.8	−4.9
Liberal Democrats	Jacqueline Ruth Belson	475	33.3	−13.4
Green	Tina Roberts	180	12.6	+4.2
Labour	Jasper William Haywood	175	12.3	−3.7
Majority		122	8.5	
Turnout		1,444	74.17	
Conservative gain from Liberal Democrats		Swing		

Glyn Williams had previously been elected as a Liberal Democrat councillor.

== By-Elections ==
Astley By-Election 14 July 2016
Party	Candidate	Votes	%	±%
Liberal Democrats	Heinrich Butikofer	309	40.8	N/A
Conservative	Joanne Copplestone	198	25.3	−30.7
UKIP	David Ramsbotham	133	17.0	N/A
Green	Amanda Huntridge	81	10.4	−15.8
Labour	Callum Ringer	51	6.5	−11.3
Majority		121	15.5	
Turnout		773	42.80	
Liberal Democrats gain from Conservative		Swing		

Glaven Valley By-Election 29 September 2016
Party	Candidate	Votes	%	±%
Liberal Democrats	Karen Ward	429	55.3	+8.4
Conservative	Andrew Livsey	281	36.2	+3.8
UKIP	John Dymond	32	4.1	−6.9
Labour	Stephen Burke	23	3.0	−2.8
Green	Alicia Hull	11	1.4	−2.5
Majority		148	19.0	+4.6
Turnout		778	44.7	
Liberal Democrats hold		Swing		

Waterside By-Election 9 February 2017
Party	Candidate	Votes	%	±%
Liberal Democrats	Marion Millership	649	55.1	+34.0
Conservative	Anthony Lumbard	410	34.8	+1.6
UKIP	Barry Whitehouse	77	6.5	−8.9
Labour	David Russell	41	3.5	−4.7
Majority		239	20.3	
Turnout		1177	33.2	
Liberal Democrats gain from Conservative		Swing		

Holt By-Election 4 May 2017
Party	Candidate	Votes	%	±%
Conservative	Duncan Baker	724	50.1	+17.5
Liberal Democrats	Naomi Farrow	546	37.8	−8.7
Labour	Richard Kelham	90	6.2	−13.4
UKIP	Terence Comber	84	5.8	−26.8
Majority		178	12.3	
Turnout		1,444		
Conservative gain from Liberal Democrats		Swing		

Worstead By-Election 15 February 2018
Party	Candidate	Votes	%	±%
Liberal Democrats	Saul Penfold	509	72.7	+39.4
Conservative	Robin Russell-Pavier	118	16.9	−24.9
Labour	David Spencer	73	10.4	−1.9
Majority		391	55.9	
Turnout		700		
Liberal Democrats gain from Conservative		Swing		
