= Joseph Sandars (MP) =

British politician (1821-1893)

Member of Parliament for Great Yarmouth
- In office 8 July 1848 – 8 July 1852 Serving with Charles Rumbold
- Preceded by: Arthur Lennox; Octavius Coope
- Succeeded by: Edmund Lacon; Charles Rumbold

Personal details
- Born: 1821
- Died: 14 March 1893 (aged 71–72)
- Party: Conservative
- Spouse: Lady Virginia Taylour (m. 1850)
- Parents: Joseph Sandars (father); Anna McKenzie Richards (mother)

Joseph Sandars (1821 – 14 March 1893) was a British Conservative politician.

Son of Joseph Sandars and Anna McKenzie Richards. After unsuccessfully contesting Devonport at the 1847 general election, Sandars became Conservative Member of Parliament (MP) for Great Yarmouth at a by-election in 1848—caused by the 1847 general election result being declared void due to bribery. He then held the seat until 1852 when he unsuccessfully sought election as a Peelite at Bewdley.

Parliament of the United Kingdom
Preceded by Arthur Lennox; Octavius Coope	Member of Parliament for Great Yarmouth; 1848–1852; With: Charles Rumbold	Succeeded by Edmund Lacon; Charles Rumbold
