= 1930 North Norfolk by-election =

UK Parliamentary by-election

The 1930 North Norfolk by-election was held on 9 July 1930. The by-election was held due to the elevation to the peerage of the incumbent Labour MP, Noel Buxton. It was held for the Labour Party by his wife, Lucy Noel-Buxton.

== Background ==
Noel Buxton had been Liberal Party MP for the seat until he was very narrowly defeated in 1918. After switching to Labour he regained it in 1922. At the last general election, he held the seat with a majority of 1,883 votes over the second place Conservative. During his time as MP Noel Buxton served as Minister of Agriculture in the First MacDonald ministry in 1924, and was reappointed to that position at the start of the Second MacDonald ministry.

== Result ==
By-election, 9 July 1930: North Norfolk
Party	Candidate	Votes	%	±%
Labour	Lucy Noel-Buxton	14,821	50.3	+2.8
Conservative	Thomas Cook	14,642	49.7	+8.4
Majority		179	0.6	−5.6
Turnout		29,463	75.0	−2.9
Registered electors		39,272		
Labour hold		Swing	−2.8	

Unlike the previous two general elections, there was no Liberal candidate in this by-election, resulting in a contest that was a straight fight between Labour and the Conservatives. Lady Noel-Buxton's narrow victory would prove to be relatively short-lived. Cook challenged her again in the next year's general election, and this time easily defeated her, winning a majority of just under 7,000 votes. The two would face off again in 1935, and Cook would again emerge the victor, albeit with a smaller majority.
