= Lacon baronets =

Baronetcy in the Baronetage of the United Kingdom

The Lacon Baronetcy, of Great Yarmouth in the County of Norfolk, is a title in the Baronetage of the United Kingdom. It was created on 11 December 1818 for Edmund Lacon. The second Baronet was High Sheriff of Norfolk. The third Baronet sat as Conservative Member of Parliament for Great Yarmouth and Norfolk North. The family seat has been Ormesby House in Ormesby St Michael.

== Lacon baronets, of Great Yarmouth (1818) ==
- Sir Edmund Lacon, Kt., 1st Baronet (died 1826)
- Sir Edmund Knowles Lacon, 2nd Baronet (1780–1839)
- Sir Edmund Henry Knowles Lacon, 3rd Baronet (1807–1888)
- Sir Edmund Broughton Knowles Lacon, 4th Baronet (1842–1899)
- Sir Edmund Beecroft Heathcote Lacon, 5th Baronet (1878–1911)
- Sir George Haworth Ussher Lacon, DSO, 6th Baronet (1881–1950)
- Sir George Vere Francis Lacon, 7th Baronet (1909–1980)
- Sir Edmund Vere Lacon, 8th Baronet (1936–2014)
- Sir (Edmund) Richard Vere Lacon, 9th Baronet (born 1967)

The heir apparent to the baronetcy is Luke Edmund Lacon (born 2001), only son of the 9th Baronet.

== Arms ==
Coat of arms of Lacon baronets
| Crest A mount Vert thereon a falcon Proper beaked and belled Or charged on the breast with a cross flory and gorged with a collar Gules. Escutcheon Quarterly per fess indented Erminois and Azure in the second quarter a wolf’s head erased Or. Motto Probitas Verus Honos |

Baronetage of the United Kingdom
| Preceded by Lechmere baronets | Lacon baronets of Great Yarmouth; 11 December 1818 | Succeeded by Shelley-Sidney baronets |
