= James Duff (North Norfolk MP) =

British Army officer and politician

Colonel James Duff (1831 – 22 December 1878) was a British Army officer and Conservative Party politician from Westwick in Norfolk.

== Early life ==
Duff was born on 21 July 1831 in Elgin, Morayshire, Scotland. He was the son of James Duff and his wife Charlotte, eldest daughter of Sir George Beeston Prescott. His grandfather was Major-General Sir James Duff.

Duff was educated at Rugby and entered the army as an ensign in 1851.

== Career ==
He served with the 23rd Royal Welsh Fusiliers in the Crimean War, including the Siege of Sebastopol, and was taken prisoner in the Battle of Inkerman. He retired from the army in 1858 as a major, having received the Crimea Medal with two clasps, and became a Justice of the Peace (JP) in Norfolk.

He was elected as a Member of Parliament (MP) for North Norfolk at a by-election in April 1876, after the death of Frederick Walpole MP, and held the seat until his death less than three years later. In Parliament, Duff spoke on military matters, and was active in getting the Norfolk and Suffolk Fisheries Act 1877 through Parliament.

== Personal life ==
In 1859, Duff married Mary Laura Dawkins, daughter of Edward Dawkins. Together, they were the parents of:

- Mildred Blanche Duff (1860–1932)
- Beatrice Duff (1861–1863)
- Lilian Selina Amy Duff (1862–1910)
- Lt.-Col. Bernard James Petre (1867–1934), who married Hon. Ruby Thellusson, daughter of Frederick Thellusson, 5th Baron Rendlesham and Lady Egida Montgomerie, in 1907.
- Granville John Berney Duff (1869–1936), who married, firstly, Rangiamohia Te Herekiekie, a descendant of Tūwharetoa i te Aupōuri, in 1899. After her death in 1908, he married Lilian Mary (née Petrie) Bulwer, widow of William Dering Earle Bulwer and daughter of William Witon Petrie, in 1922.
- Catherine Basilia Duff (1877–1951)

He died in office in December 1878, aged 47, at his London residence in Upper Brook Street.

Parliament of the United Kingdom
Preceded by Frederick Walpole; Sir Edmund Lacon, Bt	Member of Parliament for North Norfolk; 1876 – 1878; With: Sir Edmund Lacon, Bt	Succeeded by Edward Birkbeck; Sir Edmund Lacon, Bt
