= Virginia Sandars =

Irish author

Lady Virginia Sandars
- Born: Lady Virginia Frances Zerlina Taylour; 17 March 1828; Headford, County Meath
- Died: 26 January 1922 (aged 93); London
- Spouse: Joseph Sandars (m. 1850; died 1893)
- Parents: Thomas Taylour, 2nd Marquess of Headfort (father); Olivia Stevenson (mother)

Lady Virginia Frances Zerlina Sandars R.H.A. (17 March 1828 – 26 January 1922), was an Irish author.

== Biography ==
Virginia Frances Zerlina Taylour was born on 17 March 1828 at Headford, County Meath to Olivia Stevenson and Thomas Taylour, 2nd Marquess of Headfort. She was one of nine children; her mother died in 1834 of cholera. She grew up in Headfort House in County Meath. She married Joseph Sandars on 16 July 1850 at Parish Church of Kells, County Kerry, Ireland. He was from at Henley-on-Thames, Oxfordshire where he held the office of Member of Parliament for Yarmouth between 1848 and 1852. Irish miniature painter, Elish Lamont, produced a miniature of Sandars for her in 1858.

Sandars was a well-regarded author with several books and short stories written. She was also a contributor to literary magazines and journals. She sent ‘A Story of the People’s Palace’ to Belgravia which was founded in 1866 by Mary Elizabeth Braddon. Sandars was part of the management board of a company founded to protect women and women workers in the West-end fashion industry, Madame Devey’s Company. She attended a Conservative Primrose League meeting in 1887 on Lord Salisbury’s Irish policy. She died on 26 January 1922 at age 93 in Walton Street, London.

== Bibliography ==
Novels

- The Heiress of Haredale, London: F. V. White, 1886.
- The Duke of Melton, 1887
- A Bitter Repentance, London: Hurst and Blackett, 1888.
- A Life's Devotion, London: Hurst and Blackett, 1891.

Stories

- A Story of Cowes Regatta, The Argosy, 1886
- Love’s Absolution: or an episode of London’s Life, The Woman’s World, 1888
- A dangerous crossing, The Argosy, 1884
- Aunt and niece, The Argosy, 1889
- Mrs. Rashleigh’s Mistake, The Argosy, 1898
- The Siren: An Episode of Cowes Regetta, The Argosy, 1886
