= George Anson (British Army officer, born 1797) =

British Army general

Major-General The Honourable George Anson CB
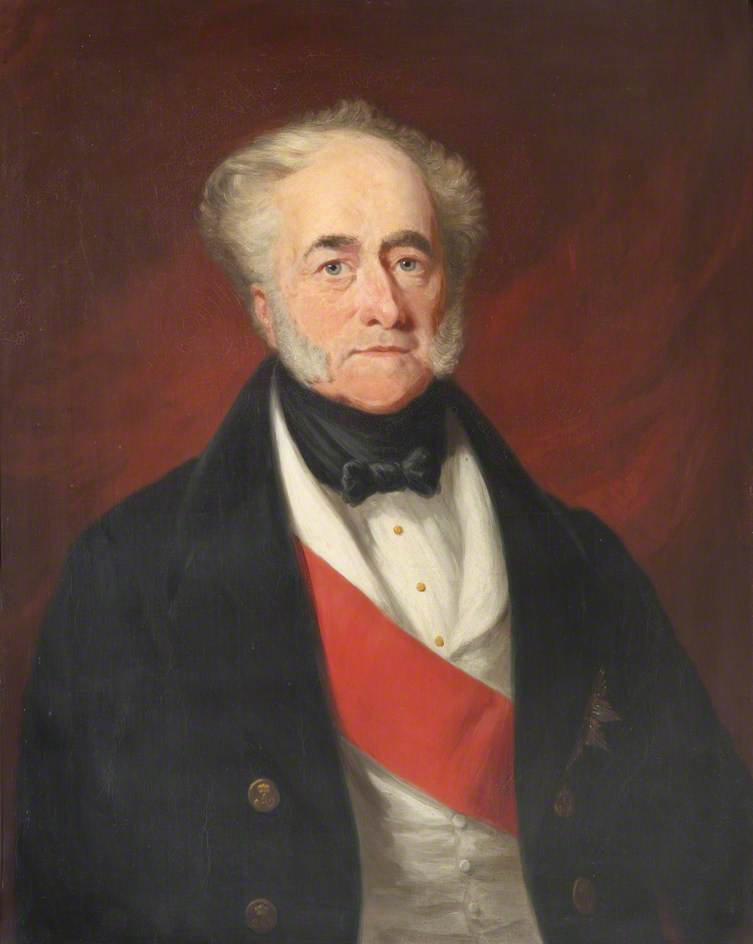
- Born: 13 October 1797
- Died: 27 May 1857 (aged 59); Karnal, India
- Burial place: Kensal Green Cemetery, England
- Education: Eton College
- Spouse: Isabella Weld-Forester (m. 1830–1857)
- Children: 3
- Relatives: Thomas Anson, 1st Viscount Anson (father); Thomas Anson, 1st Earl of Lichfield (brother); Geraldine Hervey, Marchioness of Bristol (daughter)
- Military career
- Allegiance: United Kingdom
- Branch: British Army
- Service years: 1814–1857
- Rank: Major-General
- Commands: Madras Army; Commander-in-Chief, India
- Conflicts: Napoleonic Wars; Battle of Waterloo; Indian Mutiny; Siege of Delhi

Major-General George Anson CB (13 October 1797 – 27 May 1857) was a British military officer and Whig politician from the Anson family.

== Early life ==
Anson was the second son of Thomas Anson, 1st Viscount Anson, and his wife Lady Anne Margaret Coke, daughter of Thomas Coke, 1st Earl of Leicester of Holkham Hall, Norfolk. Thomas Anson, 1st Earl of Lichfield was his elder brother.

He was educated at Eton College.

== Military and political career ==
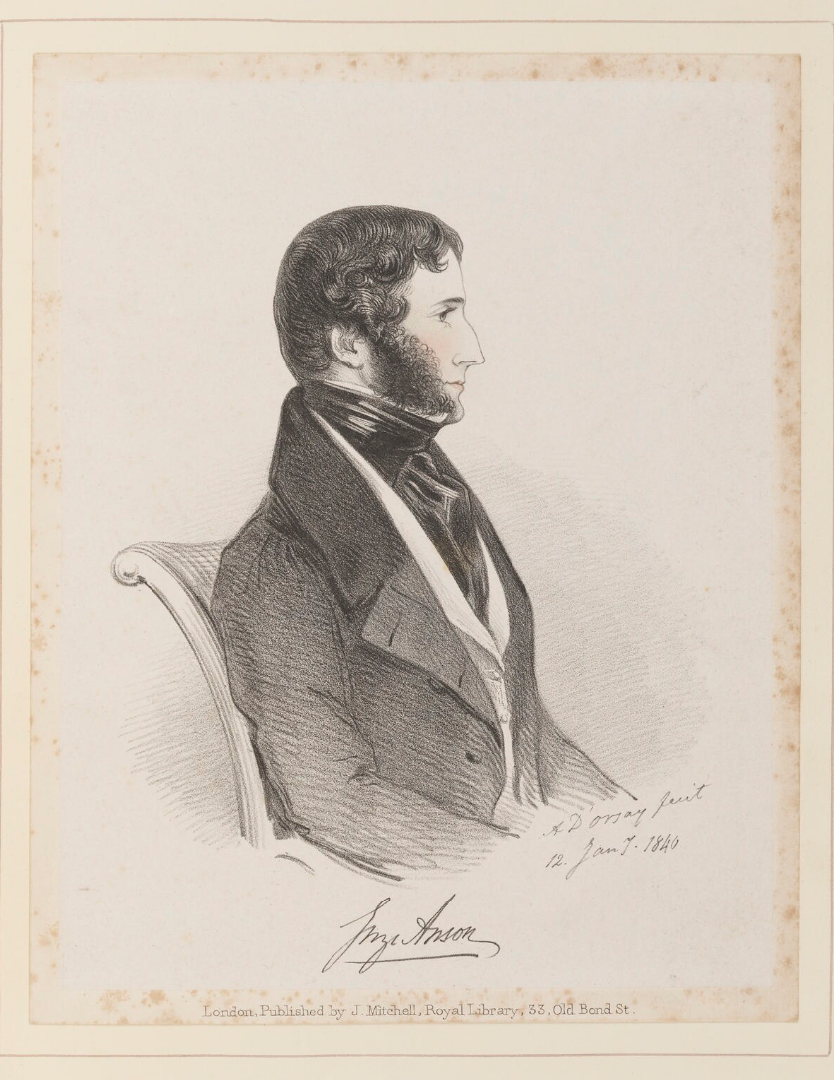
Anson in 1840

Anson entered the Army in 1814 as an ensign in the 3rd (Scots Fusiliers) Guards and served at an early age in the Napoleonic Wars and fought at the Battle of Waterloo. He later sat as a Member of Parliament (MP) for Great Yarmouth from 1818 to 1835, for Stoke-upon-Trent from 1836 to 1837, and for Staffordshire South from 1837 to 1853 and served as Storekeeper of the Ordnance under Lord Melbourne from 1835 to 1841 and as Clerk of the Ordnance under Melbourne in 1841 and under Lord John Russell from 1846 to 1852.

== Indian appointment ==
In 1853 Anson was promoted to the rank of major-general. The following year he was appointed to the command of the Madras Army in 1854, and early in 1856 became Commander-in-Chief in India. He was colonel of the 55th (Westmorland) Regiment of Foot from 12 December 1856. Since Anson's prior military career consisted of a few months' active service as a subaltern in the Guards (admittedly including Waterloo), a decade on home service in London while also sitting in Parliament as an MP, and 26 and a half years on half-pay, these appointments caused disgruntled comment in some quarters and were presented as an example of "Horse Guards Patronage" at its worst. His decision to accept the Madras appointment caused surprise in English political and social circles, where he was noted mainly for his gentlemanly ways, his good looks and attractive wife, and his skill at cards.

== In India ==
During his short period as Commander-in-Chief in India Anson caused resentment by showing bias against the East India Company's army and its sepoys. He appointed all of his aides-de-camp from the Queen's Army, from which he had come. He was quoted as stating that he could never see a sepoy sentry "without turning away in disgust at his unsoldierlike appearance". The Governor-General Lord Canning commented that Anson "was rather a disappointment - but that it would be very difficult to quarrel with anyone so imperturbably good tempered, and so thoroughly a gentleman".

Anson's appointment as C-in-C coincided with the beginning of the period of tension and disaffection leading up to the outbreak of the Indian Rebellion of 1857. On 23 March 1857 Anson told a parade of Indian officers of the Bengal Army that rumors that the government would interfere with their religious beliefs and caste were completely false. He called on the officers to satisfy the sepoys under their command that this was the case. Anson himself reported a week later that the greased cartridge issue was simply a pretext for protest, adding that "the sepoys have been pampered - and have grown insolent beyond bearing". He did however order the postponement of target practice at musketry depots; which would have involved the actual biting of cartridges and was accordingly the immediate cause of distrust amongst the soldiers. While Anson appears to have realised the seriousness of the situation and to have ordered an analysis of the cartridge wrappings in question, he left the training centre at Ambala without taking more decisive action. "Redress and inquiry were both inconvenient so the headquarters' camp marched to Simla" commented the British Instructor of Musketry, left at the depot in the midst of swirling discontent amongst the sepoys there.

On 12 May Anson and his staff were at Simla when the news of the outbreak of the mutiny at Meerut and Delhi reached him. He immediately ordered that European troops take possession of the various arsenals in the Punjab but delayed his own departure for the centre of rebellion while logistical problems were resolved. Anson finally left Ambala for Delhi on 23 May at the head of three regiments of British troops and some sepoy units that he considered reliable. His intention was to join with the Meerut Brigade and press on to retake Delhi. However, Anson died of cholera four days into the march, at the age of 59. He was buried in Kurnaul (now Karnal). His body was later exhumed and taken back to England to be buried in Kensal Green cemetery.

== Character ==
In spite of his personal charm Anson did not enjoy much professional respect amongst his fellow officers in Bengal. A staff colonel commented immediately after his sudden death that the sepoys had "a great hatred for him, honestly thinking that he was commissioned to convert them". A more valid criticism was that his immediate response to the outbreak of the mutiny was a laborious one, at a moment when quick and energetic action could still have been decisive.

== Private life ==
Anson married The Hon. Isabella Elizabeth Annabella Weld-Forester, daughter of Cecil Weld-Forester, 1st Baron Forester, and wife Lady Katherine Mary Manners, in 1830. They had three daughters: the first was Isabella Maria Katherine Curzon-Howe, Countess Curzon, the second was Alice Louisa, The Hon. Mrs. Wentworth-Fitzwilliam and the third Geraldine Georgiana Mary Hervey, Marchioness of Bristol, Isabella survived her husband by only a year and died in December 1858.

Anson was a prominent owner of racehorses: he won The Derby with Attila in 1842 and The Oaks two years later with The Princess.

== Other ==
It has been asserted mistakenly that 'Famous British Olympian Sir Matthew Pinsent is George's great-great-great-grandson', but in fact that was a different George Anson - the uncle of the subject of this article. The portrait above also appears to be of his Uncle.

== See also ==
- 1835 Wolverhampton riot

Parliament of the United Kingdom
Preceded by Thomas Anson; Charles Rumbold	Member of Parliament for Great Yarmouth; 1818–1835; With: Charles Rumbold	Succeeded by Thomas Baring; Winthrop Mackworth Praed
Preceded by Richard Edensor Heathcote; John Davenport	Member of Parliament for Stoke-upon-Trent; 1836 – 1837; With: John Davenport	Succeeded by William Taylor Copeland; John Davenport
Preceded by Sir John Wrottesley; Sir Francis Holyoake-Goodricke	Member of Parliament for Staffordshire South; 1837–1853; With: Viscount Ingestre 1837–1849; Viscount Lewisham 1849–1853	Succeeded by Viscount Lewisham; Edward Littleton
Military offices
Preceded by Francis Robert Bonham	Storekeeper of the Ordnance; 1835–1841	Succeeded by James Hanway Plumridge
Preceded by James Whitley Deans Dundas	Clerk of the Ordnance; 1841	Succeeded by Henry George Boldero
Preceded by Lord Arthur Lennox	Clerk of the Ordnance; 1846–1852	Succeeded by Francis Plunkett Dunne
Preceded by William Staveley	C-in-C, Madras Army; 1854–1856	Succeeded by Sir Patrick Grant
Preceded by Sir William Gomm	Commander-in-Chief, India; 1856	Succeeded by Sir Patrick Grant
