= 1876 North Norfolk by-election =

UK Parliamentary by-election

The 1876 North Norfolk by-election was fought on 21 April 1876. The by-election was fought due to the death of the incumbent Conservative MP, Frederick Walpole. It was won by the Conservative candidate James Duff.
