= Lucy Noel-Buxton, Baroness Noel-Buxton =

British politician (1888–1960)

The Right Honourable The Lady Noel-Buxton
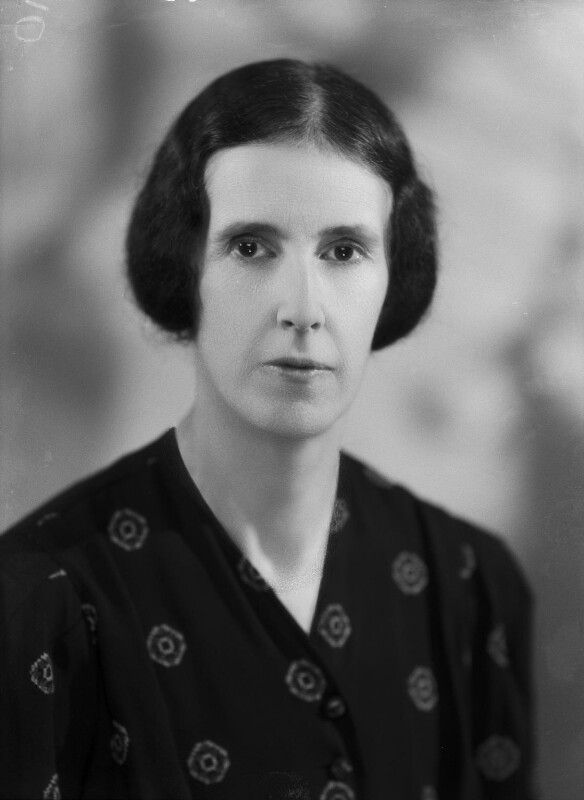

Member of Parliament for Norwich with John Paton
- In office 5 July 1945 – 22 February 1950
- Prime Minister: Clement Attlee
- Preceded by: Henry Strauss and Geoffrey Hithersay Shakespeare
- Succeeded by: Constituency abolished

Member of Parliament for North Norfolk
- In office 9 July 1930 – 26 October 1931
- Preceded by: Noel Buxton
- Succeeded by: Sir Thomas Cook

Personal details
- Born: Lucy Edith Pelham Burn; 14 December 1888 Winchester, Hampshire, England
- Died: 9 December 1960 (aged 71) Frinton, Essex
- Party: Labour
- Spouse: Noel Buxton (m. 1914; died 1948)
- Children: 6

Lucy Edith Noel-Buxton, Baroness Noel-Buxton (née Pelham Burn; 14 December 1888 – 9 December 1960), was a British Labour Party politician.

== Life ==
Born in Winchester to Major Henry Pelham Burn and his wife Janet Edith Orr-Ewing (daughter of Archibald Orr-Ewing), she studied at Malvern St James then at Westfield College.

== Career ==
Noel-Buxton was elected as Member of Parliament for North Norfolk at a by-election in 1930, after her husband, the MP Noel Buxton was elevated to the peerage as Baron Noel-Buxton. He had been Liberal Party MP for the seat until he was very narrowly defeated in 1918. After switching to the Labour Party he regained it in 1922 and held it at the next three elections. At the by-election Lady Noel-Buxton won the seat with a majority of only 139 votes over the Conservative candidate Thomas Cook. Cook opposed her again at the 1931 general election and this time she lost by nearly 7,000 votes as Labour suffered a landslide defeat nationally. She stood again at the 1935 general election, and was again defeated, but did manage to halve Cook's majority.

Lady Noel-Buxton returned to the House of Commons in the Labour landslide at the 1945 general election, when she was elected for the 2-seat Norwich constituency. She did not contest the 1950 general election.

== Personal life ==
She met the then Liberal politician Noel Buxton while campaigning against him on behalf of the Conservatives in 1910. They married in 1914, living initially at Paycocke's House in Coggeshall, Essex, and had six children.

She died in Frinton, Essex, in 1960.

Parliament of the United Kingdom
| Preceded by Noel Buxton | Member of Parliament for North Norfolk; 1930 – 1931 | Succeeded by Sir Thomas Cook |
| Preceded by Henry Strauss and Geoffrey Hithersay Shakespeare | Member of Parliament for Norwich; 1945 – 1950; With: John Paton | Constituency abolished |
