= 1879 North Norfolk by-election =

UK Parliamentary by-election

The 1879 North Norfolk by-election was fought on 21 January 1879. The by-election was fought due to the death of the incumbent Conservative MP, James Duff. It was won by the Conservative candidate Edward Birkbeck.

== Result ==
North Norfolk by-election, January 1879
Party	Candidate	Votes	%	±%
Conservative	Edward Birkbeck	2,742	54.9	N/A
Liberal	Thomas Buxton	2,252	45.1	N/A
Majority		490	9.8	N/A
Turnout		4,994	77.1	N/A
Conservative hold		Swing		
