= Thomas Taylour, 2nd Marquess of Headfort =

Anglo-Irish Whig politician (1787-1870)

The Most Honourable The Marquess of Headfort KP PC (Ire)

Member of Parliament (MP) for County Meath
- In office 1812–1830 Serving with Sir Marcus Somerville, 4th Baronet
- Preceded by: Thomas Cherburgh Bligh
- Succeeded by: Arthur Plunkett, 9th Earl of Fingall

Personal details
- Born: 4 May 1787
- Died: 6 December 1870 (aged 83)
- Party: Whig
- Spouse(s): Olivia Stevenson (m. 1822; died 1834) Lady Frances Macnaghten
- Children: 9
- Parents: Thomas Taylour, 1st Marquess of Headfort (father); Mary Quin (mother)
- Relatives: Thomas Taylour (son); Virginia Taylour (daughter)

Thomas Taylour, 2nd Marquess of Headfort KP PC (Ire) (4 May 1787 – 6 December 1870), styled Viscount Headfort from 1795 to 1800 and Earl of Bective from 1800 to 1829, was an Anglo-Irish Whig politician. He was the Member of Parliament (MP) for County Meath from 1812 to 1830.

Headfort was the son of Thomas Taylour, 1st Marquess of Headfort, and his wife Mary (née Quin), and succeeded his father in the marquessate in 1829. In 1831 he was created Baron Kenlis, of Kenlis in the County of Meath, in the Peerage of the United Kingdom, which entitled him to a seat in the House of Lords (his other titles being in the Peerage of Ireland). He was sworn of the Irish Privy Council in 1835 and served in the Whig administration of Lord Melbourne as a Lord-in-waiting (government whip in the House of Lords) from 1837 to 1841. Between 1831 and 1870 Headfort also held the post of Lord Lieutenant of Cavan. He was made a Knight of the Order of St Patrick in 1839.

He succeeded his father as Colonel of the disembodied Royal Meath Militia on 7 April 1823, and continued as the regiment's Honorary Colonel after it was revived in 1852.

Lord Headfort first married Olivia Dalton, widow of Edward Tuite Dalton (with whom she had a daughter, Adelaide Dalton, wife of John Young, 1st Baron Lisgar) and daughter of Sir John Andrew Stevenson, in 1822. At the time of her early death, of cholera, on 21 July 1834, she left her husband with nine children. On 6 May 1853, he married Lady Frances Macnaghten, daughter of John Livingstone Martyn and widow of (i) Lieutenant-Colonel James McClintock of the Bombay Army and (ii) Sir William Hay Macnaghten, British Envoy to Afghanistan who was murdered in Kabul in 1841. Headfort died in December 1870, aged 83, and was succeeded in the marquessate by his son from his first marriage, Thomas. Another of his children by his first marriage was the author Virginia Sandars. The second Marchioness of Headfort died in 1878.

== Notes ==
Honorary titles
New title	Lord-Lieutenant of County Cavan; 1831–1870	Succeeded by The Lord Lisgar
Peerage of Ireland
Preceded by Thomas Taylour	Marquess of Headfort; 1829–1870	Succeeded by Thomas Taylour
Peerage of the United Kingdom
New creation	Baron Kenlis; 1831–1870	Succeeded by Thomas Taylour
