= Anne Coke, Viscountess Anson =

English painter and aristocrat

The Viscountess Anson
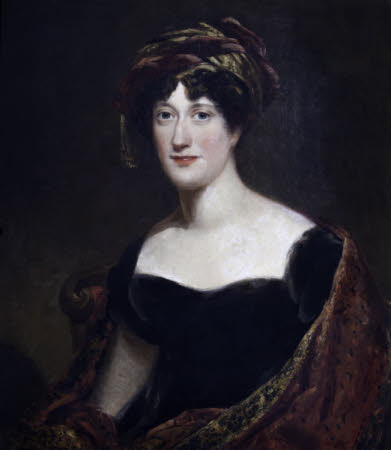
- Lady Anne Margaret Coke, Viscountess Anson, circa 1815, Shugborough Estate, National Trust
- Born: Ann Margaret Cooke (Note: Cooke or Cook is the archaic spelling of Coke, which is pronounced Cook.); 25 January 1779 (Note: Author Christopher Wright and the BBC Your Paintings site states that she was born in 1778.); Holkham Hall, Norfolk, England
- Died: 23 May 1843 (aged 64); London, England
- Occupation: Painter
- Spouse: Thomas Anson, 1st Viscount Anson
- Children: 13, including Thomas and George
- Parent: Thomas Coke, 1st Earl of Leicester of Holkham

Anne Margaret Coke, Viscountess Anson (25 January 1779 – 23 May 1843), was an English painter; the daughter of Thomas Coke, 1st Earl of Leicester of Holkham; and wife of Thomas Anson, 1st Viscount Anson.

== Personal life ==
Lady Anson was born at Holkham Hall on 25 January 1779 to Thomas Coke (who in 1834 was raised to the peerage as Earl of Leicester) and Jane Dutton. She was baptised Ann Margaret Cooke on 23 February 1779. Anne had an older sister, Jane, born in 1777, and a younger sister, Elizabeth, born in 1795, one year after Anne was married. Jane was married by that time, too. Her mother was an abolitionist and spent her allowance on donations to the poor and theater tickets for her servants. Jane Dutton also believed in the importance of a good education for her children.

At the age of 15, Anne Margaret Coke was married to 27-year-old Thomas Anson, 1st Viscount Anson, in September 1794. He was a member of parliament, worth £22,000 (equivalent to £2,530,474 in 2025) per year, and heir to Shugborough estate in Staffordshire. The Duke of Sussex said that he was a "true manly, noble, splendid fellow, possessing much of the real English character, sound sense, and although perhaps hurried away a little too much by country sports, has a great deal of good in him."

According to Susanna Wade Martins, Anne was described as "thin, excitable, energetic, never quiet, constantly getting into quarrels, but always ready to help others. Dawson Turner described her as a woman of sweet character and a pleasing personality.

Anson gave birth to eleven children, four by the time she was 20 years of age.

She died 23 May 1843 in London. Her tomb in St. Michael and All Angels Church, Colwich, Staffordshire, was sculpted by John Francis.

== Artist ==
Susanna Wade Martins in Coke of Norfolk (1754–1842) states that Anne was likely taught to draw by Thomas Gainsborough in Norfolk and London. One of her paintings of a milk girl was made after one of Gainsborough's paintings. She was said to have made a painting of a nest of owls that was considered "very well done" by Benjamin Haydon. Mrs. Powys, who visited Shugborough in 1800, stated that competent works by Anson were in every room of the house, including three full-length paintings of her children.

Shugborough Hall, National Trust Collection

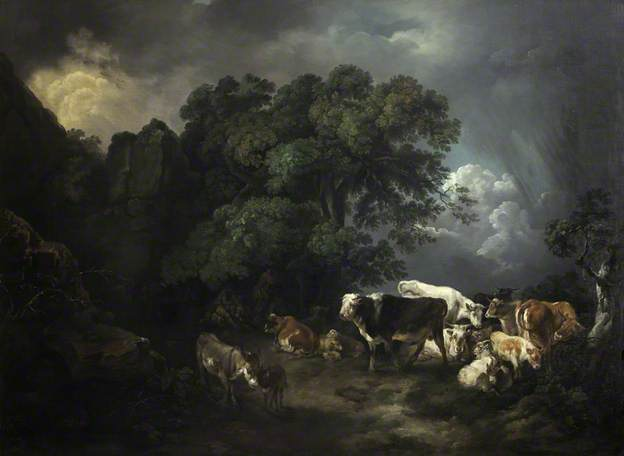

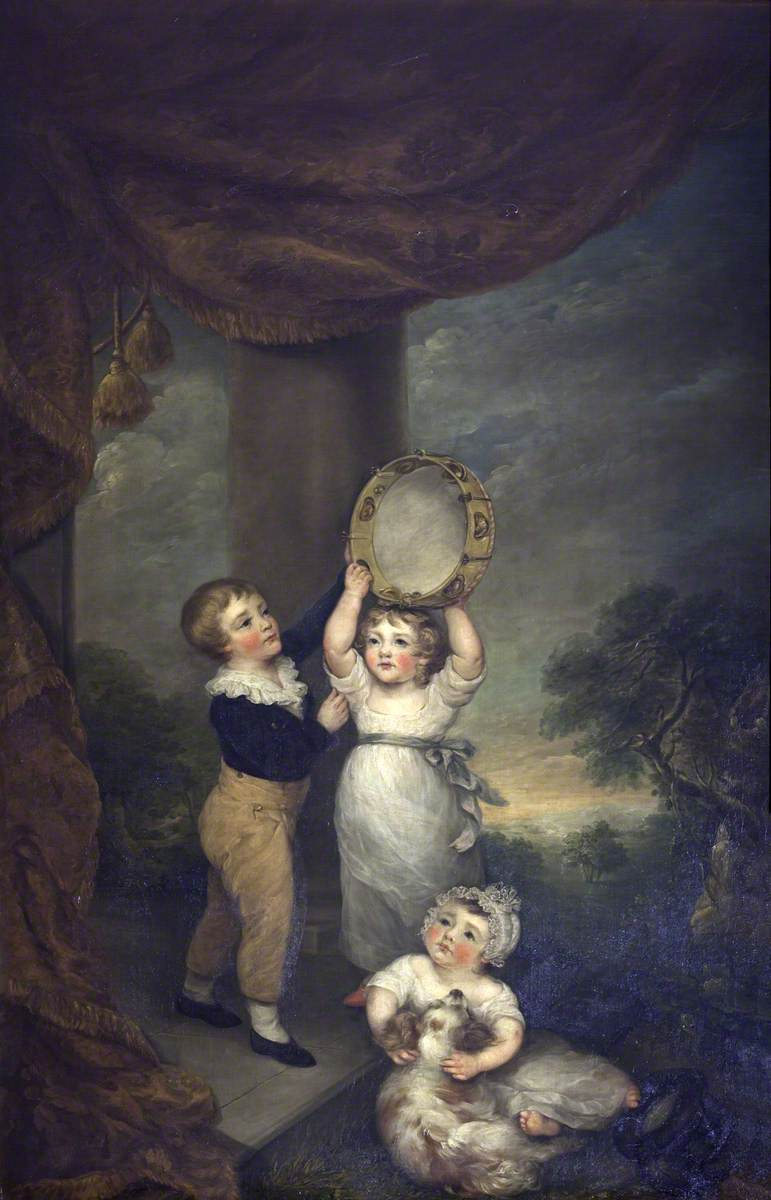

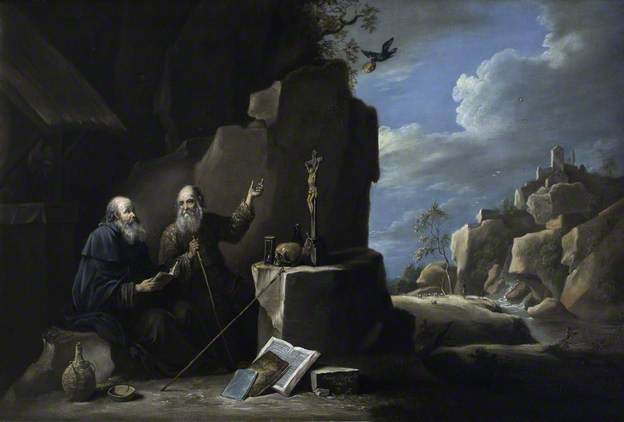
- Animals Sheltering in a Storm, after Philip James de Loutherbourg
- Thomas William Anson (1795–1854), Later 1st Earl of Lichfield, Anne Margaret Anson (1796–1882), Later Countess of Rosebery, and George Anson (1797–1857), Later Major General and Commander in Chief of India, as Children
- Elijah and the Ravens, after Teniers
