= James Goodson =

Member of Parliament for Great Yarmouth
- In office 11 July 1865 – 11 November 1868 Serving with Edmund Lacon
- Preceded by: Edmund Lacon; Henry Stracey
- Succeeded by: Constituency disenfranchised

Personal details
- Born: 1818
- Died: 14 May 1895 (aged 76–77)
- Party: Conservative

James Goodson (1818 – 14 May 1895) was a British Conservative Party politician and railways director.

Goodson was elected Conservative MP for Great Yarmouth at the 1865 general election and held the seat until 1868 until it was disenfranchised under the Reform Act 1867 for corruption.

Between 1863 and 1866, Goodson was a chairman of the Great Eastern Railway Company, and in February 1879, he became director of the Milford Docks Company.

Parliament of the United Kingdom
Preceded by Edmund Lacon; Henry Stracey	Member of Parliament for Great Yarmouth; 1865–1868; With: Edmund Lacon	Constituency disenfranchised
