= Edmund Lacon =

English businessman and politician (1807-1888)

Sir Edmund Henry Knowles Lacon 3rd Baronet

Member of Parliament for Great Yarmouth
- In office 1852–1857 Serving with Charles Rumbold
- Preceded by: Joseph Sandars; Charles Rumbold
- Succeeded by: Edward Watkin; John Mellor

Member of Parliament for Great Yarmouth
- In office 1859–1868 Serving with Sir Henry Stracey, Bt to 1865; James Goodson from 1865
- Preceded by: Adolphus William Young; John Mellor
- Succeeded by: Constituency disenfranchised

Personal details
- Born: 14 August 1807
- Died: 2 December 1888 (aged 81)
- Party: Conservative
- Spouse: Eliza Georgiana Hammet (m. 1839; died 1881)
- Children: 6
- Parents: Sir Edmund Lacon, 2nd Baronet (father); Eliza Beecroft (mother)
- Relatives: Henry Goring Ravenhill (son-in-law)
- Education: Eton College
- Alma mater: Emmanuel College, Cambridge
- Military career
- Allegiance: United Kingdom
- Branch: British Army
- Service years: 1860–1881
- Rank: Honorary Colonel
- Units: East Norfolk Militia; 1st Norfolk Artillery Volunteers; Norfolk Regiment

Sir Edmund Henry Knowles Lacon, 3rd Baronet (14 August 1807 – 2 December 1888) was an English businessman and liberal Conservative politician who sat in the House of Commons in two periods between 1852 and 1885.

== Early life ==
Lacon was the son of Sir Edmund Knowles Lacon, 2nd Baronet, and his wife Eliza Beecroft, daughter of Thomas Beecroft of Saxthorpe Hall. He was educated at Eton College and Emmanuel College, Cambridge. In 1839 he inherited the baronetcy on the death of his father.

== Business career ==
Lacon became a brewer and banker at Great Yarmouth. He was one of the original shareholders in the Yarmouth and Norwich Railway in 1842 which was Norfolk's first railway. He was later a director of the Yarmouth and Haddiscoe Railway and the East Suffolk Railway. He was also Chairman of the Great Yarmouth and Stalham Light Railway which later became part of the Midland and Great Northern Joint Railway.

== Military career ==
He was appointed Lieutenant Colonel commanding the East Norfolk Militia on 16 March 1860 and of the 1st Norfolk Administrative Battalion of Artillery Volunteers on 2 December 1864. He later became Honorary Colonel of both units' successors, the 4th Battalion, Norfolk Regiment and the 1st Norfolk Artillery Volunteers (31 December 1881).

== Political career ==
Lacon was elected as a Member of Parliament (MP) for Great Yarmouth at the 1852 general election and held the seat until his defeat in 1857. He regained the seat in 1859 and held it until the seat was disenfranchised for corruption at the 1868 general election. At the 1868 general election he was elected instead as MP for North Norfolk. He held that seat until the 1885 general election, when he did not stand again.

== Public life ==
He was a Deputy Lieutenant and JP for Norfolk, a JP for Suffolk and High Steward of Yarmouth.

== Family life ==
On 23 March 1839 Lacon married Eliza Georgiana Hammet (d. 31 March 1881), daughter of James Esdaile Hammet of Battersea, and they had six children:

- Edmund Broughton Knowles Lacon (9 May 1842 – 11 August 1899), who succeeded his father as 4th Baronet
- Thomas Beecroft Ussher Lacon (24 February 1845 – 28 February 1899), whose eldest son, Edmund Beecroft Francis Heathcote Lacon, succeeded as 5th Baronet, and whose third son, Harry Reginald Dunbar Lacon, married Hilda Mary Slayter, a Titanic survivor.
- Henry Sidney Hammett Lacon (December 1847–30 June 1900)
- Ernest De Montesquiou Lacon (1 May 1850 – 31 May 1936)
- Georgina Lacon, (d. 4 April 1933) married Major-General Charles Henry Gordon
- Eliza Walpole Lacon (d. 22 January 1928) married Colonel Henry Goring Ravenhill

Lacon died at the age of 81.

== Arms ==
Coat of arms of Edmund Lacon
Crest A mount Vert thereon a falcon Proper beaked and belled Or charged on the breast with a cross flory and gorged with a collar Gules. Escutcheon Quarterly per fess indented Erminois and Azure in the second quarter a wolf’s head erased Or. Motto Probitas Verus Honos

Parliament of the United Kingdom
Preceded by Joseph Sandars; Charles Rumbold	Member of Parliament for Great Yarmouth; 1852–1857; With: Charles Rumbold	Succeeded by Edward Watkin; John Mellor
Preceded by Adolphus William Young; John Mellor	Member of Parliament for Great Yarmouth; 1859–1868; With: Sir Henry Stracey, Bt to 1865; James Goodson from 1865	Constituency disenfranchised
New constituency	Member of Parliament for North Norfolk; 1868–1885; With: Frederick Walpole to 1876; James Duff 1876–79; Edward Birkbeck from 1879	Succeeded by Herbert Cozens-Hardy
Baronetage of the United Kingdom
Preceded by Edmund Lacon	Baronet (of Great Yarmouth); 1839–1888	Succeeded by Edmund Broughton Knowles Lacon
