= Edward Birkbeck =

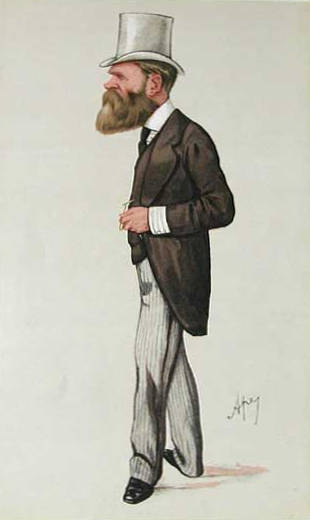
"the fisherman's friend" Birkbeck as caricatured by Ape (Carlo Pellegrini) in Vanity Fair, August 1885

Sir Edward Birkbeck, 1st Baronet KCVO DL (11 October 1838 – 2 September 1908) was a Conservative Party politician in the United Kingdom.

== Biography ==
Birkbeck was born in 1838 and served as Conservative MP for North Norfolk from 1879 (being returned at a by-election following the death of Colonel Duff) to 1885 and for East Norfolk from 1885 to 1892. He was defeated in the 1892 general election by Sir Robert Price. He was created a baronet, of Horstead Hall, in the parish of Horstead, in the County of Norfolk on 9 March 1886. The baronetage became extinct in 1908 on his death.

Escutcheon of the Birkbeck baronets of Horstead Hall

Birkbeck resided at Horstead Hall, a mansion located in extensive and secluded grounds outside Horstead, Norfolk, remodelled in the Tudor style in 1835. He entertained Lord Salisbury there on at least one occasion (1887), and bred Jersey cattle there. Sir Edward greatly improved the farm buildings, adding, among other things, a watertower in the Italian style that remains a local landmark, cottages and one of the two lodges facing towards Buxton.

Sir Edward served as, among other things, President of the National Sea Fisheries Protection Association, and Chairman of the Royal National Lifeboat Institution.

In June 1902 he was on board German torpedo boat S. 42 when it sank off Cuxhaven, after it was accidentally run over by the steam ship SS Frisby. Sir Edward had been granted passage in the torpedo boat from Heligoland to Cuxhaven, returning from the Dover to Heligoland yacht race, and survived unharmed, though the captain and several German crew members drowned.

Sir Edward Birkbeck died on 2 September 1908. The Horstead Hall estate passed to a collateral branch of the family. His wife survived him. A branch of the family still resides in the area, at Rippon Hall, a mansion in much the same style between Buxton and Reepham.

Parliament of the United Kingdom
Preceded by James Duff; Sir Edmund Lacon	Member of Parliament for North Norfolk; 1879 – 1885; With: Sir Edmund Lacon	Succeeded by Herbert Cozens-Hardy
New constituency	Member of Parliament for East Norfolk; 1885 – 1892	Succeeded by Sir Robert Price
Baronetage of the United Kingdom
New creation	Baronet (of Horstead Hall); 1886–1908	Extinct
Preceded by Orr-Ewing baronets	Birkbeck baronets of Horstead Hall; 9 March 1886	Succeeded by Cook baronets
