= 2019 North Norfolk District Council election =

2019 UK local government election

- May 2019

All 40 seats to North Norfolk District Council 21 seats needed for a majority

	First party	Second party	Third party
Party	Liberal Democrats	Conservative	Independent
Last election	15 seats, 29.4%	33 seats, 38.5%	0 seats, 0.9%
Seats won	30	6	4
Seat change	▲15	▼27	▲4
Popular vote	15,355	10,249	2,509
Percentage	48.8%	32.5%	8.0%
Swing	▲20.9%	▼5.7%	▲6.8%
- Winner of each seat at the 2019 North Norfolk District Council election
Control before election
Conservative
Control after election
Liberal Democrats

The 2019 North Norfolk District Council election took place on 2 May 2019 to elect members of North Norfolk District Council in England. This was on the same day as other local elections. The whole council was up for election on new boundaries and the number of seats was reduced by 8. The Liberal Democrats gained control of the council.

== Election result ==
2019 North Norfolk District Council election
Party	Seats	Gains	Losses	Net gain/loss	Seats %	Votes %	Votes	+/−
Liberal Democrats	30			▲15	75.0	48.8	15,355	+20.9
Conservative	6			▼27	15.0	32.5	10,249	-5.7
Independent	4			▲4	10.0	8.0	2,509	+6.8
Labour	0			Steady	0.0	6.5	2,043	-8.4
Green	0			Steady	0.0	4.2	1,332	-5.3

== Ward results ==
=== Bacton ===
Bacton
Party	Candidate	Votes	%	±%
Liberal Democrats	Eric Stockton	319	45.1	
Independent	Pauline Porter	168	23.8	
Conservative	Crispian Riley-Smith	168	23.8	
Labour	Fiona Hall	52	7.4	
Majority		151	21.3	
Turnout		717	35.41	
Liberal Democrats win (new seat)				

=== Beeston Regis and The Runtons ===
Beeston Regis and The Runtons
Party	Candidate	Votes	%	±%
Liberal Democrats	Sarah Butikofer*	623	62.9	
Conservative	Michael Knowles*	331	33.4	
Labour	Albert Winslade	36	3.6	
Majority		292	29.5	
Turnout		1,004	45.47	
Liberal Democrats win (new seat)				

=== Briston ===
Briston
Party	Candidate	Votes	%	±%
Liberal Democrats	Jolanda Stenton	408	57.5	
Conservative	Jennifer English*	271	38.2	
Labour	Ruth Bartlett	30	4.2	
Majority		137	19.3	
Turnout		720	35.49	
Liberal Democrats gain from Conservative		Swing		

=== Coastal ===
Coastal
Party	Candidate	Votes	%	±%
Liberal Democrats	Karen Ward*	652	66.2	
Conservative	Michael Dalby	289	29.3	
Labour	Steven Rush	44	4.5	
Majority		363	36.9	
Turnout		1,000	50.23	
Liberal Democrats win (new seat)				

=== Cromer Town ===
Cromer Town
Party	Candidate	Votes	%	±%
Liberal Democrats	Timothy Adams	972	61.1	
Liberal Democrats	Andreas Yiasimi*	931	58.5	
Conservative	John Lee*	359	22.6	
Conservative	Roger Cunnington	334	21.0	
Green	Michael Bossingham	213	13.4	
Labour	Philip Harris	109	6.9	
Labour	Scarlett Franklin	95	6.0	
Majority		572	35.9	
Turnout		1,609	40.34	
Liberal Democrats gain from Conservative				
Liberal Democrats hold				

=== Erpingham ===
Erpingham
Party	Candidate	Votes	%	±%
Liberal Democrats	John Toye	364	34.6	
Conservative	Peter Willcox	294	28.0	
Independent	Norman Smith*	196	18.6	
Green	Stephen Green	121	11.5	
Labour	Andrew Steed	76	7.2	
Majority		70	6.6	
Turnout		1,063	48.34	
Liberal Democrats gain from Conservative		Swing		

Norman Smith had previously been elected as a Conservative Party councillor.

=== Gresham ===
Gresham
Party	Candidate	Votes	%	±%
Liberal Democrats	Heinrich Butikofer*	400	43.8	
Independent	Callum Ringer	238	26.1	
Conservative	Hugh Cabbell Manners	237	26.0	
Labour	Stuart Jones	37	4.1	
Majority		162	17.7	
Turnout		928	47.08	
Liberal Democrats win (new seat)				

=== Happisburgh ===
Happisburgh
Party	Candidate	Votes	%	±%
Liberal Democrats	Lucy Shires	449	48.5	
Conservative	Richard Price*	279	30.2	
Green	Anne Filgate	105	11.4	
Labour	Stephen Burke	92	9.9	
Majority		170	18.3	
Turnout		956	43.36	
Liberal Democrats hold		Swing		

=== Hickling ===
Hickling
Party	Candidate	Votes	%	±%
Liberal Democrats	Harry Blathwayt	455	52.3	
Conservative	Jane Simpson	210	24.1	
Independent	Paul Rice*	171	19.7	
Labour	Finlay Brisbane-Langsdon	34	3.9	
Majority		245	28.2	
Turnout		887	41.26	
Liberal Democrats win (new seat)				

Paul Rice had previously been elected as a Conservative Party councillor.

=== Holt ===
Holt
Party	Candidate	Votes	%	±%
Conservative	Duncan Baker*	851	50.8	
Liberal Democrats	Georgina Perry-Warnes*	805	48.1	
Liberal Democrats	Lyndon Swift	791	47.2	
Conservative	Margaret Prior*	548	32.7	
Majority		14	0.9	
Turnout		1,694	47.52	
Conservative hold				
Liberal Democrats hold				

Georgina Perry-Warnes had previously been elected as a Conservative Party councillor.

=== Hoveton and Tunstead ===
Hoveton and Tunstead
Party	Candidate	Votes	%	±%
Conservative	Nigel Dixon*	857	58.9	
Conservative	Gerard Mancini-Boyle	682	46.9	
Liberal Democrats	Mary Seward	542	37.3	
Liberal Democrats	Sarah Tustin	424	29.1	
Labour	Jean Thirtle	133	9.1	
Majority		140	9.6	
Turnout		1,490	34.89	
Conservative win (new seat)				
Conservative win (new seat)				

=== Lancaster North ===
Lancaster North
Party	Candidate	Votes	%	±%
Conservative	Christopher Cushing	250	55.6	
Liberal Democrats	Sean Mears	200	44.4	
Majority		50	11.2	
Turnout		461	24.78	
Conservative hold		Swing		

=== Lancaster South ===
Lancaster South
Party	Candidate	Votes	%	±%
Independent	Jeremy Punchard*	573	49.5	
Independent	John Rest*	470	40.6	
Conservative	Ann Claussen-Reynolds*	451	39.0	
Conservative	Michael Reynolds*	417	36.0	
Labour	Imogen Bruce	214	18.5	
Majority		19	1.6	
Turnout		1,171	27.15	
Independent gain from Conservative				
Independent gain from Conservative				

Jeremy Punchard and John Rest had previously been elected as Conservative Party councillors.

=== Mundesley ===
Mundesley
Party	Candidate	Votes	%	±%
Liberal Democrats	Wendy Fredericks	558	59.9	
Conservative	Barry Smith*	292	31.3	
Green	Elizabeth Dixon	80	8.6	
Majority		266	28.6	
Turnout		947	42.81	
Liberal Democrats gain from Conservative		Swing		

=== North Waltham East ===
North Waltham East
Party	Candidate	Votes	%	±%
Liberal Democrats	Eric Seward*	716	66.3	
Liberal Democrats	Paul Heinrich	643	59.5	
Conservative	Jeremy Eales	234	21.7	
Conservative	Richard Sear	207	19.2	
Labour	Jeanne Heal	131	12.1	
Labour	Elizabeth McKenna	100	9.3	
Majority		409	37.8	
Turnout		1,102	29.11	
Liberal Democrats hold				
Liberal Democrats hold				

=== North Walsham Market Cross ===
North Walsham Market Cross
Party	Candidate	Votes	%	±%
Liberal Democrats	Virginia Gay*	486	63.9	
Conservative	Fiona Turner	216	28.4	
Labour	Jacqueline Cross	59	7.8	
Majority		270	35.5	
Turnout		784	37.62	
Liberal Democrats win (new seat)				

=== North Waltham West ===
North Waltham West
Party	Candidate	Votes	%	±%
Liberal Democrats	Donald Birch	727	55.8	
Liberal Democrats	Nigel Lloyd*	717	55.0	
Independent	Barry Hester	210	16.1	
Conservative	Nina Baker	192	14.7	
Conservative	Marjorie Eales	180	13.8	
Labour	Elaine Addison	130	10.0	
Labour	Raymond Mooney	90	6.9	
Majority		507	38.9	
Turnout		1,322	29.30	
Liberal Democrats hold				
Liberal Democrats hold				

=== Poppyland ===
Poppyland
Party	Candidate	Votes	%	±%
Independent	Angela Fitch-Tillett*	284	33.2	
Liberal Democrats	Jill Aquarone	201	23.5	
Conservative	Diana Irving	179	20.9	
Green	Edward Anderson	158	18.5	
Labour	Christine Collins	34	4.0	
Majority		83	9.7	
Turnout		871	41.58	
Independent gain from Conservative		Swing		

Angela Fitch-Tillett had previously been elected as a Conservative Party councillor.

=== Priory ===
Priory
Party	Candidate	Votes	%	±%
Liberal Democrats	Richard Kershaw	296	39.3	
Conservative	Daniel Mann	215	28.5	
Independent	Ann Green*	201	26.7	
Labour	Martin Langsdon	42	5.6	
Majority		81	10.8	
Turnout		759	40.27	
Liberal Democrats gain from Conservative		Swing		

Ann Green had previously been elected as a Conservative Party councillor.

=== Roughton ===
Roughton
Party	Candidate	Votes	%	±%
Liberal Democrats	Nigel Pearce*	430	54.2	
Conservative	Susan Arnold*	364	45.8	
Majority		66	8.4	
Turnout		819	36.35	
Liberal Democrats gain from Conservative		Swing		

Nigel Pearce had previously been elected as a Conservative Party councillor.

=== Sheringham North ===
Sheringham North
Party	Candidate	Votes	%	±%
Liberal Democrats	Brian Hannah*	472	63.4	
Conservative	Edward Mayell	187	25.1	
Labour	Susan Brisbane	85	11.4	
Majority		285	38.3	
Turnout		757	37.27	
Liberal Democrats hold		Swing		

=== Sheringham South ===
Sheringham South
Party	Candidate	Votes	%	±%
Liberal Democrats	Colin Heinink	875	50.3	
Liberal Democrats	Penelope Bevan Jones	873	50.2	
Conservative	Richard Shepherd*	713	41.0	
Conservative	Judith Oliver*	705	40.5	
Labour	Mark Rosen	100	5.7	
Majority		160	9.2	
Turnout		1,772	42.77	
Liberal Democrats gain from Conservative				
Liberal Democrats gain from Conservative				

=== St Benet ===
St Benet
Party	Candidate	Votes	%	±%
Liberal Democrats	Adam Varley	603	66.3	
Conservative	Dennis Simpson	272	29.9	
Labour	Anna Walsh	34	3.7	
Majority		331	36.4	
Turnout		929	45.61	
Liberal Democrats hold		Swing		

=== Stalham ===
Stalham
Party	Candidate	Votes	%	±%
Liberal Democrats	Pauline Grove-Jones*	762	52.9	
Liberal Democrats	Marion Millership*	733	50.9	
Conservative	Robert Stevens*	464	32.2	
Conservative	Jonathan Payne	397	27.6	
Green	Michael Macartney-Filgate	232	16.1	
Labour	Timothy Bartlett	127	8.8	
Majority		269	18.7	
Turnout		1,475	33.41	
Liberal Democrats win (new seat)				
Liberal Democrats win (new seat)				

=== Stibbard ===
Stibbard
Party	Candidate	Votes	%	±%
Conservative	Vincent Fitzpatrick*	381	40.9	
Liberal Democrats	Michael Pert	309	33.2	
Green	Barbara Wyvill	242	26.0	
Majority		72	7.7	
Turnout		955	41.98	
Conservative win (new seat)				

=== Stody ===
Stody
Party	Candidate	Votes	%	±%
Liberal Democrats	Andrew Brown	599	68.9	
Conservative	Steven de la Salle	213	24.5	
Labour	Edmund Wright	58	6.7	
Majority		386	44.4	
Turnout		887	46.29	
Liberal Democrats win (new seat)				

=== Suffield Park ===
Suffield Park
Party	Candidate	Votes	%	±%
Liberal Democrats	Emma Spagnola	544	59.3	
Conservative	Beverley Broadhead	285	31.1	
Labour	John Lee	88	9.6	
Majority		259	28.2	
Turnout		931	41.69	
Liberal Democrats gain from Conservative		Swing		

=== The Raynhams ===
The Raynhams
Party	Candidate	Votes	%	±%
Independent	Nigel Housden	240	42.6	
Conservative	Rebecca Palmer*	220	39.0	
Liberal Democrats	Susan Traverso	104	18.4	
Majority		20	3.6	
Turnout		571	27.29	
Independent gain from Conservative		Swing		

=== Trunch ===
Trunch
Party	Candidate	Votes	%	±%
Liberal Democrats	Gregory Hayman	453	52.0	
Conservative	David Attew	236	27.1	
Green	Graham Jones	127	14.6	
Labour	Michael Ward	55	6.3	
Majority		217	24.9	
Turnout		889	40.72	
Liberal Democrats win (new seat)				

=== Walsingham ===
Walsingham
Party	Candidate	Votes	%	±%
Conservative	Thomas Fitzpatrick*	395	52.3	
Independent	Simon Hester*	228	30.2	
Liberal Democrats	Andrea Osbourne	132	17.5	
Majority		167	22.1	
Turnout		767	37.43	
Conservative hold		Swing		

Simon Hester had previously been elected as a Conservative Party councillor.

=== Wells with Holkham ===
Wells with Holkham
Party	Candidate	Votes	%	±%
Liberal Democrats	Peter Fisher	307	43.4	
Conservative	David Mack	202	28.5	
Labour	Michael Gates	199	28.1	
Majority		105	14.9	
Turnout		715	36.31	
Liberal Democrats win (new seat)				

=== Worstead ===
Worstead
Party	Candidate	Votes	%	±%
Liberal Democrats	Saul Penfold*	592	71.2	
Conservative	Alistair Mackay	142	17.1	
Green	Lynne Irons	54	6.5	
Labour	Terence Smith	44	5.3	
Majority		450	54.1	
Turnout		851	39.77	
Liberal Democrats gain from Conservative		Swing		

== By-elections ==
=== Sheringham North ===
A by-election was held after the resignation of Brian Hannah.

Sheringham North: 28 November 2019
Party	Candidate	Votes	%	±%
Liberal Democrats	Liz Withington	364	48.4	−15.0
Conservative	Richard Shepherd	323	43.0	+17.9
Labour	Sue Brisbane	65	8.6	−2.8
Majority		41	5.5	
Turnout		752		
Liberal Democrats hold		Swing		

=== Coastal ===
A by-election was held after the resignation of Karen Ward.

Coastal: 6 May 2021
Party	Candidate	Votes	%	±%
Conservative	Alison Holliday	585	58.7	+29.4
Liberal Democrats	Philip Bailey	303	30.4	−35.8
Labour	William Gee	108	10.8	+6.3
Majority		282	28.3	N/A
Turnout		998	49.7	−0.5
Conservative gain from Liberal Democrats		Swing	▲18.5	

=== Holt ===
A by-election was held after the resignation of Duncan Baker.

Holt: 6 May 2021
Party	Candidate	Votes	%	±%
Conservative	Eric Vardy	837	47.8	−3.0
Independent	Jonathon Read	738	42.2	N/A
Labour	Jasper Haywood	112	6.4	N/A
Independent	Nicholas Coppack	63	3.6	N/A
Majority		99	5.6	+4.7
Turnout		1,773	47.2	−0.3
Conservative hold		Swing		

=== Stalham ===
A by-election was held after the resignation of Marion Millership.

Stalham: 2 December 2021
Party	Candidate	Votes	%	±%
Conservative	Matthew Taylor	559	55.2	+23.0
Liberal Democrats	Barbara McGoun	375	37.0	−13.9
Labour	Richard Stowe	79	7.8	−1.0
Majority		184	18.2	N/A
Turnout		1,016	22.5	−10.9
Conservative gain from Liberal Democrats		Swing		
