= Charles Rumbold =

British politician

Charles Edmund Rumbold (11 August 1788 – 31 May 1857) was a British Whig politician.

He was the fifth son of Sir Thomas Rumbold, 1st Baronet, and his second wife Joanna Law, daughter of Edmund Law, Bishop of Carlisle. Rumbold was educated at Oriel College, Oxford, and then went to Trinity College, Cambridge. In 1812, he began his Grand Tour and returned a year later.

Rumbold was elected as a Member of Parliament (MP) for Great Yarmouth in 1818, a seat he held until 1835. In the general election of 1837 he returned to the House of Commons and sat for the constituency again until 1847. In a by-election the following year, he was elected a third time for Great Yarmouth and represented it until his death in 1857.

In 1834, he married Harriet, daughter of John Gardner, and had three sons with her. He died at Brighton, at the age of 68, and was buried at Preston Candover in Hampshire.

Parliament of the United Kingdom
| Preceded by William Loftus; Edmund Knowles Lacon | Member of Parliament for Great Yarmouth; 1818–1835; With: Thomas Anson 1818–1819; Hon. George Anson 1819–1835 | Succeeded by Thomas Baring; Winthrop Mackworth Praed |
| Preceded by Thomas Baring; Winthrop Mackworth Praed | Member of Parliament for Great Yarmouth; 1837–1847; With: William Wilshere | Succeeded by Lord Arthur Lennox; Octavius Coope |
| Preceded by Lord Arthur Lennox; Octavius Coope | Member of Parliament for Great Yarmouth; 1848–1857; With: Joseph Sandars 1848–1852; Sir Edmund Lacon 1852–1857 | Succeeded by William Torrens McCullagh; Edward Watkin |
