= Thomas Cook (MP for North Norfolk) =

Lieutenant colonel Sir Thomas Cook JP

Member of Parliament for North Norfolk
- In office 1931–1945
- Preceded by: Lucy Noel-Buxton
- Succeeded by: Edwin Gooch

Personal details
- Born: Thomas Russell Albert Mason Cook; 12 June 1902
- Died: 12 August 1970 (aged 68) Fakenham, England
- Party: Conservative; Labour
- Spouse: Gweneth Margaret Jones (after 1926)

Sir Thomas Russell Albert Mason Cook JP (12 June 1902 – 12 August 1970) was a Conservative Party politician in the United Kingdom. He served as a Member of Parliament (MP) from 1931 to 1945.

== Early life ==
Cook was born on 12 June 1902, the only son of Thomas Albert Cook, who built Sennowe Hall in Norfolk in 1907. He became Lord of the Manors of Stibbard and Great and Little Ryburgh.

His paternal grandfather was John Mason Cook and his great-grandfather was Thomas Cook, who founded the travel agency Thomas Cook & Son.

== Career ==
At the 1924 general election, he was an unsuccessful candidate in the Labour held constituency of North Norfolk. He was defeated again by Labour's Noel Buxton at the 1929 general election, and at the by-election in 1930 when Lady Noel-Buxton held the seat with a majority of only 139 votes after her husband's elevation to the peerage.

At the 1931 general election, Cook won the seat from Lady Noel-Buxton with a majority of nearly 7,000. He was re-elected at the 1935 election. At 34, he was knighted for "political and public services" in the 1937 New Year Honours, becoming "the youngest man to be knighted in a quarter-century." During his time in the Commons, he was known as "the firemen's M.P." because he maintained a 14-man fire department on his estate. In the Labour landslide at the 1945 general election, he was ousted by Labour's Edwin Gooch.

He was a director of his family firm, the Thomas Cook & Son travel agency, which had been founded by his great-grandfather. Cook was a member of the Royal Norfolk Agricultural Association and served on the Norfolk County Council. From 1930 to 1955 he ran the Norfolk Chronicle. He was county commissioner for the Norfolk St John Ambulance Brigade and Master of the Glaziers' Company in London.

== Personal life ==
On 13 February 1926, Cook was married to Gweneth Margaret Jones at the Norwich Cathedral by John Willink, the Dean of Norwich. She was the only daughter of late Spencer Evan Jones of Banwell Abbey, Somerset. Together, they were the parents of one son and three daughters:

- Geraldine Beatrice Cook (c. 1927–2018), who married Lt. Cdr. Leofric Douglas Temple-Richards.
- Thomas Cook
- Rosemary Gweneth Cook, who married Michael Champernowne Litton, son of William Roy Upton Litton, in 1953.
- Hazel Elizabeth Margaret Cook (b. 1944), who married George Alston-Roberts-West, a younger son of Maj. William Reginald James Alston-Roberts-West and Constance Isolde Grosvenor (granddaughter of the 1st Duke of Westminster), in 1970. Hazel was a lady-in-waiting to Princess Diana.

Cook died on 12 August 1970 in Fakenham, England. His descendants, the Temple-Richards family, live at his previous home, Sennowe Hall, Sennowe Park in Norfolk.

Parliament of the United Kingdom
Preceded by Lucy Noel-Buxton	Member of Parliament for North Norfolk; 1931 – 1945	Succeeded by Edwin Gooch
