= Thomas Anson, 1st Earl of Lichfield =

British Whig politician (1795–1854)

The Right Honourable The Earl of Lichfield PC
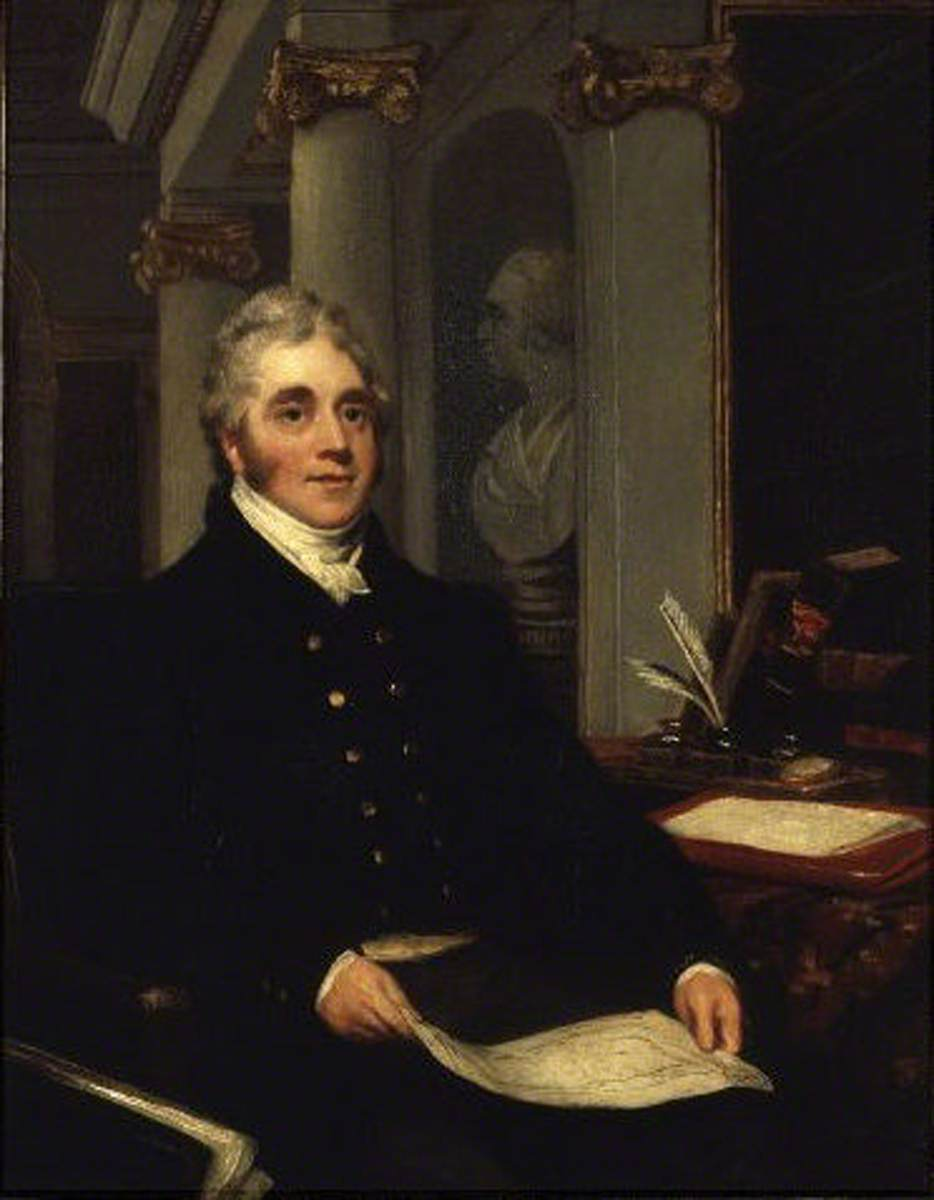

Master of the Buckhounds
- In office 24 November 1830 – 14 November 1834
- Monarch: William IV
- Prime Minister: The Earl Grey; The Viscount Melbourne
- Preceded by: The Lord Maryborough
- Succeeded by: The Earl of Chesterfield

Postmaster General
- In office 22 May 1835 – 30 August 1841
- Monarchs: William IV; Victoria
- Prime Minister: The Viscount Melbourne
- Preceded by: The Marquess Conyngham
- Succeeded by: Viscount Lowther

Member of Parliament for Great Yarmouth
- In office 1818–1819 Serving with Charles Edmund Rumbold
- Preceded by: Edmund Knowles Lacon; William Loftus
- Succeeded by: Charles Rumbold; Hon. George Anson

Personal details
- Born: 20 October 1795 Shugborough Hall, Staffordshire, England
- Died: 18 March 1854 (aged 58) Mayfair, London
- Party: Whig
- Spouse: Louisa Philips (d. 1879)
- Children: 8, including Thomas and Augustus
- Parent(s): Thomas Anson, 1st Viscount Anson; Lady Anne Margaret Coke
- Education: Christ Church, Oxford

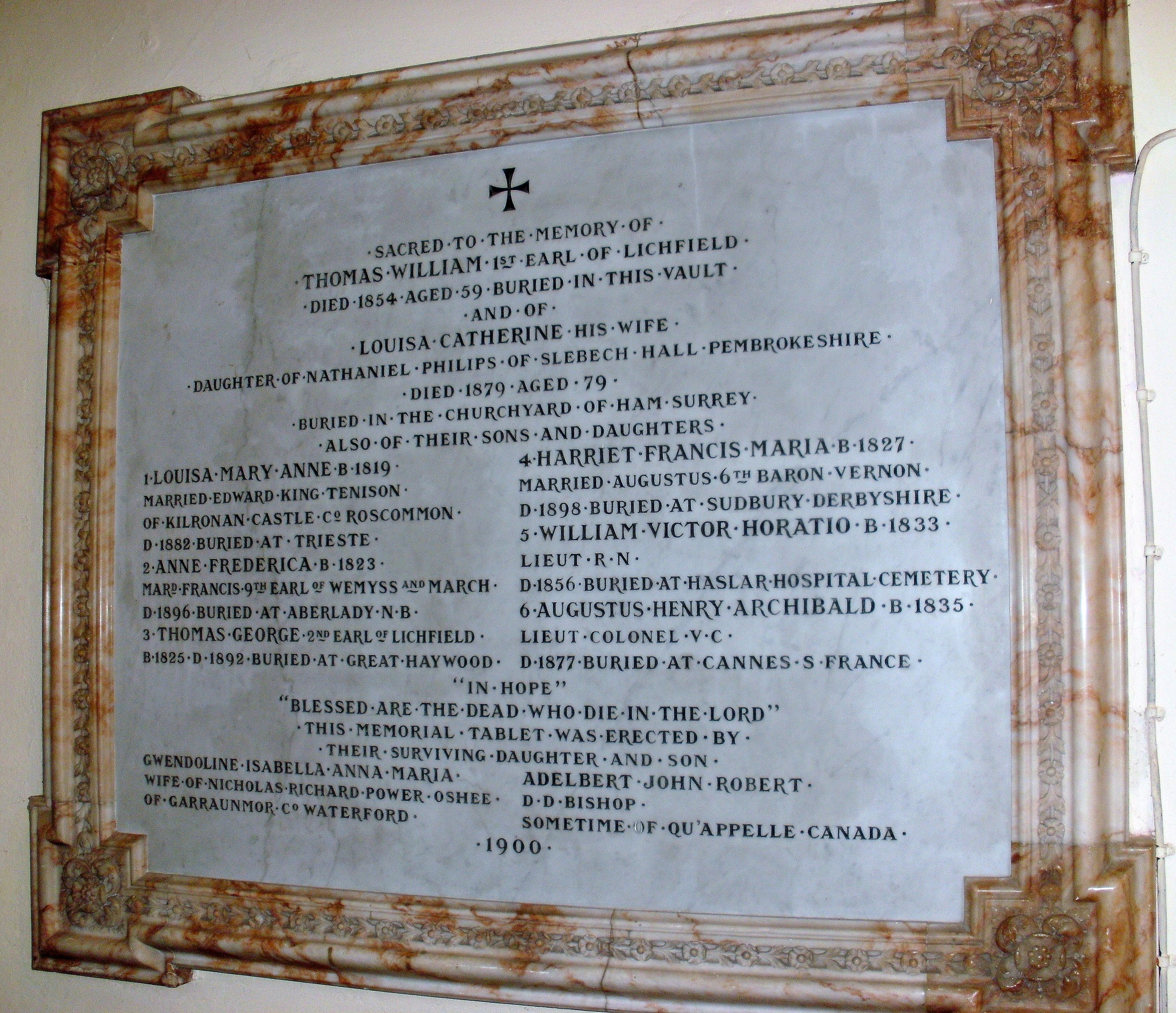
Anson family memorial at St Michael and All Angels Church in Colwich

Thomas William Anson, 1st Earl of Lichfield PC (20 October 1795 – 18 March 1854), known as Viscount Anson from 1818 to 1831, was a British Whig politician from the Anson family. He served under Lord Grey and Lord Melbourne as Master of the Buckhounds between 1830 and 1834 and under Melbourne Postmaster General between 1835 and 1841.

Lichfield's gambling and lavish entertaining got him heavily into debt and he was forced to sell off the entire contents of his Shugborough Hall estate.

== Early life ==
Anson was the eldest son of Thomas Anson, 1st Viscount Anson, and his wife Anne Margaret, daughter of Thomas Coke, 1st Earl of Leicester. Major-General the Hon. George Anson was his younger brother. He was educated at Eton and Christ Church, Oxford.

== Career ==
Anson was elected to the House of Commons for Great Yarmouth in June 1818, but had to resign the seat the following month on the death of his father and his succession to viscountcy of Anson. Anson later served under Lord Grey and Lord Melbourne as Master of the Buckhounds from 1830 to 1834 and under Melbourne as Postmaster General from 1835 to 1841. He was admitted to the Privy Council in 1830 and in 1831 he was created Earl of Lichfield, of Lichfield in the County of Stafford, in William IV's coronation honours.

=== Military career ===
He had joined the part-time Staffordshire Yeomanry as a trooper in 1811 before being appointed captain of the Lichfield Troop on 3 August 1812. He was promoted to major on 27 September 1819 and to lieutenant-colonel and second-in-command on 17 December 1829. The regiment provided the escort when the Duchess of Kent and her daughter Princess Victoria visited him at Shugborough in 1832. He succeeded as lieutenant-colonel commandant of the regiment on 10 April 1833 and commanded it until his death, having served more than 40 years, over 20 of them in command. After his death the regiment erected a memorial to him in Lichfield Cathedral.

=== Gambling ===
Anson was also known for his excessive gambling and lavish entertaining at his Shugborough Hall seat. He also purchased the estate at nearby Ranton, Staffordshire, where he built Abbey House and developed the estate into a great sporting centre. However, his extravagant lifestyle and gambling put him and the family into debts of £600,000 and led to Anson's financial collapse in 1842. The entire contents of Shugborough Hall were sold off to pay for the debts. Abbey House at Ranton burned down in 1942. The ivy-covered ruins can still be seen.

== Personal life ==
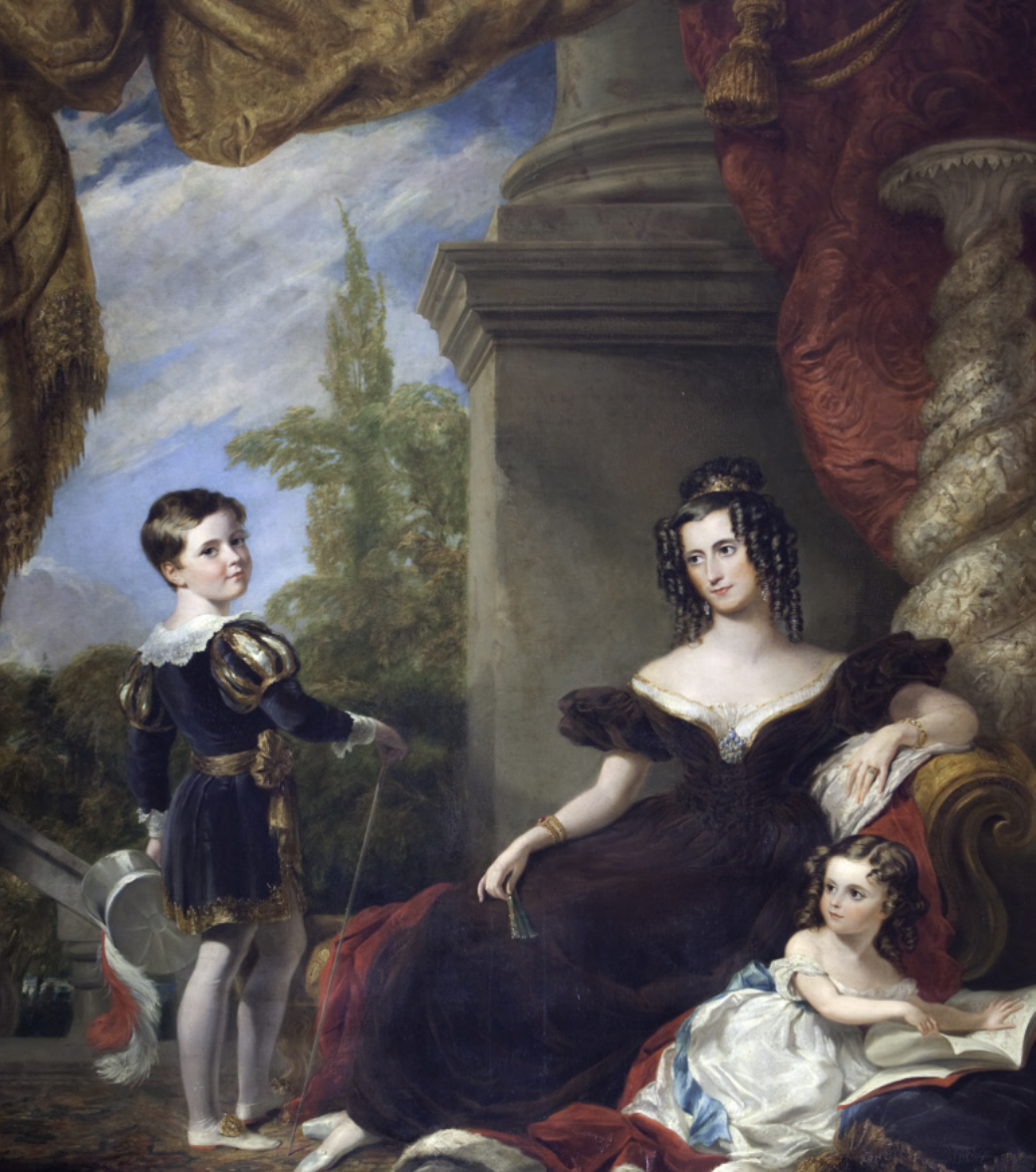
Louisa Philips, Countess of Lichfield (1800–1879) with two of her children by Sir George Hayter 1832

Lord Lichfield married Louisa Catherine, daughter of Nathaniel Philips, in 1819. They had four sons and four daughters, being:

- Lady Louisa Mary Ann Anson (1819–1882), who married Lt.-Col. Edward King-Tenison (d. 1878) of Kilronan Castle, in 1838 and had issue.
- Lady Anne Frederica Anson (1823–1896), who married Francis Charteris, 10th Earl of Wemyss, in 1843 and had issue.
- Thomas George Anson, 2nd Earl of Lichfield (1825–1892)
- Lady Harriet Frances Maria Anson (1827–1898), who married Augustus Venables-Vernon, 6th Baron Vernon, in 1851 and had issue.
- Hon. William Victor Leopold Horatio Anson (1833–1856)
- Lt.-Col. Hon. Augustus Henry Archibald Anson (1835–1877), a soldier who received the Victoria Cross for service during the Indian Mutiny of 1857, he later served as member of parliament for Lichfield. In 1863, he married Amelia Maria Claughton (1844–1894), eldest daughter of the Rt. Rev. Thomas Legh Claughton, Bishop of St Albans, by the former Hon. Julia Susanna Ward (eldest daughter of William Humble Ward, 10th Baron Ward) and sister of Sir Gilbert Henry Claughton, 1st Baronet. They did not have children. After Anson's death, his widow married, as his second wife, George Campbell, 8th Duke of Argyll in 1881.
- Lady Gwendoline Isabella Anna Maria Anson (1837–1912), who married 19 Apr 1865 Nicholas Power O'Shee, of Gardenmorris, co. Waterford (d. 30 Mar 1902), and had issue.
- Rt. Rev. Hon. Adelbert John Robert Anson, a clergyman who served as Bishop of Qu'Apelle in Canada (1840–1909).

Lord Lichfield died at his townhouse at 2 Stanhope Street in Mayfair, aged 58, and is buried at St Michael and All Angels Church in Colwich, a short distance from Shugborough Hall. He was succeeded in the earldom by his eldest son, Thomas. Lady Lichfield survived him by over 25 years and died in August 1879.

== See also ==
- Ranton, Staffordshire
- Shugborough Hall

Parliament of the United Kingdom
Preceded by Edmund Knowles Lacon; William Loftus	Member of Parliament for Great Yarmouth; 1818–1819; With: Charles Edmund Rumbold	Succeeded by Charles Rumbold; Hon. George Anson
Political offices
Preceded by The Lord Maryborough	Master of the Buckhounds; 1830–1834	Succeeded by The Earl of Chesterfield
Preceded by The Marquess Conyngham	Postmaster General; 1835–1841	Succeeded by Viscount Lowther
Military offices
Preceded by Edward Littleton	Lieutenant-Colonel Commandant, Staffordshire Yeomanry; 1833–1854	Succeeded by Lord Bagot
Peerage of the United Kingdom
New creation	Earl of Lichfield; 1831–1854	Succeeded by Thomas Anson
Preceded by Thomas Anson	Viscount Anson; 1818–1854	Succeeded by Thomas Anson
