= North Norfolk (constituency) =

Parliamentary constituency in the United Kingdom, 1868 onwards

Coordinates: 52.89°N 1.17°E

- County constituency for the House of Commons
- Interactive map of boundaries since 2024
- Location within the East of England
- County: Norfolk
- Electorate: 70,719 (March 2020)
- Major settlements: Cromer, North Walsham, Sheringham, Wells-next-the-Sea

Current constituency
- Created: 1868
- Member of Parliament: Steffan Aquarone (Liberal Democrats)
- Seats: 1868–1885: Two; 1885 onwards: One
- Created from: West Norfolk; East Norfolk

North Norfolk is a constituency (Note: A county constituency (for the purposes of election expenses and type of returning officer)) represented in the House of Commons of the UK Parliament since 2024 by Steffan Aquarone, a Liberal Democrat. (Note: As with all constituencies, the constituency elects one Member of Parliament (MP) by the first past the post system of election at least every five years.)

== Constituency profile ==
North Norfolk is a constituency in Norfolk in the East of England, covering most of the local government district of the same name. Its largest town is North Walsham, which has a population of around 13,000. Other settlements include the towns of Cromer, Holt, Sheringham, Stalham and Wells-next-the-Sea and the villages of Mundesley and Hoveton.

North Norfolk is a large, rural constituency covering much of Norfolk's coast, with many small market towns and villages. The coastal settlements were traditionally reliant on the fishing industry and today are seaside resorts; Cromer in particular is popular with tourists and there are numerous holiday parks in the area. The Broads, an area of navigable rivers and lakes with national park status, extends into the east of the constituency near Stalham. Most of the constituency's towns have average or below-average levels of wealth, although Sheringham is more affluent. House prices across the constituency are in line with the UK average but generally lower than the rest of the East of England.

North Norfolk has a very large retired population and a low proportion of young adults; around 36% of residents are over the age of 65, almost double the UK-wide figure. In general, residents have low levels of education, high rates of homeownership and are more likely to be religious compared to the rest of the country. Household income is low and the child poverty rate is above average. A high proportion of residents work in the agriculture, retail and tourism sectors and the percentage claiming unemployment benefits is below average. White people made up 98% of the population at the 2021 census.

Most of the constituency is represented by Liberal Democrats at the local council level with some Conservatives elected in the east around Stalham. An estimated 59% of voters in North Norfolk supported leaving the European Union in the 2016 referendum, higher than the UK-wide figure of 52%.

== History ==
The North Division of Norfolk was first created by the Reform Act 1867 as one of three two-member divisions of the Parliamentary County of Norfolk. Under the Redistribution of Seats Act 1885, the three two-member county divisions were replaced with six single-member divisions. The second version of this constituency was one of the single-member seats. It has remained as a single-member seat since then, being designated as a County Constituency from the 1950 general election.

Formerly held by Labour from 1945 to 1970, then the Conservatives from 1970 to 2001, the seat was represented by the Liberal Democrat Norman Lamb from 2001 until he stood down for the 2019 general election, when the Conservatives regained the seat from the Lib Dems with a swing of 17.5%. However, the Lib Dems re-took the seat at the following general election in 2024 with a swing of 16.8%.

The 2001 general election marked the first time that a Liberal-aligned candidate had won a seat in Norfolk since 1929. This was to be followed by the election of Simon Wright in Norwich South in 2010. While Wright's success was short-lived (he was defeated in 2015), Lamb retained his seat, which at the 2015 election was one of only two Liberal Democrat seats in southern England, and one of only eight in the whole UK. At the 2017 general election, in which the Liberal Democrats lost five of their nine seats, North Norfolk was one of the four held. Although the seat had been held by Labour for the 25 years following the Second World War, Labour has slumped to a distant third in recent years, and came fourth in 2015, and last in a narrower field of three candidates in 2017.

North Norfolk was described by the Earl of Leicester as "the one constituency in England where, in 1964, it was so feudal that it had to be explained to the electors that the ballot was secret." Feudal is used as a metaphor, or shorthand, meaning constitutionally backward.

== Boundaries and boundary changes ==
=== Historic ===
==== 1868–1885 ====
- The Hundreds of East Flegg, West Flegg, Happing, Tunstead, Erpingham (North), Erpingham (South), Eynsford, Holt and North Greenhoe.

The seat was formed largely from northern parts of the abolished Eastern Division, with a small part transferred from the Western Division. It also absorbed the Parliamentary Borough of Great Yarmouth, which had been disenfranchised for corruption under the Act.

==== 1885–1918 ====
- The Sessional Divisions of Eynsford, Holt, North Erpingham, and North Greenhoe; and
- Part of the Sessional Division of South Erpingham.

Great Yarmouth re-established as a single-member Parliamentary Borough. Eastern parts were transferred to the re-established Eastern Division.

==== 1918–1950 ====
- The Urban Districts of Cromer, Sheringham, and Wells-next-the-Sea; and
- The Rural Districts of Aylsham, Erpingham, and Walsingham.

Gained the area around Fakenham from the abolished North-Western Division, and lost small areas in the south to the Eastern and South-Western Divisions.

==== 1950–1974 ====
- The Urban Districts of Cromer, North Walsham, Sheringham, and Wells-next-the-Sea; and
- The Rural Districts of Erpingham, Smallburgh, and Walsingham.

Gained North Walsham and the Rural District of Smallburgh from the abolished Eastern Division. An area comprising the former Rural District of Aylsham (now part of the St Faith's and Aylsham Rural District) was transferred to the new constituency of Central Norfolk.

==== 1974–1983 ====
- The Urban Districts of Cromer, North Walsham, and Sheringham; and
- The Rural Districts of Erpingham, St Faith's and Aylsham, and Smallburgh.

Gained the Rural District of St Faiths and Aylsham, including Hellesdon and Sprowston, from the now abolished constituency of Central Norfolk. Wells-next-the-Sea and the Rural District of Walsingham, including Fakenham, were transferred to the re-established constituency of North West Norfolk.

==== 1983–2010 ====
- The District of North Norfolk.

The seat was extended westwards, regaining Wells-next-the-Sea and areas comprising the former Rural District of Walsingham, including Fakenham, from North West Norfolk. Suburbs of Norwich, including Hellesdon and Sprowston, were transferred to Norwich North, and remaining southern areas, including Aylsham, to the new constituency of Mid Norfolk.

Map of boundaries 2010-2024

==== 2010–2024 ====
- The District of North Norfolk wards of Briston, Chaucer, Corpusty, Cromer Town, Erpingham, Gaunt, Glaven Valley, Happisburgh, High Heath, Holt, Hoveton, Mundesley, North Walsham East, North Walsham North, North Walsham West, Poppyland, Priory, Roughton, St Benet, Scottow, Sheringham North, Sheringham South, Stalham and Sutton, Suffield Park, The Runtons, Waterside, Waxham, and Worstead.

Fakenham and surrounding areas were transferred out once again to the new constituency of Broadland.

=== Current ===
Further to the 2023 review of Westminster constituencies, which came into effect for the 2024 general election, the composition of the constituency is as follows (as they existed on 1 December 2020):

- The District of North Norfolk wards of: Bacton; Beeston Regis & The Runtons; Briston; Coastal; Cromer Town; Erpingham; Gresham; Happisburgh; Hickling; Holt; Hoveton & Tunstead; Mundesley; North Walsham East; North Walsham Market Cross; North Walsham West; Poppyland; Priory; Roughton; St. Benet’s; Sheringham North; Sheringham South; Stalham; Stody; Suffield Park; Trunch; Wells with Holkham; Worstead.

Minor gain following changes to local authority ward boundaries.

== Members of Parliament ==
=== MPs 1868–1885 ===
West Norfolk and East Norfolk prior to 1868

Election	First member	First party	Second member	Second party
1868	constituency created			
1868	Frederick Walpole	Conservative	Sir Edmund Lacon	Conservative
1876 by-election	James Duff	Conservative	Sir Edmund Lacon	Conservative
1879 by-election	Edward Birkbeck	Conservative	Sir Edmund Lacon	Conservative
1885	reduced to one member			

=== MPs since 1885 ===
Election	Member	Party
1885	Herbert Cozens-Hardy	Liberal
1899 by-election	William Brampton Gurdon	Liberal
Jan 1910	Noel Buxton	Liberal
1918	Douglas King	Coalition Independent
1920	Douglas King	Coalition Conservative
1922	Noel Buxton	Labour
1930 by-election	Lady Noel-Buxton	Labour
1931	Thomas Cook	Conservative
1945	Edwin Gooch	Labour
1964	Bert Hazell	Labour
1970	Ralph Howell	Conservative
1997	David Prior	Conservative
2001	Sir Norman Lamb	Liberal Democrats
2019	Duncan Baker	Conservative
2024	Steffan Aquarone	Liberal Democrats

== Elections ==
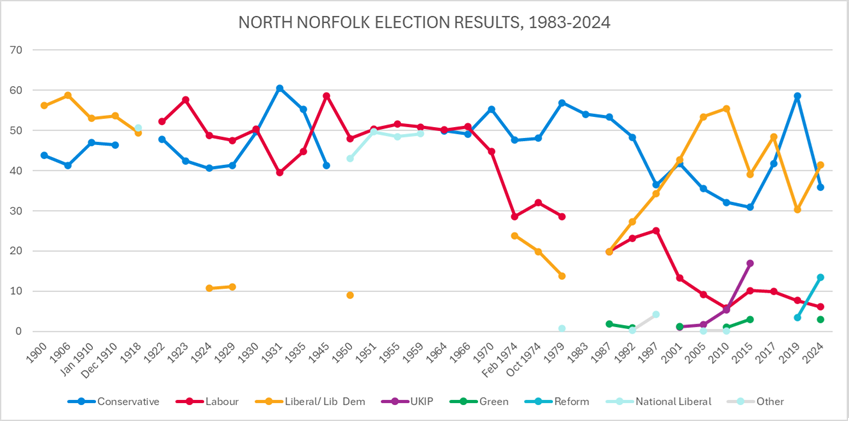
Election results 1900-2024

=== Elections in the 2020s ===
General election 2024: North Norfolk
Party	Candidate	Votes	%	±%
Liberal Democrats	Steffan Aquarone	19,488	41.4	+11.0
Conservative	Duncan Baker	16,903	35.9	−22.6
Reform	Jason Patchett	6,368	13.5	+10.1
Labour	Cathy Cordiner-Achenbach	2,878	6.1	−1.6
Green	Liz Dixon	1,406	3.0	+2.9
Majority		2,585	5.5	N/A
Turnout		47,043	65.9	–7.0
Registered electors		71,438		
Liberal Democrats gain from Conservative		Swing	▲16.8	

=== Elections in the 2010s ===
2019 notional result
Party	Vote	%
Conservative	30,145	58.5
Liberal Democrats	15,653	30.4
Labour	3,980	7.7
Brexit Party	1,739	3.4
Green	45	0.1
Turnout	51,562	72.9
Electorate	70,719	

General election 2019: North Norfolk
Party	Candidate	Votes	%	±%
Conservative	Duncan Baker	29,792	58.6	+16.9
Liberal Democrats	Karen Ward	15,397	30.3	−18.1
Labour	Emma Corlett	3,895	7.7	−2.2
Brexit Party	Harry Gwynne	1,739	3.4	N/A
Majority		14,395	28.3	N/A
Turnout		50,823	71.9	−3.4
Conservative gain from Liberal Democrats		Swing	+17.5	

Sir Norman Lamb did not stand for re-election. The seat saw the largest decrease in the Liberal Democrat vote share at the 2019 general election, and the third highest increase in vote share for the Conservatives.

General election 2017: North Norfolk
Party	Candidate	Votes	%	±%
Liberal Democrats	Norman Lamb	25,260	48.4	+9.3
Conservative	James Wild	21,748	41.7	+10.8
Labour	Stephen Burke	5,180	9.9	−0.3
Majority		3,512	6.7	−1.5
Turnout		52,188	75.3	+3.6
Liberal Democrats hold		Swing	-0.8	

General election 2015: North Norfolk
Party	Candidate	Votes	%	±%
Liberal Democrats	Norman Lamb	19,299	39.1	−16.4
Conservative	Ann Steward	15,256	30.9	−1.2
UKIP	Michael Baker	8,328	16.9	+11.5
Labour	Denise Burke	5,043	10.2	+4.4
Green	Mike Macartney-Filgate	1,488	3.0	+2.0
Majority		4,043	8.2	−15.2
Turnout		49,414	71.7	−1.5
Liberal Democrats hold		Swing	-7.6	

General election 2010: North Norfolk
Party	Candidate	Votes	%	±%
Liberal Democrats	Norman Lamb	27,554	55.5	+2.3
Conservative	Trevor Ivory	15,928	32.1	−3.9
Labour	Phil Harris	2,896	5.8	−3.1
UKIP	Michael Baker	2,680	5.4	+3.7
Green	Andrew Boswell	508	1.0	N/A
Independent	Simon Mann	95	0.2	N/A
Majority		11,626	23.4	+5.4
Turnout		49,661	73.2	+0.5
Liberal Democrats hold		Swing	+3.1	

=== Elections in the 2000s ===
General election 2005: North Norfolk
Party	Candidate	Votes	%	±%
Liberal Democrats	Norman Lamb	31,515	53.4	+10.7
Conservative	Iain Dale	20,909	35.5	−6.3
Labour	Phil Harris	5,447	9.2	−4.1
UKIP	Stuart Agnew	978	1.7	+0.6
Independent	Justin Appleyard	116	0.2	N/A
Majority		10,606	17.9	+17.0
Turnout		58,965	73.0	+2.8
Liberal Democrats hold		Swing	+8.5	

General election 2001: North Norfolk
Party	Candidate	Votes	%	±%
Liberal Democrats	Norman Lamb	23,978	42.7	+8.4
Conservative	David Prior	23,495	41.8	+5.3
Labour	Mike Gates	7,490	13.3	−11.8
Green	Mike Sheridan	649	1.2	N/A
UKIP	Paul Simison	608	1.1	N/A
Majority		483	0.9	N/A
Turnout		56,220	70.2	−5.8
Liberal Democrats gain from Conservative		Swing	+1.5	

=== Elections in the 1990s ===
General election 1997: North Norfolk
Party	Candidate	Votes	%	±%
Conservative	David Prior	21,456	36.5	−11.8
Liberal Democrats	Norman Lamb	20,163	34.3	+7.0
Labour	Michael Cullingham	14,736	25.1	+1.9
Referendum	John Allen	2,458	4.2	N/A
Majority		1,293	2.2	−18.8
Turnout		58,813	76.0	−4.8
Conservative hold		Swing	-9.5	

General election 1992: North Norfolk
Party	Candidate	Votes	%	±%
Conservative	Ralph Howell	28,810	48.3	−5.0
Liberal Democrats	Norman Lamb	16,265	27.3	+2.3
Labour	Michael Cullingham	13,850	23.2	+3.3
Green	Angie Zelter	559	0.9	−0.8
Natural Law	S. Jackson	167	0.3	N/A
Majority		12,545	21.0	−7.3
Turnout		59,651	80.8	+3.3
Conservative hold		Swing	-3.6	

=== Elections in the 1980s ===
General election 1987: North Norfolk
Party	Candidate	Votes	%	±%
Conservative	Ralph Howell	28,822	53.3	−0.7
Alliance	Neil Anthony	13,512	25.0	−1.8
Labour	Anthony Earle	10,765	19.9	+0.7
Green	Michael Filgate	960	1.8	N/A
Majority		15,310	28.3	+1.1
Turnout		54,059	77.5	+2.9
Conservative hold		Swing	+0.5	

General election 1983: North Norfolk
Party	Candidate	Votes	%	±%
Conservative	Ralph Howell	26,230	54.0	−2.9
Alliance	John Elworthy	13,007	26.8	+13.0
Labour	Edward Barber	9,317	19.2	−9.4
Majority		13,223	27.2	−1.1
Turnout		48,554	74.6	−4.1
Conservative hold		Swing		

=== Elections in the 1970s ===
General election 1979: North Norfolk
Party	Candidate	Votes	%	±%
Conservative	Ralph Howell	43,952	56.9	+8.8
Labour	R. S. Dimmick	22,126	28.6	−3.4
Liberal	Gustav Rex Collings	10,643	13.8	−6.1
National Front	A. C. R. Sizeland	548	0.7	N/A
Majority		21,826	28.3	+12.2
Turnout		72,269	78.7	+2.2
Conservative hold		Swing	+6.1	

General election October 1974: North Norfolk
Party	Candidate	Votes	%	±%
Conservative	Ralph Howell	33,312	48.1	+0.5
Labour	D. M. Mason	22,191	32.0	+3.4
Liberal	Richard Moore	13,776	19.9	−3.9
Majority		11,121	16.1	−2.9
Turnout		69,279	76.5	−6.9
Conservative hold		Swing	−3.6	

General election February 1974: North Norfolk
Party	Candidate	Votes	%	±%
Conservative	Ralph Howell	35,684	47.6	−7.7
Labour	D. M. Mason	21,394	28.6	−16.1
Liberal	Richard Moore	17,853	23.8	N/A
Majority		14,290	19.0	+8.4
Turnout		74,931	83.4	+3.1
Conservative hold		Swing	+4.2	

General election 1970: North Norfolk
Party	Candidate	Votes	%	±%
Conservative	Ralph Howell	24,587	55.3	+6.2
Labour	Bert Hazell	19,903	44.7	−6.2
Majority		4,684	10.6	N/A
Turnout		44,490	80.3	−2.9
Conservative gain from Labour		Swing	+6.2	

=== Elections in the 1960s ===
General election 1966: North Norfolk
Party	Candidate	Votes	%	±%
Labour	Bert Hazell	20,796	50.90	
Conservative	Ralph Howell	20,059	49.10	
Majority		737	1.80	
Turnout		40,855	83.19	
Labour hold		Swing		

General election 1964: North Norfolk
Party	Candidate	Votes	%	±%
Labour	Bert Hazell	19,360	50.1	−0.7
Conservative	Frank Henry Easton	19,307	49.9	+0.8
Majority		53	0.2	−1.5
Turnout		38,667	79.7	−0.1
Labour hold		Swing		

=== Elections in the 1950s ===
General election 1959: North Norfolk
Party	Candidate	Votes	%	±%
Labour	Edwin Gooch	19,784	50.85	
National Liberal	Frank Henry Easton	19,126	49.15	
Majority		658	1.70	
Turnout		38,910	79.81	
Labour hold		Swing		

General election 1955: North Norfolk
Party	Candidate	Votes	%	±%
Labour	Edwin Gooch	20,899	51.53	
National Liberal	William Scarlett Jameson	19,657	48.47	
Majority		1,242	3.06	
Turnout		40,556	81.64	
Labour hold		Swing		

General election 1951: North Norfolk
Party	Candidate	Votes	%	±%
Labour	Edwin Gooch	21,067	50.33	
National Liberal	Douglas M. Reid	20,788	49.67	
Majority		279	0.66	
Turnout		41,855	83.66	
Labour hold		Swing		

General election 1950: North Norfolk
Party	Candidate	Votes	%	±%
Labour	Edwin Gooch	19,790	47.99	
National Liberal	Douglas M. Reid	17,741	43.03	
Liberal	Arnold Hilward Jones	3,703	8.98	N/A
Majority		2,049	4.96	
Turnout		41,234	84.31	
Labour hold		Swing		

=== Election in the 1940s ===
General election 1945: North Norfolk
Party	Candidate	Votes	%	±%
Labour	Edwin Gooch	17,753	58.67	
Conservative	Thomas Cook	12,507	41.33	
Majority		5,246	17.34	N/A
Turnout		30,260	70.94	
Labour gain from Conservative		Swing		

=== Elections in the 1930s ===
General election 1935: North Norfolk
Party	Candidate	Votes	%	±%
Conservative	Thomas Cook	17,863	55.26	
Labour	Lucy Noel-Buxton	14,465	44.74	
Majority		3,398	10.52	
Turnout		32,328	78.14	
Conservative hold		Swing		

General election 1931: North Norfolk
Party	Candidate	Votes	%	±%
Conservative	Thomas Cook	19,988	60.53	
Labour	Lucy Noel-Buxton	13,035	39.47	
Majority		6,953	21.06	N/A
Turnout		33,023	82.27	
Conservative gain from Labour		Swing		

1930 North Norfolk by-election
Party	Candidate	Votes	%	±%
Labour	Lucy Noel-Buxton	14,821	50.3	+2.8
Conservative	Thomas Cook	14,642	49.7	+8.4
Majority		179	0.6	−5.6
Turnout		29,463	75.0	−2.9
Labour hold		Swing	-2.8	

=== Elections in the 1920s ===
General election 1929: North Norfolk
Party	Candidate	Votes	%	±%
Labour	Noel Buxton	14,544	47.5	−1.2
Unionist	Thomas Cook	12,661	41.3	+0.7
Liberal	Zelia Hoffman	3,407	11.1	+0.4
Majority		1,883	6.2	−1.9
Turnout		30,612	77.9	+0.8
Registered electors		39,272		
Labour hold		Swing	−1.0	

General election 1924: North Norfolk
Party	Candidate	Votes	%	±%
Labour	Noel Buxton	11,978	48.7	−8.9
Unionist	Thomas Cook	9,974	40.6	−1.8
Liberal	Maurice Alexander	2,637	10.7	N/A
Majority		2,004	8.1	−7.1
Turnout		24,589	77.1	+8.8
Registered electors		31,913		
Labour hold		Swing	−3.6	

General election 1923: North Norfolk
Party	Candidate	Votes	%	±%
Labour	Noel Buxton	12,278	57.6	+5.4
Unionist	Brian Smith	9,022	42.4	−5.4
Majority		3,256	15.2	+10.8
Turnout		21,300	68.3	−6.9
Registered electors		31,205		
Labour hold		Swing	+5.4	

General election 1922: North Norfolk
Party	Candidate	Votes	%	±%
Labour	Noel Buxton	12,004	52.2	+2.8
Unionist	Roger Bowan Crewdson	10,975	47.8	N/A
Majority		1,029	4.4	N/A
Turnout		22,979	75.2	+14.4
Registered electors		30,556		
Labour gain from Independent		Swing		

=== Elections in the 1910s ===
General election 1918: North Norfolk
Party		Candidate	Votes	%	±%
C	Independent	Douglas King*	9,274	50.6	+3.8
	Liberal	Noel Buxton	9,061	49.4	−3.8
Majority			213	1.2	N/A
Turnout			18,335	60.8	−25.9
Registered electors			30,179		
	Independent gain from Liberal		Swing	+3.8	
C indicates candidate endorsed by the coalition government.

* King was named a Unionist candidate in the official list of Coalition Government endorsements, but he wrote to The Times stating he had left the party before the election and should be classed as an independent. He later rejoined the party.

General election 1914–15: Another general election was required to take place before the end of 1915. The political parties had been making preparations for an election to take place and by July 1914, the following candidates had been selected;

- Liberal: Noel Buxton
- Unionist: Douglas King

Buxton

General election December 1910: North Norfolk
Party	Candidate	Votes	%	±%
Liberal	Noel Buxton	5,187	53.6	+0.6
Conservative	Douglas King	4,491	46.4	−0.6
Majority		696	7.2	+1.2
Turnout		9,678	86.7	−1.0
Registered electors		11,169		
Liberal hold		Swing	+0.6	

General election January 1910: North Norfolk
Party	Candidate	Votes	%	±%
Liberal	Noel Buxton	5,189	53.0	−5.7
Conservative	Douglas King	4,604	47.0	+5.7
Majority		585	6.0	−11.4
Turnout		9,793	87.7	+6.3
Registered electors		11,169		
Liberal hold		Swing	−5.7	

=== Elections in the 1900s ===
1906 general election: North Norfolk
Party	Candidate	Votes	%	±%
Liberal	William Brampton Gurdon	5,155	58.7	+2.5
Conservative	F. T. S. Rippingall	3,628	41.3	−2.5
Majority		1,527	17.4	+5.0
Turnout		8,783	81.4	+3.6
Registered electors		10,795		
Liberal hold		Swing	+2.5	

1900 general election: North Norfolk
Party	Candidate	Votes	%	±%
Liberal	William Brampton Gurdon	4,490	56.2	+3.0
Conservative	Henry Spencer Follett	3,493	43.8	−3.0
Majority		997	12.4	+6.0
Turnout		7,983	77.8	−2.7
Registered electors		10,261		
Liberal hold		Swing	+3.0	

=== Elections in the 1890s ===
1899 North Norfolk by-election
Party	Candidate	Votes	%	±%
Liberal	William Brampton Gurdon	4,775	57.0	+3.8
Conservative	Kenneth Kemp	3,610	43.0	−3.8
Majority		1,165	14.0	+7.6
Turnout		8,385	83.7	+3.2
Registered electors		10,017		
Liberal hold		Swing	+3.8	

- Caused by Cozens-Hardy's appointment as a judge in the Chancery Division of the High Court of Justice.

Cozens-Hardy

1895 general election: North Norfolk
Party	Candidate	Votes	%	±%
Liberal	Herbert Cozens-Hardy	4,246	53.2	−5.0
Conservative	Kenneth Kemp	3,738	46.8	+5.0
Majority		508	6.4	−10.0
Turnout		7,984	80.5	−9.5
Registered electors		9,924		
Liberal hold		Swing	−5.0	

1892 general election: North Norfolk
Party	Candidate	Votes	%	±%
Liberal	Herbert Cozens-Hardy	4,561	58.2	+3.1
Conservative	John Cator	3,278	41.8	−3.1
Majority		1,283	16.4	+6.2
Turnout		7,839	90.0	+14.0
Registered electors		8,713		
Liberal hold		Swing	+3.1	

=== Elections in the 1880s ===
1886 general election: North Norfolk
Party	Candidate	Votes	%	±%
Liberal	Herbert Cozens-Hardy	4,084	55.1	−5.0
Conservative	Ailwyn Fellowes	3,324	44.9	+5.0
Majority		760	10.2	−10.0
Turnout		7,408	76.0	−9.9
Registered electors		9,742		
Liberal hold		Swing	−5.0	

Hoare

1885 general election: North Norfolk
Party	Candidate	Votes	%	±%
Liberal	Herbert Cozens-Hardy	5,028	60.1	N/A
Conservative	Samuel Hoare	3,342	39.9	N/A
Majority		1,686	20.2	N/A
Turnout		8,370	85.9	N/A
Registered electors		9,742		
Liberal gain from Conservative		Swing	N/A	

1880 general election: North Norfolk (2 seats)
Party	Candidate	Votes	%	±%
Conservative	Edward Birkbeck	Unopposed		
Conservative	Edmund Lacon	Unopposed		
Registered electors		6,519		
Conservative hold				
Conservative hold				

=== Elections in the 1870s ===
1879 by-election: North Norfolk (1 seat)
Party	Candidate	Votes	%	±%
Conservative	Edward Birkbeck	2,742	54.9	N/A
Liberal	Thomas Buxton	2,252	45.1	N/A
Majority		490	9.8	N/A
Turnout		4,994	77.1	N/A
Registered electors		6,474		
Conservative hold				

- Caused by Duff's death.

1876 by-election: North Norfolk (1 seat)
Party	Candidate	Votes	%	±%
Conservative	James Duff	2,302	51.2	N/A
Liberal	Thomas Buxton	2,192	48.8	N/A
Majority		110	2.4	N/A
Turnout		4,494	72.1	N/A
Registered electors		6,231		
Conservative hold				

- Caused by Walpole's death.

1874 general election: North Norfolk (2 seats)
Party	Candidate	Votes	%	±%
Conservative	Frederick Walpole	Unopposed		
Conservative	Edmund Lacon	Unopposed		
Registered electors		6,325		
Conservative hold				
Conservative hold				

=== Elections in the 1860s ===
1868 general election: North Norfolk (2 seats)
Party	Candidate	Votes	%	±%
Conservative	Frederick Walpole	2,630	27.7	
Conservative	Edmund Lacon	2,563	27.0	
Liberal	Edmond Wodehouse	2,235	23.5	
Liberal	Robert Gurdon	2,078	21.9	
Majority		328	3.5	
Turnout		4,753 (est)	73.9 (est)	
Registered electors		6,432		
Conservative win (new seat)				
Conservative win (new seat)				

== See also ==
- List of parliamentary constituencies in Norfolk
- List of parliamentary constituencies in the East of England (region)

== Sources ==
- Iain Dale, ed. (2003). The Times House of Commons 1929, 1931, 1935. Politico's (reprint). ISBN 978-1-84275-033-9.
- The Times House of Commons 1945. The Times. 1945.
- The Times House of Commons 1950. The Times. 1950.
- The Times House of Commons 1955. The Times. 1955.
