= Duncan Baker =

British Conservative politician

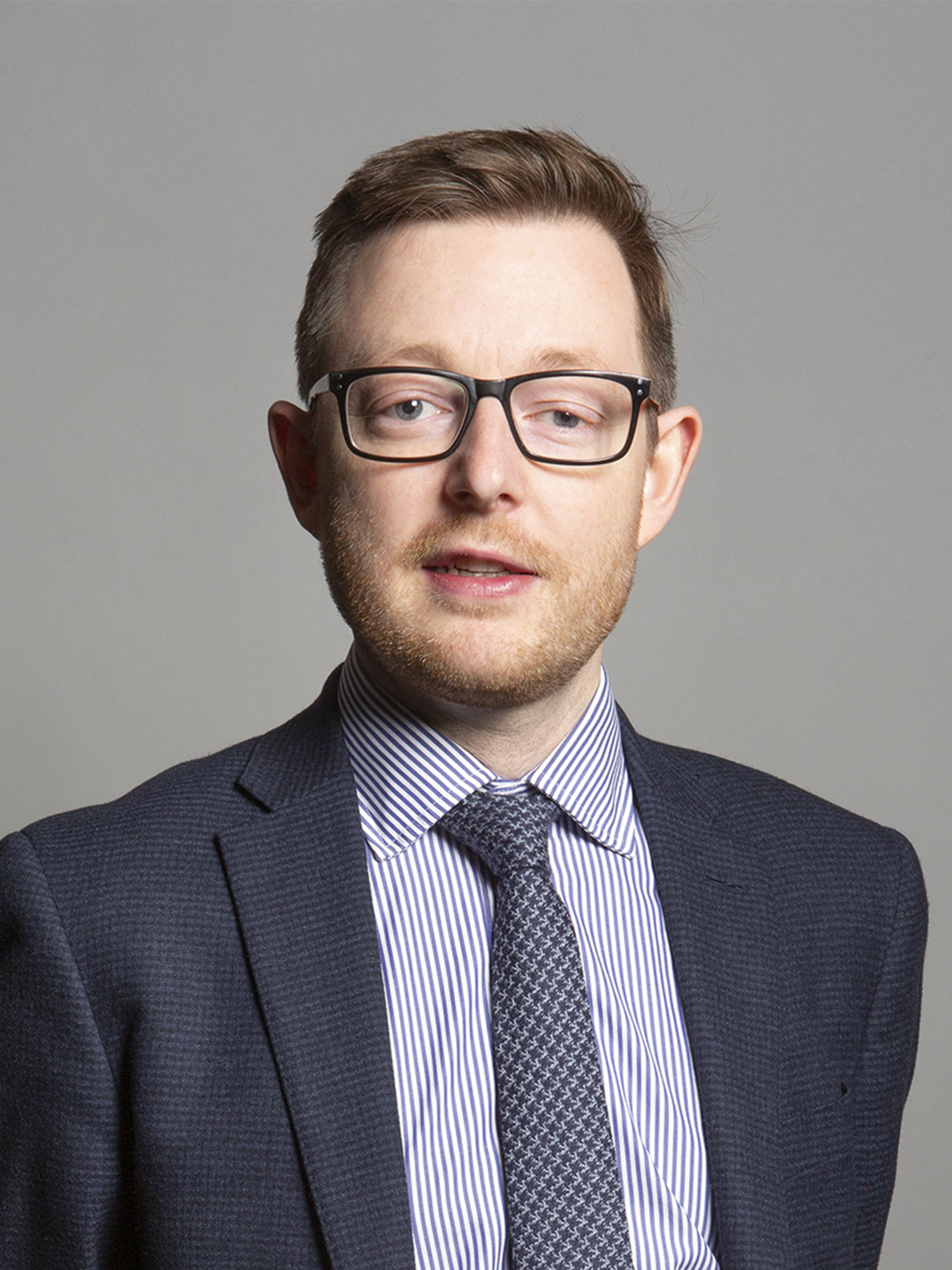
- Official portrait, 2019

Member of Parliament for North Norfolk
- In office 12 December 2019 – 30 May 2024
- Preceded by: Norman Lamb
- Succeeded by: Steffan Aquarone

Personal details
- Born: Duncan Charles Baker; 15 November 1979 (age 46) Norfolk, England
- Party: Conservative (2016–present)
- Other political affiliations: UKIP (before 2016)
- Spouse: Nina
- Children: 2 (Isabelle and Eleanor)
- Education: Nottingham Trent University
- Website: www.duncanbaker.org.uk

Duncan Charles Baker (born 15 November 1979) is a British Conservative Party politician, who served as the Member of Parliament (MP) for North Norfolk from 2019 until 2024.

== Early life and career ==
Duncan Baker was born on 15 November 1979 in Norfolk, and went to Gresham's, a private school in Holt. He studied business at Nottingham Trent University, then qualified as a chartered accountant, before working as a finance director.

== Political career ==
Baker ran for election to North Norfolk District Council in 2015, standing for UKIP in the Holt ward, which had previously been his step-father Michael's seat. He received 714 votes and was not elected. He was elected to the same ward as a Conservative in a 2017 by-election, gaining the seat from the Liberal Democrats with 724 votes.

He became Conservative group leader in North Norfolk in May 2019. On election as an MP, he stood down from this position and was replaced by Christopher Cushing as group leader.

== Parliamentary career ==
At the 2019 general election, Baker was elected to Parliament as the Conservative MP for North Norfolk with 58.6% of the vote and a majority of 14,395.

Baker's record in the Parliamentary Register of Members' Interests shows that he has received indirect financial support from Thomas Coke, 8th Earl of Leicester, whose Holkham estate is in the constituency.

Baker was appointed Parliamentary Private Secretary to the Department for Levelling Up, Housing and Communities in February 2022. He resigned on 6 July 2022, in protest at Boris Johnson's conduct in the Chris Pincher scandal.

== Personal life ==
He lives in North Norfolk and is married to Nina. He is a father of two daughters, Isabelle and Eleanor.

Parliament of the United Kingdom
Preceded by Norman Lamb	Member of Parliament for North Norfolk; 2019–2024	Succeeded by Steffan Aquarone
