= Joseph Sandars =

Joseph Sandars (1785-1860) was a wealthy corn merchant based in Liverpool, UK. He played a major role in initiating development of the groundbreaking Liverpool & Manchester Railway which opened in 1830.

== Early life ==
Sandars' father, also called Joseph, was a corn merchant who moved to Derby from Mackworth. His mother was born Elizabeth Blakeman. He had two siblings, the twins Samuel and Elizabeth. In family trees Joseph Sandars is often referred to as Joseph Sandars of Taplow House, Buckinghamshire, where he lived in later years.

== Move to Liverpool ==
Sandars entered his father's trade but at the age of 20 moved to Liverpool where he continued as a corn merchant. He traded in a partnership, firstly as Sandars & Blain and from 1826 when the partnership split up, as Sandars & Claxton and, in 1860, as Sandars & Smith. Sandars was a successful businessman as can be judged from his integration into the commercial life of Liverpool. Trade directories show that he was a member of several significant Liverpool committees, including the Corn Exchange committee, the Lyceum newsroom committee and the Norwich Union Fire Insurance Committee, all prior to the opening of the railway. His company kept detailed records of wheat yields from multiple regions and he subsequently gave testimony to parliamentary committees on crop yields and their economic consequences. He also testified during the inquiry into the affairs of Liverpool Corporation. Despite some misgivings, he asserted that "never was there an estate of such magnitude so fairly and honestly administered."

Sandars was a Quaker with Whig and Reform tendencies in common with many of his Liverpool contemporaries and, as with many local merchants, participated actively in the election of Liverpool's two MPs. However, in 1824 he resigned from the Liverpool Society for the Abolition of Slavery over concerns regarding the process of emancipation. His public letter led to a strong rebuttal in the Hull Rockingham newspaper. Many of Sandars' peers were also involved in the investigation of the young Liverpool woman Margaret M'Avoy about whom Sandars wrote a report "Hints to credulity" that was critical of claims that, although blind, she could read with the aid of her fingers.

Sandars was one of the wealthy merchants who in 1819 purchased 37 artworks from the estate of the bankrupt William Roscoe on behalf of the gallery of the Liverpool Royal Institution. The paintings ultimately formed the core of the Walker Art Gallery collection.

== Liverpool & Manchester Railway ==
As a merchant, Sandars was dissatisfied with the cost and speed of transport of goods between the port of Liverpool and the major industrial centre of Manchester. Movement of goods depended largely on canal and turnpike traffic at this time. Sandars met with engineer William James who was a major advocate for railways and he was convinced by James that a project should be established to connect the two burgeoning towns. James was contracted to survey the proposed line but failed to deliver the necessary reports in a timely fashion and was replaced as engineer in 1824 by George Stephenson. Sandars played a key role in compiling the prospectus for the railway and in assembling the committee that would eventually pilot the necessary legislation through parliament. He subsequently served as one of four deputy chairmen from 1824 and as a director from 1826. Sandars was director in charge of the locomotive Dart on the railway's opening on 15 September 1830.

== Later railway involvement ==
Sandars maintained an interest in railways and their application. He continued as a director when the Liverpool & Manchester Railway merged into the Grand Junction Railway in 1845 and later served on sub-committees of the London & North Western Railway formed after a further merger in 1846. While keeping a presence in Liverpool he also joined with Stephenson and others in developing mining and industrial interests elsewhere, first at Snibston in Leicestershire and subsequently at Clay Cross in Derbyshire.

== Portrait ==
Sandars is shown in a painting by Spiridione Gambardella along with George Stephenson and Charles Sylvester. The original artwork was destroyed by bombing in Liverpool during World War 2 and only monochrome photographs remain.

== Family and later life ==
During his time in Liverpool, Sandars lived in Pembroke Place. On 22 June 1812, he married Anna McKenzie Richards, of the same parish. His later years are poorly documented and his history readily confused with that of one of his sons, another Joseph Sandars, who became MP for Great Yarmouth in 1848-52 and was involved in the Clay Cross operations. Sandars' eldest son, William, died at the age of 17 in Frankfurt. He also had two daughters, Eliza Rose and Anna-Louisa. Eliza Rose married Birmingham magistrate Thomas Clement Sneyd-Kynnersley in June 1834. Anna-Louisa married in June 1843 to the Rev. Clement Francis Broughton, Rector of Norbury and Vicar of Uttoxeter. At the time of Anna-Louisa's marriage, Sandars lived in Johnstone (nowadays Johnson) Hall, Eccleshall, Staffordshire.

In 1851 Sandars moved to Taplow House in Taplow, Buckinghamshire (the house is now a hotel). He may also have had a London townhouse in Cleveland Row. Newspaper reports show that he attended the funeral of Robert Stephenson in 1859. Sandars himself died in London on 4 October 1860 and was buried at Taplow.
