= North Norfolk District Council elections =

Local government elections in Norfolk, England

North Norfolk District Council in Norfolk, England is elected every four years.

== Council composition ==
Composition of the council
Year	Conservative	Labour	Liberal Democrats (Note: Includes totals for the predecessors of the Liberal Democrats, the Liberal Party and SDP (both of which participated in the Alliance).)	UKIP	Independents & Others	Council control after election
Local government reorganisation; council established (47 seats)
1973	6	4	0	–	37	Independent
1976	7	1	0	–	39	Independent
New ward boundaries (46 seats)
1979	14	2	0	–	30	Independent
1983	14	2	1	–	29	Independent
1987	16	3	3	–	24	Independent
1991	17	6	5	–	18	No overall control
1995	4	19	12	0	11	No overall control
1999	14	10	12	0	10	No overall control
New ward boundaries (48 seats)
2003	14	0	28	0	6	Liberal Democrats
2007	16	0	30	0	2	Liberal Democrats
2011	28	0	18	1	1	Conservative
2015	33	0	15	0	0	Conservative
New ward boundaries (40 seats)
2019	6	0	30	0	4	Liberal Democrats
2023	12	0	25	0	3	Liberal Democrats

== Council elections ==
- 1973 Pastonacres District Council election
- 1976 North Norfolk District Council election
- 1979 North Norfolk District Council election (New ward boundaries)
- 1983 North Norfolk District Council election
- 1987 North Norfolk District Council election
- 1991 North Norfolk District Council election
- 1995 North Norfolk District Council election
- 1999 North Norfolk District Council election
- 2003 North Norfolk District Council election (New ward boundaries increased the number of councillors by 2)
- 2007 North Norfolk District Council election
- 2011 North Norfolk District Council election
- 2015 North Norfolk District Council election
- 2019 North Norfolk District Council election (New ward boundaries)
- 2023 North Norfolk District Council election

== Maps ==
1979 seat map

1983 seat map

1987 seat map

1991 seat map

1995 seat map

1999 seat map

2003 seat map

2007 seat map

2011 seat map

2015 seat map

2019 seat map

2023 seat map

== By-election results ==
=== 1995-1999 ===
Sheringham By-Election 25 September 1997
Party	Candidate	Votes	%	±%
Liberal Democrats	Brian Hannah	1,206	55.7	+10.4
Conservative		490	22.6	−3.9
Labour		263	12.1	−8.2
Independent		174	8.0	N/A
Green		32	1.5	N/A
Majority		716	33.1	
Turnout		2,165		
Liberal Democrats hold		Swing		

=== 1999-2003 ===
The Runtons By-Election 5 December 2002
Party	Candidate	Votes	%	±%
Liberal Democrats	Margaret Craske	745	58.4	+21.2
Conservative		484	37.9	−5.9
Labour		47	3.7	−12.0
Majority		261	20.5	
Turnout		1,276	48.7	
Liberal Democrats gain from Conservative		Swing		

=== 2003-2007 ===
Astley By-Election 10 July 2003
Party	Candidate	Votes	%	±%
Liberal Democrats	Robin Combe	441	51.5	+33.8
Conservative		346	40.4	+7.6
Independent		38	4.4	N/A
Labour		32	3.7	N/A
Majority		95	11.1	
Turnout		857	48.7	
Liberal Democrats gain from Independent		Swing		

Happisburgh By-Election 6 November 2003
Party	Candidate	Votes	%	±%
Liberal Democrats	Susan Stockton	619	61.0	+15.6
Conservative	James Croft	372	36.7	−8.0
Green	Rosemary Breame	24	2.4	−7.5
Majority		247	24.3	
Turnout		1,015	51.9	
Liberal Democrats hold		Swing		

St Benet By-Election 22 February 2005
Party	Candidate	Votes	%	±%
Liberal Democrats	Barbara McGoun	576	50.1	+35.6
Conservative	Christopher How	537	46.7	+2.1
Labour	David Spencer	36	3.1	N/A
Majority		39	3.4	
Turnout		1,149	65.0	
Liberal Democrats gain from Conservative		Swing		

Chaucer By-Election 8 September 2005
Party	Candidate	Votes	%	±%
Liberal Democrats	Anthea Sweeney	490	53.4	+4.2
Conservative	David Heathcote	395	43.1	−2.8
Labour	David Thompson	32	3.5	N/A
Majority		95	10.3	
Turnout		917	48.0	
Liberal Democrats hold		Swing		

Holt By-Election 7 June 2006
Party	Candidate	Votes	%	±%
Liberal Democrats	Philip High	885	56.6	+29.0
Conservative	John Blyth	637	40.8	+9.9
Labour	Desmond Hewitt	41	2.6	N/A
Majority		248	15.8	
Turnout		1,563	54.1	
Liberal Democrats hold		Swing		

=== 2007-2011 ===
North Walsham West By-Election 4 June 2009
Party	Candidate	Votes	%	±%
Liberal Democrats	Mary Seward	808	62.7	−6.7
Conservative	Christopher Hall	385	29.9	−1.0
Labour	Phil Harris	95	7.4	N/A
Majority		423	32.8	
Turnout		1,288		
Liberal Democrats hold		Swing		

Walsingham By-Election 1 October 2009
Party	Candidate	Votes	%	±%
Liberal Democrats	Hugh Lanham	389	58.1	+32.5
Conservative	Tom Fitzpatrick	237	35.4	N/A
Labour	Michael Gates	43	6.4	N/A
Majority		152	22.7	
Turnout		669	36.6	
Liberal Democrats gain from Independent		Swing		

The Runtons By-Election 15 October 2009
Party	Candidate	Votes	%	±%
Conservative	Helen Eales	524	52.1	+2.0
Liberal Democrats	Lucinda Starling	454	45.1	−4.8
Green	Alicia Hull	14	1.4	N/A
Labour	David Russell	14	1.4	N/A
Majority		70	7.0	
Turnout		1,006	55.9	
Conservative hold		Swing		

Lancaster South By-Election 6 May 2010
Party	Candidate	Votes	%	±%
Liberal Democrats	John Lisher	1,066	54.1	−0.4
Conservative	Tom Fitzpatrick	784	39.8	−5.2
Green	Monika Wiedmann	122	6.2	N/A
Majority		282	14.3	
Turnout		1,972	61.1	
Liberal Democrats hold		Swing		

=== 2011-2015 ===
Waterside By-Election 26 April 2012
Party	Candidate	Votes	%	±%
Liberal Democrats	Paul Williams	494	32.2	−8.9
Conservative	Paul Rice	420	27.4	−2.1
Labour	Denise Burke	246	16.0	−0.6
UKIP	Jeff Parkes	233	15.2	−1.8
Green	Anne Filgate	73	4.8	N/A
Independent	Jean Partridge	69	4.5	N/A
Majority		74	4.8	
Turnout		1,535		
Liberal Democrats hold		Swing		

Cromer Town By-Election 21 February 2013
Party	Candidate	Votes	%	±%
Liberal Democrats	Andreas Yiasimi	558	46.6	+19.4
Labour	Jen Emery	240	20.1	−4.5
UKIP	David Ramsbotham	218	18.2	N/A
Conservative	Tony Nash	181	15.1	−20.2
Majority		318	26.6	
Turnout		1,197		
Liberal Democrats gain from Conservative		Swing		

=== 2015-2019 ===
Astley By-Election 14 July 2016
Party	Candidate	Votes	%	±%
Liberal Democrats	Heinrich Butikofer	309	40.8	N/A
Conservative	Joanne Copplestone	198	25.3	−30.7
UKIP	David Ramsbotham	133	17.0	N/A
Green	Amanda Huntridge	81	10.4	−15.8
Labour	Callum Ringer	51	6.5	−11.3
Majority		121	15.5	
Turnout		773	42.80	
Liberal Democrats gain from Conservative		Swing		

Glaven Valley By-Election 29 September 2016
Party	Candidate	Votes	%	±%
Liberal Democrats	Karen Ward	429	55.3	+8.4
Conservative	Andrew Livsey	281	36.2	+3.8
UKIP	John Dymond	32	4.1	−6.9
Labour	Stephen Burke	23	3.0	−2.8
Green	Alicia Hull	11	1.4	−2.5
Majority		148	19.0	+4.6
Turnout		778	44.7	
Liberal Democrats hold		Swing		

Waterside By-Election 9 February 2017
Party	Candidate	Votes	%	±%
Liberal Democrats	Marion Millership	649	55.1	+34.0
Conservative	Anthony Lumbard	410	34.8	+1.6
UKIP	Barry Whitehouse	77	6.5	−8.9
Labour	David Russell	41	3.5	−4.7
Majority		239	20.3	
Turnout		1177	33.2	
Liberal Democrats gain from Conservative		Swing		

Holt By-Election 4 May 2017
Party	Candidate	Votes	%	±%
Conservative	Duncan Baker	724	50.1	+17.5
Liberal Democrats	Naomi Farrow	546	37.8	−8.7
Labour	Richard Kelham	90	6.2	−13.4
UKIP	Terence Comber	84	5.8	−26.8
Majority		178	12.3	
Turnout		1,444		
Conservative gain from Liberal Democrats		Swing		

Worstead By-Election 15 February 2018
Party	Candidate	Votes	%	±%
Liberal Democrats	Saul Penfold	509	72.7	+39.4
Conservative	Robin Russell-Pavier	118	16.9	−24.9
Labour	David Spencer	73	10.4	−1.9
Majority		391	55.9	
Turnout		700		
Liberal Democrats gain from Conservative		Swing		

=== 2019-2023 ===
Sheringham North By-Election 28 November 2019
Party	Candidate	Votes	%	±%
Liberal Democrats	Liz Withington	364	48.4	−15.0
Conservative	Richard Shepherd	323	43.0	+17.9
Labour	Sue Brisbane	65	8.6	−2.8
Majority		41	5.5	
Turnout		752		
Liberal Democrats hold		Swing		

Coastal By-Election 6 May 2021
Party	Candidate	Votes	%	±%
Conservative	Victoria Holliday	585	58.7	+29.4
Liberal Democrats	Phil Bailey	303	30.4	−35.8
Labour	Will Gee	108	10.8	+6.3
Majority		282	28.3	
Turnout		996		
Conservative gain from Liberal Democrats		Swing		

Holt By-Election 6 May 2021
Party	Candidate	Votes	%	±%
Conservative	Eric Vardy	837	47.8	−3.6
Independent	Jono Read	738	42.2	N/A
Labour	Jasper Haywood	112	6.4	N/A
Independent	Nick Coppack	63	3.6	N/A
Majority		99	5.7	
Turnout		1,750		
Conservative hold		Swing		

Stalham By-Election 2 December 2021
Party	Candidate	Votes	%	±%
Conservative	Matthew Taylor	559	55.2	+25.9
Liberal Democrats	Barbara McGoun	375	37.0	−11.1
Labour	Richard Stowe	79	7.8	−0.2
Majority		184	18.2	
Turnout		1,013		
Conservative gain from Liberal Democrats		Swing		

=== 2023-2027 ===
Briston By-Election 7 December 2023
Party	Candidate	Votes	%	±%
Liberal Democrats	Andrew Fletcher	342	49.2	−1.9
Conservative	Jolanda Stenton	274	39.4	−0.8
Green	James Whitehead	64	9.2	N/A
Labour	Philip Harris	15	2.2	−5.6
Majority		68	9.8	
Turnout		695		
Liberal Democrats hold		Swing		

North Walsham East By-Election 4 July 2024
Party	Candidate	Votes	%	±%
Liberal Democrats	Kate Leith	959	45.7	−12.9
Conservative	Tracey Ginbey	717	34.2	+3.2
Labour	David Russell	236	11.2	+0.4
Green	Mike Bossingham	186	8.9	N/A
Majority		242	11.5	
Turnout		2,098		
Liberal Democrats hold		Swing		

North Walsham Market Cross East By-Election 12 September 2024
Party	Candidate	Votes	%	±%
Liberal Democrats	Mal Gray	283	46.5	−3.4
Conservative	Tracey Ginbey	239	39.3	+2.1
Green	Liz Dixon	53	8.7	N/A
Labour	Rebecca Shaw	33	5.4	−6.6
Majority		44	7.2	
Turnout		608		
Liberal Democrats hold		Swing		

Holt By-Election 1 May 2025
Party	Candidate	Votes	%	±%
Liberal Democrats	Connor Rouse	774	41.8	+20.4
Conservative	Alex Savva	536	29.0	−10.3
Reform	Beverley Seaward	441	23.8	N/A
Green	Simon Russell	73	3.9	−12.1
Labour	Fiona Hayward	27	1.5	−6.0
Majority		238	12.9	
Turnout		1,853	46.03	
Liberal Democrats gain from Conservative		Swing		

Suffield Park By-Election 9 July 2026
Party	Candidate	Votes	%	±%
Liberal Democrats	Tyler Wragg	485	65.4	+4.3
Reform	Benjamin Miles	136	18.3	N/A
Conservative	John Lee	88	11.9	−14.1
Green	Paul Sutcliff	20	2.7	−2.9
Labour	David Russell	13	1.8	−5.5
Majority		349	47.0	
Turnout		742		
Liberal Democrats hold		Swing		
