= 1979 North Norfolk District Council election =

1979 English local election

- 3 May 1979

All 46 seats to North Norfolk District Council 24 seats needed for a majority

| | First party | Second party |
|---|---|---|
| Party | Independent | Conservative |
| Seats won | 30 | 14 |
| Seat change | ▼5 | ▲7 |
| Popular vote | 25,229 | 13,893 |
| Percentage | 52.5% | 28.9% |
| Swing | ▲0.9% | ▲2.9% |
| | Third party | Fourth party |
| Party | Labour | Residents |
| Seats won | 2 | 0 |
| Seat change | ▲1 | ▼4 |
| Popular vote | 8,917 | did not stand |
| Percentage | 18.6% | did not stand |
| Swing | ▲8.8% | ▼12.5% |
- Winner of each seat at the 1979 North Norfolk District Council election.
Council control before election
Independent
Council control after election
Independent

The 1979 North Norfolk District Council election took place on 3 May 1979 to elect members of North Norfolk District Council in Norfolk, England. This was on the same day as the 1979 general election and other local elections.

The council was contested on new ward boundaries, decreasing the number of seats by 1 to 46.

== Summary ==
=== Election result ===
1979 North Norfolk District Council election
| Party | Candidates | Seats | Gains | Losses | Net gain/loss | Seats % | Votes % | Votes | +/− |
|---|---|---|---|---|---|---|---|---|---|
| Independent | 46 | 30 | N/A | N/A | ▼5 | 65.2 | 52.5 | 25,229 | +0.9 |
| Conservative | 17 | 14 | N/A | N/A | ▲7 | 30.4 | 28.9 | 13.893 | +2.9 |
| Labour | 17 | 2 | N/A | N/A | ▲1 | 4.3 | 18.6 | 8,917 | +8.8 |
| Residents | 0 | 0 | N/A | N/A | ▼4 | N/A | N/A | N/A | –12.5 |

== Ward results ==
Incumbent councillors standing for re-election are marked with an asterisk (*). Changes in seats do not take into account by-elections or defections.

=== Astley ===
Astley
| Party | Candidate | Votes | % | ±% |
|---|---|---|---|---|
| Independent | C. Reynolds | Unopposed | | |
| Registered electors | | 1,604 | | |
| Independent hold | | | | |

=== Bacton ===
Bacton
| Party | Candidate | Votes | % | ±% |
|---|---|---|---|---|
| Independent | R. Little* | 606 | 59.5 | |
| Labour | C. Wilkins | 412 | 40.5 | |
| Majority | | 194 | 19.1 | |
| Turnout | | 1,018 | 74.6 | |
| Registered electors | | 1,364 | | |
| Independent hold | | Swing | | |

=== Blakeney ===
Blakeney
| Party | Candidate | Votes | % | ±% |
|---|---|---|---|---|
| Independent | G. Allen* | Unopposed | | |
| Registered electors | | 1,360 | | |
| Independent hold | | | | |

=== Bodham ===
Bodham
| Party | Candidate | Votes | % | ±% |
|---|---|---|---|---|
| Conservative | A. Turner | 414 | 42.8 | |
| Independent | R. Thurtle* | 305 | 31.5 | |
| Labour | W. Lynn | 249 | 25.7 | |
| Majority | | 109 | 11.3 | |
| Turnout | | 968 | 77.5 | |
| Registered electors | | 1,249 | | |
| Conservative gain from Independent | | Swing | | |

=== Catfield ===
Catfield
| Party | Candidate | Votes | % | ±% |
|---|---|---|---|---|
| Independent | H. Starkings* | 789 | 81.6 | |
| Labour | G. Wise | 178 | 18.4 | |
| Majority | | 611 | 63.2 | |
| Turnout | | 967 | 74.3 | |
| Registered electors | | 1,301 | | |
| Independent hold | | Swing | | |

=== Chaucer ===
Chaucer
| Party | Candidate | Votes | % | ±% |
|---|---|---|---|---|
| Independent | G. Fisher* | 550 | 59.0 | |
| Labour | A. Richmond | 382 | 41.0 | |
| Majority | | 168 | 18.0 | |
| Turnout | | 932 | 72.6 | |
| Registered electors | | 1,284 | | |
| Independent hold | | Swing | | |

=== Cley ===
Cley
| Party | Candidate | Votes | % |
|---|---|---|---|
| Independent | H. Dawson | 885 | 77.4 |
| Independent | J. Holman | 259 | 22.6 |
| Majority | | 626 | 54.8 |
| Turnout | | 1,144 | 75.0 |
| Registered electors | | 1,525 | |
| Independent win (new seat) | | | |

=== Corpusty ===
Corpusty
| Party | Candidate | Votes | % | ±% |
|---|---|---|---|---|
| Independent | S. Mott-Radclyffe* | 569 | 72.5 | |
| Labour | S. Faircloth | 216 | 27.5 | |
| Majority | | 353 | 45.0 | |
| Turnout | | 785 | 72.0 | |
| Registered electors | | 1,091 | | |
| Independent hold | | Swing | | |

=== Cromer ===
Cromer (2 seats)
| Party | Candidate | Votes | % | ±% |
|---|---|---|---|---|
| Independent | P. Barclay | 1,423 | 59.6 | |
| Independent | J. Walden | 969 | 40.6 | |
| Conservative | F. Bailey | 965 | 40.4 | |
| Independent | T. Bolton* | 727 | 30.4 | |
| Independent | J. Wallace | 199 | 8.3 | |
| Turnout | | ~2,388 | 71.6 | |
| Registered electors | | 3,335 | | |
| Independent hold | | | | |
| Independent gain from Residents | | | | |

=== Erpingham ===
Erpingham
| Party | Candidate | Votes | % | ±% |
|---|---|---|---|---|
| Independent | B. Wright* | Unopposed | | |
| Registered electors | | 1,333 | | |
| Independent hold | | | | |

=== Four Stowes ===
Four Stowes
| Party | Candidate | Votes | % |
|---|---|---|---|
| Independent | D. Kinnear | 495 | 45.5 |
| Independent | L. Matthew | 360 | 33.1 |
| Independent | M. Beckham | 124 | 11.4 |
| Independent | G. Bird | 110 | 10.1 |
| Majority | | 135 | 12.4 |
| Turnout | | 1,089 | 77.5 |
| Registered electors | | 1,405 | |
| Independent win (new seat) | | | |

=== Fulmodeston ===
Fulmodeston
| Party | Candidate | Votes | % | ±% |
|---|---|---|---|---|
| Independent | R. Broughton* | 578 | 64.2 | |
| Independent | T. Roberts | 323 | 35.8 | |
| Majority | | 255 | 28.4 | |
| Turnout | | 901 | 79.7 | |
| Registered electors | | 1,130 | | |
| Independent hold | | Swing | | |

=== Glaven ===
Glaven (2 seats)
| Party | Candidate | Votes | % | ±% |
|---|---|---|---|---|
| Independent | C. Sutton* | 1,253 | 71.4 | |
| Independent | B. Elsden* | 1,087 | 62.0 | |
| Labour | E. High | 502 | 28.6 | |
| Labour | M. Richards | 390 | 22.2 | |
| Turnout | | ~1,756 | 69.0 | |
| Registered electors | | 2,545 | | |
| Independent hold | | | | |
| Independent hold | | | | |

=== Happisburgh ===
Happisburgh
| Party | Candidate | Votes | % |
|---|---|---|---|
| Independent | J. Paterson | Unopposed | |
| Registered electors | | 1,241 | |
| Independent win (new seat) | | | |

=== Hickling ===
Hickling
| Party | Candidate | Votes | % | ±% |
|---|---|---|---|---|
| Conservative | P. Blaxell* | Unopposed | | |
| Registered electors | | 1,359 | | |
| Conservative hold | | | | |

=== Horning ===
Horning
| Party | Candidate | Votes | % | ±% |
|---|---|---|---|---|
| Conservative | F. Page* | Unopposed | | |
| Registered electors | | 926 | | |
| Conservative hold | | | | |

=== Horsefen ===
Horsefen
| Party | Candidate | Votes | % | ±% |
|---|---|---|---|---|
| Independent | V. Bensley* | Unopposed | | |
| Registered electors | | 1,660 | | |
| Independent hold | | | | |

=== Hoveton ===
Hoveton
| Party | Candidate | Votes | % | ±% |
|---|---|---|---|---|
| Conservative | J. Short | Unopposed | | |
| Registered electors | | 1,434 | | |
| Conservative gain from Independent | | | | |

=== Lancaster ===
Lancaster (3 seats)
| Party | Candidate | Votes | % | ±% |
|---|---|---|---|---|
| Conservative | R. Bagshaw | 1,809 | 41.2 | |
| Labour | N. Edwards* | 1,487 | 33.9 | |
| Conservative | H. Thorsen* | 1,230 | 28.0 | |
| Labour | N. Barrett | 1,180 | 26.8 | |
| Independent | R. Edmondson* | 1,090 | 24.8 | |
| Independent | D. Hyde | 782 | 17.8 | |
| Turnout | | ~4,389 | 99.2 | |
| Registered electors | | 4,420 | | |
| Conservative gain from Independent | | | | |
| Labour hold | | | | |
| Conservative hold | | | | |

=== Mundesley ===
Mundesley
| Party | Candidate | Votes | % | ±% |
|---|---|---|---|---|
| Independent | G. Gotts* | 904 | 69.2 | |
| Labour | R. Haynes | 403 | 30.8 | |
| Majority | | 501 | 38.4 | |
| Turnout | | 1,307 | 76.8 | |
| Registered electors | | 1,701 | | |
| Independent hold | | Swing | | |

=== Neatishead ===
Neatishead
| Party | Candidate | Votes | % | ±% |
|---|---|---|---|---|
| Independent | C. Durrant* | Unopposed | | |
| Registered electors | | 1,250 | | |
| Independent hold | | | | |

=== North Walsham East ===
North Walsham East (3 seats)
| Party | Candidate | Votes | % |
|---|---|---|---|
| Independent | F. Bloom | 2,001 | 43.0 |
| Conservative | M. Millington | 1,569 | 33.7 |
| Conservative | J. Masters | 1,327 | 28.6 |
| Conservative | A. Powles* | 1,161 | 25.0 |
| Labour | J. Reilly | 1,076 | 23.1 |
| Turnout | | ~4,649 | 109.9 |
| Registered electors | | 4,228 | |
| Independent hold | | | |
| Conservative hold | | | |
| Conservative hold | | | |

=== North Walsham West ===
North Walsham West
| Party | Candidate | Votes | % |
|---|---|---|---|
| Labour | L. Howlett | 700 | 53.6 |
| Conservative | D. Millington | 606 | 46.4 |
| Majority | | 94 | 7.2 |
| Turnout | | 1,306 | 78.3 |
| Registered electors | | 1,668 | |
| Labour hold | | | |

=== Overstrand ===
Overstrand
| Party | Candidate | Votes | % | ±% |
|---|---|---|---|---|
| Conservative | P. Shewell | Unopposed | | |
| Registered electors | | 1,189 | | |
| Conservative gain from Residents | | | | |

=== Pastonacres ===
Pastonacres
| Party | Candidate | Votes | % | ±% |
|---|---|---|---|---|
| Conservative | C. Perry | Unopposed | | |
| Registered electors | | 1,248 | | |
| Conservative hold | | | | |

=== Roughton ===
Roughton
| Party | Candidate | Votes | % | ±% |
|---|---|---|---|---|
| Independent | M. Dunham* | 995 | 72.1 | |
| Labour | C. Collins | 385 | 27.9 | |
| Majority | | 610 | 44.2 | |
| Turnout | | 1,380 | 75.7 | |
| Registered electors | | 1,822 | | |
| Independent hold | | Swing | | |

=== Scottow ===
Scottow
| Party | Candidate | Votes | % | ±% |
|---|---|---|---|---|
| Independent | L. Eales* | Unopposed | | |
| Registered electors | | 1,533 | | |
| Independent hold | | | | |

=== Sheringham ===
Sheringham (3 seats)
| Party | Candidate | Votes | % | ±% |
|---|---|---|---|---|
| Conservative | R. English | 1,284 | 46.5 | |
| Conservative | F. Atkinson | 1,273 | 46.1 | |
| Conservative | W. Segrue* | 1,222 | 44.2 | |
| Independent | L. McGinn | 1,084 | 39.2 | |
| Independent | A. Denis | 1,031 | 37.3 | |
| Independent | C. Robinson | 1,029 | 37.2 | |
| Independent | N. Parks | 444 | 16.1 | |
| Labour | D. Denny | 395 | 14.3 | |
| Turnout | | ~2,763 | 62.6 | |
| Registered electors | | 4,413 | | |
| Conservative gain from Independent | | | | |
| Conservative gain from Residents | | | | |
| Conservative gain from Residents | | | | |

=== Stalham ===
Stalham
| Party | Candidate | Votes | % | ±% |
|---|---|---|---|---|
| Independent | N. Wright | 722 | 56.3 | |
| Independent | C. Dicker* | 342 | 26.7 | |
| Labour | P. Farmer | 218 | 17.0 | |
| Majority | | 380 | 29.6 | |
| Turnout | | 1,282 | 70.9 | |
| Registered electors | | 1,808 | | |
| Independent hold | | Swing | | |

=== Suffield Park ===
Suffield Park
| Party | Candidate | Votes | % | ±% |
|---|---|---|---|---|
| Independent | E. Lycett* | 734 | 62.0 | |
| Labour | M. Amis | 450 | 38.0 | |
| Majority | | 284 | 24.0 | |
| Turnout | | 1,184 | 78.9 | |
| Registered electors | | 1,501 | | |
| Independent hold | | Swing | | |

=== The Raynhams ===
The Raynhams
| Party | Candidate | Votes | % | ±% |
|---|---|---|---|---|
| Independent | A. Duckworth-Chad* | Unopposed | | |
| Registered electors | | 1,302 | | |
| Independent hold | | | | |

=== The Runtons ===
The Runtons (2 seats)
| Party | Candidate | Votes | % | ±% |
|---|---|---|---|---|
| Independent | E. Young* | Unopposed | | |
| Independent | R. Hughes* | Unopposed | | |
| Registered electors | | 2,357 | | |
| Independent hold | | | | |
| Independent hold | | | | |

=== Walsingham ===
Walsingham
| Party | Candidate | Votes | % | ±% |
|---|---|---|---|---|
| Independent | T. Moore* | Unopposed | | |
| Registered electors | | 1,175 | | |
| Independent hold | | | | |

=== Wells ===
Wells (2 seats)
| Party | Candidate | Votes | % |
|---|---|---|---|
| Independent | D. Hudson | 1,053 | 50.5 |
| Conservative | M. French | 1,033 | 49.5 |
| Independent | J. Christmas* | 719 | 34.4 |
| Turnout | | ~2,086 | 89.4 |
| Registered electors | | 2,333 | |
| Independent hold | | | |
| Conservative gain from Independent | | | |

=== Wensum Valley ===
Wensum Valley
| Party | Candidate | Votes | % | ±% |
|---|---|---|---|---|
| Independent | K. Perowne* | Unopposed | | |
| Registered electors | | 1,223 | | |
| Independent hold | | | | |

=== Worstead ===
Worstead
| Party | Candidate | Votes | % | ±% |
|---|---|---|---|---|
| Independent | M. Carter* | 688 | 70.1 | |
| Labour | H. Nickson | 294 | 29.9 | |
| Majority | | 394 | 40.1 | |
| Turnout | | 982 | 78.1 | |
| Registered electors | | 1,258 | | |
| Independent hold | | Swing | | |
