= 1976 North Norfolk District Council election =

UK local election

- 6 May 1976

All 47 seats to North Norfolk District Council 24 seats needed for a majority

	First party	Second party
Party	Independent	Conservative
Seats won	35	7
Seat change	▼2	▲1
Popular vote	12,729	6,419
Percentage	51.6%	26.0%
Swing	▼12.2%	▲10.0%
	Third party	Fourth party
Party	Residents	Labour
Seats won	4	1
Seat change	▲4	▼3
Popular vote	3,087	2,429
Percentage	12.5%	9.8%
Swing	N/A	▼10.4%
Council control before election
Independent
Council control after election
Independent

The 1976 North Norfolk District Council election took place on 6 May 1976 to elect members of North Norfolk District Council in Norfolk, England. This was on the same day as other local elections.

== Summary ==
=== Election result ===
1976 North Norfolk District Council election
Party	Candidates	Seats	Gains	Losses	Net gain/loss	Seats %	Votes %	Votes	+/−
Independent	44	35			▼2	74.5	51.6	12,729	–12.2
Conservative	10	7			▲1	14.9	26.0	6,419	+10.0
Residents	6	4			▲4	8.5	12.5	3,087	N/A
Labour	9	1			▼3	2.1	9.8	2,429	–10.4
