= 1991 North Norfolk District Council election =

North Norfolk District Council election

- 2 May 1991

All 46 seats to North Norfolk District Council 24 seats needed for a majority

	First party	Second party
Party	Independent	Conservative
Seats won	18	17
Seat change	▼11	▲6
Popular vote	10,841	11,890
Percentage	27.6%	30.2%
Swing	▼21.4%	▲8.4%
	Third party	Fourth party
Party	Labour	Liberal Democrats
Seats won	6	5
Seat change	▲3	▲2
Popular vote	9,071	6,988
Percentage	23.1%	17.8%
Swing	▲5.1%	▲6.6%
- Winner of each seat at the 1991 North Norfolk District Council election.
Council control before election
Independent
Council control after election
No overall control

The 1991 North Norfolk District Council election took place on 2 May 1991 to elect members of North Norfolk District Council in England. This was on the same day as other local elections.

== Summary ==
=== Election result ===
1991 North Norfolk District Council election
Party	Candidates	Seats	Gains	Losses	Net gain/loss	Seats %	Votes %	Votes	+/−
Independent	27	18	2	13	▼11	39.1	27.6	10,841	–21.4
Conservative	29	17	9	3	▲6	37.0	30.2	11,890	+8.4
Labour	36	6	4	1	▲3	13.0	23.1	9,071	+5.1
Liberal Democrats	33	5	3	1	▲2	10.9	17.8	6,988	+6.6
Green	3	0	0	0	Steady	0.0	1.3	530	N/A

== Ward results ==
Incumbent councillors standing for re-election are marked with an asterisk (*). Changes in seats do not take into account by-elections or defections.

=== Astley ===
Astley
Party	Candidate	Votes	%	±%
Independent	G. Eke*	Unopposed		
Registered electors		1,787		
Independent hold				

=== Bacton ===
Bacton
Party	Candidate	Votes	%	±%
Independent	M. Strong*	467	56.7	
Liberal Democrats	P. Baldwin	243	29.5	
Labour	F. Eckett	113	13.7	
Majority		224	27.2	
Turnout		823	52.7	
Registered electors		1,568		
Independent hold		Swing		

=== Blakeney ===
Blakeney
Party	Candidate	Votes	%	±%
Independent	R. Wootten*	454	54.0	
Labour	C. Gates	240	28.5	
Liberal Democrats	L. Stainer	147	17.5	
Majority		214	25.4	
Turnout		841	52.7	
Registered electors		1,610		
Independent hold		Swing		

=== Bodham ===
Bodham
Party	Candidate	Votes	%	±%
Conservative	J. Perry-Warnes*	516	57.0	
Liberal Democrats	E. High	195	21.5	
Labour	G. Parker	195	21.5	
Majority		321	35.4	
Turnout		906	57.1	
Registered electors		1,591		
Conservative hold		Swing		

=== Catfield ===
Catfield
Party	Candidate	Votes	%	±%
Independent	C. Nunn	382	52.1	
Labour	K. Bacon	351	47.9	
Majority		31	4.2	
Turnout		733	46.6	
Registered electors		1,588		
Independent hold		Swing		

=== Chaucer ===
Chaucer
Party	Candidate	Votes	%	±%
Independent	G. Fisher*	386	53.6	
Independent	G. Heard	334	46.4	
Majority		52	7.2	
Turnout		720	50.7	
Registered electors		1,437		
Independent hold		Swing		

=== Cley ===
Cley
Party	Candidate	Votes	%	±%
Independent	H. Dawson*	419	60.2	
Independent	P. White	145	20.8	
Labour	R. Kelham	132	19.0	
Majority		274	39.4	
Turnout		696	52.8	
Registered electors		1,330		
Independent hold		Swing		

=== Corpusty ===
Corpusty
Party	Candidate	Votes	%	±%
Independent	R. Misselbrook	287	59.4	
Labour	S. Booth	122	25.3	
Liberal Democrats	J. Revett	74	15.3	
Majority		165	34.2	
Turnout		483	42.0	
Registered electors		1,158		
Independent hold		Swing		

=== Cromer ===
Cromer (2 seats)
Party	Candidate	Votes	%	±%
Independent	L. Randall	956	39.5	
Conservative	T. Bolton*	682	28.1	
Conservative	J. Leeds*	600	24.7	
Labour	D. Bussey	452	18.7	
Liberal Democrats	H. Noble	333	13.7	
Liberal Democrats	G. Hunnable	220	9.1	
Turnout		~1,857	44.5	
Registered electors		4,175		
Independent hold				
Conservative gain from Independent				

=== Erpingham ===
Erpingham
Party	Candidate	Votes	%	±%
Labour	D. Spencer	330	40.0	
Conservative	S. Arnold	298	36.1	
Liberal Democrats	D. Harrison*	198	24.0	
Majority		32	3.9	
Turnout		826	57.1	
Registered electors		1,450		
Labour gain from Liberal Democrats		Swing		

=== Four Stowes ===
Four Stowes
Party	Candidate	Votes	%	±%
Conservative	R. Wright	435	48.5	
Independent	D. Kinnear*	176	19.6	
Labour	O. Savoury	170	19.0	
Liberal Democrats	J. Corney	115	12.8	
Majority		259	28.9	
Turnout		896	59.3	
Registered electors		1,523		
Conservative gain from Independent		Swing		

=== Fulmodeston ===
Fulmodeston
Party	Candidate	Votes	%	±%
Independent	R. Broughton*	501	71.4	
Labour	A. Dick	201	28.6	
Majority		300	42.7	
Turnout		702	52.7	
Registered electors		1,347		
Independent hold		Swing		

=== Glaven ===
Glaven (2 seats)
Party	Candidate	Votes	%	±%
Liberal Democrats	H. Cordeaux	796	41.9	
Liberal Democrats	R. Stone	724	38.1	
Conservative	M. Cubitt	523	27.5	
Conservative	S. Blount	508	26.7	
Labour	W. Monaghan	437	23.0	
Independent	A. Hull	143	7.5	
Turnout		~1,581	50.9	
Registered electors		3,105		
Liberal Democrats hold				
Liberal Democrats gain from Independent				

=== Happisburgh ===
Happisburgh
Party	Candidate	Votes	%	±%
Independent	J. Paterson*	328	42.6	
Labour	D. Mole	298	38.7	
Liberal Democrats	D. Black	144	18.7	
Majority		30	3.9	
Turnout		770	45.7	
Registered electors		1,705		
Independent hold		Swing		

=== Hickling ===
Hickling
Party	Candidate	Votes	%	±%
Conservative	P. Blaxell*	476	52.8	
Labour	H. Banks	242	26.9	
Liberal Democrats	D. Tobin	183	20.3	
Majority		234	26.0	
Turnout		901	58.2	
Registered electors		1,557		
Conservative hold		Swing		

=== Horning ===
Horning
Party	Candidate	Votes	%	±%
Conservative	W. Greenhill*	390	75.4	
Labour	A. Warnes	74	14.3	
Liberal Democrats	P. Colk	53	10.3	
Majority		316	61.1	
Turnout		517	54.6	
Registered electors		950		
Conservative hold		Swing		

=== Horsefen ===
Horsefen
Party	Candidate	Votes	%	±%
Independent	G. Wise	519	54.3	
Conservative	C. Robertshaw	437	45.7	
Majority		82	8.6	
Turnout		956	51.4	
Registered electors		1,874		
Independent hold		Swing		

=== Hoveton ===
Hoveton
Party	Candidate	Votes	%	±%
Independent	R. Hutchinson*	415	50.9	
Conservative	T. Fanthorpe	400	49.1	
Majority		15	1.8	
Turnout		815	51.1	
Registered electors		1,617		
Independent gain from Conservative		Swing		

=== Lancaster ===
Lancaster (3 seats)
Party	Candidate	Votes	%	±%
Conservative	H. Barrow*	1,258	47.9	
Conservative	A. Tickle	1,190	45.3	
Labour	N. Barrett*	930	35.4	
Labour	M. Warnes	656	24.9	
Labour	D. Batts	647	24.6	
Liberal Democrats	D. Bird	441	16.8	
Liberal Democrats	D. Holm	326	12.4	
Turnout		~2,345	43.1	
Registered electors		5,441		
Conservative gain from Independent				
Conservative gain from Independent				
Labour hold				

=== Mundesley ===
Mundesley
Party	Candidate	Votes	%	±%
Conservative	G. Gotts*	632	52.6	
Independent	B. Gotts	275	22.9	
Labour	N. King	176	14.7	
Liberal Democrats	P. Corney	118	9.8	
Majority		357	29.7	
Turnout		1,201	57.4	
Registered electors		2,126		
Conservative gain from Independent		Swing		

=== Neatishead ===
Neatishead
Party	Candidate	Votes	%	±%
Independent	C. Durrant*	598	78.4	
Liberal Democrats	Y. Rushman	91	11.9	
Labour	L. Hawkes	74	9.7	
Majority		507	66.4	
Turnout		763	55.2	
Registered electors		1,398		
Independent hold		Swing		

=== North Walsham East ===
North Walsham East (3 seats)
Party	Candidate	Votes	%	±%
Conservative	R. Rose	1,296	33.0	
Independent	C. Cushion*	1,192	30.4	
Conservative	P. Rayna*	1,158	29.5	
Labour	M. Booth	862	22.0	
Labour	J. Heal	811	20.7	
Labour	D. Cunningham	715	18.2	
Liberal Democrats	M. Young-Bullimore	576	14.7	
Liberal Democrats	I. Henderson	404	10.3	
Liberal Democrats	D. Davies	392	10.0	
Turnout		~2,827	47.8	
Registered electors		5,913		
Conservative hold				
Independent gain from Conservative				
Conservative hold				

=== North Walsham West ===
North Walsham West
Party	Candidate	Votes	%	±%
Labour	E. Gray	501	64.1	
Conservative	N. Horner-Glister	281	35.9	
Majority		220	28.1	
Turnout		782	45.0	
Registered electors		1,792		
Labour hold		Swing		

=== Overstrand ===
Overstrand
Party	Candidate	Votes	%	±%
Conservative	P. Shewell*	333	55.7	
Independent	C. Page	160	26.8	
Liberal Democrats	H. Sidle	105	17.6	
Majority		173	28.9	
Turnout		598	53.8	
Registered electors		1,112		
Conservative hold		Swing		

=== Pastonacres ===
Pastonacres
Party	Candidate	Votes	%	±%
Liberal Democrats	P. Corney*	445	46.7	
Labour	R. Lemmon	261	27.4	
Conservative	H. Adams	247	25.9	
Majority		184	19.3	
Turnout		953	66.7	
Registered electors		1,435		
Liberal Democrats gain from Conservative		Swing		

=== Roughton ===
Roughton
Party	Candidate	Votes	%	±%
Conservative	W. Arnold*	432	44.4	
Labour	C. Collins	302	31.0	
Liberal Democrats	A. Seaman	126	12.9	
Green	S. Crouch	113	11.6	
Majority		130	13.4	
Turnout		973	48.2	
Registered electors		2,047		
Conservative gain from Independent		Swing		

=== Scottow ===
Scottow
Party	Candidate	Votes	%	±%
Labour	M. Cullingham*	328	49.5	
Conservative	W. Fryer	263	39.7	
Liberal Democrats	B. Lamb	71	10.7	
Majority		65	9.8	
Turnout		662	43.0	
Registered electors		1,546		
Labour gain from Independent		Swing		

=== Sheringham ===
Sheringham (3 seats)
Party	Candidate	Votes	%	±%
Conservative	L. McGinn	1,117	35.1	
Liberal Democrats	A. Dennis*	1,001	31.5	
Conservative	B. Alton*	816	25.7	
Liberal Democrats	K. Beckett	755	23.8	
Conservative	B. Smith	723	22.7	
Liberal Democrats	G. Ward	507	15.9	
Independent	J. Nichols	487	15.3	
Green	J. Long	300	9.4	
Labour	P. Crump	277	8.7	
Labour	P. Skelton	246	7.7	
Labour	D. Seymour	235	7.4	
Turnout		~2,408	48.0	
Registered electors		5,016		
Conservative gain from Independent				
Liberal Democrats hold				
Conservative hold				

=== Stalham ===
Stalham
Party	Candidate	Votes	%	±%
Conservative	G. Bird	496	46.0	
Labour	D. Hollebon	446	41.3	
Liberal Democrats	J. Walker	137	12.7	
Majority		50	4.6	
Turnout		1,079	47.5	
Registered electors		2,285		
Conservative gain from Labour		Swing		

=== Suffield Park ===
Suffield Park
Party	Candidate	Votes	%	±%
Independent	V. Woodcock*	594	78.7	
Conservative	J. Todrayner	161	21.3	
Majority		433	57.4	
Turnout		755	45.7	
Registered electors		1,653		
Independent hold		Swing		

=== The Raynhams ===
The Raynhams
Party	Candidate	Votes	%	±%
Independent	A. Duckworth-Chad*	494	69.0	
Labour	P. Batts	222	31.0	
Majority		272	38.0	
Turnout		716	40.2	
Registered electors		1,787		
Independent hold		Swing		

=== The Runtons ===
The Runtons (2 seats)
Party	Candidate	Votes	%	±%
Liberal Democrats	G. Craske	702	45.9	
Conservative	P. Caswell	551	36.1	
Liberal Democrats	J. Crampsie	529	34.6	
Conservative	P. Simpson	489	32.0	
Labour	M. Amis	158	10.3	
Labour	J. Moore	120	7.9	
Green	A. Zelter	117	7.7	
Turnout		~1,405	55.3	
Registered electors		2,540		
Liberal Democrats gain from Independent				
Conservative gain from Independent				

=== Walsingham ===
Walsingham
Party	Candidate	Votes	%	±%
Independent	T. Moore*	Unopposed		
Registered electors		1,164		
Independent hold				

=== Wells ===
Wells (2 seats)
Party	Candidate	Votes	%	±%
Labour	M. Gates	755	34.5	
Conservative	M. French*	666	30.4	
Independent	D. Hudson*	431	19.7	
Liberal Democrats	E. Anderson	338	15.4	
Turnout		~1,408	57.7	
Registered electors		2,440		
Labour gain from Independent				
Conservative hold				

=== Wensum Valley ===
Wensum Valley
Party	Candidate	Votes	%	±%
Independent	K. Perowne*	391	55.2	
Liberal Democrats	P. Chubb	205	29.0	
Labour	E. Richards	112	15.8	
Majority		186	26.3	
Turnout		708	49.2	
Registered electors		1,440		
Independent hold		Swing		

=== Worstead ===
Worstead
Party	Candidate	Votes	%	±%
Labour	S. Shaw	310	40.4	
Independent	T. Hardingham*	307	40.0	
Liberal Democrats	C. Wilkins	151	19.7	
Majority		3	0.4	
Turnout		768	54.0	
Registered electors		1,429		
Labour gain from Independent		Swing		
