= 1987 North Norfolk District Council election =

UK local election

- 7 May 1987

All 46 seats to North Norfolk District Council 24 seats needed for a majority

	First party	Second party
Party	Independent	Conservative
Seats won	29	11
Seat change	Steady	▼3
Popular vote	19,608	8,704
Percentage	49.0%	21.8%
Swing	▲9.1%	▼6.2%
	Third party	Fourth party
Party	Labour	Alliance
Seats won	3	3
Seat change	▲1	▲2
Popular vote	7,175	4,493
Percentage	17.9%	11.2%
Swing	▼5.7%	▲3.9%
- Winner of each seat at the 1987 North Norfolk District Council election.
Council control before election
Independent
Council control after election
Independent

The 1987 North Norfolk District Council election took place on 7 May 1987 to elect members of North Norfolk District Council in Norfolk, England. This was on the same day as other local elections.

== Summary ==
=== Election result ===
1987 North Norfolk District Council election
Party	Candidates	Seats	Gains	Losses	Net gain/loss	Seats %	Votes %	Votes	+/−
Independent	45	29	5	5	Steady	52.2	49.0	19,608	+9.1
Conservative	14	11	2	5	▼3	34.8	21.8	8,704	–6.2
Labour	20	3	1	0	▲1	6.5	17.9	7,175	–5.7
Alliance	8	3	2	0	▲2	6.5	11.2	4,493	+3.9

== Ward results ==
Incumbent councillors standing for re-election are marked with an asterisk (*). Changes in seats do not take into account by-elections or defections.

=== Astley ===
Astley
Party	Candidate	Votes	%	±%
Independent	K. Jackson	423	50.5	
Labour	M. Warnes	415	49.5	
Majority		8	1.0	
Turnout		838	48.8	
Registered electors		1,716		
Independent hold		Swing		

=== Bacton ===
Bacton
Party	Candidate	Votes	%	±%
Independent	M. Strong*	537	69.4	
Alliance	P. Baldwin	237	30.6	
Majority		300	38.8	
Turnout		774	51.4	
Registered electors		1,505		
Independent hold		Swing		

=== Blakeney ===
Blakeney
Party	Candidate	Votes	%	±%
Independent	R. Wootten*	437	48.7	
Labour	R. Draper	269	30.0	
Independent	J. Greenacre	192	21.4	
Majority		168	18.7	
Turnout		898	58.7	
Registered electors		1,530		
Independent hold		Swing		

=== Bodham ===
Bodham
Party	Candidate	Votes	%	±%
Conservative	W. Cummings	Unopposed		
Registered electors		1,559		
Conservative hold				

=== Catfield ===
Catfield
Party	Candidate	Votes	%	±%
Independent	H. Starkings*	Unopposed		
Registered electors		1,519		
Independent hold				

=== Chaucer ===
Chaucer
Party	Candidate	Votes	%	±%
Independent	G. Fisher*	337	48.6	
Independent	L. Aviss	260	37.5	
Labour	P. Crump	97	14.0	
Majority		77	11.1	
Turnout		694	49.9	
Registered electors		1,390		
Independent hold		Swing		

=== Cley ===
Cley
Party	Candidate	Votes	%	±%
Independent	H. Dawson*	Unopposed		
Registered electors		1,276		
Independent hold				

=== Corpusty ===
Corpusty
Party	Candidate	Votes	%	±%
Independent	S. Mott-Radclyffe*	388	61.2	
Labour	R. Collins	246	38.8	
Majority		142	22.4	
Turnout		634	62.8	
Registered electors		1,009		
Independent hold		Swing		

=== Cromer ===
Cromer (2 seats)
Party	Candidate	Votes	%	±%
Independent	T. Bolton	996	68.3	
Independent	J. Leeds*	931	63.8	
Labour	D. Bussey	462	31.7	
Turnout		~1,462	37.0	
Registered electors		3,950		
Independent hold				
Independent gain from Conservative				

=== Erpingham ===
Erpingham
Party	Candidate	Votes	%	±%
Alliance	D. Harrison	342	50.6	
Conservative	A. Cargill	334	49.4	
Majority		8	1.2	
Turnout		676	47.4	
Registered electors		1,425		
Alliance gain from Independent		Swing		

=== Four Stowes ===
Four Stowes
Party	Candidate	Votes	%	±%
Independent	D. Kinnear*	Unopposed		
Registered electors		1,479		
Independent hold				

=== Fulmodeston ===
Fulmodeston
Party	Candidate	Votes	%	±%
Independent	R. Broughton*	478	76.1	
Labour	B. Craske	150	23.9	
Majority		328	52.2	
Turnout		628	48.3	
Registered electors		1,301		
Independent hold		Swing		

=== Glaven ===
Glaven (2 seats)
Party	Candidate	Votes	%	±%
Alliance	I. Ainsworth	1,034	57.0	
Independent	C. Sutton*	781	43.0	
Independent	M. Baker*	582	32.0	
Turnout		~1,519	51.0	
Registered electors		2,977		
Alliance gain from Independent				
Independent hold				

=== Happisburgh ===
Happisburgh
Party	Candidate	Votes	%	±%
Independent	J. Paterson*	Unopposed		
Registered electors		1,559		
Independent hold				

=== Hickling ===
Hickling
Party	Candidate	Votes	%	±%
Conservative	P. Blaxell*	589	66.6	
Labour	M. Cullingham	295	33.4	
Majority		294	33.3	
Turnout		884	60.0	
Registered electors		1,473		
Conservative hold		Swing		

=== Horning ===
Horning
Party	Candidate	Votes	%	±%
Conservative	W. Greenhill*	420	81.1	
Independent	P. Colk	98	18.9	
Majority		322	62.2	
Turnout		518	55.9	
Registered electors		926		
Conservative hold		Swing		

=== Horsefen ===
Horsefen
Party	Candidate	Votes	%	±%
Independent	V. Bensley*	Unopposed		
Registered electors		1,753		
Independent hold				

=== Hoveton ===
Hoveton
Party	Candidate	Votes	%	±%
Conservative	J. Webb	471	58.7	
Independent	R. Hutchinson	331	41.3	
Majority		140	17.5	
Turnout		802	47.9	
Registered electors		1,673		
Conservative gain from Independent		Swing		

=== Lancaster ===
Lancaster (3 seats)
Party	Candidate	Votes	%	±%
Independent	H. Barrow*	1,141	58.3	
Independent	R. Bagshaw*	1,000	51.0	
Labour	N. Barrett	815	41.7	
Independent	L. Hogston	677	34.6	
Independent	D. Batts	540	27.6	
Independent	R. Plumb	518	26.5	
Independent	P. Batts	488	25.0	
Turnout		~2,041	41.0	
Registered electors		4,979		
Independent gain from Conservative				
Independent gain from Conservative				
Labour hold				

=== Mundesley ===
Mundesley
Party	Candidate	Votes	%	±%
Independent	G. Gotts*	Unopposed		
Registered electors		1,889		
Independent hold				

=== Neatishead ===
Neatishead
Party	Candidate	Votes	%	±%
Independent	C. Durrant*	603	80.5	
Alliance	R. Rushman	146	19.5	
Majority		457	61.0	
Turnout		749	56.2	
Registered electors		1,333		
Independent hold		Swing		

=== North Walsham East ===
North Walsham East (3 seats)
Party	Candidate	Votes	%	±%
Conservative	P. Barnes	1,244	40.7	
Conservative	P. Rayna	964	31.5	
Conservative	H. Linford*	922	30.1	
Independent	G. Johnson	821	26.8	
Labour	J. Taylor	557	18.2	
Labour	M. Booth	548	17.9	
Alliance	H. Nickson	436	14.3	
Independent	L. Stott	269	8.8	
Independent	P. Stott	257	8.4	
Independent	M. Young-Bullimore	242	7.9	
Turnout		~2,460	46.0	
Registered electors		5,349		
Conservative hold				
Conservative hold				
Conservative gain from Independent				

=== North Walsham West ===
North Walsham West
Party	Candidate	Votes	%	±%
Labour	J. Heal*	438	52.2	
Conservative	J. Le Grice	401	47.8	
Majority		37	4.4	
Turnout		839	48.0	
Registered electors		1,749		
Labour hold		Swing		

=== Overstrand ===
Overstrand
Party	Candidate	Votes	%	±%
Conservative	P. Shewell*	Unopposed		
Registered electors		1,192		
Conservative hold				

=== Pastonacres ===
Pastonacres
Party	Candidate	Votes	%	±%
Conservative	C. Bayne*	492	61.7	
Labour	M. Ward	305	38.3	
Majority		187	23.5	
Turnout		797	57.9	
Registered electors		1,376		
Conservative hold		Swing		

=== Roughton ===
Roughton
Party	Candidate	Votes	%	±%
Independent	W. Arnold	535	65.4	
Labour	R. Lemmon	283	34.6	
Majority		252	30.8	
Turnout		818	41.6	
Registered electors		1,967		
Independent hold		Swing		

=== Scottow ===
Scottow
Party	Candidate	Votes	%	±%
Independent	A. Paterson	Unopposed		
Registered electors		1,485		
Independent gain from Conservative				

=== Sheringham ===
Sheringham (3 seats)
Party	Candidate	Votes	%	±%
Alliance	A. Dennis*	1,053	31.1	
Conservative	B. Alton	1,007	29.8	
Independent	R. English*	985	29.1	
Conservative	B. Wilson*	958	28.3	
Alliance	G. Ward	674	19.9	
Alliance	K. Plant	571	16.9	
Labour	L. Watson	339	10.0	
Turnout		~2,175	44.0	
Registered electors		4,942		
Alliance hold				
Conservative hold				
Independent gain from Conservative				

=== Stalham ===
Stalham
Party	Candidate	Votes	%	±%
Labour	D. Jones	548	50.4	
Independent	N. Wright*	539	49.6	
Majority		9	0.8	
Turnout		1,087	49.5	
Registered electors		2,195		
Labour gain from Independent		Swing		

=== Suffield Park ===
Suffield Park
Party	Candidate	Votes	%	±%
Independent	V. Woodcock	519	64.2	
Independent	A. Prior	290	35.8	
Majority		229	28.3	
Turnout		809	49.9	
Registered electors		1,622		
Independent hold		Swing		

=== The Raynhams ===
The Raynhams
Party	Candidate	Votes	%	±%
Independent	A. Duckworth-Chad*	Unopposed		
Registered electors		1,540		
Independent hold				

=== The Runtons ===
The Runtons (2 seats)
Party	Candidate	Votes	%	±%
Independent	R. Hughes*	874	76.7	
Independent	E. Young*	740	64.9	
Labour	D. Green	265	23.3	
Turnout		~1,133	45.0	
Registered electors		2,518		
Independent hold				
Independent hold				

=== Walsingham ===
Walsingham
Party	Candidate	Votes	%	±%
Independent	T. Moore*	530	77.9	
Labour	S. Docking	150	22.1	
Majority		380	55.9	
Turnout		680	56.5	
Registered electors		1,204		
Independent hold		Swing		

=== Wells ===
Wells (2 seats)
Party	Candidate	Votes	%	±%
Conservative	M. French*	902	41.9	
Independent	D. Hudson*	795	36.9	
Labour	M. Gates	456	21.2	
Labour	B. Longwell	330	15.3	
Turnout		~1,463	59.0	
Registered electors		2,480		
Conservative hold				
Independent hold				

=== Wensum Valley ===
Wensum Valley
Party	Candidate	Votes	%	±%
Independent	K. Perowne*	Unopposed		
Registered electors		1,324		
Independent hold				

=== Worstead ===
Worstead
Party	Candidate	Votes	%	±%
Independent	T. Hardingham	264	38.8	
Independent	A. Bunnett	210	30.8	
Labour	S. Shaw	207	30.4	
Majority		54	7.9	
Turnout		681	50.5	
Registered electors		1,348		
Independent hold		Swing		
