= 2011 North Norfolk District Council election =

2011 English local government election

- 5 May 2011

All 48 seats to North Norfolk District Council 25 seats needed for a majority

	First party	Second party
Party	Conservative	Liberal Democrats
Seats before	16	30
Seats won	28	18
Seat change	▲12	▼12
Popular vote	16,990	20,478
Percentage	30.7%	37.0%
Swing	▼9.4%	▼11.2%
	Third party	Fourth party
Party	UKIP	Independent
Seats before	0	0
Seats won	1	1
Seat change	▲1	▼1
Popular vote	2,996	915
Percentage	5.4%	1.7%
Swing	▲4.4%	▼4.1%
Control before election
Liberal Democrats
Control after election
Conservative

The 2011 North Norfolk District Council election took place on 5 May 2011 to elect members to North Norfolk District Council in Norfolk, England. This was on the same day as other local elections.

There were 48 seats up for election, all councillors from all wards. The results of the election produced a majority for the Conservatives who gained overall control of the council for the first time, replacing the Liberal Democrats.

== Summary ==
=== Election result ===
2011 North Norfolk District Council election
Party	Candidates	Seats	Gains	Losses	Net gain/loss	Seats %	Votes %	Votes	+/−
Conservative	33	28	12	0	▲12	58.3	30.7	16,990	–9.4
Liberal Democrats	45	18	0	12	▼12	37.5	37.0	20,478	–11.2
UKIP	12	1	1	0	▲1	2.1	5.4	2,996	+4.4
Independent	2	1	1	2	▼1	2.1	1.7	915	–4.1
Labour	48	0	0	0	Steady	0.0	19.8	10,948	+16.0
Green	25	0	0	0	Steady	0.0	5.3	2,951	+4.4

== Ward results ==
Incumbent councillors standing for re-election are marked with an asterisk (*). Changes in seats do not take into account by-elections or defections.

=== Astley ===
Astley
Party	Candidate	Votes	%	±%
Conservative	Russell Wright	359	39.6	
Liberal Democrats	Ben Bix	257	28.4	
Labour	Ann Poberefsky	156	17.2	
Green	Julia Bird	134	14.8	
Majority		102	11.3	
Turnout		906	50.1	
Registered electors		1,825		
Conservative gain from Liberal Democrats		Swing		

=== Briston ===
Briston
Party	Candidate	Votes	%	±%
Liberal Democrats	John Wyatt*	310	33.2	
Conservative	Jenny English	300	32.1	
Labour	Aubrey Poberefsky	164	17.5	
UKIP	Lynette Comber	116	12.4	
Green	Sharon Harvey	45	4.8	
Majority		10	1.1	
Turnout		935	50.7	
Registered electors		1,864		
Liberal Democrats hold		Swing		

=== Chaucer ===
Chaucer
Party	Candidate	Votes	%	±%
Liberal Democrats	Anthea Sweeney*	428	39.9	
Conservative	Alistair Mackay	335	31.3	
UKIP	Terry Comber	134	12.5	
Labour	Ruth Smith	116	10.8	
Green	Anne Hood	59	5.5	
Majority		93	8.7	
Turnout		1,072	57.9	
Registered electors		1,869		
Liberal Democrats hold		Swing		

=== Corpusty ===
Corpusty
Party	Candidate	Votes	%	±%
Conservative	John Perry-Warnes*	505	42.4	
UKIP	David Ramsbotham	370	31.0	
Labour	Joseph Flack	130	10.9	
Liberal Democrats	Julia Dovey	114	9.6	
Green	Barbara Coppard	73	6.1	
Majority		135	11.3	
Turnout		1,192	63.9	
Registered electors		1,877		
Conservative hold		Swing		

=== Cromer Town ===
Cromer Town (2 seats)
Party	Candidate	Votes	%	±%
Conservative	Benjie Cabbell-Manners*	509	37.4	
Conservative	Keith Johnson*	476	34.9	
Liberal Democrats	Andy Yiasimi	367	26.9	
Labour	Phil Harris	332	24.4	
Liberal Democrats	John Frosdick	312	22.9	
Labour	David Phillip-Pritchard	286	21.0	
Green	Brigid Warner	154	11.3	
Turnout		~1,362	45.7	
Registered electors		2,950		
Conservative hold				
Conservative hold				

=== Erpingham ===
Erpingham
Party	Candidate	Votes	%	±%
Conservative	Norman Smith	455	42.1	
Liberal Democrats	Philip Holmes	352	32.6	
Labour	Sebastian Sutcliffe	149	13.8	
Green	Jez Fredenburgh	124	11.5	
Majority		103	9.5	
Turnout		1,080	55.3	
Registered electors		1,965		
Conservative hold		Swing		

=== Gaunt ===
Gaunt
Party	Candidate	Votes	%	±%
Liberal Democrats	Graham Jones*	668	69.3	
Labour	Paul Dark	158	16.4	
Green	Peter Crouch	138	14.3	
Majority		510	52.9	
Turnout		964	51.4	
Registered electors		1,971		
Liberal Democrats hold		Swing		

=== Glaven Valley ===
Glaven Valley
Party	Candidate	Votes	%	±%
Conservative	Lindsay Brettle*	500	50.3	
Liberal Democrats	Elizabeth Gent	232	23.3	
Labour	Ruth Bartlett	95	9.6	
Green	Rupert Rosser	84	8.5	
UKIP	Irene Ramsbotham	83	8.4	
Majority		268	27.0	
Turnout		994	57.0	
Registered electors		1,768		
Conservative hold		Swing		

=== Happisburgh ===
Happisburgh
Party	Candidate	Votes	%	±%
Liberal Democrats	Lee Walker	720	79.6	
Labour	Barry Hester	185	20.4	
Majority		535	59.1	
Turnout		905	47.3	
Registered electors		2,044		
Liberal Democrats hold		Swing		

=== High Heath ===
High Heath
Party	Candidate	Votes	%	±%
Liberal Democrats	David Young	581	68.3	
Green	Rosalind Redfern	159	18.7	
Labour	Samuel Cooper	111	13.0	
Majority		422	49.6	
Turnout		851	56.3	
Registered electors		1,621		
Liberal Democrats hold		Swing		

=== Holt ===
Holt (2 seats)
Party	Candidate	Votes	%	±%
UKIP	Michael Baker*	946	44.7	
Liberal Democrats	Philip High*	819	38.7	
Liberal Democrats	Barbara Young	260	12.3	
Labour	Jonathon Read	237	11.2	
Green	Paula d'Attoma	113	5.3	
Green	Peter Morrison	96	4.5	
Labour	Thomas Shirley	93	4.4	
Turnout		~1,706	55.5	
Registered electors		2,923		
UKIP gain from Independent				
Liberal Democrats hold				

=== Hoveton ===
Hoveton
Party	Candidate	Votes	%	±%
Conservative	Nigel Dixon*	554	59.7	
Liberal Democrats	Anthony Gent	215	23.2	
Labour	Michael Cullingham	159	17.1	
Majority		339	36.5	
Turnout		928	55.4	
Registered electors		1,693		
Conservative hold		Swing		

=== Lancaster North ===
Lancaster North (2 seats)
Party	Candidate	Votes	%	±%
Conservative	Ann Claussen-Reynolds	423	39.1	
Conservative	Michael Reynolds	420	38.8	
Liberal Democrats	Sean Mears*	402	37.1	
Liberal Democrats	Lisa Smerdon	356	32.9	
Labour	Brenda Coldrick	258	23.8	
Labour	Bertie Pope	197	18.2	
Turnout		~1,158	41.7	
Registered electors		2,775		
Conservative gain from Liberal Democrats				
Conservative gain from Liberal Democrats				

=== Lancaster South ===
Lancaster South (2 seats)
Party	Candidate	Votes	%	±%
Conservative	Jeremy Punchard	509	41.8	
Conservative	Steven Ward	447	36.7	
Liberal Democrats	Gloria Lisher*	326	26.7	
Liberal Democrats	John Lisher	308	25.3	
Labour	Allan Rands	254	20.8	
Labour	Pamela Cowburn	217	17.8	
Green	Frances Collinson	130	10.7	
Turnout		~1,219	37.5	
Registered electors		3,252		
Conservative gain from Liberal Democrats				
Conservative gain from Liberal Democrats				

=== Mundesley ===
Mundesley (2 seats)
Party	Candidate	Votes	%	±%
Conservative	Wyndham Northam*	921	49.6	
Conservative	Barry Smith*	728	39.2	
Liberal Democrats	Lucy Cass	590	31.8	
Liberal Democrats	Spencer Whalley*	332	17.9	
Labour	Daniel Spencer	206	11.1	
Labour	Martyn Sloman	203	10.9	
Green	Anthony Ashford	140	7.5	
Turnout		~1,857	49.1	
Registered electors		3,408		
Conservative hold				
Conservative hold				

=== North Walsham East ===
North Walsham East (2 seats)
Party	Candidate	Votes	%	±%
Liberal Democrats	Peter Moore*	881	58.7	
Liberal Democrats	Vivienne Uprichard	723	48.2	
Labour	Jeanne Heal	409	27.3	
Labour	Stephen Burke	363	24.2	
Green	Joanne Todd	210	14.0	
Turnout		~1,502	46.1	
Registered electors		3,351		
Liberal Democrats hold				
Liberal Democrats hold				

=== North Walsham North ===
North Walsham North (2 seats)
Party	Candidate	Votes	%	±%
Liberal Democrats	Nigel Lloyd	767	59.4	
Liberal Democrats	Eric Seward*	712	55.1	
Labour	Elizabeth Cornwall	329	25.5	
Labour	Thomas Cornwall	256	19.8	
Green	Penelope Day	196	15.2	
Turnout		~1,291	42.4	
Registered electors		3,221		
Liberal Democrats hold				
Liberal Democrats hold				

=== North Walsham West ===
North Walsham West (2 seats)
Party	Candidate	Votes	%	±%
Liberal Democrats	Virginia Gay*	910	67.9	
Liberal Democrats	Ann Moore*	834	62.2	
Labour	David Spencer	431	32.1	
Labour	Brenda West	366	27.3	
Turnout		~1,340	45.6	
Registered electors		3,327		
Liberal Democrats hold				
Liberal Democrats hold				

=== Poppyland ===
Poppyland
Party	Candidate	Votes	%	±%
Conservative	Angela Fitch-Tillett*	542	54.1	
Labour	Julie Spencer	185	18.5	
UKIP	Stephen Scott-Fawcett	152	15.2	
Green	Alicia Hull	122	12.2	
Majority		357	35.7	
Turnout		1,001	53.3	
Registered electors		1,908		
Conservative hold		Swing		

=== Priory ===
Priory (2 seats)
Party	Candidate	Votes	%	±%
Conservative	Jonathan Savory*	748	30.0	
Independent	Peter Terrington	617	24.7	
Liberal Democrats	Joyce Trett*	515	20.6	
Labour	Michael Gates	268	10.7	
Liberal Democrats	Andrew Curtis	233	9.3	
Labour	Catherine Gates	229	9.2	
UKIP	Derek Baxter	217	8.7	
Green	Rosemary Amesbury	131	5.2	
Turnout		~2,494	54.5	
Registered electors		4,571		
Conservative hold				
Independent gain from Liberal Democrats				

=== Roughton ===
Roughton
Party	Candidate	Votes	%	±%
Conservative	Susan Arnold*	451	47.7	
Liberal Democrats	Richard Harbord	267	28.3	
Labour	Timothy Bartlett	134	14.2	
Green	James Spiller	93	9.8	
Majority		184	19.5	
Turnout		945	52.7	
Registered electors		1,827		
Conservative hold		Swing		

=== Scottow ===
Scottow
Party	Candidate	Votes	%	±%
Conservative	Trevor Ivory	335	43.2	
Liberal Democrats	Granville Yaxley	309	39.9	
Labour	James Mannering	131	16.9	
Majority		26	3.4	
Turnout		775	42.2	
Registered electors		1,860		
Conservative gain from Liberal Democrats		Swing		

=== Sheringham North ===
Sheringham North (2 seats)
Party	Candidate	Votes	%	±%
Liberal Democrats	Brian Hannah*	708	39.9	
Liberal Democrats	Richard Smith	396	22.3	
Conservative	Geraldine Burns	345	19.5	
Independent	Noel Gant	298	16.8	
Labour	Alexander Phillip-Pritchard	151	8.5	
Labour	David Thompson	150	8.5	
UKIP	David Wilson	149	8.4	
Green	Colin Millen	122	6.9	
Turnout		~1,776	47.6	
Registered electors		2,864		
Liberal Democrats hold				
Liberal Democrats hold				

=== Sheringham South ===
Sheringham South (2 seats)
Party	Candidate	Votes	%	±%
Conservative	Richard Shepherd	655	37.1	
Conservative	David Oliver	587	33.3	
Liberal Democrats	Penelope Bevan Jones	504	28.6	
Liberal Democrats	Julia Moss*	414	23.5	
Labour	Samuel Rushworth	321	18.2	
Labour	Callum Ringer	311	17.6	
UKIP	Richard Amies	195	11.1	
Green	Marianne Coleman	89	5.0	
Turnout		~1,765	53.7	
Registered electors		3,173		
Conservative gain from Liberal Democrats				
Conservative gain from Liberal Democrats				

=== St. Benet ===
St. Benet
Party	Candidate	Votes	%	±%
Liberal Democrats	Barbara McGoun*	678	69.6	
Labour	Clive Sellick	148	15.2	
UKIP	Roger Parkes	148	15.2	
Majority		530	54.4	
Turnout		974	54.7	
Registered electors		1,816		
Liberal Democrats hold		Swing		

=== Stalham & Sutton ===
Stalham & Sutton (2 seats)
Party	Candidate	Votes	%	±%
Liberal Democrats	Pauline Grove-Jones	589	38.3	
Conservative	Robert Stevens	501	32.6	
Labour	Sheila Cullingham	449	29.2	
Liberal Democrats	Shirley Partridge	427	27.8	
Labour	David Russell	277	18.0	
Turnout		~1,538	42.9	
Registered electors		3,412		
Liberal Democrats hold				
Conservative hold				

=== Suffield Park ===
Suffield Park (2 seats)
Party	Candidate	Votes	%	±%
Conservative	Hilary Thompson	791	44.7	
Conservative	John Lee*	647	36.6	
Labour	Gregory Hayman	405	22.9	
Labour	Scott Eastwood	370	20.9	
Liberal Democrats	Neale Grearson	266	15.0	
Liberal Democrats	John Crampsie	201	11.3	
UKIP	Robert Russell	168	9.5	
Green	Ruby Warner	138	7.8	
Turnout		~1,770	49.9	
Registered electors		3,319		
Conservative hold				
Conservative hold				

=== The Raynhams ===
The Raynhams
Party	Candidate	Votes	%	±%
Conservative	Rebecca Palmer	345	45.5	
Liberal Democrats	David Callaby	242	31.9	
Labour	Trevor Potter	171	22.6	
Majority		103	13.6	
Turnout		758	39.1	
Registered electors		1,946		
Conservative gain from Liberal Democrats		Swing		

=== The Runtons ===
The Runtons
Party	Candidate	Votes	%	±%
Conservative	Marjorie Eales	757	67.3	
Liberal Democrats	Karen Crane	188	16.7	
Labour	Iain Manson	122	10.8	
Green	Rupert Eris	58	5.2	
Majority		569	50.6	
Turnout		1,125	63.0	
Registered electors		1,794		
Conservative hold		Swing		

=== Walsingham ===
Walsingham
Party	Candidate	Votes	%	±%
Conservative	Thomas Fitzpatrick	359	45.2	
Liberal Democrats	Hugh Lanham	301	37.9	
Labour	Desmond Hewitt	135	17.0	
Majority		58	7.3	
Turnout		795	44.2	
Registered electors		1,819		
Conservative gain from Independent		Swing		

=== Waterside ===
Waterside (2 seats)
Party	Candidate	Votes	%	±%
Conservative	Ben Jarvis	773	35.9	
Liberal Democrats	Simon Partridge*	752	34.9	
Conservative	Susan Rhodes	553	25.7	
UKIP	Jeffrey Parkes	318	14.8	
Labour	Michael French	311	14.4	
Labour	Nicholas Webb	220	10.2	
Turnout		~1,873	52.4	
Registered electors		3,574		
Conservative gain from Liberal Democrats				
Liberal Democrats hold				

=== Waxham ===
Waxham
Party	Candidate	Votes	%	±%
Conservative	Richard Price*	405	47.1	
Labour	Denise Burke	289	33.6	
Green	Anne Filgate	165	19.2	
Majority		116	13.5	
Turnout		859	48.8	
Registered electors		1,784		
Conservative hold		Swing		

=== Wensum ===
Wensum
Party	Candidate	Votes	%	±%
Conservative	Ann Green*	468	48.7	
Liberal Democrats	Jacqueline Howe	247	25.7	
Labour	Caroline Craske	152	15.8	
Green	Timothy Doncaster	94	9.8	
Majority		221	23.0	
Turnout		961	53.1	
Registered electors		1,838		
Conservative gain from Liberal Democrats		Swing		

=== Worstead ===
Worstead
Party	Candidate	Votes	%	±%
Liberal Democrats	Glyn Williams	465	46.7	
Conservative	Peter Fitch	287	28.8	
Labour	Cameron Lugton	159	16.0	
Green	Elizabeth McKenna	84	8.4	
Majority		178	17.9	
Turnout		995	53.1	
Registered electors		1,881		
Liberal Democrats hold		Swing		

== By-elections ==
Waterside By-election 26 April 2012
Party	Candidate	Votes	%	±%
Liberal Democrats	Paul Williams	494	32.2	−8.9
Conservative	Paul Rice	420	27.4	−2.1
Labour	Denise Burke	246	16.0	−0.6
UKIP	Jeff Parkes	233	15.2	−1.8
Green	Anne Filgate	73	4.8	N/A
Independent	Jean Partridge	69	4.5	N/A
Majority		74	4.8	
Turnout		1,535		
Liberal Democrats hold		Swing		

Cromer Town By-election 21 February 2013
Party	Candidate	Votes	%	±%
Liberal Democrats	Andreas Yiasimi	558	46.6	+19.4
Labour	Jen Emery	240	20.1	−4.5
UKIP	David Ramsbotham	218	18.2	N/A
Conservative	Tony Nash	181	15.1	−20.2
Majority		318	26.6	
Turnout		1,197		
Liberal Democrats gain from Conservative		Swing		
