= 1999 North Norfolk District Council election =

North Norfolk District Council election

- 6 May 1999

All 46 seats to North Norfolk District Council 24 seats needed for a majority

	First party	Second party
Party	Conservative	Liberal Democrats
Seats won	14	12
Seat change	▲10	Steady
Popular vote	14,895	15,220
Percentage	31.0%	31.7%
Swing	▲12.8%	▲2.9%
	Third party	Fourth party
Party	Labour	Independent
Seats won	10	10
Seat change	▼9	▼1
Popular vote	11,776	6,118
Percentage	24.5%	12.7%
Swing	▼10.6%	▼5.1%
- Winner of each seat at the 1999 North Norfolk District Council election.
Council control before election
No overall control
Council control after election
No overall control

The 1999 North Norfolk District Council election took place on 6 May 1999 to elect members of North Norfolk District Council in Norfolk, England. This was on the same day as other local elections.

== Summary ==
=== Election result ===
1999 North Norfolk District Council election
Party	Candidates	Seats	Gains	Losses	Net gain/loss	Seats %	Votes %	Votes	+/−
Conservative	32	14	10	0	▲10	30.4	31.0	14,895	+12.8
Liberal Democrats	45	12	6	6	Steady	26.1	31.7	15,220	+2.9
Labour	41	10	9	0	▼9	21.7	24.5	11,776	–10.6
Independent	15	10	2	3	▼1	21.7	12.7	6,118	–5.1

== Ward results ==
Incumbent councillors standing for re-election are marked with an asterisk (*). Changes in seats do not take into account by-elections or defections.

=== Astley ===
Astley
Party	Candidate	Votes	%	±%
Liberal Democrats	J. Wyatt	357	39.5	
Independent	G. Eke*	269	29.8	
Labour	A. Poberefsky	141	15.6	
Conservative	J. Blyth	137	15.2	
Majority		88	9.7	
Turnout		904	43.7	
Registered electors		2,070		
Liberal Democrats gain from Independent		Swing		

=== Bacton ===
Bacton
Party	Candidate	Votes	%	±%
Independent	M. Strong*	497	70.8	
Labour	M. Owens	129	18.4	
Liberal Democrats	J. Kemp	76	10.8	
Majority		368	52.4	
Turnout		702	42.7	
Registered electors		1,655		
Independent hold		Swing		

=== Blakeney ===
Blakeney
Party	Candidate	Votes	%	±%
Conservative	B. Crowe	413	47.4	
Liberal Democrats	A. Groom*	408	46.8	
Labour	R. Kelham	51	5.8	
Majority		5	0.6	
Turnout		872	56.7	
Registered electors		1,541		
Conservative gain from Liberal Democrats		Swing		

=== Bodham ===
Bodham
Party	Candidate	Votes	%	±%
Conservative	J. Perry-Warnes*	648	69.8	
Liberal Democrats	J. Pike	198	21.3	
Labour	D. Callaby	83	8.9	
Majority		450	48.4	
Turnout		929	57.2	
Registered electors		1,629		
Conservative hold		Swing		

=== Catfield ===
Catfield
Party	Candidate	Votes	%	±%
Labour	K. Bacon*	285	38.7	
Liberal Democrats	S. Partridge	280	38.0	
Conservative	P. Simison	171	23.2	
Majority		5	0.7	
Turnout		736	45.2	
Registered electors		1,636		
Labour hold		Swing		

=== Chaucer ===
Chaucer
Party	Candidate	Votes	%	±%
Liberal Democrats	J. Sweeney*	443	67.7	
Labour	F. Morrison	211	32.3	
Majority		232	35.5	
Turnout		654	43.2	
Registered electors		1,543		
Liberal Democrats hold		Swing		

=== Cley ===
Cley
Party	Candidate	Votes	%	±%
Liberal Democrats	H. Cordeaux*	455	66.3	
Conservative	S. Freeman	173	25.2	
Labour	M. Booth	58	8.5	
Majority		282	41.1	
Turnout		686	55.5	
Registered electors		1,252		
Liberal Democrats hold		Swing		

=== Corpusty ===
Corpusty
Party	Candidate	Votes	%	±%
Labour	A. Poberefsky*	278	49.6	
Conservative	R. Wright	241	43.0	
Liberal Democrats	J. Corney	42	7.5	
Majority		37	6.6	
Turnout		561	51.1	
Registered electors		1,100		
Labour hold		Swing		

=== Cromer ===
Cromer (2 seats)
Party	Candidate	Votes	%	±%
Conservative	T. Manners	784	31.5	
Independent	L. Randall*	692	27.8	
Liberal Democrats	H. Noble*	634	25.5	
Labour	L. Hawkes	376	15.1	
Liberal Democrats	A. Ward	294	11.8	
Labour	C. Vanlint	271	10.9	
Turnout		~1,786	37.8	
Registered electors		4,725		
Conservative gain from Liberal Democrats				
Independent hold				

=== Erpingham ===
Erpingham
Party	Candidate	Votes	%	±%
Labour	D. Spencer*	336	60.2	
Liberal Democrats	J. Hooton	222	39.8	
Majority		114	20.4	
Turnout		558	37.4	
Registered electors		1,524		
Labour hold		Swing		

=== Four Stowes ===
Four Stowes
Party	Candidate	Votes	%	±%
Conservative	M. Cushing*	493	64.0	
Labour	T. Weight	153	19.9	
Liberal Democrats	J. Bortoft	124	16.1	
Majority		340	44.2	
Turnout		770	51.3	
Registered electors		1,504		
Conservative hold		Swing		

=== Fulmodeston ===
Fulmodeston
Party	Candidate	Votes	%	±%
Independent	R. Broughton*	336	51.9	
Labour	K. Craske	150	23.1	
Conservative	C. Williams	110	17.0	
Liberal Democrats	S. Harrison	52	8.0	
Majority		186	28.7	
Turnout		648	47.1	
Registered electors		1,379		
Independent hold		Swing		

=== Glaven ===
Glaven (2 seats)
Party	Candidate	Votes	%	±%
Conservative	M. Baker	865	48.5	
Liberal Democrats	R. Stone*	726	40.7	
Conservative	J. Hancock	619	34.7	
Liberal Democrats	S. Brieger	564	31.6	
Labour	A. Davies	193	10.8	
Turnout		~1,646	46.9	
Registered electors		3,510		
Conservative gain from Liberal Democrats				
Liberal Democrats hold				

=== Happisburgh ===
Happisburgh
Party	Candidate	Votes	%	±%
Independent	S. Willis	275	38.9	
Liberal Democrats	N. Stennett-Cox	261	36.9	
Labour	C. Pike	171	24.2	
Majority		14	2.0	
Turnout		707	37.5	
Registered electors		1,888		
Independent gain from Liberal Democrats		Swing		

=== Hickling ===
Hickling
Party	Candidate	Votes	%	±%
Independent	D. Corbett	476	59.0	
Labour	D. Russell*	266	33.0	
Liberal Democrats	R. Mussett	65	8.1	
Majority		210	26.0	
Turnout		807	51.3	
Registered electors		1,582		
Independent gain from Labour		Swing		

=== Horning ===
Horning
Party	Candidate	Votes	%	±%
Conservative	C. Haddow*	330	77.6	
Labour	S. Booth	66	15.5	
Liberal Democrats	J. Pearce	29	6.8	
Majority		264	62.1	
Turnout		425	45.2	
Registered electors		943		
Conservative hold		Swing		

=== Horsefen ===
Horsefen
Party	Candidate	Votes	%	±%
Independent	G. Wise*	610	81.9	
Labour	C. Buck	135	18.1	
Majority		475	63.8	
Turnout		745	39.0	
Registered electors		1,934		
Independent hold		Swing		

=== Hoveton ===
Hoveton
Party	Candidate	Votes	%	±%
Conservative	R. Massingham	457	71.9	
Labour	P. Lasko	113	17.8	
Liberal Democrats	A. Howe	66	10.4	
Majority		344	54.1	
Turnout		636	40.5	
Registered electors		1,572		
Conservative gain from Independent		Swing		

=== Lancaster ===
Lancaster (3 seats)
Party	Candidate	Votes	%	±%
Labour	B. Coldrick*	807	30.5	
Conservative	R. Banham	764	28.9	
Labour	D. Hewitt*	742	28.1	
Independent	P. Walker	741	28.0	
Conservative	K. Barrow	737	27.9	
Labour	J. Holdom	677	25.6	
Liberal Democrats	P. White	335	12.7	
Liberal Democrats	D. Bird	292	11.0	
Liberal Democrats	P. Young	269	10.2	
Turnout		~2,044	32.9	
Registered electors		6,208		
Labour hold				
Conservative gain from Labour				
Labour hold				

=== Mundesley ===
Mundesley
Party	Candidate	Votes	%	±%
Conservative	W. Northam	563	48.7	
Liberal Democrats	C. Frewing	467	40.4	
Labour	M. Cox	126	10.9	
Majority		96	8.3	
Turnout		1,156	44.7	
Registered electors		2,590		
Conservative gain from Independent		Swing		

=== Neatishead ===
Neatishead
Party	Candidate	Votes	%	±%
Independent	C. Durrant*	437	79.5	
Labour	D. Banks	60	10.9	
Liberal Democrats	P. Corney	53	9.6	
Majority		377	68.5	
Turnout		550	37.2	
Registered electors		1,482		
Independent hold		Swing		

=== North Walsham East ===
North Walsham East (3 seats)
Party	Candidate	Votes	%	±%
Conservative	R. Rose	917	31.9	
Labour	R. Haynes*	889	30.9	
Labour	E. Cornwall*	834	29.0	
Conservative	B. Stevens	764	26.6	
Labour	G. Turner	721	25.1	
Independent	R. Cushion	597	20.7	
Liberal Democrats	P. Gibbons	476	16.5	
Liberal Democrats	G. Smith	386	13.4	
Liberal Democrats	P. Bortoft	313	10.9	
Turnout		~5,901	79.4	
Registered electors		7,435		
Conservative gain from Labour				
Labour hold				
Labour hold				

=== North Walsham West ===
North Walsham West
Party	Candidate	Votes	%	±%
Liberal Democrats	M. Birch	371	43.4	
Labour	P. Buck*	364	42.6	
Conservative	G. Wishart	120	14.0	
Majority		7	0.8	
Turnout		855	45.4	
Registered electors		1,891		
Liberal Democrats gain from Labour		Swing		

=== Overstrand ===
Overstrand
Party	Candidate	Votes	%	±%
Independent	J. Fathers*	255	41.0	
Conservative	J. Barrett	214	34.4	
Liberal Democrats	G. Duniam	80	12.9	
Labour	J. Midgely	73	11.7	
Majority		41	6.6	
Turnout		622	52.3	
Registered electors		1,136		
Independent hold		Swing		

=== Pastonacres ===
Pastonacres
Party	Candidate	Votes	%	±%
Liberal Democrats	D. Venvell*	304	42.7	
Conservative	J. Self	298	41.9	
Labour	M. Stonestreet	110	15.4	
Majority		6	0.8	
Turnout		712	49.3	
Registered electors		1,447		
Liberal Democrats hold		Swing		

=== Roughton ===
Roughton
Party	Candidate	Votes	%	±%
Liberal Democrats	C. Harrold	441	41.1	
Conservative	A. Stammer	333	31.0	
Labour	C. Collins	300	27.9	
Majority		108	10.1	
Turnout		1,074	49.5	
Registered electors		2,183		
Liberal Democrats gain from Labour		Swing		

=== Scottow ===
Scottow
Party	Candidate	Votes	%	±%
Liberal Democrats	C. Wilkins	270	50.2	
Labour	W. Pike	135	25.1	
Conservative	R. Illingworth	133	24.7	
Majority		135	25.1	
Turnout		538	31.8	
Registered electors		1,696		
Liberal Democrats gain from Labour		Swing		

=== Sheringham ===
Sheringham (3 seats)
Party	Candidate	Votes	%	±%
Liberal Democrats	B. Hannah*	1,262	44.9	
Liberal Democrats	H. Nelson*	1,056	37.6	
Conservative	L. McGinn*	902	32.1	
Liberal Democrats	J. Brinkhurst	790	28.1	
Conservative	C. Storey	718	25.6	
Conservative	E. Harvey	677	24.1	
Independent	A. Pemberton	343	12.2	
Labour	K. Jackson	305	10.8	
Turnout		~2,293	38.6	
Registered electors		5,947		
Liberal Democrats hold				
Liberal Democrats hold				
Conservative hold				

=== Stalham ===
Stalham
Party	Candidate	Votes	%	±%
Labour	M. Cullingham*	432	42.1	
Conservative	A. Vincent	351	34.2	
Liberal Democrats	J. Webb	242	23.6	
Majority		81	7.9	
Turnout		1,025	43.2	
Registered electors		2,381		
Labour hold		Swing		

=== Suffield Park ===
Suffield Park
Party	Candidate	Votes	%	±%
Independent	V. Woodcock*	404	62.3	
Liberal Democrats	R. Robinson	244	37.7	
Majority		160	24.7	
Turnout		648	39.6	
Registered electors		1,686		
Independent hold		Swing		

=== The Raynhams ===
The Raynhams
Party	Candidate	Votes	%	±%
Labour	P. Kemp*	290	41.5	
Conservative	B. Holden	254	36.3	
Liberal Democrats	O. Towers	80	11.4	
Independent	G. Plowright	75	10.7	
Majority		36	5.2	
Turnout		699	39.4	
Registered electors		1,804		
Labour hold		Swing		

=== The Runtons ===
The Runtons (2 seats)
Party	Candidate	Votes	%	±%
Conservative	D. Rowe	535	43.0	
Conservative	J. Todrayner	520	41.8	
Liberal Democrats	A. Caine	442	35.5	
Liberal Democrats	G. Cavanagh	400	32.1	
Labour	S. Gardiner	186	15.0	
Independent	D. Pegg	81	6.5	
Turnout		~1,188	44.5	
Registered electors		2,670		
Conservative gain from Liberal Democrats				
Conservative gain from Liberal Democrats				

=== Walsingham ===
Walsingham
Party	Candidate	Votes	%	±%
Independent	T. Moore*	414	80.4	
Labour	J. Spencer	67	13.0	
Liberal Democrats	J. Chard	34	6.6	
Majority		347	67.4	
Turnout		515	44.7	
Registered electors		1,160		
Independent hold		Swing		

=== Wells ===
Wells (2 seats)
Party	Candidate	Votes	%	±%
Labour	M. Gates*	510	37.5	
Liberal Democrats	J. Trett	469	34.5	
Conservative	P. Darling	381	28.0	
Liberal Democrats	H. Hagag	290	21.3	
Labour	T. Vincent*	271	19.9	
Turnout		~1,155	47.5	
Registered electors		2,431		
Labour hold				
Liberal Democrats gain from Labour				

=== Wensum Valley ===
Wensum Valley
Party	Candidate	Votes	%	±%
Conservative	D. Baxter	273	38.0	
Liberal Democrats	S. Towers	225	31.3	
Labour	T. Potter*	220	30.6	
Majority		48	6.7	
Turnout		718	48.2	
Registered electors		1,495		
Conservative gain from Labour		Swing		

=== Worstead ===
Worstead
Party	Candidate	Votes	%	±%
Liberal Democrats	P. Wilkins	333	63.5	
Labour	E. Stonestreet	191	36.5	
Majority		142	27.1	
Turnout		524	37.2	
Registered electors		1,432		
Liberal Democrats gain from Labour		Swing		
