= 1995 North Norfolk District Council election =

1995 English local government election

- 4 May 1995

All 46 seats to North Norfolk District Council 24 seats needed for a majority

| | First party | Second party |
|---|---|---|
| Party | Labour | Liberal Democrats |
| Seats won | 19 | 12 |
| Seat change | ▲13 | ▲7 |
| Popular vote | 17,732 | 14,549 |
| Percentage | 35.1% | 28.8% |
| Swing | ▲12.0% | ▲11.0% |
| | Third party | Fourth party |
| Party | Independent | Conservative |
| Seats won | 11 | 4 |
| Seat change | ▼7 | ▼13 |
| Popular vote | 8,980 | 9,167 |
| Percentage | 17.8% | 18.2% |
| Swing | ▼9.8% | ▼12.0% |
- Winner of each seat at the 1995 North Norfolk District Council election.
Control before election
No overall control
Control after election
No overall control

The 1995 North Norfolk District Council election took place on 4 May 1995 to elect members of North Norfolk District Council in England. This was on the same day as other local elections.

== Summary ==
=== Election results ===
1995 North Norfolk District Council election
| Party | Candidates | Seats | Gains | Losses | Net gain/loss | Seats % | Votes % | Votes | +/− |
|---|---|---|---|---|---|---|---|---|---|
| Labour | 37 | 19 | 13 | 0 | ▲13 | 40.0 | 35.1 | 17,732 | +12.0 |
| Liberal Democrats | 35 | 12 | 7 | 0 | ▲7 | 26.7 | 28.8 | 14,549 | +11.0 |
| Independent | 29 | 11 | 2 | 9 | ▼7 | 24.4 | 17.8 | 8,980 | –9.8 |
| Conservative | 16 | 4 | 0 | 13 | ▼13 | 8.9 | 18.2 | 9,167 | –12.0 |
| Green | 1 | 0 | 0 | 0 | Steady | 0.0 | 0.1 | 68 | –1.2 |

== Ward results ==
Incumbent councillors standing for re-election are marked with an asterisk (*). Changes in seats do not take into account by-elections or defections.

=== Astley ===
Astley
| Party | Candidate | Votes | % | ±% |
|---|---|---|---|---|
| Independent | G. Eke* | Unopposed | | |
| Registered electors | | 2,028 | | |
| Independent hold | | | | |

=== Bacton ===
Bacton
| Party | Candidate | Votes | % | ±% |
|---|---|---|---|---|
| Independent | M. Strong* | 468 | 65.2 | |
| Labour | L. Hawkes | 250 | 34.8 | |
| Majority | | 218 | 30.4 | |
| Turnout | | 718 | 45.9 | |
| Registered electors | | 1,568 | | |
| Independent hold | | Swing | | |

=== Blakeney ===
Blakeney
| Party | Candidate | Votes | % | ±% |
|---|---|---|---|---|
| Liberal Democrats | A. Groom | 473 | 53.6 | |
| Independent | R. Wootten* | 300 | 34.0 | |
| Labour | O. Savoury | 110 | 12.5 | |
| Majority | | 173 | 19.6 | |
| Turnout | | 883 | 57.1 | |
| Registered electors | | 1,554 | | |
| Liberal Democrats gain from Independent | | Swing | | |

=== Bodham ===
Bodham
| Party | Candidate | Votes | % | ±% |
|---|---|---|---|---|
| Conservative | J. Perry-Warnes* | 506 | 50.0 | |
| Liberal Democrats | A. Chapman | 350 | 34.6 | |
| Labour | G. Parker | 156 | 15.4 | |
| Majority | | 156 | 15.4 | |
| Turnout | | 1,012 | 61.6 | |
| Registered electors | | 1,642 | | |
| Conservative hold | | Swing | | |

=== Catfield ===
Catfield
| Party | Candidate | Votes | % | ±% |
|---|---|---|---|---|
| Labour | K. Bacon | 460 | 57.5 | |
| Independent | C. Nunn* | 340 | 42.5 | |
| Majority | | 120 | 15.0 | |
| Turnout | | 800 | 50.1 | |
| Registered electors | | 1,604 | | |
| Labour gain from Independent | | Swing | | |

=== Chaucer ===
Chaucer
| Party | Candidate | Votes | % | ±% |
|---|---|---|---|---|
| Liberal Democrats | J. Sweeney | 297 | 38.3 | |
| Independent | S. Maguire | 240 | 31.0 | |
| Independent | G. Fisher* | 238 | 30.7 | |
| Majority | | 59 | 7.4 | |
| Turnout | | 775 | 53.6 | |
| Registered electors | | 1,453 | | |
| Liberal Democrats gain from Independent | | Swing | | |

=== Cley ===
Cley
| Party | Candidate | Votes | % | ±% |
|---|---|---|---|---|
| Liberal Democrats | H. Cordeaux | 292 | 38.3 | |
| Labour | R. Kelham | 241 | 31.6 | |
| Independent | I. Large | 142 | 18.6 | |
| Independent | R. Percival | 87 | 11.4 | |
| Majority | | 51 | 6.7 | |
| Turnout | | 762 | 59.8 | |
| Registered electors | | 1,274 | | |
| Liberal Democrats gain from Independent | | Swing | | |

=== Corpusty ===
Corpusty
| Party | Candidate | Votes | % | ±% |
|---|---|---|---|---|
| Labour | A. Poberefsky | 356 | 58.4 | |
| Independent | R. Misselbrook* | 210 | 34.4 | |
| Liberal Democrats | J. Corney | 44 | 7.2 | |
| Majority | | 146 | 23.9 | |
| Turnout | | 610 | 56.8 | |
| Registered electors | | 1,079 | | |
| Labour gain from Independent | | Swing | | |

=== Cromer ===
Cromer (2 seats)
| Party | Candidate | Votes | % | ±% |
|---|---|---|---|---|
| Independent | L. Randall* | 909 | 33.3 | |
| Liberal Democrats | H. Noble* | 805 | 29.5 | |
| Liberal Democrats | J. Smith | 707 | 25.9 | |
| Conservative | P. Northway | 554 | 20.3 | |
| Labour | C. Vanlint | 463 | 17.0 | |
| Turnout | | ~2,028 | 46.3 | |
| Registered electors | | 4,384 | | |
| Independent hold | | | | |
| Liberal Democrats gain from Conservative | | | | |

=== Erpingham ===
Erpingham
| Party | Candidate | Votes | % | ±% |
|---|---|---|---|---|
| Labour | D. Spencer* | 475 | 65.0 | |
| Independent | N. Horner-Glister | 199 | 27.2 | |
| Liberal Democrats | P. Corney | 57 | 7.8 | |
| Majority | | 276 | 37.8 | |
| Turnout | | 731 | 49.2 | |
| Registered electors | | 1,501 | | |
| Labour hold | | Swing | | |

=== Four Stowes ===
Four Stowes
| Party | Candidate | Votes | % | ±% |
|---|---|---|---|---|
| Conservative | M. Cushing | 324 | 36.1 | |
| Labour | J. Benny | 298 | 33.2 | |
| Liberal Democrats | A. Lotis | 276 | 30.7 | |
| Majority | | 26 | 2.9 | |
| Turnout | | 898 | 59.2 | |
| Registered electors | | 1,529 | | |
| Conservative hold | | Swing | | |

=== Fulmodeston ===
Fulmodeston
| Party | Candidate | Votes | % | ±% |
|---|---|---|---|---|
| Independent | R. Broughton* | 370 | 54.4 | |
| Labour | A. Kahn | 205 | 30.1 | |
| Liberal Democrats | V. Trezise | 105 | 15.4 | |
| Majority | | 165 | 24.3 | |
| Turnout | | 680 | 52.8 | |
| Registered electors | | 1,304 | | |
| Independent hold | | Swing | | |

=== Glaven ===
Glaven (2 seats)
| Party | Candidate | Votes | % | ±% |
|---|---|---|---|---|
| Liberal Democrats | N. Cockaday | 980 | 53.8 | |
| Liberal Democrats | R. Stone* | 828 | 45.4 | |
| Conservative | M. Kennett | 541 | 29.7 | |
| Labour | A. Aberdein | 302 | 16.6 | |
| Turnout | | ~1,666 | 52.5 | |
| Registered electors | | 3,175 | | |
| Liberal Democrats hold | | | | |
| Liberal Democrats hold | | | | |

=== Happisburgh ===
Happisburgh
| Party | Candidate | Votes | % | ±% |
|---|---|---|---|---|
| Liberal Democrats | D. Will* | 571 | 69.7 | |
| Labour | R. Rondeaux | 248 | 30.3 | |
| Majority | | 323 | 39.4 | |
| Turnout | | 819 | 47.0 | |
| Registered electors | | 1,765 | | |
| Liberal Democrats gain from Independent | | Swing | | |

=== Hickling ===
Hickling
| Party | Candidate | Votes | % | ±% |
|---|---|---|---|---|
| Labour | D. Russell | 439 | 50.7 | |
| Conservative | P. Blaxell* | 427 | 49.3 | |
| Majority | | 12 | 1.4 | |
| Turnout | | 866 | 57.2 | |
| Registered electors | | 1,531 | | |
| Labour gain from Conservative | | Swing | | |

=== Horning ===
Horning
| Party | Candidate | Votes | % | ±% |
|---|---|---|---|---|
| Conservative | C. Haddow | 309 | 62.2 | |
| Labour | P. Carter | 134 | 27.0 | |
| Liberal Democrats | B. Roughley | 54 | 10.9 | |
| Majority | | 175 | 35.2 | |
| Turnout | | 497 | 53.2 | |
| Registered electors | | 935 | | |
| Conservative hold | | Swing | | |

=== Horsefen ===
Horsefen
| Party | Candidate | Votes | % | ±% |
|---|---|---|---|---|
| Independent | G. Wise* | 570 | 71.6 | |
| Conservative | C. Robertshaw | 226 | 28.4 | |
| Majority | | 344 | 43.2 | |
| Turnout | | 796 | 42.1 | |
| Registered electors | | 1,892 | | |
| Independent hold | | Swing | | |

=== Hoveton ===
Hoveton
| Party | Candidate | Votes | % | ±% |
|---|---|---|---|---|
| Independent | R. Hutchison* | Unopposed | | |
| Registered electors | | 1,596 | | |
| Independent hold | | | | |

=== Lancaster ===
Lancaster (3 seats)
| Party | Candidate | Votes | % | ±% |
|---|---|---|---|---|
| Labour | B. Coldrick | 1,213 | 46.4 | |
| Labour | D. Hewitt | 1,184 | 45.3 | |
| Labour | D. Batts | 1,093 | 41.8 | |
| Conservative | H. Barrow* | 772 | 29.5 | |
| Liberal Democrats | O. Wood | 631 | 24.1 | |
| Liberal Democrats | D. Bird | 509 | 19.5 | |
| Liberal Democrats | J. Howe | 477 | 18.2 | |
| Turnout | | ~2,484 | 43.2 | |
| Registered electors | | 5,747 | | |
| Labour gain from Conservative | | | | |
| Labour gain from Conservative | | | | |
| Labour hold | | | | |

=== Mundesley ===
Mundesley
| Party | Candidate | Votes | % | ±% |
|---|---|---|---|---|
| Independent | G. Gotts* | 529 | 44.2 | |
| Liberal Democrats | J. Verney | 436 | 36.4 | |
| Labour | E. Tagg | 232 | 19.4 | |
| Majority | | 93 | 7.8 | |
| Turnout | | 1,197 | 50.2 | |
| Registered electors | | 2,404 | | |
| Independent gain from Conservative | | Swing | | |

=== Neatishead ===
Neatishead
| Party | Candidate | Votes | % | ±% |
|---|---|---|---|---|
| Independent | C. Durrant* | 454 | 67.4 | |
| Labour | R. Harding | 155 | 23.0 | |
| Liberal Democrats | Y. Rushman | 65 | 9.6 | |
| Majority | | 299 | 44.4 | |
| Turnout | | 674 | 48.0 | |
| Registered electors | | 1,407 | | |
| Independent hold | | Swing | | |

=== North Walsham East ===
North Walsham East (3 seats)
| Party | Candidate | Votes | % | ±% |
|---|---|---|---|---|
| Labour | R. Haynes | 1,392 | 47.8 | |
| Labour | E. Cornwall | 1,307 | 44.9 | |
| Labour | T. Vincent | 1,057 | 36.3 | |
| Conservative | R. Rose* | 998 | 34.3 | |
| Conservative | P. Rayna* | 974 | 33.5 | |
| Conservative | A. Woods | 963 | 33.1 | |
| Liberal Democrats | J. Myhill | 522 | 17.9 | |
| Turnout | | ~2,775 | 42.5 | |
| Registered electors | | 6,527 | | |
| Labour gain from Conservative | | | | |
| Labour gain from Independent | | | | |
| Labour gain from Conservative | | | | |

=== North Walsham West ===
North Walsham West
| Party | Candidate | Votes | % | ±% |
|---|---|---|---|---|
| Labour | P. Buck | 512 | 61.1 | |
| Independent | A. Millward | 271 | 32.3 | |
| Liberal Democrats | A. Verney | 55 | 6.6 | |
| Majority | | 241 | 28.8 | |
| Turnout | | 838 | 46.9 | |
| Registered electors | | 1,819 | | |
| Labour hold | | Swing | | |

=== Overstrand ===
Overstrand
| Party | Candidate | Votes | % | ±% |
|---|---|---|---|---|
| Independent | J. Fathers | 245 | 37.3 | |
| Liberal Democrats | G. Duniam | 172 | 26.2 | |
| Labour | J. Midgley | 131 | 19.9 | |
| Conservative | T. Oakley | 109 | 16.6 | |
| Majority | | 73 | 11.1 | |
| Turnout | | 657 | 59.9 | |
| Registered electors | | 1,105 | | |
| Independent gain from Conservative | | Swing | | |

=== Pastonacres ===
Pastonacres
| Party | Candidate | Votes | % | ±% |
|---|---|---|---|---|
| Liberal Democrats | D. Venvell | 331 | 43.4 | |
| Independent | P. Hammond | 252 | 33.1 | |
| Labour | C. Buck | 179 | 23.5 | |
| Majority | | 79 | 10.4 | |
| Turnout | | 762 | 55.4 | |
| Registered electors | | 1,383 | | |
| Liberal Democrats hold | | Swing | | |

=== Roughton ===
Roughton
| Party | Candidate | Votes | % | ±% |
|---|---|---|---|---|
| Labour | A. Davies | 492 | 44.4 | |
| Liberal Democrats | V. Purdy | 317 | 28.6 | |
| Independent | W. Arnold* | 231 | 20.8 | |
| Green | P. Crouch | 68 | 6.1 | |
| Majority | | 175 | 15.8 | |
| Turnout | | 1,108 | 53.3 | |
| Registered electors | | 2,094 | | |
| Labour gain from Conservative | | Swing | | |

=== Scottow ===
Scottow
| Party | Candidate | Votes | % | ±% |
|---|---|---|---|---|
| Labour | M. Cullingham* | 389 | 71.2 | |
| Liberal Democrats | P. Jones | 157 | 28.8 | |
| Majority | | 232 | 42.5 | |
| Turnout | | 546 | 34.4 | |
| Registered electors | | 1,609 | | |
| Labour hold | | Swing | | |

=== Sheringham ===
Sheringham (3 seats)
| Party | Candidate | Votes | % | ±% |
|---|---|---|---|---|
| Liberal Democrats | A. Dennis* | 1,146 | 35.9 | |
| Liberal Democrats | H. Nelson | 934 | 29.3 | |
| Conservative | L. McGinn* | 889 | 27.8 | |
| Liberal Democrats | G. Simmons | 709 | 22.2 | |
| Conservative | E. Harvey | 671 | 21.0 | |
| Independent | J. Nichols | 647 | 20.2 | |
| Labour | P. Harding | 514 | 16.1 | |
| Labour | D. Seymour | 449 | 14.1 | |
| Independent | B. Alton* | 382 | 12.0 | |
| Turnout | | ~2,531 | 46.3 | |
| Registered electors | | 5,464 | | |
| Liberal Democrats hold | | | | |
| Liberal Democrats gain from Conservative | | | | |
| Conservative hold | | | | |

=== Stalham ===
Stalham
| Party | Candidate | Votes | % | ±% |
|---|---|---|---|---|
| Labour | M. French | 557 | 48.0 | |
| Independent | N. Wright | 369 | 31.8 | |
| Liberal Democrats | P. Harradine | 235 | 20.2 | |
| Majority | | 188 | 16.2 | |
| Turnout | | 1,161 | 49.3 | |
| Registered electors | | 2,338 | | |
| Labour gain from Conservative | | Swing | | |

=== Suffield Park ===
Suffield Park
| Party | Candidate | Votes | % | ±% |
|---|---|---|---|---|
| Independent | V. Woodcock* | Unopposed | | |
| Registered electors | | 1,686 | | |
| Independent hold | | | | |

=== The Raynhams ===
The Raynhams
| Party | Candidate | Votes | % | ±% |
|---|---|---|---|---|
| Labour | P. Kemp | 269 | 50.9 | |
| Independent | K. Barrow | 163 | 30.8 | |
| Liberal Democrats | O. Towers | 97 | 18.3 | |
| Majority | | 106 | 20.0 | |
| Turnout | | 529 | 34.1 | |
| Registered electors | | 1,553 | | |
| Labour gain from Independent | | Swing | | |

=== The Runtons ===
The Runtons (2 seats)
| Party | Candidate | Votes | % | ±% |
|---|---|---|---|---|
| Liberal Democrats | G. Craske* | 709 | 50.0 | |
| Liberal Democrats | J. Crampsie | 539 | 38.0 | |
| Conservative | P. Caswell* | 480 | 33.9 | |
| Conservative | A. Lee | 424 | 30.0 | |
| Labour | B. Vanlint | 228 | 16.1 | |
| Turnout | | ~1,329 | 52.8 | |
| Registered electors | | 2,515 | | |
| Liberal Democrats hold | | | | |
| Liberal Democrats gain from Conservative | | | | |

=== Walsingham ===
Walsingham
| Party | Candidate | Votes | % | ±% |
|---|---|---|---|---|
| Independent | T. Moore* | 444 | 78.0 | |
| Labour | A. Dick | 125 | 22.0 | |
| Majority | | 319 | 56.1 | |
| Turnout | | 569 | 50.2 | |
| Registered electors | | 1,134 | | |
| Independent hold | | Swing | | |

=== Wells ===
Wells (2 seats)
| Party | Candidate | Votes | % | ±% |
|---|---|---|---|---|
| Labour | M. Gates* | 649 | 42.2 | |
| Labour | A. Benstead | 554 | 36.0 | |
| Independent | D. Hudson | 464 | 30.1 | |
| Liberal Democrats | A. Nightingale | 426 | 27.7 | |
| Turnout | | ~1,267 | 52.0 | |
| Registered electors | | 2,436 | | |
| Labour hold | | | | |
| Labour gain from Conservative | | | | |

=== Wensum Valley ===
Wensum Valley
| Party | Candidate | Votes | % | ±% |
|---|---|---|---|---|
| Labour | T. Potter | 360 | 43.6 | |
| Independent | K. Perowne* | 284 | 34.4 | |
| Liberal Democrats | C. Lee | 181 | 21.9 | |
| Majority | | 76 | 9.2 | |
| Turnout | | 825 | 56.9 | |
| Registered electors | | 1,461 | | |
| Labour gain from Independent | | Swing | | |

=== Worstead ===
Worstead
| Party | Candidate | Votes | % | ±% |
|---|---|---|---|---|
| Labour | S. Shaw* | 554 | 70.3 | |
| Independent | T. Hardingham | 172 | 21.8 | |
| Liberal Democrats | C. Wilkins | 62 | 7.9 | |
| Majority | | 382 | 48.5 | |
| Turnout | | 788 | 55.3 | |
| Registered electors | | 1,429 | | |
| Labour hold | | Swing | | |
