= 1973 Pastonacres District Council election =

UK local election

- 10 May 1973

All 47 seats to Pastonacres District Council 24 seats needed for a majority

	First party	Second party	Third party
Party	Independent	Conservative	Labour
Seats won	37	6	4
Popular vote	21,515	5,393	6,824
Percentage	63.8%	16.0%	20.2%
Council control after election
Independent

The 1973 Pastonacres District Council election took place on 10 May 1973 to elect members of Pastonacres District Council in Norfolk, England. This was on the same day as other local elections.

This was the inaugural election to the council following its creation by the Local Government Act 1972. Between the 1973 and 1976 elections, the council was renamed to North Norfolk District Council.

== Summary ==
=== Election result ===
1973 Pastonacres District Council election
Party	Candidates	Seats	Gains	Losses	Net gain/loss	Seats %	Votes %	Votes	+/−
Independent	69	37	N/A	N/A	N/A	78.7	63.8	21,515	N/A
Conservative	9	6	N/A	N/A	N/A	12.8	16.0	5,393	N/A
Labour	26	4	N/A	N/A	N/A	8.5	20.2	6,824	N/A
