= 2003 North Norfolk District Council election =

North Norfolk District Council election

- 1 May 2003

All 48 seats to North Norfolk District Council 25 seats needed for a majority

	First party	Second party
Party	Liberal Democrats	Conservative
Seats won	28	14
Seat change	▲16	Steady
Popular vote	13,770	13,979
Percentage	37.5%	38.1%
Swing	▲8.3%	▲8.1%
	Third party	Fourth party
Party	Independent	Labour
Seats won	6	0
Seat change	▼4	▼10
Popular vote	5,640	2,693
Percentage	15.4%	7.3%
Swing	▼2.6%	▼15.5%
Control before election
No overall control
Control after election
Liberal Democrats

The 2003 North Norfolk District Council election took place on 1 May 2003 to elect members of North Norfolk District Council in England. This was on the same day as other local elections.

The council was contested on new ward boundaries and the number of seats increased by 2 to 48.

== Summary ==
=== Election result ===
2003 North Norfolk District Council election
Party	Candidates	Seats	Gains	Losses	Net gain/loss	Seats %	Votes %	Votes	+/−
Liberal Democrats	48	28	N/A	N/A	▲16	58.3	42.0	20,836	+10.3
Conservative	44	14	N/A	N/A	Steady	29.2	37.5	18,575	+6.5
Independent	19	6	N/A	N/A	▼4	12.5	13.2	6,538	+0.5
Labour	13	0	N/A	N/A	▼10	0.0	5.8	2,876	–18.7
Green	14	0	N/A	N/A	Steady	0.0	1.5	744	N/A

== Ward results ==
Incumbent councillors standing for re-election are marked with an asterisk (*). Changes in seats do not take into account by-elections or defections.

=== Astley ===
Astley
Party	Candidate	Votes	%	±%
Independent	Richard Broughton*	349	42.9	
Conservative	James Howlett	267	32.8	
Liberal Democrats	John Pike	144	17.7	
Green	Monika Wiedmann	54	6.6	
Majority		82	10.1	
Turnout		814	46.6	
Registered electors		1,747		
Independent gain from Liberal Democrats		Swing		

=== Briston ===
Briston
Party	Candidate	Votes	%
Liberal Democrats	John Wyatt*	455	64.3
Conservative	Susan Edwards	229	32.3
Green	Sharon Harvey	24	3.4
Majority		226	31.9
Turnout		709	42.8
Registered electors		1,656	
Liberal Democrats win (new seat)			

=== Chaucer ===
Chaucer
Party	Candidate	Votes	%	±%
Liberal Democrats	John Sweeney*	454	49.2	
Conservative	David Heathcote	423	45.9	
Green	Victoria Wood	45	4.9	
Majority		31	3.4	
Turnout		927	48.6	
Registered electors		1,907		
Liberal Democrats hold		Swing		

=== Corpusty ===
Corpusty
Party	Candidate	Votes	%	±%
Conservative	John Perry-Warnes*	560	55.7	
Labour	Aubrey Poberefsky*	330	32.8	
Liberal Democrats	Raymond Swain	115	11.4	
Majority		230	22.9	
Turnout		1,005	53.8	
Registered electors		1,876		
Conservative gain from Labour		Swing		

=== Cromer Town ===
Cromer Town (2 seats)
Party	Candidate	Votes	%
Conservative	Laurence Randall*	558	52.5
Conservative	Thomas Cabbell Manners*	529	49.8
Liberal Democrats	Peter Baldwin	272	25.6
Liberal Democrats	Paul Corney	210	19.8
Labour	Colin Vanlint	179	16.9
Independent	George Foster	123	11.6
Turnout		~1,062	33.6
Registered electors		3,158	
Conservative win (new seat)			
Conservative win (new seat)			

=== Erpingham ===
Erpingham
Party	Candidate	Votes	%	±%
Conservative	Peter Willcox	479	57.0	
Liberal Democrats	John Stibbons	239	28.5	
Labour	Ann Poberefsky	122	14.5	
Majority		240	28.6	
Turnout		840	46.1	
Registered electors		1,821		
Conservative gain from Labour		Swing		

=== Gaunt ===
Gaunt
Party	Candidate	Votes	%
Liberal Democrats	Graham Jones	437	49.4
Conservative	Judith Oliver	307	34.7
Independent	Clyte Venvell	141	15.9
Majority		130	14.7
Turnout		885	48.5
Registered electors		1,834	
Liberal Democrats win (new seat)			

=== Glaven Valley ===
Glaven Valley
Party	Candidate	Votes	%
Conservative	Bernard Crowe*	623	65.6
Liberal Democrats	Anthony Groom	275	28.9
Green	Rupert Rosser	52	5.5
Majority		348	36.6
Turnout		950	50.6
Registered electors		1,891	
Conservative win (new seat)			

=== Happisburgh ===
Happisburgh
Party	Candidate	Votes	%	±%
Liberal Democrats	Michael Hammond	349	45.4	
Conservative	James Croft	344	44.7	
Green	Paul Saunders	76	9.9	
Majority		5	0.7	
Turnout		769	40.1	
Registered electors		1,933		
Liberal Democrats gain from Independent		Swing		

=== High Heath ===
High Heath
Party	Candidate	Votes	%
Liberal Democrats	Henry Cordeaux*	504	50.9
Conservative	Nicholas Deterding	438	44.2
Green	Rosalind Redfern	49	4.9
Majority		66	6.7
Turnout		991	60.7
Registered electors		1,633	
Liberal Democrats win (new seat)			

=== Holt ===
Holt (2 seats)
Party	Candidate	Votes	%
Independent	Michael Baker*	823	54.8
Liberal Democrats	Ronald Stone*	506	33.7
Conservative	John Blyth	463	30.8
Liberal Democrats	Robin Combe	432	28.8
Independent	Philip High	414	27.6
Green	Paula D'Attoma	61	4.1
Green	Alicia Hull	41	2.7
Turnout		~1,501	52.3
Registered electors		2,868	
Independent win (new seat)			
Liberal Democrats win (new seat)			

=== Hoveton ===
Hoveton
Party	Candidate	Votes	%	±%
Conservative	Rita Massingham*	613	75.9	
Liberal Democrats	Alexandrine Howe	195	24.1	
Majority		418	51.7	
Turnout		808	47.1	
Registered electors		1,725		
Conservative hold		Swing		

=== Lancaster North ===
Lancaster North (2 seats)
Party	Candidate	Votes	%
Liberal Democrats	Nicholas Starling	720	62.7
Liberal Democrats	Simon Wright	649	56.5
Conservative	Michael Reynolds	252	21.9
Labour	Janet Holdom	210	18.3
Independent	Philip Kemp*	190	16.5
Green	Vanessa Jarvis	52	4.5
Turnout		~1,149	40.4
Registered electors		2,845	
Liberal Democrats win (new seat)			
Liberal Democrats win (new seat)			

=== Lancaster South ===
Lancaster South (2 seats)
Party	Candidate	Votes	%
Liberal Democrats	Simon Towers	453	42.1
Liberal Democrats	Jacqueline Howe	452	42.0
Conservative	Roy Banham*	410	38.1
Conservative	James Spencer Ashworth	345	32.0
Labour	Brenda Coldrick*	189	17.6
Labour	Desmond Hewitt*	183	17.0
Turnout		~1,077	34.3
Registered electors		3,137	
Liberal Democrats win (new seat)			
Liberal Democrats win (new seat)			

=== Mundesley ===
Mundesley (2 seats)
Party	Candidate	Votes	%	±%
Conservative	Wyndham Northam*	903	67.7	
Independent	Susan Willis*	704	52.7	
Liberal Democrats	Steven Farmer	269	20.1	
Liberal Democrats	Nicholas John	253	19.0	
Turnout		~1,335	40.9	
Registered electors		3,263		
Conservative hold				
Independent win (new seat)				

=== North Walsham East ===
North Walsham East (2 seats)
Party	Candidate	Votes	%
Liberal Democrats	Peter Moore	640	46.9
Liberal Democrats	Patricia Ford	603	44.2
Conservative	Rita Rose*	451	33.0
Conservative	Susan Williamson	381	27.9
Labour	George Nelson	174	12.7
Independent	Graham Dunn	172	12.6
Independent	Charles Cole	104	7.6
Turnout		~1,367	41.5
Registered electors		3,293	
Liberal Democrats win (new seat)			
Liberal Democrats win (new seat)			

=== North Walsham North ===
North Walsham North (2 seats)
Party	Candidate	Votes	%
Liberal Democrats	Joe Turner	625	55.8
Liberal Democrats	Julie Thompson	615	54.9
Conservative	Arthur Vincent	295	26.4
Conservative	Donna McDougall	271	24.2
Independent	Roy Haynes*	264	23.6
Turnout		~1,117	34.5
Registered electors		3,237	
Liberal Democrats win (new seat)			
Liberal Democrats win (new seat)			

=== North Walsham West ===
North Walsham West (2 seats)
Party	Candidate	Votes	%
Liberal Democrats	Mark Birch*	773	59.8
Liberal Democrats	Virginia Gay	652	50.5
Conservative	Natasha Sherry	301	23.3
Conservative	Arthur Stimpson	290	22.5
Labour	Paul Buck	282	21.9
Turnout		~1,286	41.5
Registered electors		3,098	
Liberal Democrats win (new seat)			
Liberal Democrats win (new seat)			

=== Poppyland ===
Poppyland
Party	Candidate	Votes	%
Conservative	Angela Tillett	361	39.5
Independent	Judith Fathers*	357	39.1
Liberal Democrats	John Barker	123	13.5
Labour	Michael Cox	73	8.0
Majority		4	0.4
Turnout		919	50.2
Registered electors		1,831	
Conservative win (new seat)			

=== Priory ===
Priory (2 seats)
Party	Candidate	Votes	%
Liberal Democrats	Joyce Trett*	715	42.4
Conservative	Jonathan Savory	700	41.5
Conservative	Charles Tucker	576	34.2
Liberal Democrats	Tom Lynch	540	32.1
Labour	Michael Gates*	404	24.0
Green	Rosemary Amesbury	87	5.2
Green	George Benny	65	3.9
Turnout		~1,686	48.4
Registered electors		3,483	
Liberal Democrats win (new seat)			
Conservative win (new seat)			

=== Roughton ===
Roughton
Party	Candidate	Votes	%	±%
Conservative	Susan Arnold	342	41.5	
Liberal Democrats	Colin Harrold*	268	32.5	
Labour	David Spencer*	215	26.1	
Majority		74	9.0	
Turnout		825	47.1	
Registered electors		1,757		
Conservative gain from Liberal Democrats		Swing		

=== Scottow ===
Scottow
Party	Candidate	Votes	%	±%
Independent	Cyril Durrant*	212	37.3	
Liberal Democrats	Patrick Wilkins*	200	35.2	
Conservative	Michael Wright	156	27.5	
Majority		12	2.1	
Turnout		568	33.3	
Registered electors		1,704		
Independent gain from Liberal Democrats		Swing		

=== Sheringham North ===
Sheringham North (2 seats)
Party	Candidate	Votes	%
Liberal Democrats	Brian Hannah*	777	66.3
Liberal Democrats	Susan Pointer	678	57.8
Conservative	Gillian Gibbs	446	38.0
Conservative	Alistair Mackay	387	33.0
Turnout		~1,210	40.7
Registered electors		2,972	
Liberal Democrats win (new seat)			
Liberal Democrats win (new seat)			

=== Sheringham South ===
Sheringham South (2 seats)
Party	Candidate	Votes	%
Liberal Democrats	Hilary Nelson*	720	63.4
Liberal Democrats	Clive Fenn	706	62.1
Conservative	Lionel McGinn*	493	43.4
Conservative	Michael Lauterback	422	37.1
Turnout		~1,249	42.6
Registered electors		2,931	
Liberal Democrats win (new seat)			
Liberal Democrats win (new seat)			

=== St Benet ===
St Benet
Party	Candidate	Votes	%
Conservative	Colin Haddow*	384	44.6
Independent	Christopher How	352	40.9
Liberal Democrats	Pamela Corney	125	14.5
Majority		32	3.7
Turnout		861	48.9
Registered electors		1,770	
Conservative win (new seat)			

=== Stalham & Sutton ===
Stalham & Sutton (2 seats)
Party	Candidate	Votes	%
Conservative	George Barran	525	40.3
Liberal Democrats	Candy Sheridan	427	32.8
Conservative	Carolyn Williams	422	32.4
Labour	Michael Cullingham*	417	32.0
Liberal Democrats	Shirley Partridge	366	28.1
Turnout		~1,306	39.3
Registered electors		3,323	
Conservative win (new seat)			
Liberal Democrats win (new seat)			

=== Suffield Park ===
Suffield Park (2 seats)
Party	Candidate	Votes	%	±%
Conservative	Daniel Platton	683	48.0	
Conservative	Nigel Ripley	604	42.4	
Independent	Vera Woodcock*	477	33.5	
Liberal Democrats	Richard Harbord	362	25.4	
Liberal Democrats	Julian Gould	347	24.4	
Independent	Leslie Hawkes	247	17.4	
Independent	Yvonne Nolan	133	9.3	
Turnout		~1,502	46.2	
Registered electors		3,250		
Conservative gain from Independent				
Conservative win (new seat)				

=== The Raynhams ===
The Raynhams
Party	Candidate	Votes	%	±%
Liberal Democrats	Sidney Welsh	327	47.2	
Conservative	Henry Thompson	268	38.7	
Labour	Ian Brockbank	98	14.1	
Majority		59	8.5	
Turnout		693	36.7	
Registered electors		1,889		
Liberal Democrats gain from Labour		Swing		

=== The Runtons ===
The Runtons
Party	Candidate	Votes	%	±%
Liberal Democrats	Margaret Craske*	458	52.3	
Conservative	Danny Rowe*	378	43.2	
Green	Alan Marett	39	4.5	
Majority		80	9.1	
Turnout		875	50.4	
Registered electors		1,746		
Liberal Democrats gain from Conservative		Swing		

=== Walsingham ===
Walsingham
Party	Candidate	Votes	%	±%
Independent	Thomas Moore*	622	81.3	
Liberal Democrats	Alexander Chapman	143	18.7	
Majority		479	62.6	
Turnout		765	41.4	
Registered electors		1,860		
Independent hold		Swing		

=== Waterside ===
Waterside (2 seats)
Party	Candidate	Votes	%
Liberal Democrats	Simon Partridge	781	52.8
Liberal Democrats	Eric Stockton	563	38.1
Independent	Keith Bacon*	545	36.8
Conservative	Colin Robertshaw	459	31.0
Conservative	Jean Eldred	369	24.9
Turnout		~1,517	43.0
Registered electors		3,526	
Liberal Democrats win (new seat)			
Liberal Democrats win (new seat)			

=== Waxham ===
Waxham
Party	Candidate	Votes	%
Independent	Daniel Corbett*	309	46.5
Conservative	Alan Duncan	206	31.0
Liberal Democrats	Stephanie Harrison	106	16.0
Green	Rosemary Breame	43	6.5
Majority		103	15.5
Turnout		664	38.7
Registered electors		1,716	
Independent win (new seat)			

=== Wensum ===
Wensum
Party	Candidate	Votes	%
Liberal Democrats	Ann Green	441	53.4
Conservative	Derek Baxter*	329	39.8
Green	Timothy Doncaster	56	6.8
Majority		112	13.6
Turnout		826	46.3
Registered electors		1,792	
Liberal Democrats win (new seat)			

=== Worstead ===
Worstead
Party	Candidate	Votes	%	±%
Liberal Democrats	Catherine Wilkins*	372	52.8	
Conservative	Nicholas Pegge	333	47.2	
Majority		39	5.5	
Turnout		705	40.3	
Registered electors		1,773		
Liberal Democrats hold		Swing		

== By-elections ==
Astley By-Election 10 July 2003
Party	Candidate	Votes	%	±%
Liberal Democrats	Robin Combe	441	51.5	+33.8
Conservative		346	40.4	+7.6
Independent		38	4.4	N/A
Labour		32	3.7	N/A
Majority		95	11.1	
Turnout		857	48.7	
Liberal Democrats gain from Independent		Swing		

Happisburgh By-Election 6 November 2003
Party	Candidate	Votes	%	±%
Liberal Democrats	Susan Stockton	619	61.0	+15.6
Conservative	James Croft	372	36.7	−8.0
Green	Rosemary Breame	24	2.4	−7.5
Majority		247	24.3	
Turnout		1,015	51.9	
Liberal Democrats hold		Swing		

St Benet By-Election 22 February 2005
Party	Candidate	Votes	%	±%
Liberal Democrats	Barbara McGoun	576	50.1	+35.6
Conservative	Christopher How	537	46.7	+2.1
Labour	David Spencer	36	3.1	N/A
Majority		39	3.4	
Turnout		1,149	65.0	
Liberal Democrats gain from Conservative		Swing		

Chaucer By-Election 8 September 2005
Party	Candidate	Votes	%	±%
Liberal Democrats	Anthea Sweeney	490	53.4	+4.2
Conservative	David Heathcote	395	43.1	−2.8
Labour	David Thompson	32	3.5	N/A
Majority		95	10.3	
Turnout		917	48.0	
Liberal Democrats hold		Swing		

Holt By-Election 7 June 2006
Party	Candidate	Votes	%	±%
Liberal Democrats	Philip High	885	56.6	+29.0
Conservative	John Blyth	637	40.8	+9.9
Labour	Desmond Hewitt	41	2.6	N/A
Majority		248	15.8	
Turnout		1,563	54.1	
Liberal Democrats hold		Swing		
