= John Stubbe =

John Stubbe may refer to:

- John Stubbs or Stubbe, pamphleteer
- John Stubbe (MP) for Great Yarmouth (UK Parliament constituency)
