= Sibylle Boys =

English literary patron

Sibylle, Lady Boys
- Born: Sibylle Illey c. 1370; Plumstead Parva?
- Died: after 1455
- Occupations: noblewoman, estate manager
- Known for: landowner
- Spouse: Roger Boys
- Children: yes

Sibylle Boys born Sibylle Illey aka Sibylle, Lady Boys (c. 1370 – after 1455) was an English literary patron.

== Life ==
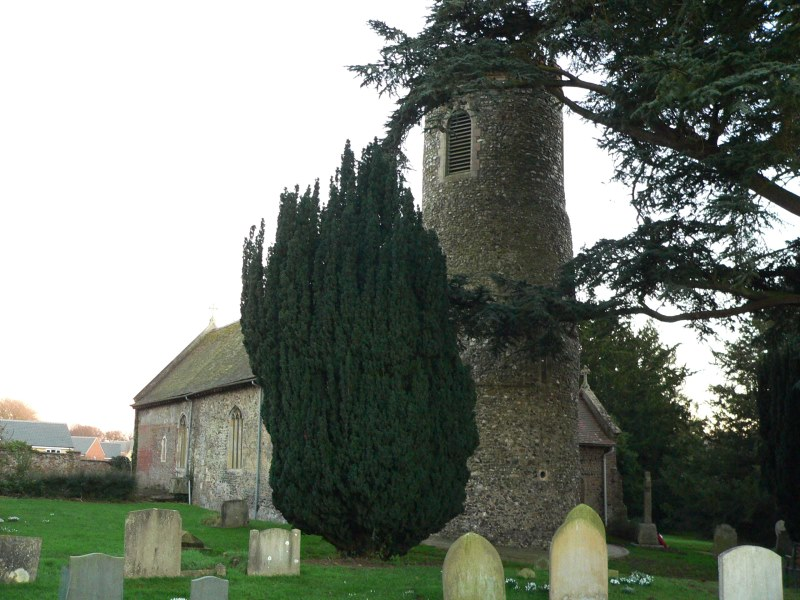
The church of the saintly twins, St Gervase and St Protase in her father's village is still extant

Boys' birth is estimated to be 1370 based on an estimate of her age eight years later. She was the daughter of Katherine Gymyngham and Sir Robert Illey of Plumstead Parva.

She married Sir Roger Boys of Honing and Ingham and they had two sons.

Her mother died in 1417 leaving a will that said her inheritance was "provided she behave herself civilly, and did not disturb her executors".

One of her sons, Thomas, died in 1432 and in 1444 her other son, Robert, gave her his power of attorney and he died six years later, leaving a widow, Jane Boys, and a daughter, Katherine. Jane was promised to an administrator named Richard Southwell, but before the marriage could take place she was taken by Robert Langstrother. It retaliation Southwell took possession of the manor of Holme Hale in 1451. Researchers are divided as to whether Jane went willingly with Langstrother to avoid a forced marriage to Southwell, or whether Southwell was the would-be rescuer of Jane taken by force by Langstrother. At the time Sibylle Boys set off for London to claim restitution from the King and his Lords.

She is known to have commissioned two minor poems from the poet John Lydgate these were Epistle to Sibille and Tretise for lauandres.

It is said that Jack Cade's Rebellion's rebellion in 1450 may have added to Boys' poor health as this was the reason why she was unable to attempt a pilgrimage to Rome in 1451. She was concerned about her soul as she mortgaged her manor and the advowsons of the Holme Hale churches to get an obit to be said every year. She had been accused of forgery to deny her son's estate to his widow and she was also accused of not telling the truth.
