= Appian =

Greco-Roman historian (c. 95 – c. 165)

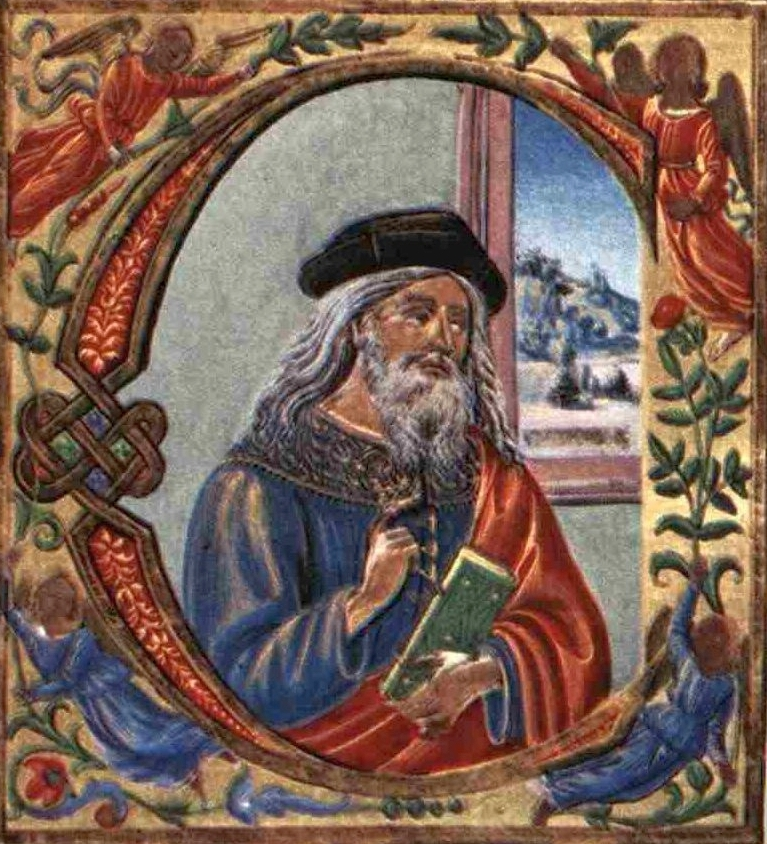
- Imaginary portrait from a page of the Latin translation of Appian's Roman History by Pier Candido Decembrio (detail)
- Born: Appianus Alexandrinus c. 95; Alexandria, Roman Egypt
- Died: c. 165 (aged around 70); Rome
- Occupations: Historian, lawyer

Appian of Alexandria (/ˈæpiən/; Ancient Greek: Ἀππιανὸς Ἀλεξανδρεύς, romanized: Appianòs Alexandreús; Latin: Appianus Alexandrinus; c. 95 – c. AD 165) was a Greek historian with Roman citizenship who prospered during the reigns of the Roman Emperors Trajan, Hadrian, and Antoninus Pius.

He was born c. 95 in Alexandria. After holding the senior offices in the province of Aegyptus (Egypt), he went to Rome c. 120, where he practiced as an advocate, pleading cases before the emperors (probably as advocatus fisci, an important official of the imperial treasury). It was in 147 at the earliest that he was appointed to the office of procurator, probably in Egypt, on the recommendation of his friend Marcus Cornelius Fronto, an influential rhetorician and advocate. Because the position of procurator was open only to members of the equestrian order (the "knightly" class), his possession of this office tells us about Appian's family background.

His principal surviving work (Ρωμαϊκά Romaiká, known in Latin as Historia Romana and in English as Roman History) was written in Greek in 24 books, before 165. This work more closely resembles a series of monographs than a connected history. It gives an account of various peoples and countries from the earliest times down to their incorporation into the Roman Empire, and survives in complete books and considerable fragments. The work is very valuable, especially for the period of the civil wars.

The Civil Wars, books 13–17 of the Roman History, concern mainly the end of the Roman Republic and take a conflict-based view and approach to history. Despite the lack of cited sources for his works, these books of the Roman History are the only extant comprehensive description of these momentous decades of Roman history. The other extant work of Appian is his "The Foreign Wars", which includes an ethnographic style history recounting the various military conflicts against a foreign enemy in Roman history, until the time of Appian.

== Life ==
Little is known of the life of Appian of Alexandria. He wrote an autobiography that has been almost completely lost. Information about Appian is distilled from his own writings and a letter by his friend Cornelius Fronto. However, it is certain that Appian was born around the year AD 95 in Alexandria, the capital of Roman Egypt. Since his parents were Roman citizens capable of paying for their son's education, it can be inferred that Appian belonged to the wealthy upper classes.

It is believed that Appian moved to Rome in 120, where he became a lawyer. In the introduction to his Roman History, he boasts "that he pleaded cases in Rome before the emperors." The emperors he claims to have addressed must have been either Hadrian or Marcus Aurelius and definitely Antoninus Pius, for Appian remained in Egypt at least until the end of the reign of Trajan (117). In the letter of Cornelius Fronto, it is revealed that a request on behalf of Appian to receive the rank of procurator occurred during the co-regency of Marcus Aurelius and his brother Lucius Verus between 147 and 161. Although Appian won this office, it is unclear whether it was a real job or an honorific title. The only other certain biographical datum is that Appian's Roman History appeared sometime before 162. This is one of the few primary historical sources for the period.

== Works ==
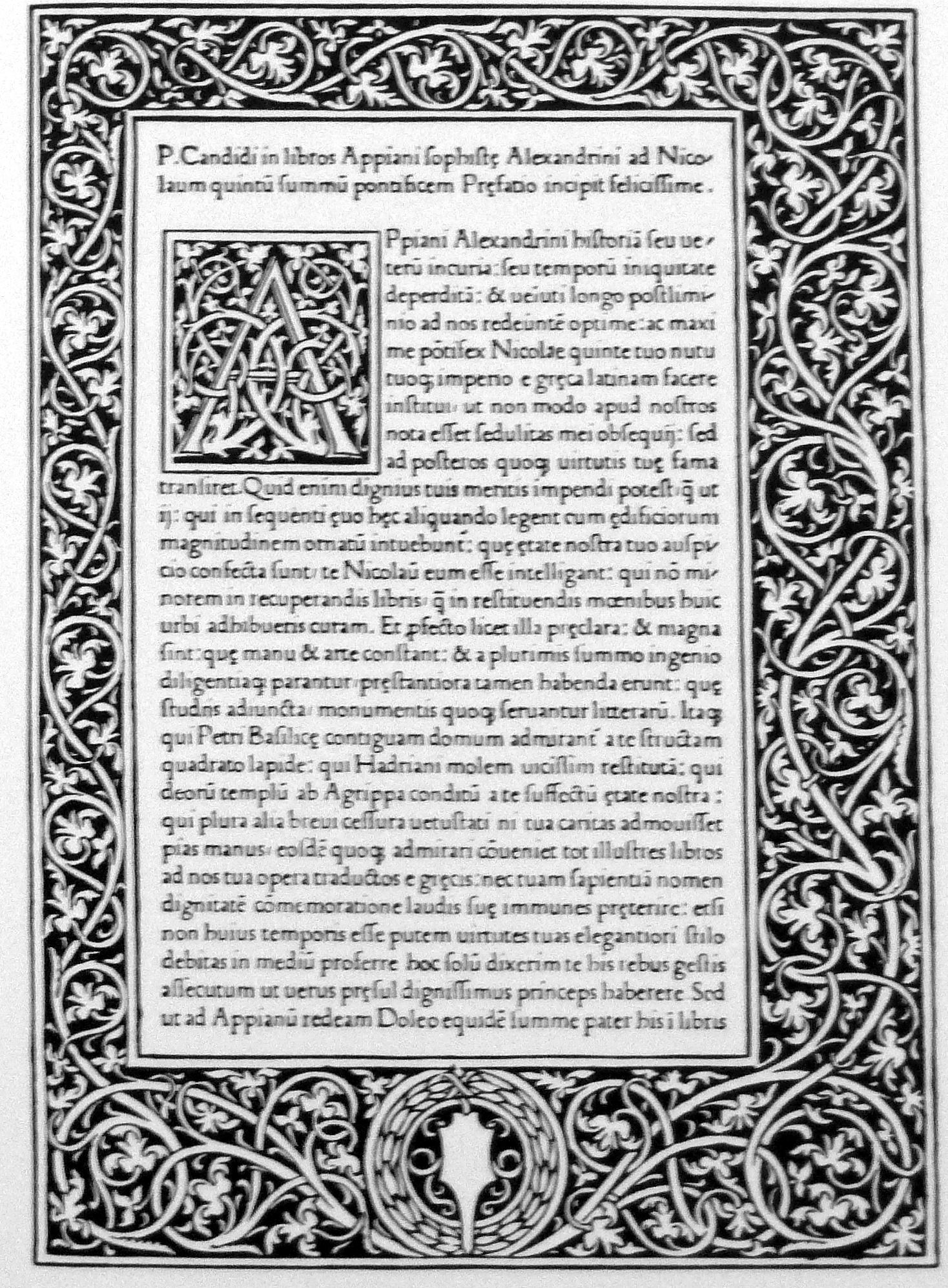
Appian: Historia Romana. Printed in Venice 1477 by Erhard Ratdolt

=== Appian's Roman History and The Civil Wars ===
Appian began writing his history around the middle of the second century AD. Only sections from half of the original 24 books survive today of a much larger history known as The Roman History, namely books 6-7, much of 8, 9, and 11, and 12-17 (only fragments of books 1-5 and of the remainder of 8 and 9 are preserved, while books 10 and 18-24 are lost entirely). The section of this history known as The Civil Wars comprises books 13–17 of the original 24 of the Roman History. This history narrates the history of the Romans from the time of the Gracchan tribunates, through the civil wars of Marius, Sulla, Caesar and Pompey, to break off in the time of the Second Triumvirate. These five books stand out because they are one of the few comprehensive histories available on the transition of the Roman state from Republic to Empire and the ensuing civil and military strife.

Besides Appian, this period is also covered by a handful of ancient authors with varying degrees of detail and viewpoints. The commentaries of Julius Caesar record his personal, mainly military, observations of the Gallic Wars. Plutarch's Roman biographies sketch the lives of the major leaders of the late Republican period, recording events Plutarch thought interesting and give only a perfunctory explanation of historic events. The Roman author Velleius' history examines Roman history from the city's foundation until AD 29. This history is more detailed in the late Republic and early Empire period, while the earlier history is condensed. The Epitome of Roman History by Florus, also covers Roman history from mythical times until the 5th century AD in an extremely condensed format. The history of Diodorus of Sicily also covers Roman history until the Gallic Wars, but his history becomes fragmentary after around 300 BC. Cassius Dio also covers this time period as well though he lived later. He gives a comprehensive history of this time as well as insights into the personal traits of the main participants.

=== The Foreign Wars ===
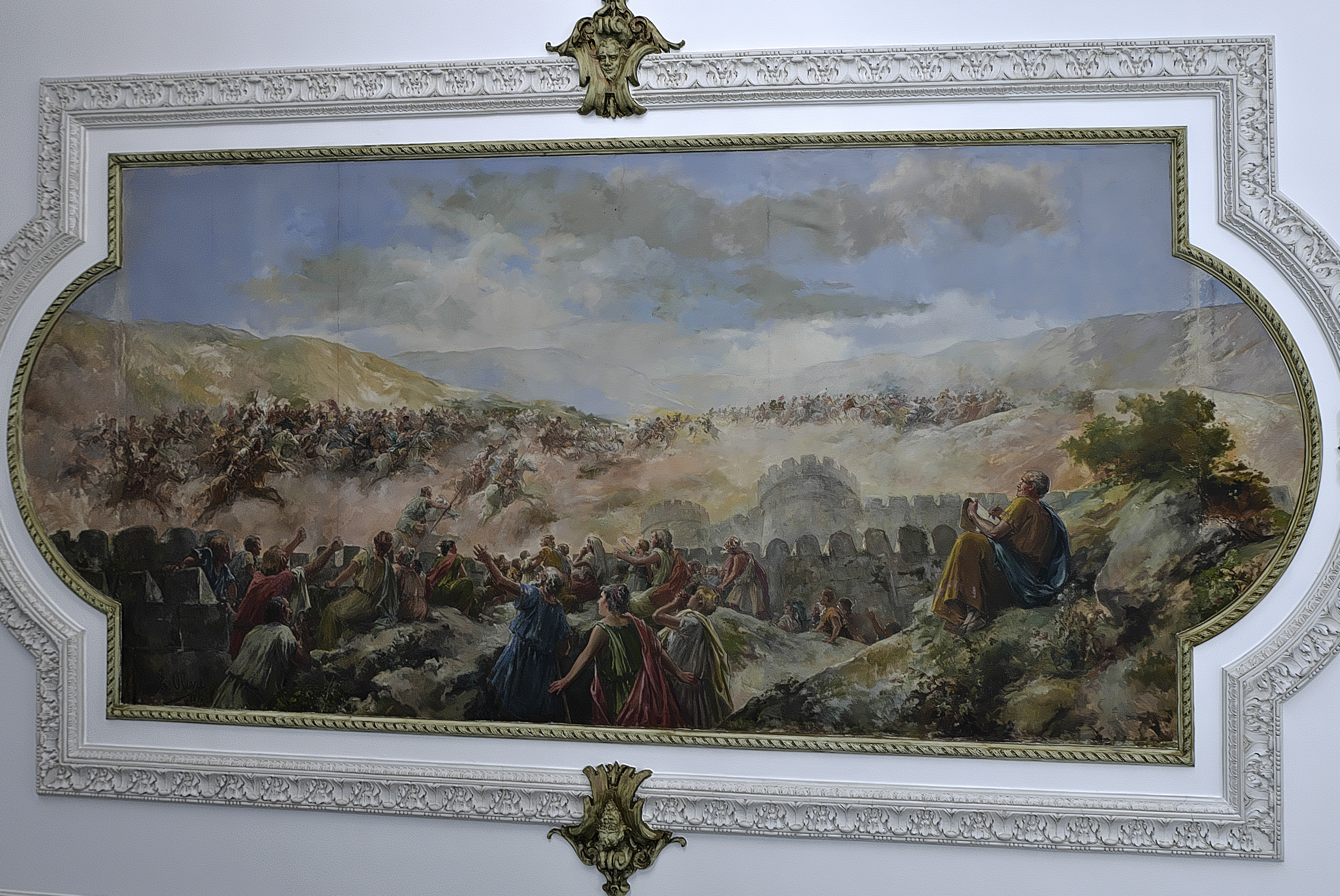
Painting by Eugenio Oliva depicting the Vaccaei going out to defend Palencia from the troops of Lucius Licinius Lucullus in 151 BC. The historian Appian is depicted at right recording events; this is a poetic fiction, as Appian was writing from a standpoint three centuries in the future.

Another work of Appian's history which still survives mostly extant is called The Foreign Wars. This history describes the wars the Romans fought against other cultures throughout their history. The mostly extant work narrates the wars in Spain (book 6), the Punic Wars in both Italy and Africa (books 7 and 8), the wars against the Seleucid Empire (book 11), and the Mithridatic Wars (book 12). Several small fragments also survive, describing the early Roman Kingdom (book 1) and the wars against the central Italians (book 2), Samnites (book 3), Illyrians (book 9), Macedonians (book 9), Numidians (book 8), and the Gauls (book 4). Especially notable is this work's ethnographic structure. Appian most likely used this structure to facilitate his readers' orientation through the sequence of events, which are united only by their relationship to Rome. For example, the chapter on Spain recounts Roman history in Spain chronologically with the Romans' first intervention in Spain during the War with Hannibal. The book goes on to describe the Roman conquest of several regions of Spain, followed by their wars with Spanish tribes and the Numantine War. The chapter on Spain concludes with the war against Sertorius in roughly 61 BC. Likewise, the chapter on the Hannibalic wars only recounts the battles that took place on the Italian Peninsula during the second Punic war, while the chapters on the Punic War recount all the action that occurred in northern Africa during the first and second Punic war.

Of the books which are now entirely lost, book 10 described the wars in Greece and Ionia, books 18-21 discussed Egypt, book 22 covered the history of the Empire up to the reign of Trajan, book 23 covered Trajan's wars against the Dacians, the Jews, and the Parthians, and book 24 described his annexation of Arabia Petraea.

=== Sources ===
One might expect that a historical work covering nine centuries and countless different peoples would involve a multitude of sources from different periods. However, Appian's sources remain uncertain, as he only mentions the source of his information under special circumstances. He may have relied primarily on one author for each book, whom he did not follow uncritically, since Appian also used additional sources for precision and correction. At our present state of knowledge questions regarding Appian's sources cannot be resolved.

== Editions ==
- Appiani Alexandrini Historia Publio Candido interprete Ac praeterea Anonymi Compendium historiae ab excessu Constantini usque ad Ioannem XXIII (in Latin). World Digital Library. Archived from the original on 2020-07-28. (a translation of Appian's History into Latin)
- Editio princeps, 1551
- Schweighäuser, 1785
- Bekker, 1852
- Ludwig Mendelssohn, 1878–1905, Appiani Historia Romana, Bibliotheca Teubneriana
- Paul Goukowsky, 1997–, Appien. Histoire romaine (Greek text, French translation, notes), Collection Budé.
- Carsana, Chiara (ed.). Commento storico al libro II delle Guerre Civili di Appiano (parte I). Pisa: Edizioni ETS, 2007. 309 pp. (Pubblicazioni della Facoltà di Lettere e Filosofia dell'Università di Pavia, 116).

English translations

- W. B., 1578 (black letter) – possibly William Barker – used by Shakespeare
- J. D[avies], 1679
- Horace White, 2 vols., 1899 (Bohn's Classical Library);
- Book I edited by James Leigh Strachan-Davidson, 1902.
- Books XIII–XVII (Civil Wars), trans. John Carter, Penguin, Harmondsworth, 1996
