= Ralph Ramsey (disambiguation) =

Ralph Ramsey may refer to:

- Ralph Ramsey (died 1419), MP for Suffolk and Great Yarmouth
- Ralph Ramsey, TV character, see Lucy Ricardo
