= John Beketon =

English politician

John Beketon (fl. 1338–1405) was an English politician. He sat as MP for Great Yarmouth in 1386 and 1399.

He also served as bailiff of Yarmouth from Michaelmas 1338 till 1339, 1393 till 1394, 1397 till 1398 and 1403 till 1404.
