= Anthony Fell (politician) =

British politician (1914–1998)

Sir Anthony Fell

Member of Parliament for Great Yarmouth
- In office 1951–1966
- Preceded by: Ernest Kinghorn
- Succeeded by: Hugh Gray
- In office 1970–1983
- Preceded by: Hugh Gray
- Succeeded by: Michael Carttiss

Personal details
- Born: 18 May 1914 Kilbride, Scotland
- Died: 20 March 1998 (aged 83) Lambeth, London, England
- Party: Conservative
- Parent: David Mark Fell (father)
- Relatives: Sir Arthur Fell (grandfather); Michael Fell (son)

Sir Anthony Fell (18 May 1914 – 20 March 1998) was a British Conservative Party politician. He sat in the House of Commons for most of the years from 1951 to 1983.

== Early life ==
He was educated in New Zealand and at Bedford School. Fell married June Fell in 1938; the couple had two children, Michael Fell (born in 1939) and Patricia (born in 1940). Fell had a strong interest in the arts and encouraged and supported his son, Michael, in establishing himself as an artist.

== Political career ==
Fell first stood for Parliament in a by-election for the seat of Brigg in 1948, but was defeated by Labour's Lance Mallalieu. He stood in another by-election a year later for Hammersmith South, but was beaten by Thomas Williams, as he was in the 1950 General Election.

He was elected at the 1951 general election as Member of Parliament (MP) for Great Yarmouth, a seat which had been held at the start of the 20th century by his grandfather Sir Arthur Fell. In 1957 he resigned the Conservative whip along with eight other Conservative Members of Parliament in protest at the reopening of the Suez Canal under Egyptian ownership. Yarmouth returned him to the Commons at three further elections. At the 1966 general election, Labour's Hugh Gray won the seat, with a majority of 797.

Fell regained the seat at the 1970 general election, with a majority of over 3,000, and retained it through three further elections until he retired, aged 69, at the 1983 general election. He was knighted in 1982. His successor was Michael Carttiss, another Conservative.

Fell was a member of the Conservative Monday Club.

Parliament of the United Kingdom
Preceded by Ernest Kinghorn	Member of Parliament for Yarmouth; 1951–1966	Succeeded by Hugh Gray
Preceded by Hugh Gray	Member of Parliament for Yarmouth; 1970–1983	Succeeded by Michael Carttiss (for Great Yarmouth)
