= Edward Owner =

English politician

Edward Owner (1576–1650) was an English politician who sat in the House of Commons at various times between 1621 and 1648. He supported the Parliamentary cause in the English Civil War.

In 1621, Owner was elected Member of Parliament for Great Yarmouth. He was alderman and bailiff of Yarmouth in 1625, and closely connected to its Presbyterian faction, his daughter marrying the minister John Brinsley and was also re-elected MP for the town in the same year. He was bailiff again in 1634 when he was the cause of offence. The bailiffs of the Cinque Ports were accustomed to attend the fair at Yarmouth but in this year Owner refused them their usual seat. They petitioned the Earl of Arundel who settled the matter but recommended "a more courteous carriage, and friendly demeanor, in future."

In April 1640, he was re-elected MP for Yarmouth in the Short Parliament and was re-elected for the Long Parliament in November 1640. He opposed Ship Money in parliament and voted it illegal. When the Civil War broke out, he worked to ensure that the town's defences were satisfactory and contributed financially to this purpose. In January 1646 he led a group of councillors and one of the town's ministers, Thomas Whitfield, in attempt to put down the town's independent congregation. In 1646 he was elected Bailiff of Yarmouth, which he attempted to refuse. He is not recorded as sitting in parliament after Pride's Purge. He made charitable donations to the town of Yarmouth and left property in Ireland to the benefit of the council for the Children's Hospital School .

Owner died in 1650, and was buried in the north aisle of Yarmouth's St Nicholas' Church.

Parliament of England
Preceded by Theophilus Finch; George Hardware	Member of Parliament for Great Yarmouth; 1621–1622; With: Benjamin Cooper	Succeeded by George Hardware; Benjamin Cooper
Preceded by George Hardware; Benjamin Cooper	Member of Parliament for Great Yarmouth; 1625; With: Sir John Corbet, 1st Baronet	Succeeded by Sir John Corbet, 1st Baronet; Thomas Johnson
Vacant Parliament suspended since 1629	Member of Parliament for Great Yarmouth; 1640–1648; With: Miles Corbet	Succeeded by Miles Corbet
