= Chief Butler of England =

Office associated with the feudal Manor in Norfolk

The Chief Butler of England is an office of Grand Sergeanty associated with the feudal Manor of Kenninghall in Norfolk. The office requires service to be provided to the Monarch at the Coronation, in this case the service of Pincera Regis, or Chief Butler at the Coronation banquet.

The manor of Kenninghall was given by Henry I to William de Albini, and was later inherited by the Dukes of Norfolk. It was sold in 1872 to John Oddin Taylor of Norwich.

The last occasion on which a coronation banquet was considered was in 1902 for Edward VII, but plans were abandoned as a result of his illness. Three people claimed the right to act as Chief Butler at the Court of Claims that preceded the coronation – the Duke of Norfolk, Frederic Oddin Taylor of Kenninghall and Lord Mowbray, a descendant of William de Albini, but the claims were not considered and no decision was taken.

== List of Chief Butlers ==
Note that the right to act as Chief Butler has not been established by the Court of Claims since before 1902

- Roger d'Ivry (c.1068–1079)
- Roger Perceval (1079–1087)
- (...)
- William de Albini
- William d'Aubigny, 1st Earl of Arundel (1120–1176)
- William d'Aubigny, 2nd Earl of Arundel (1176–1193)
- William d'Aubigny, 3rd Earl of Arundel (1193–1221)
- William d'Aubigny, 4th Earl of Arundel (1221–1224)
- Hugh d'Aubigny, 5th Earl of Arundel (1224–1243)
- (...)
- John FitzAlan, Lord of Arundel (1264–1267)
- (...)
- Edmund Fitzalan, 9th Earl of Arundel (1285–1326)
- Richard Fitzalan, 10th Earl of Arundel (?1326–?1376)
- Richard Fitzalan, 11th Earl of Arundel (?1376–?1397) (died 1397)
- Gregory Ballard (1396–1399)
- John Payn (1399–1402) Deputy: Hugh Fenn
- (...) (1402–1404)
- Thomas Chaucer (1404–1407) Deputy: Hugh Fenn
- John Tiptoft, 1st Baron Tiptoft (1407)
- Thomas Chaucer (1407–1415) Deputy: Hugh Fenn
- Nicholas Merbury (1415–1421)
- Thomas Chaucer (1421–1434)
- John Tiptoft, 1st Baron Tiptoft (1434– )
- Sir Ralph Boteler, 1st Baron Sudeley (1435–1458)
- John Talbot, 2nd Earl of Shrewsbury (1458–1460)
- Sir John Wenlock, 1st Baron Wenlock (1461–1471)
- John Stafford, 1st Earl of Wiltshire (1471–1473)
- Anthony Woodville, 2nd Earl Rivers (1473–1483)
- Francis Lovell, 1st Viscount Lovell (1483–1485)
- William Fitzalan, 9th Earl of Arundel (1485, at Henry VII's coronation)
- Sir John Fortescue the younger (1485–1500)
- (...)
- Sir Robert Southwell (1505–1513)
- (...)
- Sir John Hussey, 1st Baron Hussey of Sleaford (1521–1537)
- (...)
- Sir William St Loe (under Elizabeth I)
- (...)
- Sir Nicholas Throckmorton (1564–1571)
- (...)
- George FitzRoy, 1st Duke of Northumberland (1713–1716)
- Charles FitzRoy, 2nd Duke of Cleveland (1716–1730)
- William FitzRoy, 3rd Duke of Cleveland (1730–1774)
- (...)
- Henry Howard, 13th Duke of Norfolk (?–1856)
- Henry Fitzalan-Howard, 14th Duke of Norfolk (1856–1860)
- Henry Fitzalan-Howard, 15th Duke of Norfolk (Disputed, 1860–1917)
- Bernard Fitzalan-Howard, 16th Duke of Norfolk (Disputed, 1917–1975)
- Miles Fitzalan-Howard, 17th Duke of Norfolk (Disputed, 1975–2002)
- Edward Fitzalan-Howard, 18th Duke of Norfolk (Disputed, 2002–present)

$ Cited in Patent Rolls from 1396 to 1399.

Taylors of Kenninghall disputed lines:

- John Oddin Taylor (Disputed, 1871–?)
- Frederic Oddin Taylor (Disputed, ?)
- Athelstan Odin-Taylor (Disputed, ?–1975)
- Russell Moore (Disputed, 1975–1983)
- Patrick Palgrave-Moore (Disputed, 1983–1986)
- Ingalill de Joussineau, Countess of Tourdonet (Disputed, 1986–present)
