= Roger Drury (died 1599) =

English politician

Roger Drury (died 1599) of Rollesby and Great Yarmouth, Norfolk, was an English politician.

He was a member (MP) of the parliament of England for Great Yarmouth in 1589.

Parliament of England
Preceded by William Grice; Thomas Damet	Member of Parliament for Great Yarmouth; 1588-1593; With: John Stubbs	Succeeded by Thomas Damet; John Felton
