= 1941 Great Yarmouth by-election =

UK Parliamentary by-election

The 1941 Great Yarmouth by-election was held on 8 April 1941. The by-election was held due to the death of the incumbent Liberal National MP, Arthur Harbord. It was won by the unopposed Liberal National candidate Percy Jewson.
