= Hugh Gray (politician) =

British politician and lecturer

Hugh Gray (19 April 1916 – 1 April 2002) was a British Labour Party politician and lecturer at the University of London.

In 1966 he defeated the Conservative incumbent Anthony Fell to become the Member of Parliament (MP) for Yarmouth until 1970, when Fell regained the seat from him. He unsuccessfully fought Cheltenham in February 1974 and South Norfolk in October 1974 but never re-entered Parliament.

Gray died on 1 April 2002, aged 85.

== Sources ==
- Times Guide to the House of Commons February 1974

Parliament of the United Kingdom
Preceded by Anthony Fell	Member of Parliament for Yarmouth; 1966 – 1970	Succeeded by Anthony Fell
