= Great Yarmouth (constituency) =

Parliamentary constituency in the United Kingdom, 1801–1868 & 1885 onwards

- County constituency for the House of Commons
- Interactive map of boundaries since 1983
- Location within the East of England
- County: Norfolk
- Electorate: 70,077 (March 2020)
- Major settlements: Great Yarmouth, Caister-on-Sea, Gorleston-on-Sea

Current constituency
- Created: 1950
- Member of Parliament: Rupert Lowe (Restore)
- Seats: One

1885–1950
- Seats: One
- Type of constituency: Borough constituency
- Created from: East Suffolk; North Norfolk

1295–1868
- Seats: Two
- Type of constituency: Borough constituency
- Replaced by: East Suffolk; North Norfolk

Great Yarmouth is a constituency in Norfolk represented in the House of Commons of the UK Parliament since 2024 by Rupert Lowe. Elected for Reform UK, Lowe had the whip suspended in March 2025 following allegations of bullying and threats of physical violence against Reform UK party chairman Zia Yusuf. He currently sits as the sole MP for Restore Britain.

The constituency covers the area in and around Great Yarmouth in Norfolk. Despite its rural area, there is a substantial amount of industry in the constituency.

== Constituency profile ==
Great Yarmouth is a coastal constituency located in Norfolk and is coterminous with the local government borough of the same name. The constituency lies on land bounded between the North Sea and the wetlands of the Broads National Park. It covers the connected towns of Great Yarmouth and Gorleston-on-Sea and the villages of Caister-on-Sea, Belton, Hemsby and Martham. Great Yarmouth and Gorleston-on-Sea are seaside resort towns which have also been centres for the fishing and natural gas industries. The area is popular with tourists and contains several holiday caravan parks. The two towns have high levels of deprivation, with many parts falling within the 10% most-deprived areas in England. The surrounding villages are comparatively wealthier. House prices in the constituency are lower than the national average and considerably lower than the rest of the East of England.

In general, residents are older and have very low levels of education, income and professional employment compared to the rest of the country. White people made up 95% of the population at the 2021 census. At the local council level, the central parts of Great Yarmouth and Gorleston-on-Sea are represented by the Labour Party whilst the suburbs and villages mostly elected Conservatives. Voters in the constituency overwhelmingly supported leaving the European Union; an estimated 72% voted in favour of Brexit, making it one of the top 10 most Brexit-supporting constituencies out of 650 nationwide.

From 1979 to 2019 the constituency was a bellwether in general elections as it always voted in an MP for the party forming the Government.

== History ==
The Parliamentary Borough of Great Yarmouth had been represented by two members of parliament (MPs) in the House of Commons of England from 1295 to 1707, in the House of Commons of Great Britain from 1707 to 1800, and in the House of Commons of the United Kingdom from 1801. The borough was unaffected by the Great Reform Act 1832, but it was disenfranchised for corruption by the Reform Act 1867, when its voters were absorbed into the North Division of the Parliamentary County of Norfolk.

The seat was re-established as a single-member Borough by the Redistribution of Seats Act 1885 and remained unchanged until the Representation of the People Act 1948, which came into effect for the 1950 general election. This abolished the Parliamentary Borough and replaced it with the County Constituency of Yarmouth, which incorporated the County Borough and surrounding rural areas.

Further to the local government reorganisation of 1974, which was reflected in the redistribution of seats which came into effect for the 1983 general election, the constituency was formally renamed Great Yarmouth and its boundaries coincided with those of the local authority of the Borough of Great Yarmouth. It has remained unchanged since then.

== Boundaries and boundary changes ==
=== Historic ===
==== 1885–1918 ====
- The Municipal Borough of Great Yarmouth, including the parish of Gorleston, and part of the parish of Runham.

==== 1918–1950 ====
- The County Borough of Great Yarmouth.

==== 1950–1974 ====
- The County Borough of Great Yarmouth; and
- The Rural District of Blofield and Flegg except the civil parishes of Great and Little Plumstead, Postwick, and Thorpe-next-Norwich (later renamed Thorpe St Andrew).

The parts of the Rural District of Blofield and Flegg had previously been included in the abolished Eastern Division of Norfolk.

==== 1974–1983 ====
- The County Borough of Great Yarmouth; and
- the Rural District of Blofield and Flegg.

The remaining parishes of the Rural District of Blofield and Flegg were transferred from the abolished constituency of Central Norfolk.

=== Current (from 1983) ===
- The Borough of Great Yarmouth.

Thorpe St Andrew was transferred to Norwich North and remaining western parts to the new constituency of Mid Norfolk. Gained a small area from the abolished Suffolk constituency of Lowestoft, including Bradwell, which had been transferred to Norfolk as a result of the local government reorganisation of 1974, as laid out in the Local Government Act 1972.

The boundaries were unchanged by the 2023 review of Westminster constituencies.

== Members of Parliament ==
=== Great Yarmouth borough ===
Great Yarmouth was a 2-seat constituency until 1868 when it was disenfranchised. It was recreated for the 1885 general election as a single-seat constituency.

==== MPs 1295–1640 ====
| Year | First member | Second member |
|---|---|---|
| 1309 | Nicholas Fastolf | |
| 1314 | Nicholas Fastolf | |
| 1321 | John Perbroun | |
| 1324 | John Perbroun | |
| 1361 | Hugh Fastolf | |
| 1366 | Hugh Fastolf | |
| 1373 | Hugh Fastolf | |
| 1377 (January) | Hugh Fastolf | |
| 1377 (October) | Hugh Fastolf | |
| 1385 | Ralph Ramsey | |
| 1386 | Ralph Ramsey | John Beketon |
| 1388 (February) | Ralph Ramsey | John Ellis |
| 1388 (September) | Ralph Ramsey | John Hacon |
| 1390 (January) | Ralph Ramsey | John Ellis |
| 1390 (November) | | |
| 1391 | Ralph Ramsey | John Hacon |
| 1393 | John Hacon | John Ellis |
| 1394 | | |
| 1395 | Ralph Ramsey | Hugh Fenn |
| 1397 (January) | Richard Cley | Hugh Fenn |
| 1397 (September) | Ralph Ramsey | William Oxney |
| 1399 | John Beketon | Hugh Fenn |
| 1401 | | |
| 1402 | | |
| 1404 (January) | Roger Adams | Geoffrey Pamping |
| 1404 (October) | | |
| 1406 | Robert Ellis | Henry Rafman |
| 1407 | Robert Clere | Peter atte Fenn |
| 1410 | William Parker | Alexander atte Gapp |
| 1411 | Nicholas Cates | Peter Atte Fenn |
| 1413 (February) | | |
| 1413 (May) | William Oxney | Alexander atte Gapp |
| 1414 (April) | | |
| 1414 (November) | Geoffrey Pamping | Robert Ellis |
| 1415 | | |
| 1416 (March) | | |
| 1416 (October) | | |
| 1417 | Henry S[pitling] | Richard [?Ellis] |
| 1419 | William Colkirk | John Cranley |
| 1420 | Thomas Dengaine | Robert Ellis |
| 1421 (May) | Thomas Covehithe | Robert Ellis |
| 1421 (December) | Richard Ellis | Robert Cupper |
| 1455 | Richard Southwell | |
| 1478 | John Paston | |
| 1491 | Robert Crowmer | |
| 1504 | Thomas More | |
| 1510–1523 | No names known | |
| 1529 | Humphrey Wingfield | John Ladde, died and replaced 1353 or 1354 by Philip Bernard |
| 1536 | ? | ? |
| 1539 | ? | ? |
| 1542 | Sir Humphrey Wingfield | William Burgh |
| 1545 | Sir William Woodhouse | Robert Eyre |
| 1547 | Sir William Woodhouse | Robert Eyre |
| 1553 (March) | Sir William Woodhouse | Nicholas Firmage |
| 1553 (October) | Robert Eyre | Simon More |
| 1554 (April) | William Bishop | John Echard |
| 1554 (November) | Thomas Hunt | William Mayhew |
| 1555 | Nicholas Fen | Cornelius Bright |
| 1558 | Sir Thomas Woodhouse | William Barker |
| 1558–59 | Sir Thomas Woodhouse | William Barker |
| 1562 | William Grice | Thomas Timperley |
| 1571 | William Barker | William Grice |
| 1572 | William Grice | John Bacon, died and replaced Feb 1576 by Edward Bacon |
| 1584 | William Grice | Thomas Damet |
| 1586 | William Grice | Thomas Damet |
| 1588 | John Stubbe or Stubbs | Roger Drury |
| 1593 | Thomas Damet | John Felton |
| 1597 | Henry Hobart | John Felton |
| 1601 | Henry Hobart | Thomas Damet |
| 1604–1611 | Thomas Damet | John Wheeler |
| 1614 | Theophilus Finch | George Hardware |
| 1621–1622 | Benjamin Cooper | Edward Owner |
| 1624 | Benjamin Cooper | George Hardware |
| 1625 | Sir John Corbet | Edward Owner |
| 1626 | Sir John Corbet | Thomas Johnson |
| 1628 | Sir John Corbet | Sir John Wentworth |
| 1629–1640 | No Parliaments convened | |

==== MPs 1640–1868 ====
| Election | First member | First party | Second member | Second party |
|---|---|---|---|---|
| April 1640 | Miles Corbet | Parliamentarian | Edward Owner | Parliamentarian |
| November 1640 | Miles Corbet | Parliamentarian | Edward Owner | Parliamentarian |
| December 1648 | Miles Corbet | Parliamentarian | Owner not recorded as sitting after Pride's Purge | |
| 1653 | Great Yarmouth was unrepresented in the Barebones Parliament | | | |
| 1654 | Colonel William Goffe | | Thomas Dunn | |
| 1656 | Charles George Cook | | William Burton | |
| January 1659 | Charles George Cook | | William Burton | |
| May 1659 | Great Yarmouth was unrepresented in the restored Rump | | | |
| April 1660 | Sir John Potts | | Sir William D'Oyly | |
| 1661 | Sir William Coventry | | Sir William D'Oyly | |
| 1678 | Sir William Coventry | | Sir Thomas Medowe | |
| February 1679 | Sir William Coventry | | Richard Huntington | |
| August 1679 | George England | | Richard Huntington | |
| 1681 | George England | | Sir James Johnson | |
| 1685 | Sir William Cook | | John Friend | Tory |
| 1689 | George England | | Samuel Fuller | |
| 1698 | George England | | John Nicholson | |
| January 1701 | George England | | Samuel Fuller | |
| November 1701 | John Burton | | John Nicholson | |
| 1702 | Benjamin England | | John Nicholson | |
| 1708 | Roger Townshend | | Richard Ferrier | Tory |
| 1709 | Nathaniel Symonds | | Richard Ferrier | Tory |
| 1710 | George England | | Richard Ferrier | Tory |
| 1715 | George England | | Horatio Townshend | |
| 1722 | Hon. Charles Townshend | | Horatio Walpole | |
| 1723 | William Townshend | | Horatio Walpole | |
| 1734 | William Townshend | | (Sir) Edward Walpole | |
| 1738 | Roger Townshend | Patriot Whig | (Sir) Edward Walpole | |
| 1747 | Hon. Charles Townshend | | (Sir) Edward Walpole | |
| 1756 | Charles Townshend | | (Sir) Edward Walpole | |
| 1768 | Charles Townshend | | Hon. Richard Walpole | |
| 1784 | Captain Sir John Jervis | | Henry Beaufoy | |
| 1790 | Charles Townshend | | Henry Beaufoy | |
| 1795 | Charles Townshend | | Brigadier Stephens Howe | Tory |
| May 1796 | Lord Charles Townshend killed by brother, 1796 | Tory | Brigadier Stephens Howe | Tory |
| October 1796 | Major-General William Loftus | Tory | Henry Jodrell | Tory |
| 1802 | Captain Sir Thomas Troubridge | | Thomas Jervis | |
| 1806 | Hon. Edward Harbord | Tory | Dr Stephen Lushington | Tory |
| 1808 | Hon. Edward Harbord | Tory | Giffin Wilson | Whig |
| 1812 | William Loftus | Tory | Edmund Lacon | Tory |
| 1818 | Thomas Anson | Whig | Charles Rumbold | Whig |
| 1819 | Hon. George Anson | Whig | Charles Rumbold | Whig |
| 1835 | Thomas Baring | Conservative | W. Mackworth Praed | Conservative |
| 1837 | Charles Rumbold | Whig | William Wilshere | Whig |
| 1847 | Lord Arthur Lennox | Conservative | Octavius Coope | Conservative |
| 1848 | Joseph Sandars | Conservative | Charles Rumbold | Whig |
| 1852 | Sir Edmund Lacon | Conservative | Charles Rumbold | Whig |
| March 1857 | William McCullagh | Independent Whig | Edward Watkin | Radical |
| August 1857 | Adolphus William Young | Whig | John Mellor | Whig |
| 1859 | Sir Edmund Lacon, Bt | Conservative | Sir Henry Stracey, Bt | Conservative |
| 1865 | Sir Edmund Lacon, Bt | Conservative | James Goodson | Conservative |
| 1868 | Constituency disfranchised for corruption | | | |

==== MPs 1885–1950 ====
- 1885: Constituency revived, electing only a single member

| Election | Member | Party |
|---|---|---|
| 1885 | Sir Henry Tyler | Conservative |
| 1892 | James Marshall Moorsom | Liberal |
| 1895 | Sir John Colomb | Conservative |
| 1906 | (Sir) Arthur Fell | Conservative |
| 1922 | Arthur Harbord | Liberal |
| 1924 | Sir Frank Meyer | Conservative |
| 1929 | Sir Arthur Harbord | Liberal |
| 1931 | Sir Arthur Harbord | Liberal National |
| 1941 by-election | Percy Jewson | Liberal National |
| 1945 | Ernest Kinghorn | Labour |
| 1950 | Great Yarmouth borough abolished: new county constituency named Yarmouth | |

=== Yarmouth County Constituency ===
==== MPs 1950–1974 ====
| Election | Member | Party |
|---|---|---|
| 1950 | Ernest Kinghorn | Labour |
| 1951 | Anthony Fell | Conservative |
| 1966 | Hugh Gray | Labour |
| 1970 | Anthony Fell | Conservative |
| 1983 | Constituency renamed Great Yarmouth | |

=== Great Yarmouth County Constituency ===
==== MPs since 1983 ====
| Election | Member | Party |
|---|---|---|
| 1983 | Michael Carttiss | Conservative |
| 1997 | Tony Wright | Labour |
| 2010 | Sir Brandon Lewis | Conservative |
| 2024 | Rupert Lowe | Reform UK |
| 2025 | Rupert Lowe | Independent |
| 2026 | Rupert Lowe | Restore |

== Elections ==
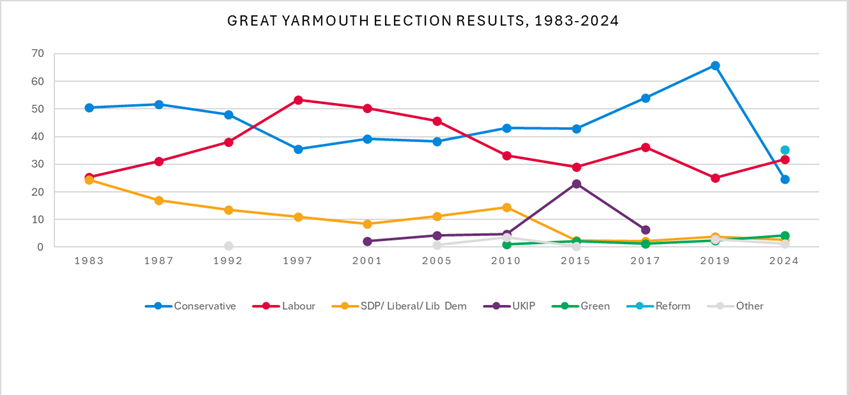
Great Yarmouth election results 1983-2024

=== Elections in the 2020s ===
General election 2024: Great Yarmouth
| Party | Candidate | Votes | % | ±% |
|---|---|---|---|---|
| Reform | Rupert Lowe | 14,385 | 35.3 | N/A |
| Labour | Keir Cozens | 12,959 | 31.8 | +6.7 |
| Conservative | James Clark | 10,034 | 24.6 | −41.2 |
| Green | Trevor Rawson | 1,736 | 4.3 | +1.9 |
| Liberal Democrats | Fionna Tod | 1,102 | 2.7 | −1.1 |
| Independent | Paul Brown | 230 | 0.6 | N/A |
| English Democrat | Catherine Blaiklock | 171 | 0.4 | N/A |
| Independent | Clare Roullier | 131 | 0.3 | N/A |
| Majority | | 1,426 | 3.5 | N/A |
| Turnout | | 40,748 | 55.6 | −4.8 |
| Registered electors | | 73,317 | | |
| Reform gain from Conservative | | | | |

=== Elections in the 2010s ===
General election 2019: Great Yarmouth
| Party | Candidate | Votes | % | ±% |
|---|---|---|---|---|
| Conservative | Brandon Lewis | 28,593 | 65.8 | +11.7 |
| Labour Co-op | Mike Smith-Clare | 10,930 | 25.1 | −11.0 |
| Liberal Democrats | James Joyce | 1,661 | 3.8 | +1.6 |
| Green | Anne Killett | 1,064 | 2.4 | +1.1 |
| VPP | Dave Harding | 631 | 1.5 | N/A |
| Independent | Adrian Myers | 429 | 1.0 | N/A |
| Independent | Margaret McMahon-Morris | 154 | 0.4 | N/A |
| Majority | | 17,663 | 40.7 | +22.7 |
| Turnout | | 43,462 | 60.4 | −1.4 |
| Conservative hold | | Swing | +11.3 | |

General election 2017: Great Yarmouth
| Party | Candidate | Votes | % | ±% |
|---|---|---|---|---|
| Conservative | Brandon Lewis | 23,901 | 54.1 | +11.2 |
| Labour | Mike Smith-Clare | 15,928 | 36.1 | +7.0 |
| UKIP | Catherine Blaiklock | 2,767 | 6.3 | −16.8 |
| Liberal Democrats | James Joyce | 987 | 2.2 | −0.1 |
| Green | Harry Webb | 563 | 1.3 | −0.9 |
| Majority | | 7,973 | 18.0 | +4.2 |
| Turnout | | 44,146 | 61.8 | −1.9 |
| Conservative hold | | Swing | +1.6 | |

General election 2015: Great Yarmouth
| Party | Candidate | Votes | % | ±% |
|---|---|---|---|---|
| Conservative | Brandon Lewis | 19,089 | 42.9 | −0.2 |
| Labour | Lara Norris | 12,935 | 29.1 | −4.1 |
| UKIP | Alan Grey | 10,270 | 23.1 | +18.3 |
| Liberal Democrats | James Joyce | 1,030 | 2.3 | −12.1 |
| Green | Harry Webb | 978 | 2.2 | +1.2 |
| CISTA | Samuel Townley | 167 | 0.4 | N/A |
| Majority | | 6,154 | 13.8 | +3.9 |
| Turnout | | 44,469 | 63.7 | +2.5 |
| Conservative hold | | Swing | +1.95 | |

General election 2010: Great Yarmouth
| Party | Candidate | Votes | % | ±% |
|---|---|---|---|---|
| Conservative | Brandon Lewis | 18,571 | 43.1 | +4.9 |
| Labour | Tony Wright | 14,295 | 33.2 | −12.4 |
| Liberal Democrats | Simon Partridge | 6,188 | 14.4 | +3.3 |
| UKIP | Alan Baugh | 2,066 | 4.8 | +0.5 |
| BNP | Bosco Tann | 1,421 | 3.3 | N/A |
| Green | Laura Biggart | 416 | 1.0 | N/A |
| Independent | Margaret McMahon-Morris | 100 | 0.2 | N/A |
| Majority | | 4,276 | 9.9 | N/A |
| Turnout | | 43,057 | 61.2 | +1.1 |
| Conservative gain from Labour | | Swing | +8.7 | |

=== Elections in the 2000s ===
General election 2005: Great Yarmouth
| Party | Candidate | Votes | % | ±% |
|---|---|---|---|---|
| Labour | Tony Wright | 18,850 | 45.6 | −4.8 |
| Conservative | Mark Fox | 15,795 | 38.2 | −0.9 |
| Liberal Democrats | Stephen Newton | 4,585 | 11.1 | +2.7 |
| UKIP | Bertie Poole | 1,759 | 4.3 | +2.2 |
| Legalise Cannabis | Michael Skipper | 389 | 0.9 | N/A |
| Majority | | 3,055 | 7.4 | −3.9 |
| Turnout | | 41,378 | 60.1 | +1.8 |
| Labour hold | | Swing | −2.0 | |

General election 2001: Great Yarmouth
| Party | Candidate | Votes | % | ±% |
|---|---|---|---|---|
| Labour | Tony Wright | 20,344 | 50.4 | −3.0 |
| Conservative | Charles Reynolds | 15,780 | 39.1 | +3.5 |
| Liberal Democrats | Maurice Leeke | 3,392 | 8.4 | −2.6 |
| UKIP | Bertie Poole | 850 | 2.1 | N/A |
| Majority | | 4,564 | 11.3 | −6.5 |
| Turnout | | 40,366 | 58.3 | −12.9 |
| Labour hold | | Swing | -3.3 | |

=== Elections in the 1990s ===
General election 1997: Great Yarmouth
| Party | Candidate | Votes | % | ±% |
|---|---|---|---|---|
| Labour | Tony Wright | 26,084 | 53.4 | +15.4 |
| Conservative | Michael Carttiss | 17,416 | 35.6 | −12.3 |
| Liberal Democrats | Derek Wood | 5,381 | 11.0 | −2.6 |
| Majority | | 8,668 | 17.8 | N/A |
| Turnout | | 48,881 | 71.33 | −6.7 |
| Labour gain from Conservative | | Swing | +13.9 | |

General election 1992: Great Yarmouth
| Party | Candidate | Votes | % | ±% |
|---|---|---|---|---|
| Conservative | Michael Carttiss | 25,505 | 47.9 | −3.8 |
| Labour | Barbara Baughan | 20,196 | 38.0 | +6.9 |
| Liberal Democrats | Malcolm Scott | 7,225 | 13.6 | −3.5 |
| Natural Law | P Larkin | 284 | 0.5 | N/A |
| Majority | | 5,309 | 9.9 | −10.7 |
| Turnout | | 53,210 | 77.9 | +3.4 |
| Conservative hold | | Swing | −5.3 | |

=== Elections in the 1980s ===
General election 1987: Great Yarmouth
| Party | Candidate | Votes | % | ±% |
|---|---|---|---|---|
| Conservative | Michael Carttiss | 25,336 | 51.7 | +1.2 |
| Labour | John Cannell | 15,253 | 31.1 | +5.8 |
| SDP | Stuart Maxwell | 8,387 | 17.1 | −7.2 |
| Majority | | 10,083 | 20.6 | −4.6 |
| Turnout | | 48,976 | 74.5 | +3.7 |
| Conservative hold | | Swing | −2.3 | |

General election 1983: Great Yarmouth
| Party | Candidate | Votes | % | ±% |
|---|---|---|---|---|
| Conservative | Michael Carttiss | 22,423 | 50.5 | |
| Labour | Owen Lloyd | 11,223 | 25.3 | |
| Liberal | Eric Minett | 10,803 | 24.3 | |
| Majority | | 11,200 | 25.2 | |
| Turnout | | 44,449 | 70.8 | |
| Conservative hold | | Swing | | |

=== Elections in the 1970s ===
General election 1979: Great Yarmouth
| Party | Candidate | Votes | % | ±% |
|---|---|---|---|---|
| Conservative | Anthony Fell | 28,066 | 50.4 | +7.1 |
| Labour | Patricia Hollis | 20,838 | 37.4 | −1.6 |
| Liberal | Eric Minett | 6,112 | 11.0 | −6.7 |
| National Front | T Holmes | 640 | 1.1 | N/A |
| Majority | | 7,228 | 13.0 | +8.7 |
| Turnout | | 55,656 | 77.1 | +3.5 |
| Conservative hold | | Swing | +4.3 | |

General election October 1974: Great Yarmouth
| Party | Candidate | Votes | % | ±% |
|---|---|---|---|---|
| Conservative | Anthony Fell | 22,573 | 43.3 | −0.1 |
| Labour | Patricia Hollis | 20,313 | 39.0 | +4.3 |
| Liberal | PR Coleby | 9,250 | 17.7 | −4.3 |
| Majority | | 2,260 | 4.33 | −4.4 |
| Turnout | | 52,136 | 73.6 | −7.6 |
| Conservative hold | | Swing | | |

General election February 1974: Great Yarmouth
| Party | Candidate | Votes | % | ±% |
|---|---|---|---|---|
| Conservative | Anthony Fell | 24,711 | 43.4 | −6.2 |
| Labour | Patricia Hollis | 19,774 | 34.7 | −8.1 |
| Liberal | PR Coleby | 12,524 | 22.0 | +14.4 |
| Majority | | 4,397 | 8.7 | +1.9 |
| Turnout | | 57,009 | 81.2 | +3.9 |
| Conservative hold | | Swing | | |

General election 1970: Yarmouth
| Party | Candidate | Votes | % | ±% |
|---|---|---|---|---|
| Conservative | Anthony Fell | 23,088 | 49.6 | +0.5 |
| Labour | Hugh Gray | 19,931 | 42.8 | −8.1 |
| Liberal | Joan Knott | 3,523 | 7.6 | N/A |
| Majority | | 3,157 | 6.8 | N/A |
| Turnout | | 46,542 | 77.3 | −2.5 |
| Conservative gain from Labour | | Swing | +4.3 | |

=== Elections in the 1960s ===
General election 1966: Yarmouth
| Party | Candidate | Votes | % | ±% |
|---|---|---|---|---|
| Labour | Hugh Gray | 22,296 | 50.9 | +8.5 |
| Conservative | Anthony Fell | 21,499 | 49.1 | +2.3 |
| Majority | | 797 | 1.8 | N/A |
| Turnout | | 43,795 | 79.8 | −0.5 |
| Labour gain from Conservative | | Swing | +3.1 | |

General election 1964: Yarmouth
| Party | Candidate | Votes | % | ±% |
|---|---|---|---|---|
| Conservative | Anthony Fell | 20,310 | 46.8 | −7.5 |
| Labour | Stanley Clinton-Davis | 18,381 | 42.4 | −3.3 |
| Liberal | David Spreckley | 4,680 | 10.8 | N/A |
| Majority | | 1,929 | 4.4 | −4.2 |
| Turnout | | 43,371 | 80.3 | +0.7 |
| Conservative hold | | Swing | −2.0 | |

=== Election in the 1950s ===
General election 1959: Yarmouth
| Party | Candidate | Votes | % | ±% |
|---|---|---|---|---|
| Conservative | Anthony Fell | 22,827 | 54.3 | +3.2 |
| Labour | Stanley Clinton-Davis | 19,248 | 45.7 | −3.2 |
| Majority | | 3,579 | 8.6 | +6.4 |
| Turnout | | 42,075 | 79.6 | −0.1 |
| Conservative hold | | Swing | | |

General election 1955: Yarmouth
| Party | Candidate | Votes | % | ±% |
|---|---|---|---|---|
| Conservative | Anthony Fell | 21,317 | 51.1 | −0.1 |
| Labour | Ernest Kinghorn | 20,400 | 48.9 | +0.1 |
| Majority | | 917 | 2.2 | −0.2 |
| Turnout | | 41,757 | 79.7 | −3.6 |
| Conservative hold | | Swing | | |

General election 1951: Yarmouth
| Party | Candidate | Votes | % | ±% |
|---|---|---|---|---|
| Conservative | Anthony Fell | 22,180 | 51.2 | +9.4 |
| Labour | Ernest Kinghorn | 21,165 | 48.8 | +3.3 |
| Majority | | 1,015 | 2.4 | N/A |
| Turnout | | 43,345 | 83.3 | −0.8 |
| Conservative gain from Labour | | Swing | | |

General election 1950: Yarmouth
| Party | Candidate | Votes | % | ±% |
|---|---|---|---|---|
| Labour | Ernest Kinghorn | 19,131 | 44.5 | −11.3 |
| Conservative | Edward Baker | 17,969 | 41.8 | −2.4 |
| Liberal | Ronald Thomas Archibald Cornwell | 5,854 | 13.6 | N/A |
| Majority | | 1,162 | 2.7 | −8.9 |
| Turnout | | 42,954 | 84.1 | +14.3 |
| Labour hold | | Swing | | |

=== Elections in the 1940s ===
General election 1945: Great Yarmouth
| Party | Candidate | Votes | % | ±% |
|---|---|---|---|---|
| Labour | Ernest Kinghorn | 10,079 | 55.8 | +15.1 |
| National Liberal | Percy Jewson | 7,974 | 44.2 | −15.1 |
| Majority | | 2,105 | 11.6 | N/A |
| Turnout | | 18,053 | 69.8 | −6.6 |
| Labour gain from National Liberal | | Swing | | |

1941 Great Yarmouth by-election
| Party | Candidate | Votes | % | ±% |
|---|---|---|---|---|
| National Liberal | Percy Jewson | Unopposed | N/A | N/A |
| National Liberal hold | | Swing | | |

=== Elections in the 1930s ===
General election 1935: Great Yarmouth
| Party | Candidate | Votes | % | ±% |
|---|---|---|---|---|
| National Liberal | Arthur Harbord | 16,998 | 59.3 | −19.3 |
| Labour | John Lewis | 11,658 | 40.7 | +19.3 |
| Majority | | 5,340 | 18.6 | −38.6 |
| Turnout | | 28,656 | 76.4 | +4.3 |
| National Liberal hold | | Swing | | |

General election 1931: Great Yarmouth
| Party | Candidate | Votes | % | ±% |
|---|---|---|---|---|
| National Liberal | Arthur Harbord | 21,008 | 78.6 | +40.1 |
| Labour | John Hanbury Martin | 5,735 | 21.4 | +3.6 |
| Majority | | 15,273 | 57.2 | N/A |
| Turnout | | 26,743 | 72.1 | −11.0 |
| National Liberal gain from Liberal | | Swing | | |

=== Elections in the 1920s ===
General election 1929: Great Yarmouth
| Party | Candidate | Votes | % | ±% |
|---|---|---|---|---|
| Liberal | Arthur Harbord | 13,147 | 43.7 | +3.2 |
| Unionist | Frank Meyer | 11,570 | 38.5 | −6.6 |
| Labour | George Johnson | 5,347 | 17.8 | +3.4 |
| Majority | | 1,577 | 5.2 | N/A |
| Turnout | | 30,064 | 83.1 | +3.2 |
| Registered electors | | 36,170 | | |
| Liberal gain from Unionist | | Swing | +4.9 | |

General election 1924: Great Yarmouth
| Party | Candidate | Votes | % | ±% |
|---|---|---|---|---|
| Unionist | Frank Meyer | 10,273 | 45.1 | +6.6 |
| Liberal | Arthur Harbord | 9,202 | 40.5 | −11.3 |
| Labour | T G Tyler | 3,264 | 14.4 | +4.7 |
| Majority | | 1,071 | 4.6 | N/A |
| Turnout | | 22,739 | 79.9 | +0.7 |
| Registered electors | | 28,447 | | |
| Unionist gain from Liberal | | Swing | +9.0 | |

General election 1923: Great Yarmouth
| Party | Candidate | Votes | % | ±% |
|---|---|---|---|---|
| Liberal | Arthur Harbord | 11,416 | 51.8 | +5.7 |
| Unionist | James Allan Horne | 8,492 | 38.5 | −3.3 |
| Labour | Albert Wrigley | 2,138 | 9.7 | −2.4 |
| Majority | | 2,924 | 13.3 | +9.0 |
| Turnout | | 22,046 | 79.2 | +0.2 |
| Registered electors | | 27,844 | | |
| Liberal hold | | Swing | +4.5 | |

General election 1922: Great Yarmouth
| Party | Candidate | Votes | % | ±% |
|---|---|---|---|---|
| Liberal | Arthur Harbord | 9,836 | 46.1 | +6.4 |
| Unionist | Chichester Crookshank | 8,917 | 41.8 | −4.8 |
| Labour | Arthur Whiting | 2,574 | 12.1 | −0.7 |
| Majority | | 919 | 4.3 | N/A |
| Turnout | | 21,327 | 79.0 | +20.2 |
| Registered electors | | 26,985 | | |
| Liberal gain from Unionist | | Swing | +5.6 | |

=== Elections in the 1910s ===
General election 1918: Great Yarmouth
| Party | | Candidate | Votes | % | ±% |
|---|---|---|---|---|---|
| C | Unionist | Arthur Fell | 6,741 | 46.6 | −5.7 |
| | Liberal | *J. Havelock Wilson | 5,734 | 39.7 | −8.0 |
| | Labour | William McConnell | 1,845 | 12.8 | N/A |
| | Independent | ** William H Dawson | 125 | 0.9 | N/A |
| Majority | | | 1,007 | 6.9 | +2.3 |
| Turnout | | | 14,448 | 58.8 | −25.3 |
| Registered electors | | | 24,585 | | |
| | Unionist hold | | Swing | +1.2 | |
C indicates candidate endorsed by the coalition government.

* Wilson – who stood as a 'Patriotic Trade Unionist's and Seamen's' candidate – supported the Coalition Government and was supported by the National Sailors' and Firemen's Union. He claimed to have been adopted by both the Liberal Party and National Democratic and Labour Party, but only appeared on the former's official list. ** Dawson initially was endorsed by the National Federation of Discharged and Demobilized Sailors and Soldiers who then repudiated him.

== Election results 1885–1918 ==
=== Elections in the 1880s ===
General election 1885: Great Yarmouth
| Party | Candidate | Votes | % | ±% |
|---|---|---|---|---|
| Conservative | Henry Tyler | 2,661 | 51.9 | |
| Liberal | Cecil Norton | 2,466 | 48.1 | |
| Majority | | 195 | 3.8 | |
| Turnout | | 5,127 | 73.8 | |
| Registered electors | | 6,949 | | |
| Conservative win (new seat) | | | | |

Norton

General election 1886: Great Yarmouth
| Party | Candidate | Votes | % | ±% |
|---|---|---|---|---|
| Conservative | Henry Tyler | 2,977 | 59.7 | +7.8 |
| Liberal | Cecil Norton | 2,011 | 40.3 | −7.8 |
| Majority | | 966 | 19.4 | +15.6 |
| Turnout | | 4,988 | 71.8 | −2.0 |
| Registered electors | | 6,949 | | |
| Conservative hold | | Swing | +7.8 | |

=== Elections in the 1890s ===
General election 1892: Great Yarmouth
| Party | Candidate | Votes | % | ±% |
|---|---|---|---|---|
| Liberal | James Marshall Moorsom | 2,972 | 52.4 | +12.1 |
| Conservative | Henry Tyler | 2,704 | 47.6 | −12.1 |
| Majority | | 268 | 4.8 | N/A |
| Turnout | | 5,676 | 71.4 | −0.4 |
| Registered electors | | 7,947 | | |
| Liberal gain from Conservative | | Swing | +12.1 | |

General election 1895: Great Yarmouth
| Party | Candidate | Votes | % | ±% |
|---|---|---|---|---|
| Conservative | John Colomb | 3,528 | 54.9 | +7.3 |
| Liberal | James Marshall Moorsom | 2,893 | 45.1 | −7.3 |
| Majority | | 635 | 9.8 | N/A |
| Turnout | | 6,421 | 78.9 | +7.5 |
| Registered electors | | 8,139 | | |
| Conservative gain from Liberal | | Swing | +7.3 | |

=== Elections in the 1900s ===
General election 1900: Great Yarmouth
| Party | Candidate | Votes | % | ±% |
|---|---|---|---|---|
| Conservative | John Colomb | Unopposed | | |
| Conservative hold | | | | |

General election 1906: Great Yarmouth
| Party | Candidate | Votes | % | ±% |
|---|---|---|---|---|
| Conservative | Arthur Fell | 4,071 | 51.5 | N/A |
| Liberal | Martin White | 3,835 | 48.5 | New |
| Majority | | 236 | 3.0 | N/A |
| Turnout | | 7,906 | 86.2 | N/A |
| Registered electors | | 9,169 | | |
| Conservative hold | | Swing | N/A | |

=== Elections in the 1910s ===
General election January 1910: Great Yarmouth
| Party | Candidate | Votes | % | ±% |
|---|---|---|---|---|
| Conservative | Arthur Fell | 4,459 | 52.7 | +1.2 |
| Liberal | James Edward Platt | 3,998 | 47.3 | −1.2 |
| Majority | | 461 | 5.4 | +2.4 |
| Turnout | | 8,457 | 88.4 | +2.2 |
| Conservative hold | | Swing | +1.2 | |

General election December 1910: Great Yarmouth
| Party | Candidate | Votes | % | ±% |
|---|---|---|---|---|
| Conservative | Arthur Fell | 4,210 | 52.3 | −0.4 |
| Liberal | James Edward Platt | 3,837 | 47.7 | +0.4 |
| Majority | | 373 | 4.6 | −0.8 |
| Turnout | | 8,047 | 84.1 | −4.3 |
| Conservative hold | | Swing | −0.4 | |

General Election 1914–15:

Another General Election was required to take place before the end of 1915. The political parties had been making preparations for an election to take place and by July 1914, the following candidates had been selected;

- Unionist: Arthur Fell
- Liberal:

== Election results 1832–1868 ==
=== Elections in the 1830s ===
General election 1832: Great Yarmouth (2 seats)
| Party | Candidate | Votes | % | ±% |
|---|---|---|---|---|
| Whig | Charles Rumbold | 837 | 34.7 | +3.6 |
| Whig | George Anson | 828 | 34.3 | +3.1 |
| Tory | Andrew Colvile | 750 | 31.1 | −6.5 |
| Majority | | 78 | 3.2 | −9.0 |
| Turnout | | 1,555 | 92.4 | c. +7.3 |
| Registered electors | | 1,683 | | |
| Whig hold | | Swing | +3.4 | |
| Whig hold | | Swing | +3.2 | |

General election 1835: Great Yarmouth (2 seats)
| Party | Candidate | Votes | % | ±% |
|---|---|---|---|---|
| Conservative | Thomas Baring | 772 | 26.7 | +11.2 |
| Conservative | Winthrop Mackworth Praed | 768 | 26.5 | +11.0 |
| Whig | George Anson | 680 | 23.5 | −10.8 |
| Whig | Charles Rumbold | 675 | 23.3 | −11.4 |
| Majority | | 88 | 3.0 | N/A |
| Turnout | | 1,447 | 89.6 | −2.8 |
| Registered electors | | 1,615 | | |
| Conservative gain from Whig | | Swing | +11.2 | |
| Conservative gain from Whig | | Swing | +11.1 | |

General election 1837: Great Yarmouth (2 seats)
| Party | Candidate | Votes | % | ±% |
|---|---|---|---|---|
| Whig | Charles Rumbold | 790 | 26.8 | +3.5 |
| Whig | William Wilshere | 779 | 26.4 | +2.9 |
| Conservative | Thomas Baring | 699 | 23.7 | −3.0 |
| Conservative | Charles Gambier | 685 | 23.2 | −3.3 |
| Majority | | 80 | 2.7 | N/A |
| Turnout | | 1,474 | 84.7 | −4.9 |
| Registered electors | | 1,740 | | |
| Whig gain from Conservative | | Swing | +3.3 | |
| Whig gain from Conservative | | Swing | +3.0 | |

Wilshere resigned, causing a by-election.

By-election, 23 August 1838: Great Yarmouth (2 seats)
| Party | Candidate | Votes | % | ±% |
|---|---|---|---|---|
| Whig | William Wilshere | 735 | 51.1 | −2.1 |
| Conservative | Thomas Baring | 702 | 48.9 | +2.0 |
| Majority | | 33 | 2.2 | −0.5 |
| Turnout | | 1,437 | 83.6 | −1.1 |
| Registered electors | | 1,719 | | |
| Whig hold | | Swing | −2.1 | |

=== Elections in the 1840s ===
General election 1841: Great Yarmouth (2 seats)
| Party | Candidate | Votes | % | ±% |
|---|---|---|---|---|
| Whig | William Wilshere | 945 | 32.8 | +6.4 |
| Whig | Charles Rumbold | 943 | 32.8 | +6.0 |
| Conservative | Thomas Baring | 501 | 17.4 | −6.3 |
| Conservative | Joseph Somes | 494 | 17.1 | −6.1 |
| Majority | | 442 | 15.4 | +12.7 |
| Turnout | | 1,445 | 74.9 | −9.8 |
| Registered electors | | 1,930 | | |
| Whig hold | | Swing | +6.3 | |
| Whig hold | | Swing | +6.1 | |

General election 1847: Great Yarmouth (2 seats)
| Party | Candidate | Votes | % | ±% |
|---|---|---|---|---|
| Conservative | Arthur Lennox | 834 | 27.1 | +9.7 |
| Conservative | Octavius Coope | 813 | 26.4 | +9.3 |
| Whig | Charles Rumbold | 729 | 23.7 | −9.1 |
| Whig | Francis Goldsmid | 698 | 22.7 | −10.1 |
| Majority | | 84 | 2.7 | N/A |
| Turnout | | 1,537 (est) | 81.9 (est) | +7.0 |
| Registered electors | | 1,877 | | |
| Conservative gain from Whig | | Swing | +9.7 | |
| Conservative gain from Whig | | Swing | +9.5 | |

The election of Lennox and Coope was declared void on petition on 14 February 1848 due to bribery, causing a by-election.

By-election, 8 July 1848: Great Yarmouth (2 seats)
| Party | Candidate | Votes | % | ±% |
|---|---|---|---|---|
| Conservative | Joseph Sandars | 416 | 37.8 | −15.7 |
| Whig | Charles Rumbold | 384 | 34.9 | +11.2 |
| Whig | Robert John Bagshaw | 300 | 27.3 | +4.6 |
| Majority | | 32 | 2.9 | +0.2 |
| Turnout | | 550 (est) | 29.3 (est) | −52.6 |
| Registered electors | | 1,877 | | |
| Conservative hold | | Swing | −15.8 | |
| Whig gain from Conservative | | Swing | +9.5 | |

=== Elections in the 1850s ===
General election 1852: Great Yarmouth (2 seats)
| Party | Candidate | Votes | % | ±% |
|---|---|---|---|---|
| Conservative | Edmund Lacon | 611 | 28.2 | −25.3 |
| Whig | Charles Rumbold | 547 | 25.3 | −21.1 |
| Independent Whig | William McCullagh | 521 | 24.1 | N/A |
| Radical | Charles Napier | 486 | 22.4 | N/A |
| Turnout | | 1,083 (est) | 86.7 (est) | +4.8 |
| Registered electors | | 1,249 | | |
| Majority | | 64 | 2.9 | +0.2 |
| Conservative hold | | Swing | −2.1 | |
| Majority | | 26 | 1.2 | N/A |
| Whig gain from Conservative | | Swing | +2.1 | |

General election 1857: Great Yarmouth (2 seats)
| Party | Candidate | Votes | % | ±% |
|---|---|---|---|---|
| Independent Whig | William McCullagh | 609 | 28.1 | +4.0 |
| Radical | Edward Watkin | 590 | 27.2 | +4.8 |
| Conservative | Edmund Lacon | 521 | 24.0 | +9.9 |
| Conservative | Charles Smyth Vereker | 451 | 20.8 | +6.7 |
| Turnout | | 1,086 (est) | 83.0 (est) | −3.7 |
| Registered electors | | 1,308 | | |
| Majority | | 88 | 4.1 | N/A |
| Independent Whig gain from Conservative | | Swing | −2.2 | |
| Majority | | 61 | 2.8 | N/A |
| Radical gain from Whig | | Swing | −1.8 | |

The election was declared void on petition due to bribery by McCullagh and Watkin's agents, causing a by-election.

By-election, 10 August 1857: Great Yarmouth (2 seats)
| Party | Candidate | Votes | % | ±% |
|---|---|---|---|---|
| Whig | Adolphus William Young | Unopposed | | |
| Whig | John Mellor | Unopposed | | |
| Whig gain from Independent Whig | | | | |
| Whig gain from Radical | | | | |

General election 1859: Great Yarmouth (2 seats)
| Party | Candidate | Votes | % | ±% |
|---|---|---|---|---|
| Conservative | Edmund Lacon | 699 | 28.4 | +4.4 |
| Conservative | Henry Stracey | 659 | 26.8 | +6.0 |
| Liberal | Edward Watkin | 568 | 23.1 | −4.1 |
| Liberal | Adolphus William Young | 536 | 21.8 | −6.3 |
| Majority | | 91 | 3.7 | N/A |
| Turnout | | 1,231 (est) | 92.8 (est) | +9.8 |
| Registered electors | | 1,326 | | |
| Conservative gain from Independent Whig | | Swing | N/A | |
| Conservative gain from Liberal | | Swing | +4.0 | |

=== Elections in the 1860s ===
General election 1865: Great Yarmouth (2 seats)
| Party | Candidate | Votes | % | ±% |
|---|---|---|---|---|
| Conservative | Edmund Lacon | 828 | 29.2 | +0.8 |
| Conservative | James Goodson | 784 | 27.7 | +0.9 |
| Liberal | Alexander Brogden | 634 | 22.4 | −0.7 |
| Liberal | Philip Vanderbyl | 589 | 20.8 | −1.0 |
| Majority | | 150 | 5.3 | +1.6 |
| Turnout | | 1,418 (est) | 86.2 (est) | −6.6 |
| Registered electors | | 1,645 | | |
| Conservative hold | | Swing | +0.8 | |
| Conservative hold | | Swing | +0.9 | |

Extensive bribery was found in the seat and its right to return a member was lost. It was then incorporated into East Suffolk and North Norfolk.

== Elections before 1832 ==
General election 1831: Great Yarmouth (2 seats)
| Party | Candidate | Votes | % | ±% |
|---|---|---|---|---|
| Whig | George Anson | 904 | 31.2 | +3.4 |
| Whig | Charles Rumbold | 903 | 31.1 | +3.3 |
| Tory | Andrew Colvile | 549 | 18.9 | −3.3 |
| Tory | Henry Bliss | 543 | 18.7 | −3.5 |
| Majority | | 354 | 12.2 | +6.6 |
| Turnout | | 1,702 | c. 85.1 | c. +1.2 |
| Registered electors | | c. 2,000 | | |
| Whig hold | | Swing | +3.4 | |
| Whig hold | | Swing | +3.4 | |

General election 1830: Great Yarmouth (2 seats)
| Party | Candidate | Votes | % | ±% |
|---|---|---|---|---|
| Whig | George Anson | 944 | 27.8 | |
| Whig | Charles Rumbold | 944 | 27.8 | |
| Tory | Thomas Edmund Campbell | 754 | 22.2 | |
| Tory | Henry Preston | 754 | 22.2 | |
| Majority | | 190 | 5.6 | |
| Turnout | | 1,678 | c. 83.9 | |
| Registered electors | | c. 2,000 | | |
| Whig hold | | Swing | | |
| Whig hold | | Swing | | |

== See also ==
- List of parliamentary constituencies in Norfolk
- Yarmouth (Isle of Wight) (UK Parliament constituency)

== Sources ==
- Robert Beatson, A Chronological Register of Both Houses of Parliament (London: Longman, Hurst, Res & Orme, 1807) A Chronological Register of Both Houses of the British Parliament, from the Union in 1708, to the Third Parliament of the United Kingdom of Great Britain and Ireland, in 1807
- D Brunton & D H Pennington, Members of the Long Parliament (London: George Allen & Unwin, 1954)
- Cobbett's Parliamentary history of England, from the Norman Conquest in 1066 to the year 1803 (London: Thomas Hansard, 1808) titles A-Z
- The Constitutional Year Book for 1913 (London: National Union of Conservative and Unionist Associations, 1913)
- F W S Craig, British Parliamentary Election Results 1832–1885 (2nd edition, Aldershot: Parliamentary Research Services, 1989)
- F W S Craig, British Parliamentary Election Results 1918–1949 (Glasgow: Political Reference Publications, 1969)
- Maija Jansson (ed.), Proceedings in Parliament, 1614 (House of Commons) (Philadelphia: American Philosophical Society, 1988) Proceedings in Parliament, 1614 (House of Commons)
- J E Neale, The Elizabethan House of Commons (London: Jonathan Cape, 1949)
