= William McConnell (trade unionist) =

British trade unionist and political activist (died 1928)

William McConnell (died 21 May 1928) was a British trade unionist and political activist.

McConnell came to prominence while living in the Hammersmith area of London. While there, he joined the Social Democratic Federation (SDF), and in 1898 joined the National Union of Gas Workers and General Labourers. He was a founder member of the South Western District Trades and Labour Council, and then of the Labour Representation Committee for the area.

In 1911, McConnell began working full-time for the union, as an organiser for the London area, then in 1923 he transferred to organise the union in Southampton. He also served as vice chair of the Rope, Twine and Net Trade Board.

McConnell remained involved the SDF's successor, the British Socialist Party, and at the 1918 UK general election, it sponsored him as the Labour Party candidate in Great Yarmouth.
