= Hugh Fenn (died 1409) =

Member of the Parliament of England

Hugh Fenn (died 1409), also written Fenne or atte Fenn, was an English businessman from Great Yarmouth in Norfolk who was active in local and national government during the reigns of Kings Richard II and Henry IV. It was a ship he part-owned which in 1406 captured the future King James I of Scotland.

== Career ==
Born about 1355, the son of Peter Fenn, bailiff of Yarmouth in 1360, and related to John Fenn, three times bailiff between 1368 and 1378, he became a prominent merchant in the town and was elected to various offices in its administration, serving nine terms as bailiff from 1383 on. By 1386 he was a member of the Guild of St George, which united the most important citizens of the town.

By royal appointment, he was appointed controller of customs in 1391, collector of customs between from 1392, and a justice of the peace from 1398. In three Parliaments, those of 1395, January 1397, and 1399, he represented the borough in the House of Commons. In 1397 he was appointed Deputy Butler of England, serving under three Chief Butlers in succession, the last being Sir Thomas Chaucer. From 1398, he sat on various royal commissions to do with trade and shipping.

On his own account and in partnerships he traded in substantial quantities of fish, wine, cloth, salt and grain, owning or part-owning a number of ships that sailed in the North Sea, the Baltic and down to the English-controlled port of Bordeaux. Among many local people of influence with whom he was involved financially were Sir John Fastolf, father of the illustrious Sir John Fastolf, and the MP and sheriff of Norfolk and Suffolk, Ralph Ramsey. In March 1404 he was appointed Mayor of the Staple, controlling all wool and leather exports from East Anglia.

Navigation in English waters in these years was not always safe. In 1402 a ship belonging to Fenn, the Michael, was seized off Plymouth by a vessel from Rostock, one of a number of incidents taken up by the government of Henry IV with the Hanseatic League. On 22 March 1406 a ship of which he owned one-third was off Flamborough Head when it seized the Maryenknyght from Danzig, sailing out of Leith with a cargo of wool and leather. On board was the 11 year old Prince James, heir to the throne of Scotland, who had been sent to France by his father King Robert III under the care of the Earl of Orkney. King Henry IV made a prisoner of the unfortunate young prince, who was treated well but not released until 1424, and rewarded Fenn and his co-owners with not only all the cargo of the Hanse vessel but also the privilege of shipping goods out of Yarmouth free of all customs duties to wherever they liked.

In addition to his activities at Yarmouth, he was also involved in dealings in Norwich, acquiring on his own or in partnerships various properties. In and outside Yarmouth itself, he owned business premises and lands.

== Death and legacy ==
Making his will on 14 January 1409, he asked to be buried in St Nicholas Church, Yarmouth, next to the tomb of his father. The will, proved in Norwich on 25 February 1409, divided his assets between his three surviving sons, with his wife Christine keeping an interest for life in a substantial portion. Before 1412, she married Peter Savage, another Yarmouth burgess. Of their children:

- The eldest son Thomas also became a man of importance in Yarmouth serving in various municipal functions, including five terms as bailiff from 1432 onwards and he or a namesake being collector of customs from 1451 to 1460. In 1438 he granted some of the lands that had been his father's at Herringby and elsewhere to Sir John Fastolf and others. The name of his wife is not known but his son and heir was Hugh Fenn (died 1476), whose daughter Margaret married George Nevill, 4th Baron Bergavenny.
- The second son Hugh became prominent in business in London, dealing in fish, and died about 1420.
- The third son Myles disappears from the records.
