= Percy Jewson =

English businessman and National Liberal politician

Percy William Jewson (16 February 1881 – 18 April 1962) was an English businessman and National Liberal politician from Norwich. He sat in the House of Commons from 1941 to 1945 as MP for Great Yarmouth.

== Career ==
Jewson was the son of John William Jewson, and his wife Henrietta. He was the older brother of the architect Norman Jewson. He was involved for most of his career with the family's timber importing firm of Jewson and Sons Ltd. During World War I he served in France and Belgium as an officer of the Worcestershire Regiment, and was wounded.

He was Lord Mayor of Norwich for 1934–35, and president of Norwich Chamber of Commerce from 1940 to 1946.

By 1941 he was the chairman of Norwich Central Liberal Association. Sir Arthur Harbord, the National Liberal Member of Parliament (MP) for Yarmouth, died in February 1941. At a joint meeting of the constituency's Conservative and National Liberal Associations, Jewson was selected on 31 March as the National Government candidate for the Great Yarmouth by-election, 1941.

The parties in the coalition had agreed not to contest vacancies which arose in seats held by the other government parties, and Jewson was returned unopposed at the close of nominations on 8 April. He held the seat until the 1945 general election, when he was defeated by the Labour Party candidate Ernest Kinghorn.

== Tennis ==
Jewson was involved in tennis for most of his life. As was a doubles player he represented Norfolk in many inter-county championships, and was also successful in many tournaments in East Anglia. He became a chairman of the Lawn Tennis Association, and was an honorary vice-president of the Association until his death.

== Death ==
Jewson died on 18 April 1962 aged 81 at a nursing home in Norwich. He married Ethel Marion Boardman; their son Charles was Lord Mayor of Norwich 1965–66.

Parliament of the United Kingdom
Preceded by Arthur Harbord	Member of Parliament for Yarmouth; 1941 – 1945	Succeeded by Ernest Kinghorn
