= Roger Adams (MP) =

English politician

Roger Adams (died 1405), of Great Yarmouth, Norfolk, was an English politician.

== Life ==
Adams married a woman named Agnes at some point before 1399. There is no record of them having children. In the 1376 Parliament, there were complaints that Adams and others were 'terrorising' the poor men of the town, and in 1384, Adams killed Ralph Mawg the elder of Yarmouth, allegedly in self-defence. He died before December 1405.

== Career ==
He held the office of Bailiff in Yarmouth in 1401-1402 just one time before his membership in the Parliament. He imported wine from Gascony, shipped a lot of cloth to the Low Countries, and had a share in the herring trade in Yarmouth, which was the most important commodity of the county then. Adams acted as a trustee of property acquired by Ralph Ramsey in Yarmouth in 1384, and he was to be a mainpernor for this Ramsey at the elections to the second Parliament of 1397. Since 1386 he had been one of the 24 jurats of Yarmouth, his name appeared under the number 12 on the list of members of this council. He was a Member (MP) of the Parliament of England for Great Yarmouth in January 1404.
