= Roger d'Ivry =

Norman landowner and Chief Butler of England (d. 1079)

Roger d'Ivry or d'Ivri or Rog'ive or Roger Perceval (died 1079) was an 11th-century nobleman from Ivry-la-Bataille in Normandy. He was the younger son of Robert de Breval and his wife, Albreda, daughter of Rodolph, Lord of Ivry.

He took part in William of Normandy's conquest of England in 1066 and founded the Abbey of Notre-Dame-d'Ivry in 1071. D'Ivry was a sworn brother-in-arms of Robert D'Oyly and the Domesday Book records that in 1086 D'Oyly and d'Ivry held a number of manors in various counties either partitioned between the two of them or administered in common. He was appointed hereditary Chief Butler to King William, just as he had been in Normandy.

Roger d'Ivry held estates in Bedfordshire, Buckinghamshire, Gloucestershire, Huntingdonshire, Oxfordshire and Warwickshire. His estates in Oxfordshire included Beckley, Forest Hill, Hampton Gay, Holton, Horspath, Mixbury, North Leigh, Rousham, Shirburn, Thrupp, Wolvercote, Woodeaton and Worton. One of the properties held by d'Ivry later became Beckley Park, described as a Tudor hunting lodge in the 1300s, which still stands.

D'Ivry was married to Adeline or Adelina, eldest daughter of Hugh de Grandmesnil. and had three sons, Roger, Hugh and Geoffrey. He predeceased his wife who died in the latter part of 1110. He was succeeded on his death by his eldest son Roger, who was forced to flee to Normandy after William Rufus seized the English throne in 1087 and died there soon afterwards. Many of the family estates were confiscated by the crown and the position of Chief Butler passed to the d'Aubigny family. Geoffrey and a sister Adeline later had some lands restored to them.
