= Arthur Harbord =

British politician

Sir Arthur Harbord CBE JP MP

Member of Parliament for Great Yarmouth
- In office 1929–1941
- Preceded by: Sir Frank Meyer
- Succeeded by: Percy Jewson

Personal details
- Born: Arthur Harbord; 12 December 1865 Great Yarmouth, Norfolk, England
- Died: 24 February 1941 (aged 75) Great Yarmouth, Norfolk, England

Sir Arthur Harbord, CBE, JP (12 December 1865 – 24 February 1941) was a British Liberal, later Liberal National politician.

Harbord was educated at the British School and at Winchester House School in Great Yarmouth. He was married to Charlotte Belward and they had two daughters.

Harbord commenced his political career with his election to the Great Yarmouth Board of Guardians in 1894 and was its chairman for four years. In 1898 he won election to the Town Council, of which he was created an Alderman in 1916. He served as Mayor of Great Yarmouth in 1917–18, 1918–19 and again from 1934 to 1935. He was a justice of the peace and served on many local government, other public and charitable committees.

He was first elected member of parliament (MP) for Great Yarmouth at the 1922 general election and won again in 1923. However he lost the seat in 1924. He won the division back at the 1929 general election.

In the Liberal split of September 1931 when Sir John Simon formed the National Liberal group in Parliament to continue giving support to the National Government of prime minister Ramsay MacDonald, Harbord decided to leave the official Liberals led by Herbert Samuel and join the Simonites. He held Great Yarmouth as a Liberal National at the 1931 general election and again in 1935. He represented the seat until his death in 1941.

He was appointed a CBE in 1935 for political and public service and knighted in 1939.

Parliament of the United Kingdom
Preceded by Arthur Fell	Member of Parliament for Great Yarmouth; 1922–1924	Succeeded by Sir Frank Meyer, Bt.
Preceded by Sir Frank Meyer, Bt.	Member of Parliament for Great Yarmouth; 1929–1941	Succeeded by Percy Jewson
