= Michael Fell (artist) =

British artist (1939–2023)

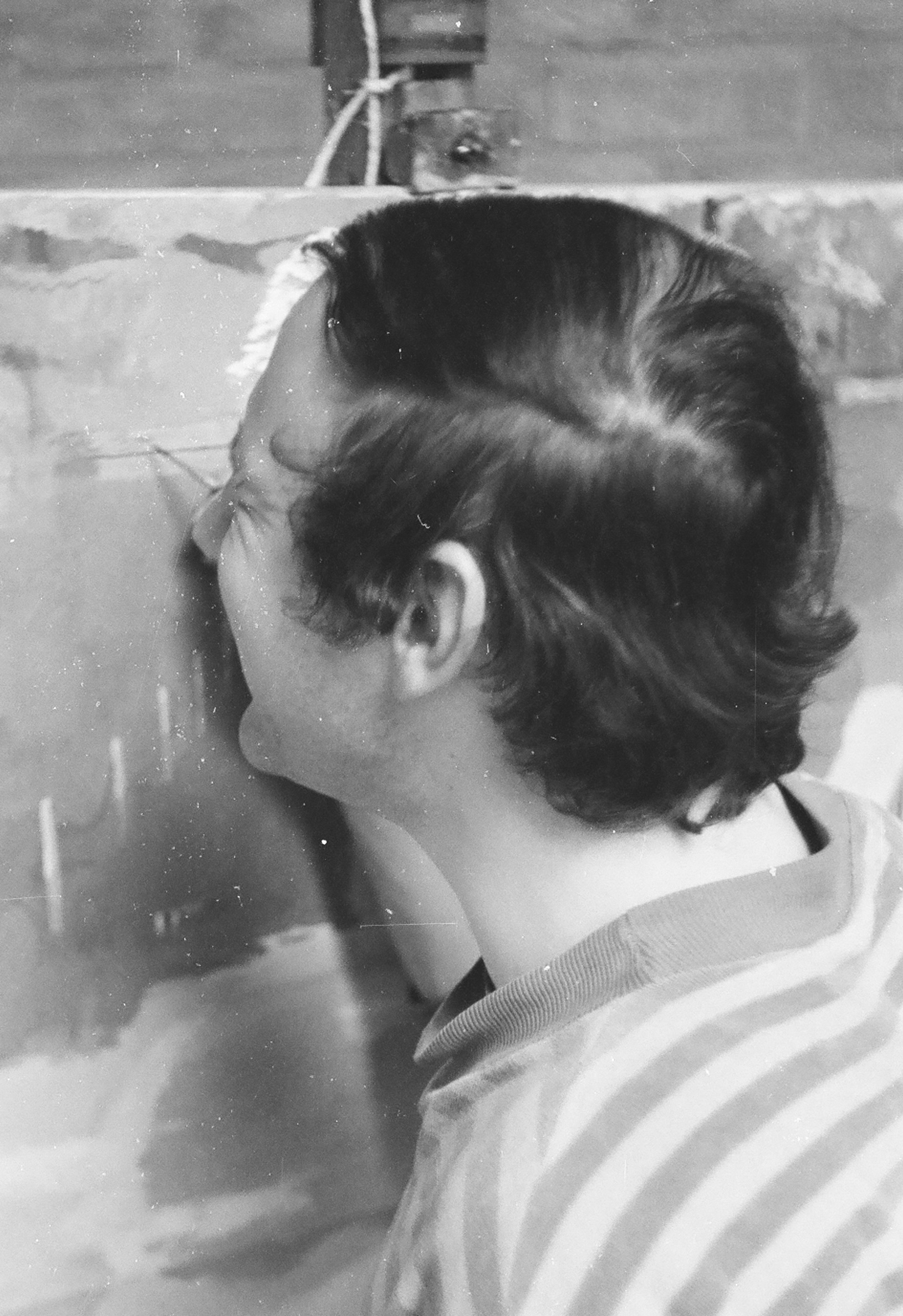
- Michael Fell working in his London studio, c. 1970
- Born: 31 January 1939; Great Dunmow, Essex, England
- Died: 23 March 2023 (aged 84); Toulouse, France
- Education: • St Martins School of Art • City and Guilds of London Art School
- Father: Sir Anthony Fell

Michael Fell Hon RE (31 January 1939 – 12 March 2023) was a British painter, printmaker and draftsman in the figurative tradition. Fell was active in both Britain and France, exhibiting paintings, drawings and prints in Britain, the United States of America and France over the course of his life. Fell's art deploys brilliant colour in oil and controlled engraving techniques, to depict features of ordinary life, often against a background of religious imagery, and historic, religious and literary allusion. His work is held in public collections including the British Museum, the British Council, and the Ashmolean Museum in Oxford.

== Early life and family ==
Fell was the first of two children born to the politician Sir Anthony Fell and his wife, June Fell. In the 1960s, Fell studied at St Martins School of Art and the City and Guilds of London Art School in London. He also travelled in Europe, including on a travelling scholarship studying the work of the great masters in Florence and Rome, where he encountered the physicist, Bruno Touschek.

== Career ==
Fell taught at the City and Guilds of London Art School from the early 1970s to 1996, acting as Head of Foundation from 1984.

He was Chairman of the Society of Designer Craftsmen between 1984 and 1987. In this time he argued for a policy by museums and public galleries of promoting a broader range of contemporary work.

He was elected as an honorary fellow of the Royal Society of Painter-Printmakers in 1999.

During his career, as well as exhibiting regularly at the Royal Academy, Fell also exhibited internationally, including at: Wice Gallery, Paris; Abbey de Flaran, Gers, France; Galleria Renata, Chicago; and the Belanthi Gallery, New York.

== London work ==
Fell spent the 1970s and early 1980s in London. In this time his work focussing on comic and tragic elements of life in London was shown regularly at the Jordan Gallery, Camden, London. In 1972 prints of his on these themes were exhibited at the British Museum, London.

== East Anglian work ==
In the mid-1980s Fell moved to Bungay in East Anglia, living in and supervising a restoration of the Music House on Bridge Street, a Georgian property which the French aristocrat and writer François-René de Chateaubriand had lived in and written about. Fell arranged for a plaque to be placed on the Music House commemorating the connection with Chateaubriand.

Fell's work in this period explored the personalities, nature and architecture characterising East Anglian town life. His work on these themes was subsequently exhibited at Christchurch Mansion, Ipswich, in 2001.

== Gascon work ==
From the 1970s onwards, Fell spent summers in a studio based in an ancient ruined farmhouse in the Armagnac region of Southwestern France, which he restored over the succeeding decades. From this studio, Fell produced a large body of landscape paintings, prints and sketches depicting local nature, village life and festivals and his own social scene, which included a variety of figures such as writers Fabrizio Calvi and Theodore Gorton, the English High Court Judge Sir John Vinelott and the French contemporary artist Janine Dufau owner of the nearby Chateau de Bazian.

His Gascon work was the subject of a solo exhibition at the Grosvenor Gallery, London, in 1996.

From 2000 Fell moved full time to Gascony, France, where he spent the next 20 years documenting the nature, architecture and village life of the local area is his work.

As well as exhibiting locally in Gascony, Fell's work from this period was the subject of a solo exhibition at the Bankside Gallery, London, in 2010.
