= Benjamin Cooper =

17th century English politician

Benjamin Cooper was an English politician who sat in the House of Commons from 1621 to 1624.

Cooper was probably the son of Benjamin Cooper. He was admitted at Emmanuel College, Cambridge on 16 May 1612. He was an alderman of Yarmouth. In 1621, he was elected Member of Parliament for Great Yarmouth. He was re-elected MP for Yarmouth in 1624.

Parliament of England
Preceded by Theophilus Finch; George Hardware	Member of Parliament for Great Yarmouth; 1621–1624; With: Edward Owner 1621–1622; George Hardware 1624	Succeeded by Sir John Corbet; Edward Owner
