= John Hacon =

English politician

John Hacon (fl. 1370 – 1406) was an English politician. He sat as MP for Great Yarmouth in February 1383, November 1384, 1385, September 1388, 1391, and 1393.

He also served as deputy butler in Yarmouth from 6 February till 6 November 1382. He served as bailiff of Yarmouth from Michaelmas 1384 till 1385, 1390 till 1391, and 1395 till 1396.

He was the son of Richard Hacon. Before March 1380, he married Alice.
