= William Page (MP) =

16th-century English politician

William Page (died after 1584) was an English politician.

In the 1550s Page was a servant in Venice to Peter Vannes. Returning to England, he became secretary to Francis Russell, 2nd Earl of Bedford, and entered parliament as Bedford's placeman. He was a Member (MP) of the Parliament of England for Bridport in 1559, Oxford in 1563, Saltash in 1571 and 1572.

Page became involved in the case of John Stubbs and his pamphlet A Gaping Gulf, objecting to the proposed marriage between Queen Elizabeth I and Francis, Duke of Anjou, a Roman Catholic who was the brother of the King of France. Intent on distributing copies through Sir Richard Grenville, Page was tried with Stubbs and the publisher Hugh Singleton. Page and Stubbs could have been sentenced to death, but instead had their right hands cut off.
