= Hugh Fastolf =

English Member of Parliament

- Born: before 1361
- Died: c. 1392
- Occupation: Parliamentarian

Hugh Fastolf (before 1361 - c. 1392), of Great Yarmouth and Caister, Norfolk and London, was an English member of parliament (MP).

He was a member of the Parliament of England for Great Yarmouth in 1361, 1366, 1373, January 1377 and October 1377. He was MP for City of London 1381 and ?May 1382. He was MP for Norfolk in November 1390.
