= Ernest Kinghorn =

British politician (1907–2001)

Ernest Kinghorn (1 November 1907 – 15 January 2001) was a British Labour Party politician who sat in the House of Commons from 1945 to 1951. Kinghorn was born in Leeds, and became a teacher after studying at the universities of Leeds, Basle and Lille. During World War II he served as an intelligence officer with the Royal Air Force, and in 1945 he was a staff officer with the Control Commission in Germany.

He unsuccessfully contested the Hexham division of Northumberland at the 1935 general election, but at the general election in July 1945 he was elected as the Member of Parliament (MP) for Great Yarmouth. He was re-elected in 1950, but at the 1951 general election he was defeated by the Conservative Party candidate Sir Anthony Fell. He stood again in 1955, but without success.

He moved to Hanworth in the Middlesex suburbs of London. He was a member of Middlesex County Council from 1958 to 1965 and of the successor Greater London Council from 1964 to 1967 as well as Hounslow Borough Council from 1964 to 1968.

Parliament of the United Kingdom
Preceded by Percy Jewson	Member of Parliament for Yarmouth; 1945 – 1951	Succeeded by Anthony Fell
