= Roger Perceval =

Chief Butler of England

Roger Perceval (died after 1087) was an Anglo-Norman landowner and Chief Butler of England.

He was the son of Roger Perceval or Roger d'Ivry, a Norman who had come to England with William the Conqueror. Roger senior had made a solemn pact with his close friend Robert D'Oilly, a Norman noble who had come to England with him, that they would share equally any benefits they might gain. So when Robert acquired land by marriage to a Saxon heiress, he gave to Roger a parcel of land in Oxfordshire which Roger called the Barony of Yvry, after their home in Normandy. He acquired other land in due course in several counties. He was also made hereditary Chief Butler to King William, as he had been in Normandy.

On his father's death in 1079, Roger junior inherited his lands in Normandy and England, including the Barony of Ivry in Oxfordshire, and the title of Chief Butler. Whilst serving under King William in Normandy, he prevented the King's eldest son, Robert, from seizing the town of Rouen after a quarrel with his father. However, when William's younger son William Rufus seized the English throne after William's death in 1087, Roger sided with Robert as the rightful heir. When William Rufus was ultimately crowned, Roger fled to Normandy and died there soon afterwards. His lands were seized by the crown but later partially restored to Roger's brother Geoffrey and sister Adelisa. The title of hereditary Chief Butler was awarded to the d'Aubigny family.
