= Richard Southwell (died 1514) =

British administrator

Richard Southwell (c. 1449 – 27 September 1514) was a 15th-century English administrator from Norfolk. He was a Marshal of the Exchequer and an administrator for the Duke of Norfolk.

== Early life ==
Richard Southwell was the son of Robert Southwell of Barnham, Norfolk and his wife Isabel Boyes.

== Career ==
During the second half of the fifteenth century, the Southwell name appears increasingly in government matters, with Richard being appointed to a number of commissions and administrative posts. Richard was the Member of Parliament for Yarmouth in 1455 and Escheator of Norfolk in 1455–56, 1459–60 and 1474.

In 1461 Southwell was granted an annuity of 20 marks until he was provided for life with an office with fees of that value. In 1462 Richard was appointed to the office of Marshal of the Exchequer with its accustomed fees during the minority of the son of the Duke of Norfolk. In 1475, with Thomas Archbishop of Canterbury and others, Richard was made responsible for the Duke's manors in Suffolk and Essex, while the Duke was across the sea with King Edward IV.

In 1477, he was again involved with the affairs of Yarmouth; this time as a member of a commission into a complaint by two Prussian merchants. At this time trade with Germany was an important part of the English economy, and any problems were taken seriously. Henry Faute and Hamo Barambroke had complained that a ship called la Mary of Danske, captained by Peter Eybryght, laden with goods and merchandise to the value of £600, while sailing off Yarmouth was driven ashore by evildoers who stole the cargo. This they claimed was contrary to the friendship between the King and Almain, and the offenders should be arrested and imprisoned and restitution made. In 1482, he was a commissioner examining Thomas and Margaret Brygge regarding certain felonies, murders, trespasses and offences committed by them. An unusual commission was one in 1491, when he had to determine whether William Parker was a lunatic from birth or from what date and whether he alienated his lands when in that state. From 1496 to 1504 he was a commissioner of the peace for Norfolk.

== Marriage and family ==
In 1466 Richard married Amy, the coheir and eldest of the four daughters of Edmund Witchingham of Conningsby, Lincolnshire. Since she was an heiress, this marriage established the family at Woodrising, Norfolk.

Richard and his wife Amy had two sons, Robert and Francis, and four daughters, Elizabeth, Katherine, Alice and Amy. The children of Richard Southwell and Amy Witchingham:

- Robert Southwell (d. 30 March 1514), married first Ursula Bohun, daughter of John Bohun of Medhurst in Sussex, and second Elizabeth Calthorpe (d. 1517), the daughter of Sir Philip Calthorpe of Burnham Thorpe, Norfolk. Sir Robert died childless and his heir was his brother Francis' eldest son Richard.
- Francis Southwell (d. 2 September 1512), auditor of the Exchequer, married Dorothy, daughter and co-heiress of William Tendring, of Stoke by Naylond in Suffolk and Little Birch in Essex and Thomasine, daughter of William Sidney.
- Elizabeth, marriedJohn Holdich
- Katherine
- Alice, married John Berney of Redham
- Amy, married Ralph Berney of Wichingham

Richard married, in 1488, the widow Katherine Sturges, daughter of John Williams, and had four more daughters, Katherine, Ursula, Amy and Elizabeth. The children of Richard Southwell and Katherine Sturges:

- Katherine, m. Edmund Jenney of Intwood
- Ursula, m. John Curson of Billingford
- Amy, m. William Wotton of North Tudenham, Baron of the Exchequer, and in 1527 lord of the Manor of St. Cleere
- Elizabeth, m. Robert Crane of Suffolk
