= William Barker (translator) =

16th century English translator

William Barker (fl. 1572) was an English translator.

== Life ==
Barker was born before 1522 and educated in the University of Cambridge at the cost of Anne Boleyn, the second wife of King Henry VIII. He appears to have commenced M.A. in 1540 and to have been a member either of Christ's College or of St. John's College.

After some years spent travelling in Italy, he published Epitaphia et inscriptiones lugubres. He then served as one of the members for Great Yarmouth in the parliaments which met in January 1557/8, January 1558/9, and April 1571 and was M.P. for Bramber in 1562/3.

He was one of the Duke of Norfolk's secretaries, and was deeply implicated in that nobleman's plots. About 4 September 1571, as a result of the discovery of the Ridolfi Plot, he was committed to the Tower of London. At first he denied what was imputed to him, but he was soon induced by fear of the rack to make confessions which seriously involved the duke, who, however, denied many of his statements and contemptuously styled him an Italianified Englishman. Barker spent two years in the Tower and then retreated into obscurity and he was last heard of in 1576.

== Works ==
Barker was probably the author of the following works:

- Epitaphia et inscriptiones lugubres, cum in Italia animi causa peregrinatur, collecta, Lond. 1554, 1566, 4to.
- St. Basil the Great, his Exhortation to his kinsmen to the studie of the Scriptures translated, Lond. 1557, 8vo.
- The viii bookes of Xenophon, containing the institution, schole, and education of Cyrus, the noble king of Persye: also his civil and principal estate, his expedition into Babilon, Syria, and Egypt, and his exhortation before his death to his children. Translated out of Greek into English, Lond. 1567, 8vo. The first full translation of Xenophon's Cyropaedia into English, mainly based on the original Greek but also partially on the earlier translations into Latin (1467) by Francesco Filelfo and Italian by Jacopo Bracciolini (d. 1478), son of Poggio Bracciolini. Another edition containing only six books was printed by R. Wolfe, Lond. n.d. Dedicated to William, earl of Pembroke.
- The Fearfull Fancies of the Florentine Cooper. Written in Tuscane by John Baptist Gelli, one of the free studie of Florence. And for recreation translated into English, Lond. 1568, 1599, 8vo.
- The Nobility of Women
