= John Stubbs =

English pamphleteer

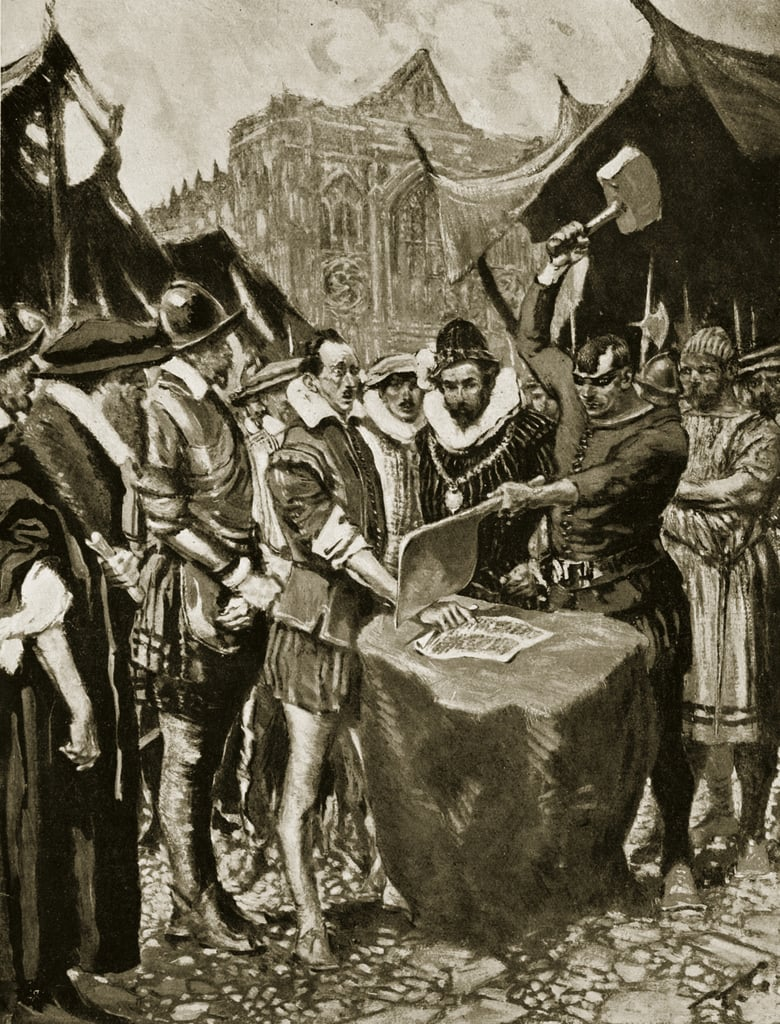
Edward Frank Gillettː Stubbs has his hand cut off (Hutchinson's Story of the British Nation, 1922)

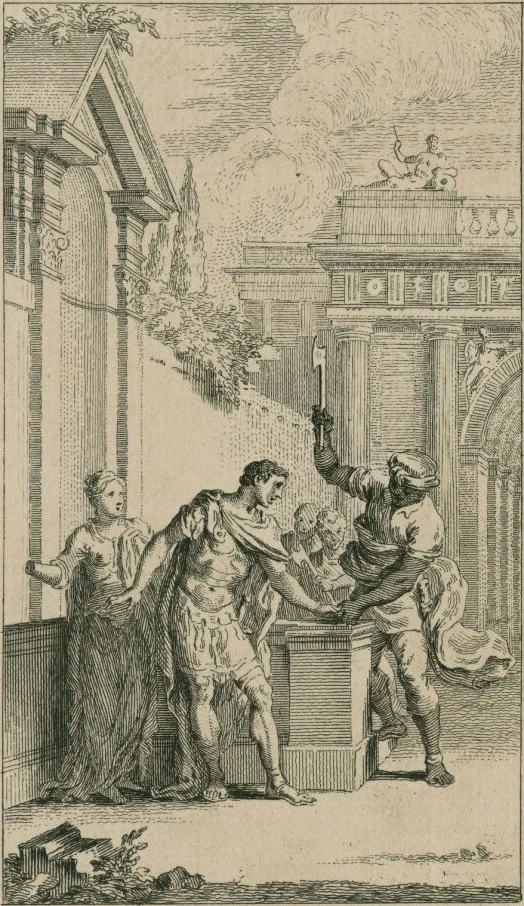
Act III, scene II from Titus Andronicus – Aaron cuts off Titus' hand whilst the already handless Lavinia looks on; Hubert-François Gravelot illustration, engraved by Gerard Vandergucht (1740); Titus Andronicus was dedicated to the year 1579.

John Stubbs (or Stubbe) (c. 1544 in Buxton, England – after 25 September 1589 in Le Havre, France) was an English Puritan, pamphleteer, political commentator and sketch artist during the Elizabethan era, whose right hand was cut off on 3 November 1579 following a conviction for "seditious writing". He died in France in 1589 while on military service and was buried in Le Havre.

== Early life ==
John Stubbs was born in Buxton, Norfolk, and was educated at Trinity College, Cambridge. After reading law at Lincoln's Inn, he lived at Thelveton, Norfolk. He was a committed Puritan, and he opposed the negotiations for marriage between Queen Elizabeth I and Francis, Duke of Anjou, a Roman Catholic and the brother of the King of France.

== Publication of French Marriage pamphlet ==
In 1579 he put his opinions into a pamphlet entitled The Discovery of a Gaping Gulf whereunto England is like to be swallowed by another French Marriage, if the Lord forbid not the banns, by letting her Majesty see the sin and punishment thereof. Copies of the text were later publicly burned in the kitchen stove of Stationer's Hall. His pamphlet argued that at forty-six years old Elizabeth was too old to have children and therefore had no need for marriage. He argued that English values, customs, language and morality would be undermined by so close a relationship with the French monarchy.

Stubbs argued that his objective was to protect the freedom of thought and free speech that he said was associated with Protestantism. The proposed marriage could lead to a restoration of Catholic orthodoxy with its diminution of liberty.

Stubbs undiplomatically described the proposed wedding as a "contrary coupling," "an immoral union, an uneven yoking of the clean ox to the unclean ass, a thing forbidden in the law" as laid down by St Paul, a "more foul and more gross" union that would draw the wrath of God on England and leave the English "pressed down with the heavy loins of a worse people and beaten as with scorpions by a more vile nation."

== Trial, punishment, and further writing ==
Elizabeth's court was displeased by the publication. Circulation of this pamphlet was prohibited, and Stubbs, his printer, and publisher William Page were tried at Westminster, found guilty of "seditious writing" and sentenced to have their right hands cut off by means of a cleaver driven through the wrist by a mallet. Initially Queen Elizabeth had favoured the death penalty but was persuaded by adviser John Jovey to opt for the lesser sentence. The printer was subsequently pardoned by Elizabeth, but in the case of Stubbs and his publisher the sentence was carried out, and Stubbs' right hand was cut off on 3 November 1579. At the time Stubbs protested his loyalty to the Crown and immediately before the public dismemberment delivered a shocking pun: "Pray for me now my calamity is at hand." His right hand having been cut off, he removed his hat with his left hand and cried "God Save the Queen!" before fainting.

Stubbs was subsequently imprisoned for eighteen months. On being released in 1581 he continued to write, publishing, among other pamphlets, a reply to Cardinal Allen's Defence of the English Catholics. Despite his punishment, he remained a loyal subject of Queen Elizabeth and later served in the House of Commons as MP for Great Yarmouth in the English Parliament of 1589.

He died and was buried with military honours on the shore at Le Havre, France, where he seems to have gone to volunteer for military service (despite the disability caused by his punishment) under Henry of Navarre. His will, dated 25 September 1589, was probated on 27 June 1590.

== Marriage and issue ==
John Stubbs married Anne de Vere (d. 1617), widow of Christopher Shernborne (d. 7 July 1575), and daughter of Aubrey de Vere, second son of John de Vere, 15th Earl of Oxford. By her marriage to Christopher Shernborne, Anne had a son, Francis Shernborne, esquire, who was the last of the male line to bear the surname. Francis Shernborne married Martha Colt, said to have been the daughter of Sir George Colt of Cavendish, Suffolk, by whom he had a daughter and heir, Mary Colt, who married Sir Augustine Sotherton of Taverham, near Norwich.

Stubbs was brother-in-law of the noted Puritan divine Thomas Cartwright, who married his sister Alice. Anne Stubbs, John's wife, was a Brownist.

Parliament of England
Preceded by William Grice; Thomas Damet	Member of Parliament for Great Yarmouth; 1588-1593; With: Roger Drury	Succeeded by Thomas Damet; John Felton

== Bibliography ==
- Berry, Lloyd E., ed. (1968). John Stubbs's Gaping Gulf with Letters and Other Relevant Documents. Charlottesville: University Press of Virginia. p. xxiv.

Attribution
