= Ralph Ramsey =

Member of the Parliament of England

Ralph Ramsey (died 1419), of Great Yarmouth and West Somerton, Norfolk and Kenton, Suffolk, was an English Member of Parliament for Great Yarmouth 1385, 1386, February 1388, September 1388, January 1390, 1391, 1395 and September 1397 and for Suffolk in 1402.
