= Harbord =

Harbord may refer to:

== People ==
- Harbord Harbord (1675?–1742), English landowner and Member of Parliament born Harbord Cropley
- Harbord Harbord, 1st Baron Suffield (1734–1810), British landowner and Member of Parliament
- Arthur Harbord (1865–1941), British politician
- Carl Harbord (1908–1958), English actor
- Charles Harbord (1596–1679), English official, lawyer and politician
- Charles Harbord, 5th Baron Suffield (1830–1914), British courtier and politician
- Charles Harbord, 6th Baron Suffield (1855–1924), British Army officer and politician
- Cyril Harbord (1873–1958), British Indian Army brigadier-general
- Edward Harbord, 3rd Baron Suffield (1781–1835), British politician, anti-slavery campaigner and prison reformer
- Jacqueline Harbord (born 1944), British former figure skater and 1962 national champion
- James Harbord (1866–1947), US Army lieutenant general and business executive
- John Harbord (1812–1896), English Anglican priest and author
- William Harbord (politician) (1635–1692), English Member of Parliament and diplomat
- Sir William Harbord, 1st Baronet (c. 1696–1770), English landowner and Member of Parliament
- William Harbord, 2nd Baron Suffield (1766–1821), English army officer, cricketer and Member of Parliament
- William Harbord (cricketer) (1908–1992), English cricketer

== Other uses ==
- Former name of Freshwater, New South Wales, a suburb of Sydney, Australia
- Harbord Glacier, Victoria Land, Antarctica
- Harbord Collegiate Institute, a secondary school in Toronto, Canada
- Harbord Street, Toronto, Canada - see Harbord Street Bridge

== See also ==
- Harbord Commission, an American commission tasked by President Wilson to study the relationship between the United States and Armenia following World War I, led by James Harbord
