= Horstead Hall =

Coordinates: 52.7370°N 1.3355°E

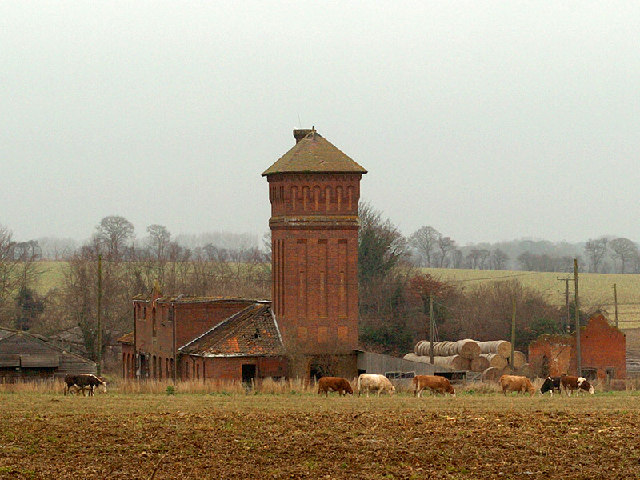
The now derelict stable block and water tower are some of the visible remains of Horstead Hall, pictured here in 2006

Horstead Hall was a country house in Norfolk that was demolished in the 1950s.

The village of Horstead in the county of Norfolk is not short of country houses. Towards Norwich lie Horstead House and Heggatt Hall, while towards Buxton lies the Horstead Hall estate. The house lay in the middle of a substantial park. A seventeenth-century house stood here until 1835, when it was rebuilt in the Tudor style by Edward Harbord, 3rd Baron Suffield. The lodges, one at Mayton, the other on the Buxton-Horstead Road, date from this period.

Edward Harbord, 3rd Baron Suffield rebuilt the house for his eldest, Edward Vernon Harbord, 4th Baron Suffield son on his marriage to Miss Gardiner. However, the third Baron died from injuries sustained in a riding accident on the day of the wedding, and the house was adapted for the use of the dowager baroness. Charles Harbord, 5th Baron Suffield was brought up at the hall. Following his inheritance of Gunton Park, the house was let out until it was bought by the Birkbeck family.

Owners included the Batcheler family (18th century), the Suffields, who rebuilt the house, and latterly the Birkbecks. Sir Edward Birkbeck entertained Prime Minister Lord Salisbury there in 1887. During World War II the house was requisitioned by the War Office and used by a cipher unit, who put up numerous huts in the grounds, some of which survive. The hall's Italianate watertower, which stood among outbuildings, now derelict, is visible from the roads around the park. A chapel also survives, equally derelict.

The estate was sold in 1947 and most of the house came down soon after. Today part of the estate is used for quarrying. Substantial estate buildings survive, and part of the house remains, albeit in derelict condition. A pipe organ from the house is in the church at Ashby St. Mary.

== Sources ==
- Millican, Percy: History of Horstead and Stanninghall.
- BBC
- Lord Suffield: My Memories 1830-1913 (London, 1913).
- Norfolk Archives Service
- Norfolk Council
- Norfolk Online Access to Heritage's entry on Horstead Hall
