= Charles Harbord =

Charles Harbord may refer to:

- Charles Harbord (1596–1679), English official, lawyer and politician
- Charles Harbord, 5th Baron Suffield (1830–1914), British peer, courtier and Liberal politician
- Charles Harbord, 6th Baron Suffield (1855–1924), British Army officer and Conservative politician
