= Edward Vernon Harbord, 4th Baron Suffield =

British peer

Edward Vernon-Harbord, 4th Baron Suffield (19 June 1813 – 22 August 1853), was a British member of the House of Lords and landowner in Victorian times.

== Family background ==
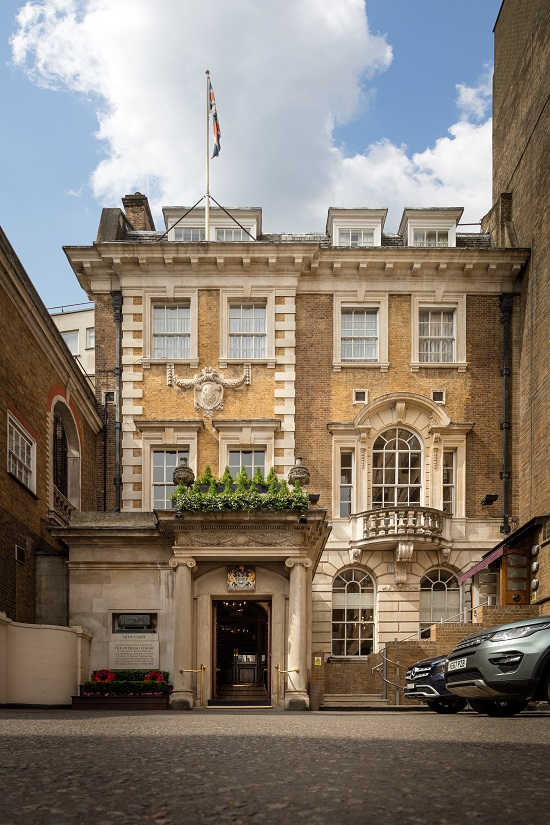
Vernon House, Park Place, London

The elder son of Edward Harbord, 3rd Baron Suffield, by his first wife the Hon. Georgiana Venables-Vernon (1788–1824), daughter and heiress of George Venables-Vernon, 2nd Baron Vernon, he was educated at Eton and Christ Church, Oxford.

== Life ==
A keen sportsman, Vernon-Harbord married on 1 September 1835 the Hon. Charlotte Gardner (1810–1859), only daughter of Vice-Admiral Alan Gardner, 2nd Baron Gardner, after his father suffered a fatal fall from his horse on Constitution Hill in 1835. He then inherited the ancestral estates in Norfolk and London as well as the Harbord family titles.

Suffield served as President of MCC (for 1836/37) and Master of the Quorn (for 1838/39), and his wife became Lady-in-Waiting to HRH the Duchess of Cambridge in 1852.

He died without legitimate issue on 22 August 1853, aged 40, at Gunton Park, Norfolk, when his half-brother, the Hon. Charles Harbord, succeeded as the 5th Baron Suffield.

== See also ==
- Gunton Park
- Horstead Hall

== Arms ==
Coat of arms of Edward Vernon-Harbord
Crest On a Chapeau Gules doubled Ermine a Lion couchant Argent Escutcheon Quarterly: 1st and 4th, quarterly Azure and Gules four Lions rampant Argent and in the centre an Imperial Crown Or (Harbord); 2nd and 3rd, Argent a Fleur-de-lys Gules (Morden) Supporters Dexter: a Lion Or charged on the shoulder with a Fleur-de-lys Gules and gorged with a Crown Flory Chain reflexed over the back Azure; Sinister: a Leopard guardant Proper gorged with a similar Coronet and Chain Or Motto Æquanimiter (Even-mindedly) Other versions

Peerage of Great Britain
Preceded by Edward Harbord	Baron Suffield; 1835–1853	Succeeded by Charles Harbord
Baronetage of Great Britain
Preceded by Edward Harbord	Baronet (of Gunton); 1835–1853	Succeeded by Charles Harbord
