= Stephen Lushington (judge) =

British judge and Member of Parliament (1782–1873)

The Right Honourable Stephen Lushington
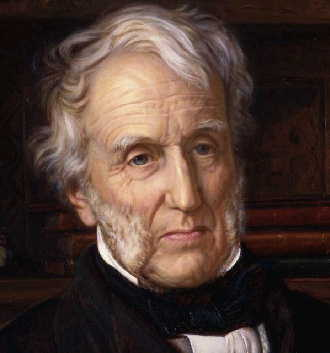
- 1862 portrait (detail) by William Holman Hunt
- Born: 14 January 1782; South Hill Park, Berkshire
- Died: 19 January 1873 (aged 91); Ockham Park, Surrey
- Resting place: Ockham, Surrey
- Education: Christ Church, Oxford, Inner Temple
- Occupation: judge
- Known for: Slavery abolitionist

Stephen Lushington (14 January 1782 – 19 January 1873), generally known as Dr Lushington, was a British judge, Member of Parliament and a radical for the abolition of slavery and capital punishment. He served as Judge of the High Court of Admiralty from 1838 to 1867.

== Early life and education ==
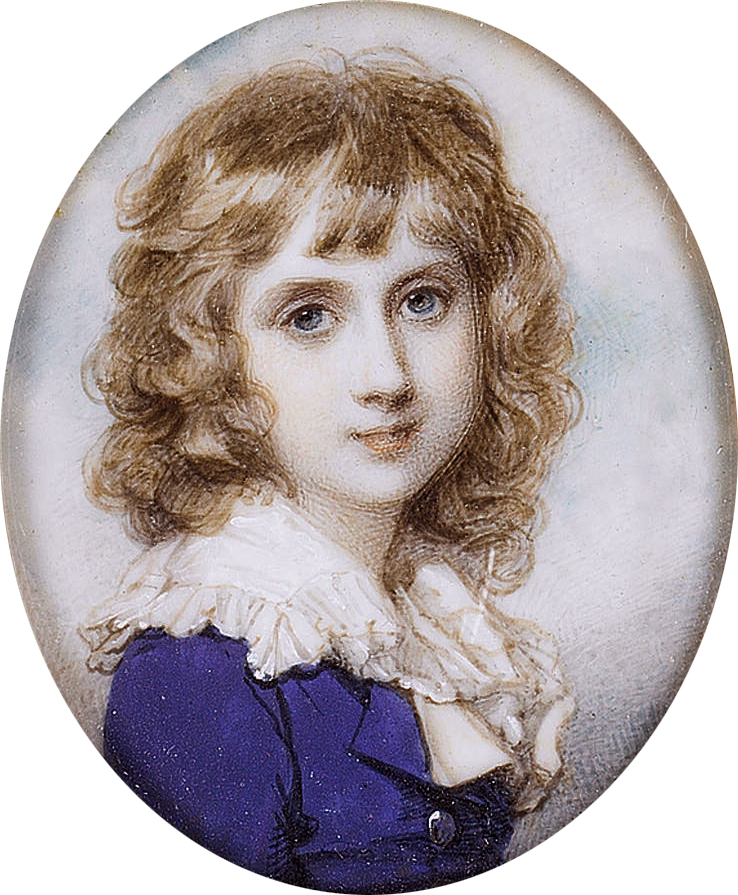
Stephen, 1789 (Richard Cosway)

Lushington was the second son of Sir Stephen Lushington, 1st Baronet (1744–1807), a member of parliament and Chairman of the British East India Company. He was educated at Eton College and Christ Church, Oxford, where he matriculated in 1797 at age 15. He was then elected a fellow of All Souls in 1802.

An amateur cricketer who made three known appearances in historically important matches in 1799, Lushington was mainly associated with Surrey.

== In politics ==
In 1806, Lushington entered Parliament as Whig member for Great Yarmouth, and spoke in the Commons in favour of the bill to abolish the slave trade in February 1807.

Re-elected in 1808, Lushington lost the confidence of his patron Harbord Harbord, 1st Baron Suffield. He was a supporter of Catholic emancipation, at the time an unpopular cause. A few months into the new session, he resigned his seat. It came after the defeat of a motion he had proposed to castigate the behaviour of Sir Home Popham.

Lushington in 1818 supported a bill intended to regulate climbing boys. He returned to Parliament as the MP for Ilchester in 1820, and subsequently also represented Tregony, Winchelsea and Tower Hamlets. An account of one of his speeches published in 1828 in the Mirror of Parliament involved Lushington in a libel case, for which John Dickens and John Henry Barrow, the father and uncle of Charles Dickens, were respectively witness and defendant.

As a radical, Lushington proposed or attempted to propose motions to recognise the independence of South America from Spain (1820) and spoke in favour of repealing the civil disabilities which applied to Jews. He proposed to abolish capital punishment (1840), and later served on the 1864 Royal Commission on the issue. He was also a supporter of moderate Parliamentary reform, and advocated triennial parliaments and the secret ballot. Lushington has also been described as a "Whig legal placeman". He had political links to Henry Brougham, and particularly to Lord John Russell.

In 1841 Lushington left Parliament, which he had to do in consequence of the Admiralty Court Act 1840 and his position as judge.

== Legal career ==
Lushington joined the Inner Temple in 1801, and was called to the bar in 1806. After giving up his seat in Parliament, he concentrated on his legal practice, in 1808 taking the degree of Doctor of Civil Law and being admitted to Doctors' Commons.

=== Byron case ===
In 1816 Lushington became legal advisor to Lady Byron, not long after she had become effectively separated from her husband, Lord Byron. He saw first Judith Lady Noel, her mother, who applied to Lushington on the advice of Sir Samuel Romilly, and with an introduction through Samuel Heywood; she brought Lady Byron's statement to London. The outcome of this first meeting, on 24 January 1816, was a draft of a letter for Sir Ralph Noel, 6th Baronet, Lady Byron's father, to send to Lord Byron, which was done four days later. Legal steps began as Lushington representing Lady Byron and John Hanson representing Lord Byron met Sir Ralph Noel on 21 February at Mivart's Hotel.

The case was settled, with arbitration by Sir Samuel Shepherd, in March 1816, Lady Byron retaining custody of her daughter Ada Lovelace, and reaching a property settlement. Lushington is said to have let scandalous rumours about Byron proceed, by keeping back details of the points in his client's case, as a tactic. Five years later, he married a close friend of Lady Byron, who kept him as her lawyer.

=== Trial of Queen Caroline ===
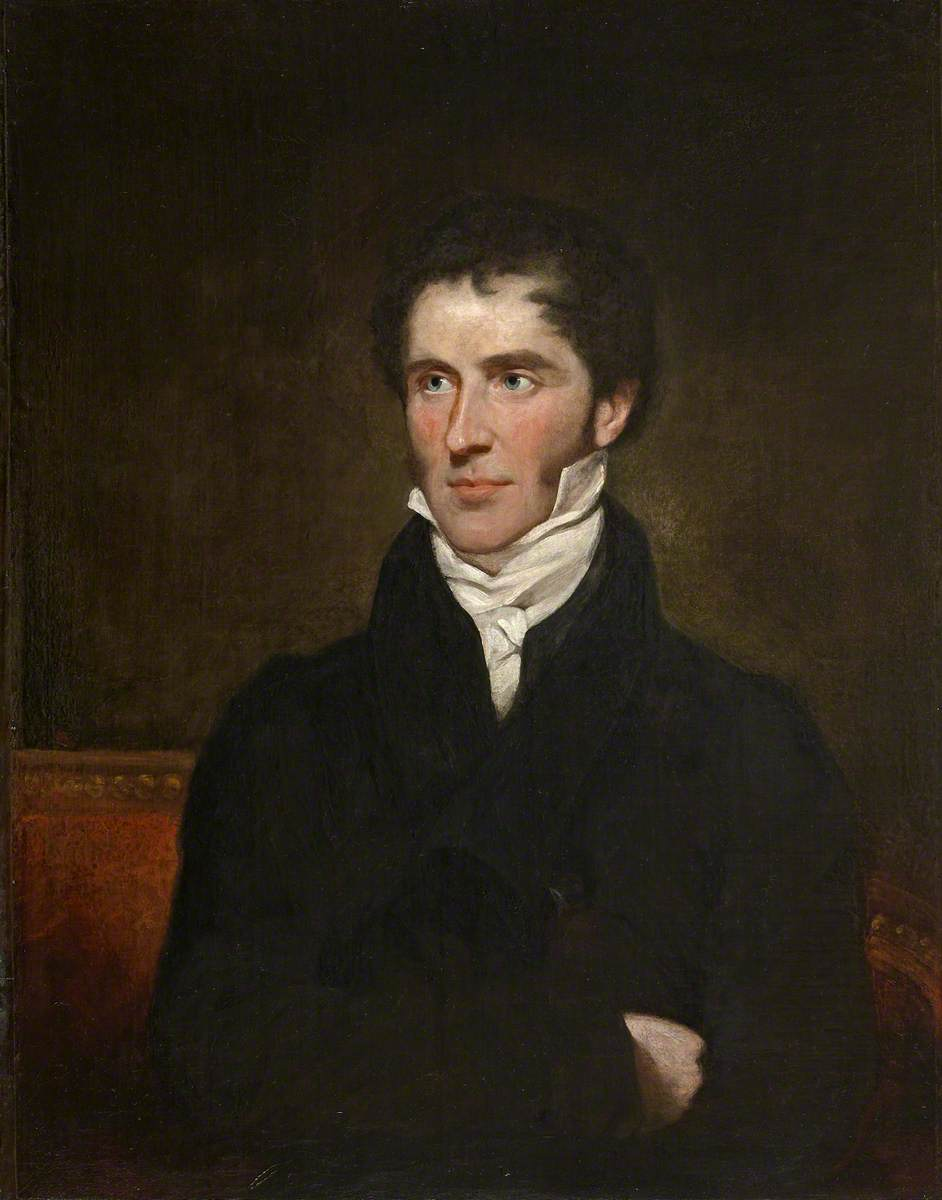
Stephen Lushington, portrait from early 1820s

In 1820 Lushington was one of the counsel retained by Queen Caroline, and spoke in her defence during her trial before the House of Lords. He was brought onto the legal team, with Nicholas Conyngham Tindal, Thomas Wilde and John Williams, by Henry Brougham and Thomas Denman, the Queen's law officers. They were instructed by William Vizard, her solicitor. Lushington gave advice as a civil law jurist, and with Denman summarised the defence on 23 October 1820.

=== Judge ===
In 1828 he was appointed judge of the Consistory Court of London. In 1838 he was made a Privy Counsellor and became judge of the High Court of Admiralty, in which post he continued until 1867.

Lushington was also Dean of Arches from 1858 to 1867, when he retired from all his posts due to ill health. His personal religious views have been described as latitudinarian.

==== The Gorham judgement ====
The Gorham case, pitting George Cornelius Gorham against his bishop in the diocese of Exeter, Henry Phillpotts, came on appeal to the Judicial Committee of the Privy Council. Lushington was centrally involved in the proceedings there. He was the only committee member with relevant legal experience, and influenced the outcome, which overturned the verdict of the Court of Arches, given by Herbert Jenner-Fust, finding in favour of Gorham.

Lushington argued in terms of process and expediency: Phillpotts was intending Gorham to fail his examination, itself unusual, before moving to a new living, and the precedent was dangerous for the Church. The copious theological arguments brought were put on one team. On the other hand, Waddams considers that Lushington's own views were in play. The Privy Council judgement was given on 8 March 1850, and over the summer of that year Gorham moved into his new living of Brampford Speke, a clear victory of evangelicals over the High churchmen of the Church of England.

== Abolitionist ==
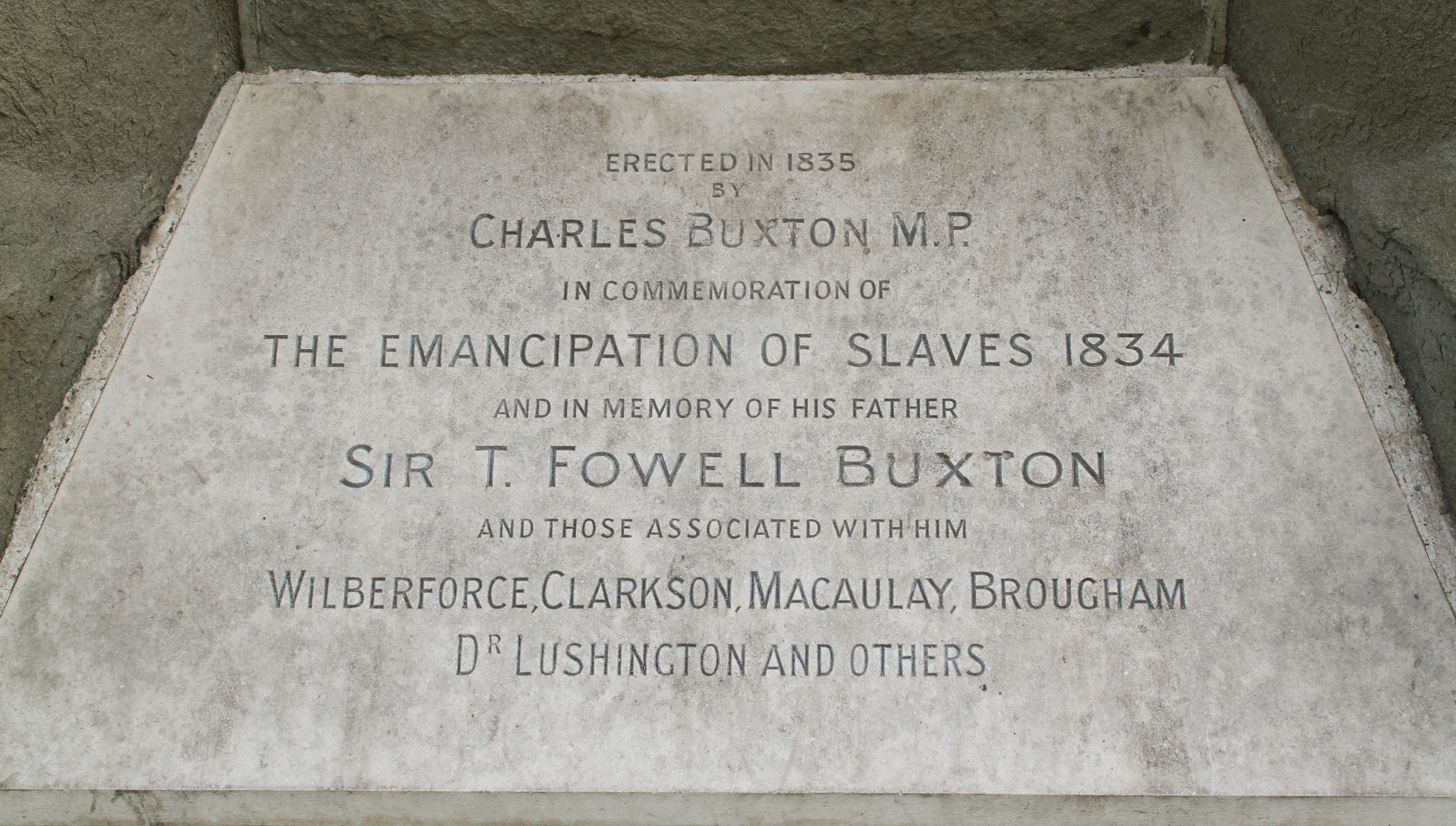
As "Dr. Lushington", Stephen Lushington's name appears on the Buxton Memorial Fountain marking the abolition of slavery in the British Empire

Lushington was a lifelong advocate of the anti-slavery cause. He committed much time to it, and had significant influence in the British abolitionist movement. His brother Sir Henry Lushington, 2nd Baronet was a joint owner in 1817 of the Greenwood estate in Jamaica. He was married to Frances Maria Lewis, daughter of Matthew Lewis who owned estates in Jamaica; and worked in Boldero & Lushington, a bank founded by his maternal grandfather John Boldero and offering mortgages on West Indian plantations. Other family members were also slave owners or beneficiaries. Those include William Lushington MP (1747–1823), Stephen Lushington's uncle, and another brother, Charles Lushington (1785–1866), with his wife Sarah Gascoyne a beneficiary of the Jamaica Clarendon Seven Plantations estates.

On his return to Parliament in 1821, Lushington supported William Wilberforce's call on the government to put pressure on countries still allowing the slave trade, and opposed relief for West Indian sugar estates. He succeeded in having a Slave Trade Acts consolidation bill passed, as the Slave Trade Act 1824. It included legislation classifying the slave traffic as piracy, and saw the end of trading in slaves between the colonies of the British Empire. Around this time he began to work closely with the abolitionist leader Thomas Fowell Buxton.

In 1824–5, Lushington championed the cause of Louis Celeste Lecesne. Lecesne and John Escoffery were free people of colour expelled from Jamaica, and subsequently involved in a libel suit with George Wilson Bridges. Lushington argued in the House of Commons in an 1824 speech that they had been subject to discrimination based on skin colour detrimental to their constitutional rights. Lecesne and Escoffery were both slave-owners, a fact that Lushington took as establishing their social position. In March 1827, Lushington spoke in Parliament about a sermon given by Bridges in St Ann Parish, Jamaica against missionaries, and an attack on a mission house there.

Fowell Buxton who was a member of parliament and Lushington took an interest in a bequest by Jane Mico that had been stuck for 200 years. They believed that her bequest would supply education and in particular religious education in the colonies as slaves were freed. They were able to establish a new set of trustees were established for Mico's funds. Lushington and Buxton were trustees and they obtained government grants ("Negro Education Grant") that were used to supplement the fund. Mico University College in Jamaica still exists based on this gift and Lushington is one of the house names.

With Buxton, William Allen, Thomas Hodgkin and Richard King, Lushington was one of the leaders of the Aborigines' Protection Society. When Hodgkin clashed with the administrator Benjamin Harrison at Guy's Hospital, Lushington took his team, as did Ebenezer Pye-Smith of the staff.

Lushington and his daughters were part of the group of abolitionists who supported the education of the fugitives Ellen and William Craft in the early 1850s. It took place in the school at Ockham founded by Lady Byron.

== Later life ==
In later life, Lushington lived at Ockham Park, belonging to Ada Lovelace and her husband William King-Noel, 1st Earl of Lovelace. He took a lease on it around 1846, after the Lovelaces moved away. Some of his family had been in residence there, from not long after his wife's death in 1837 (see below). The Lovelaces began to move out from about 1840, when William bought and built on East Horsley Park, an adjoining property belonging to the family of William Currie, and Ada spent her time mainly in London and Somerset. In 1852 Lushington acted for Lady Byron, Ada's mother, to take control of Ada's finances during her final illness.

At Ockham Park, Lushington had noted guests. They included Edward Lear, close to Franklin Lushington, the brother of Henry Lushington, relations from another branch of the family. Lear encountered Elizabeth Gaskell there in 1862. The American abolitionist Charles Sumner, who as a young man had taken Lushington to be "one of the ablest men in England", was a visitor there in 1857.

Lushington died at Ockham Park on 19 January 1873. A brass tablet to his memory was placed on the south wall of the nave of All Saints Church, Ockham.

== Family ==
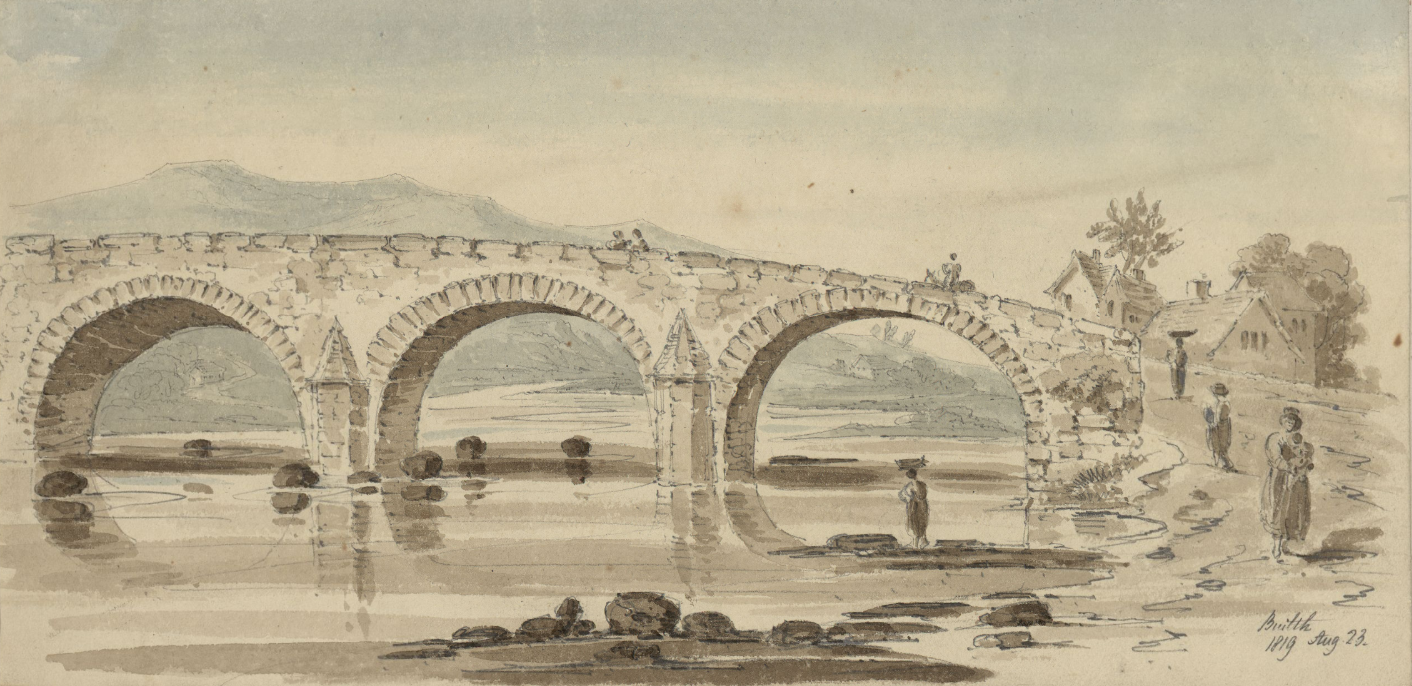
Sarah Grace Carr: The bridge at Builth, 1819

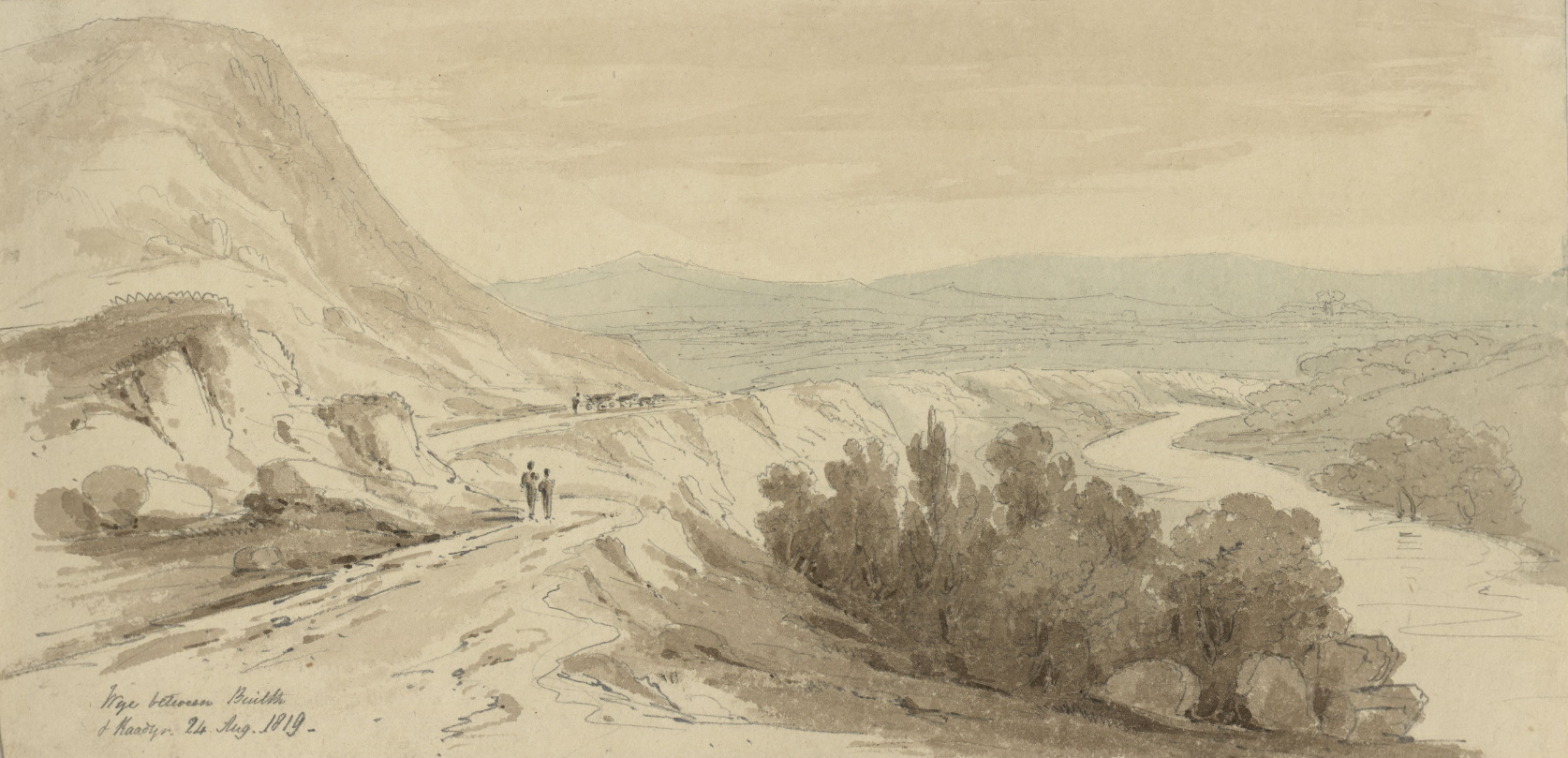
Wye between Builth and Rhayader, 1819

Lushington married in 1821 Sarah Grace Carr (1794–1837), daughter of the lawyer Thomas William Carr (1770–1829). Sarah was the eldest in a family of five daughters and three sons; her mother Frances was a good friend of Anna Laetitia Barbauld, who addressed her piece True Magicians to Sarah, whom she mentored. Sarah was a talented amateur artist: During a tour of Wales in 1819, she drew 51 sketches, which are now in the possession of the National Library of Wales.

Stephen and Sarah Lushington had ten children, five daughters and five sons. The sons included:

- Edward Harbord Lushington (1822–1904)
- William Bryan Lushington (born 1824), barrister
- Stephen Lushington (1830–1860), died at Puri
- The twins Vernon Lushington (1832–1912) and Godfrey Lushington (1832–1907). After Sarah's death in 1837, they were brought up at Ockham Park by one of Sarah's sisters. According to an 1838 letter of Joanna Baillie, in 1838 a Miss Carr lived with Stephen Lushington and cared for the whole family.

Of the daughters, Edith Grace married in 1858 John Pilkington Norris.

Parliament of the United Kingdom
Preceded by Sir Thomas Troubridge; Thomas Jervis	Member of Parliament for Great Yarmouth; 1806–1808; With: Edward Harbord	Succeeded by Edward Harbord; Giffin Wilson
Preceded by Sir Isaac Coffin; John William Drage Merest	Member of Parliament for Ilchester; 1820–1826; With: Sir Isaac Coffin	Succeeded by John Williams; Richard Sharp
Preceded by James O'Callaghan; Viscount Barnard	Member of Parliament for Tregony; 1826–1830; With: James Brougham	Succeeded by James Adam Gordon; James Mackillop
Preceded by John Williams; Henry Dundas	Member of Parliament for Winchelsea; April 1831; With: John Williams	Succeeded by James Brougham; John Williams
Preceded by Michael Bruce; James Joseph Hope-Vere	Member of Parliament for Ilchester; 1831–1832; With: Edward Robert Petre	Constituency abolished
New constituency	Member of Parliament for Tower Hamlets; 1832–1841; With: Sir William Clay	Succeeded by Sir William Clay; Charles Richard Fox
Legal offices
Preceded by Sir John Dodson	Dean of Arches; 1858–1867	Succeeded by Sir Robert Phillimore
