= John Harbord, 8th Baron Suffield =

John Harbord, 8th Baron Suffield (1 July 1907 – 23 June 1945), of Gunton Park, near Norwich, Norfolk, was a British soldier, peer, and baronet, a member of the House of Lords from 1943 to 1945.

John Harbord was the younger of the two sons of Charles Harbord, 6th Baron Suffield and his wife Evelyn Louisa Wilson-Patten. His mother was a daughter of Captain Eustace John Wilson-Patten and Emily Constantia Thynne (1840–1926), a granddaughter of Thomas Thynne, 2nd Marquess of Bath. She later married again and became Marchioness of Headfort.

He had one older brother, elder brother Victor Alexander Charles, the 7th Baron, and two sisters, Doris Cecilia and Lettice Evelyn.

The young Harbord was educated at Gresham's School, Holt. He was commissioned into the 108th Suffolk and Norfolk Yeomanry. On 11 June 1943 he succeeded his brother as Baron Suffield (created 1786) and also became the 9th Harbord baronet (1746).

He died on 23 June 1945, unmarried, and was succeeded by a distant elderly cousin, Geoffrey Harbord (1861–1946), son of the Hon. William Harbord, third son of Edward Harbord, 3rd Baron Suffield (1781–1835).

== Arms ==
Coat of arms of John Harbord, 8th Baron Suffield
Crest On a Chapeau Gules turned up Ermine a Lion couchant Argent Escutcheon Quarterly: 1st and 4th, quarterly Azure and Gules four Lions rampant Argent and in the centre an Imperial Crown Or (Harbord); 2nd and 3rd, Argent a Fleur-de-lis Gules (Morden) Supporters Dexter: a Lion Or charged on the shoulder with a Fleur-de-lis Gules and gorged with a Crown Flory Chain reflexed over the back Azure; Sinister: a Leopard guardant proper gorged with a similar Coronet and Chain Or Motto Aequanimiter (Even minded)

Peerage of Great Britain
Preceded by Victor Harbord	Baron Suffield; 1943–1945	Succeeded by Geoffrey Harbord
