= Horstead with Stanninghall =

Civil parish in Norfolk, England

Coordinates: 52.728911°N 1.345482°E

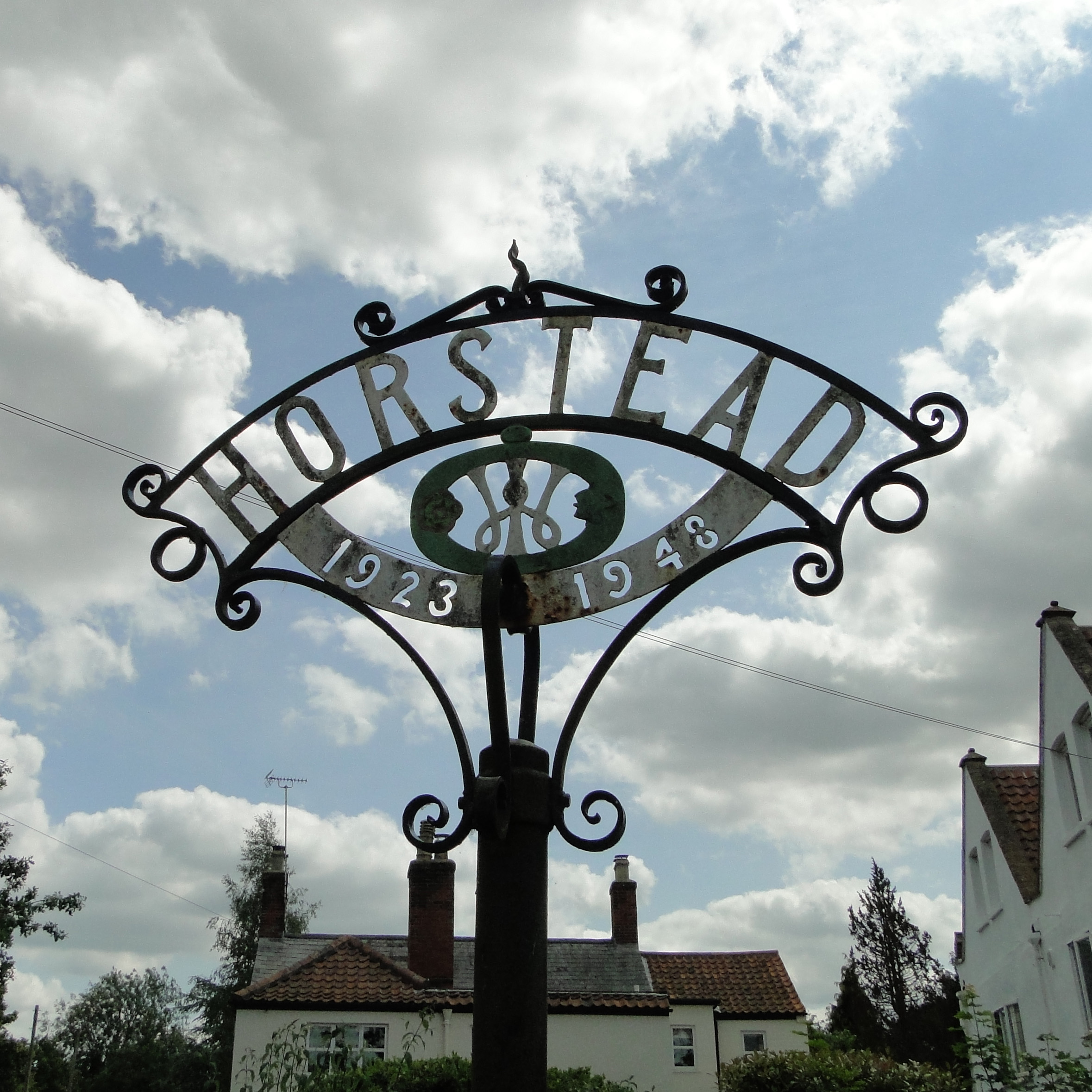
- Horstead Village Sign

- Location within Norfolk
- Area: 2.24 sq mi (5.8 km^{2})
- Population: 977 (2021 census)
  - Density: 436/sq mi (168/km^{2})
- OS grid reference: TG259198
- Civil parish: Horstead with Stanninghall
- District: Broadland
- Shire county: Norfolk
- Region: East
- Country: England
- Sovereign state: United Kingdom
- Post town: NORWICH
- Postcode district: NR12
- Dialling code: 01603
- UK Parliament: Broadland and Fakenham

Horstead with Stanninghall is a civil parish in the English county of Norfolk which consists of the villages of Horstead and Stanninghall as well as Largate and Heggatt.

Horstead with Stanninghall is located 2.6 miles (4.2 km) north-west of Wroxham and 7.7 miles (12.4 km) north of Norwich.

== History ==
Horstead's name is of Anglo-Saxon origin and derives from the Old English for horse place whilst Stanninghall's name is also of Anglo-Saxon origin and derives from the Old English for the land of Stan's people.

In the Domesday Book, Horstead is listed as a settlement of 47 households in the hundred of Taverham. In 1086, the village was part of the East Anglian estates of King William I. Whereas, Stanninghall is listed as a settlement of 9 households also in the hundred of Taverham. In 1086, the village was part of the East Anglian estates of King William I.

Horstead Mill was built in the 1700s as a watermill on the River Bure. The mill was the last to operate on the River Bure and was supposedly one of the most photographed watermills in England. The mill was destroyed by a fire in 1963.

In 1835, Horstead Hall was built in the parish and was originally the residence of Edward Harbord, Baron Suffield. During the Second World War, the base was used for cipher operations.

In the 20th century, a tuberculosis sanatorium was built in Stanninghall.

On 22 November 1944, a De Havilland Mosquito of No. 68 Squadron RAF crashed in Horstead whilst on a patrol from RAF Coltishall after clipping some trees. The only two casualties were the two American crewmen: Lieutenant Samuel W. Peebles and Ensign Eric R. Grinndal.

Meyton Bridge in Horstead is the site of reported haunting on 19 May every year by a ghostly carriage said to be driven by Sir Thomas Boleyn on the evening of his daughter, Anne Boleyn's, execution.

== Geography ==
According to the 2021 census, Horstead and Stanninghall has a population of 977 people, a decrease from the 1,184 people recorded in the 2011 census.

== All Saints' Church ==
Horstead's church dates from the 14th century. All Saints is located on Rectory Road and has been Grade II listed since 1984. It is no longer open for Sunday service.

All Saints was restored in 1879 by Richard Phipson but retains several 17th century memorials and a set of royal arms from the reign of Queen Anne.

== Governance ==
Horstead with Stanninghall is part of the electoral ward of Coltishall for local elections and is part of the district of Broadland.

The village is in the constituency of Broadland and Fakenham which has been represented by Jerome Mayhew of the Conservative Party since 2019.

== War Memorial ==
Horstead & Stanninghall War Memorial is large Latin cross at the junction of Mill Road and Norwich Road. The memorial was completed in October 1921 and unveiled in November by John Willink, Dean of Norwich and Michael Falcon, MP for East Norfolk. The following names are listed for the First World War:

Rank	Name	Unit	Date of death	Burial/Commemoration
Capt.	Drury F. P. Wormald	Royal Garrison Artillery	4 Nov. 1918	All Saints' Churchyard
Sgt.	Arthur J. Bishop	7th Bn., Lancashire Fusiliers	25 Mar. 1918	Arras Memorial
Cpl.	Harry P. Norgate	4th Bn., Norfolk Regiment	19 Apr. 1917	Jerusalem Memorial
Dvr.	Horace Drake	MT Coy., Army Service Corps	21 Apr. 1917	Villers Station Cemetery
Pte.	Charles A. Earl	8th Bn., Bedfordshire Regiment	14 Oct. 1916	Thiepval Memorial
Pte.	Jack Foulger	1st Bn., Black Watch	13 Oct. 1915	Loos Memorial
Pte.	Arthur L. M. Hilder	78th (Winnipeg) Bn., CEF	27 Mar. 1918	Aix-Noulette Cemetery
Pte.	Ernest G. Cushion	11th Bn., Royal Fusiliers	18 Feb. 1917	Varennes Military Cemetery
Pte.	George E. Drake	19th Royal Hussars	25 Nov. 1917	Anneux British Cemetery
Pte.	John Norgate	1st Bn., Norfolk Regiment	4 Sep. 1916	Delville Wood Cemetery
Pte.	George E. Worme	1st Bn., Norfolk Regt.	27 Jul. 1916	Serre Road Cemetery 2
Pte.	Hugh Barber	4th Bn., Norfolk Regt.	8 Jan. 1919	Beirut War Cemetery
Pte.	William Cushion	7th Bn., Norfolk Regt.	13 Oct. 1915	Loos Memorial
Pte.	Henry J. Holmes	4th Bn., Northumberland Fusiliers	24 Apr. 1917	Arras Memorial
Pte.	Bertie E. Clarke	8th Bn., Northumberland Fusiliers	27 Sep. 1918	Chapel Corner Cemetery
Rfn.	Frederick J. Theobold	28th (Artists') Bn., London Regt.	27 Sep. 1918	Mœuvres Cemetery

The following names are listed for the Second World War:

Rank	Name	Unit	Date of death	Burial/Commemoration
Pte.	Roy A. Jones	2nd Bn., Royal Norfolk Regiment	5 May 1944	Kohima War Cemetery
-	Lawrence W. Stone	Civilian	19 Aug. 1940	Unknown
