= Gunton Park Lake =

UK Site of Special Scientific Area

Coordinates: 52.862°N 1.296°E

- Site of Special Scientific Interest
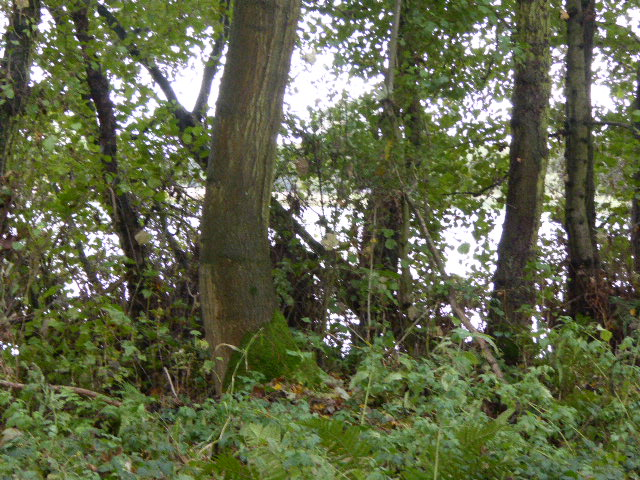
- Location of Gunton Park Lake.
- Area of search: Norfolk
- Grid reference: TG 220 345
- Interest: Biological
- Area: 18.3 hectares (45 acres)
- Notification date: 1986
- Location map: Magic Map

Gunton Park Lake is a 18.3-hectare (45-acre) biological Site of Special Scientific Interest by Gunton Hall, north-west of North Walsham in Norfolk, England. It was formed by damming Hagon Beck.

This artificial lake has the largest flock of post-breeding gadwall in Britain, and more than 500 birds have sometimes been recorded in September. Wintering wildfowl include teal, mallard, shoveler, shelduck and goosander.

The site is private land with no public access.
