= Richard Morden Harbord-Hamond, 10th Baron Suffield =

Royal Navy Admiral (1865–1951)

Admiral Richard Morden Harbord-Hamond, 10th Baron Suffield, DL (24 August 1865 – 2 February 1951) was a British Royal Navy officer and peer.

== Biography ==
Richard Morden Harbord was born in Hanworth, Norfolk, the fourth son of Reverend the Hon. John Harbord, fifth son of Edward Harbord, 3rd Baron Suffield. In 1917 he assumed by Royal Licence the additional surname of Hamond (that of his maternal grandfather, Anthony Hamond).

He entered HMS Britannia in 1879 and saw action during the Anglo-Egyptian War of 1882 as a midshipman on HMS Superb during the bombardment of Alexandria.

During the First World War, he commanded the battleships HMS Mars from 1914 to 1915 and HMS Zealandia from 1915 to 1916. He was Commodore-in-Charge, Portland from 1916 to 1917. He was promoted to rear-admiral on 19 September 1917 and was retired the next day. He was promoted to vice-admiral in 1922 on the retired list and admiral in 1927 on the retired list.

He inherited the family titles from his first cousin Geoffrey Walter Harbord, 9th Baron Suffield in 1946.

He was succeeded in the barony and baronetcy by his son Anthony Harbord-Hamond, 11th Baron Suffield.
