= Baron Suffield =

Barony in the Peerage of Great Britain

Baron Suffield, of Suffield in the County of Norfolk, is a hereditary title in the Peerage of Great Britain.

The barony was created in 1786 for Sir Harbord Harbord, 2nd Baronet, who had previously represented Norwich as Member of Parliament in the House of Commons for thirty years (1756–86).

The Harbord baronetcy, of Suffield in the County of Norfolk, had been created in the Baronetage of Great Britain on 22 March 1746 for his father Sir William Harbord, also a former Member of Parliament and who represented what are now termed the "rotten boroughs" of Bere Alston and Dunwich.

Born William Morden, he assumed the surname of Harbord by an act of Parliament, Morden's Name Act 1741 (15 Geo. 2. c. 18 Pr.) in compliance with the Will of his maternal uncle. The first Baron's eldest son and successor as second Baron, served as Lord Lieutenant of Norfolk (1808–21). His younger brother, the third Baron, represented Yarmouth and Shaftesbury as a Whig MP in the House of Commons and after succeeding to the title in 1821, became a Liberal pioneer and leading advocate for the abolition of slavery in the House of Lords.

His younger son, the fifth Baron (who succeeded his half-brother), served in 1886 as Master of the Buckhounds in William Gladstone's third administration, being sworn of the Privy Council the same year, and was appointed KCB (1876) and GCVO (1901). His eldest son, the sixth Baron, was Captain of the Yeomen of the Guard (Deputy Chief Whip in the House of Lords) from 1915 to 1918. On the death of his younger son, the eighth Baron, the line of the fifth Baron expired. The title was inherited by the late Baron's first cousin once removed, who succeeded as the ninth Baron; he was the third son of the Hon. William Harbord, a captain in the British Army, and fourth son of the third Baron. He was succeeded in 1946 by his first cousin as the tenth Baron; he was the son of Reverend the Hon. John Harbord, fifth son of the third Baron. He served as an admiral in the Royal Navy during World War I and was also a Deputy Lieutenant for Norfolk. In 1917 he assumed by Royal Licence the additional surname of Hamond (that of his maternal grandfather, Anthony Hamond). The eleventh Baron served in the British Army during World War II being awarded the Military Cross in 1950, among other decorations. As of 2017 the titles are held by the latter's second son, the thirteenth Baron, who succeeded his brother in 2016.

== Harbord baronets, of Suffield (1746) ==
- Sir William Harbord, 1st Baronet (c. 1697–1770)
- Sir Harbord Harbord, 2nd Baronet (1734–1810) (created Baron Suffield in 1786)

== Barons Suffield (1786) ==
Baron Suffield
- Crest: On a Chapeau Gules turned up Ermine a Lion couchant Argent
- Shield: Quarterly: 1st and 4th, quarterly Azure and Gules four Lions rampant Argent and in the centre an Imperial Crown Or (Harbord); 2nd and 3rd, Argent a Fleur-de-lis Gules (Morden)
- Supporters: Dexter: a Lion Or charged on the shoulder with a Fleur-de-lis Gules and gorged with a Crown Flory Chain reflexed over the back Azure; Sinister: a Leopard guardant proper gorged with a similar Coronet and Chain Or
- Motto: Aequanimiter (Even minded)

- Harbord Harbord, 1st Baron Suffield (1734–1810)
- William Assheton Harbord, 2nd Baron Suffield (1766–1821)
- Edward Harbord, 3rd Baron Suffield (1781–1835)
- Edward Vernon Harbord, 4th Baron Suffield (1813–1853)
- Charles Harbord, 5th Baron Suffield (1830–1914)
- Charles Harbord, 6th Baron Suffield (1855–1924)
- Victor Alexander Charles Harbord, 7th Baron Suffield (1897–1943)
- John Harbord, 8th Baron Suffield (1907–1945)
- Geoffrey Walter Harbord, 9th Baron Suffield (1861–1946)
- Richard Morden Harbord-Hamond, 10th Baron Suffield (1865–1951)
- Anthony Philip Harbord-Hamond, 11th Baron Suffield (1922–2011)
- Charles Anthony Assheton Harbord-Hamond, 12th Baron Suffield (1953–2016)
- John Edward Richard Harbord-Hamond, 13th Baron Suffield (b. 1956)

The heir apparent is the current holder's eldest son the Hon. Samuel Charles Anthony Harbord-Hamond (b. 1989)

== Notes ==
Baronetage of Great Britain
Preceded by Grey baronets	Harbord baronets of Suffield; 22 March 1746	Succeeded by Danvers baronets
