= Thomas Jervis (judge) =

British judge and politician (1770–1838)

Thomas Jervis (1770–1838) was an English judge, the last Puisne Justice of Chester until the abolition of the office in 1830. He was also member of parliament for Great Yarmouth. With Mary Ann née Dixon Old Swinford, Worcestershire, he had three sons and a daughter. The family name was from a noble ancestor Gervasius de Stanton. His youngest son was Attorney General for England and Wales, Sir John Jervis.

He appeared for the prosecution in the 1812 trial of William Booth for forgery. Booth was sentenced to hang.

== Bibliography ==
- Getzler, J. S. (2004) "Jervis, Sir John (1802–1856)", Oxford Dictionary of National Biography, Oxford University Press, , accessed 4 July 2007
- Leigh Rayment's Peerage Pages

Parliament of Great Britain
Preceded by William Loftus; Henry Jodrell	Member of Parliament for Great Yarmouth; 1802–1806; With: Sir Thomas Troubridge	Succeeded by Edward Harbord; Stephen Lushington
