= Hagon Beck =

River in Norfolk, England

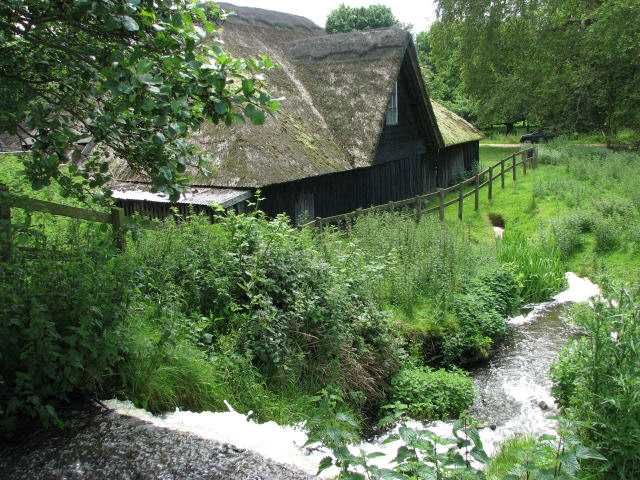
- Hagon Beck and Gunton Park Sawmill

- Location of the river mouth within Norfolk

Location
- Country: England
- State: Norfolk
- Region: East of England
- District: North Norfolk

Physical characteristics
- Source
  - location: North of the Village of Roughton, East of England, England
  - elevation: 148 ft (45 m)
- Mouth: Feeds into Great Lake in Gunton Park
  - coordinates: 52°51′48.5″N 1°17′55.8″E
- Length: 3.2 mi (5.1 km)
- watermills Gunton Watermill; Gunton Park Sawmill

Hagon Beck is a minor watercourse. The beck rises in the north of the English county of Norfolk. It falls into Great Lake in Gunton Park, which in turn feeds Suffield Beck. Suffield Beck is a tributary of Blackwater Beck which in turn joins the River Bure. Its spring is a little north of the North Norfolk village of Roughton. There were two watermills on the beck. The first was located at Gunton, and the second is a sawmill in Suffield Park.

== Gunton Watermill ==
The Domesday Book of 1068 records a watermill on Hagon Beck at Gunton that continued working right through the medieval period. The estate on which the mill stood was sold in 1676, and by then the mill had ceased to work, although a map that was provided in the sale particulars showed that the millpond still remained. The millpond was still shown on the Ordnance Survey map of 1838, although, by the time this map was published, Hagon Beck had been dammed to form the lake known as Great Water to the north of the mill. It is likely that it was the damming of the beck that caused the demise of Gunton Watermill. Great Water was created to feed Gunton Park Sawmill.

== Gunton Park Sawmill ==
Gunton Park Sawmill was built as a sawmill in 1824 to provide sawn timber for the 12,000-acre (4,900 ha) Gunton Hall Estate. It is the only surviving water powered sawmill in Norfolk. It was constructed as a simple timber-framed building open on three sides. It has a hipped thatched roof of the local Norfolk reed. Hagon Beck fed the lake, and the mill was set below the water level which provided the power to drive two identical 12-foot-diameter (3.7 m), 5-foot-wide (1.5 m) breastshot wheels via a guillotine gate. One wheel powered the main 6-foot-6-inch (1.98 m) flywheel-driven reciprocating saw, and the other was set to drive a circular saw and ancillary equipment, including a small corn mill that was also included at the mill site. The outflow from the sawmill then became Hagon Beck once more, eventually rejoining the original watercourse. It is maintained by the Norfolk Windmills Trust.
