= William Harbord, 2nd Baron Suffield =

Colonel William Assheton Harbord, 2nd Baron Suffield (21 August 1766 – 1 August 1821), was a Member of Parliament for Ludgershall (1790–1796) and Plympton Erle (7 February 1807 – 4 February 1810). He was colonel of a fencible cavalry regiment, the Norfolk Fencible Light Dragoons (1794), the Blickling Rifle Volunteers (1803), and East Norfolk Regiment of Militia (1808). He was an English amateur cricketer.

== Biography ==
He was mainly associated with Marylebone Cricket Club (MCC). Harbord made three known appearances in important matches during the 1791 season.

He succeeded his father, Harbord Harbord, 1st Baron Suffield, as Baron Suffield in February 1810. He married Lady Caroline Hobart, daughter of John Hobart, 2nd Earl of Buckinghamshire, but had no children. On his death, his title passed to his brother Edward.

He played an intermittent role in politics, being regarded as a strong if not vocal supporter of William Pitt the Younger and later of Spencer Perceval. Although he had a strong family link with Castlereagh, who had married Caroline's sister Lady Amelia Hobart, the two men were not close politically. He opposed the abolition of the slave trade in 1807.

== Arms ==
Coat of arms of William Harbord, 2nd Baron Suffield
Crest On a Chapeau Gules turned up Ermine a Lion couchant Argent Escutcheon Quarterly: 1st and 4th, quarterly Azure and Gules four Lions rampant Argent and in the centre an Imperial Crown Or (Harbord); 2nd and 3rd, Argent a Fleur-de-lis Gules (Morden) Supporters Dexter: a Lion Or charged on the shoulder with a Fleur-de-lis Gules and gorged with a Crown Flory Chain reflexed over the back Azure; Sinister: a Leopard guardant proper gorged with a similar Coronet and Chain Or Motto Aequanimiter (Even minded)

== Notes ==
Parliament of Great Britain
Preceded by George Augustus Selwyn; Nathaniel Wraxall	Member of Parliament for Ludgershall; 1790–1796; With: George Augustus Selwyn to 1791; Samuel Smith 1791–1793; Nathaniel Newnham 1793–1796	Succeeded by Earl of Dalkeith; Thomas Everett
Parliament of the United Kingdom
Preceded by Viscount Castlereagh; Sir Stephen Lushington	Member of Parliament for Plympton Erle; 1807–1810; With: Viscount Castlereagh	Succeeded by Viscount Castlereagh; Henry Drummond
Honorary titles
Preceded by The Marquess Townshend	Lord Lieutenant of Norfolk; 1807–1821	Succeeded by Hon. John Wodehouse
Vacant Title last held by The Marquess Townshend	Vice-Admiral of Norfolk; 1809–1821	Succeeded by Hon. John Wodehouse
Peerage of Great Britain
Preceded by Harbord Harbord	Baron Suffield; 1810–1821	Succeeded by Edward Harbord
