= Anthony Harbord-Hamond, 11th Baron Suffield =

British politician and soldier

Tony Harbord-Hamond

Anthony Philip Harbord-Hamond, 11th Baron Suffield, MC (19 June 1922 – 8 December 2011), was a British peer, soldier and politician of the Conservative Party.

== Life and career ==
Tony Harbord-Hamond was born in London, a son of Admiral Richard Harbord, 10th Baron Suffield (1865–1951), and Nina Crawfuird Hutchinson. His father married at the age of 47; he was 57 years old when his son was born.

Anthony Harbord-Hamond attended Eton College. He joined the Army in 1942 as an officer in the Coldstream Guards, serving in the Second World War in North African and Italy. He would remain in the army for more than 20 years. He received a Military Cross for his actions during the rebellion in Malaya in 1950, the same year he was also decorated as an Officer of the Dutch Order of Orange-Nassau. Subsequently, he served in England and Germany. He retired from active duty in 1961 or 1964, according to other sources.

From 1973 to 1992, he was member of the Honourable Corps of Gentlemen-at-Arms, the Queen's Bodyguard. In 1977, he became president of the Norfolk County Cricket Club.

He worked as a farmer in Binham. He is also known as an artist, particularly for watercolours of landscapes and country houses in Norfolk. The exhibition of 1989 in London was a big success.

== Membership of the House of Lords ==
Upon the death of his father in February 1951, he inherited his title Baron Suffield and his seat in the House of Lords where he represented the Conservative Party. His maiden speech was on 19 November 1963 an Address In Reply To Her Majesty's Most Gracious Speech.

He made irregular contributions. In 1965 he spoke about the Army. In 1984 he made two contributions to the Health and Social Security Bill. In 1986 he gave a speech on the Building Societies Bill. In 1989 he commented twice on the potential registration of dogs. In 1993 he wrote a reply. His last speech was in January 1995.

He lost his seat by the introduction of the House of Lords Act 1999.

== Marriage and children ==
Suffield was married on 16 January 1952 to Elizabeth Eve Edgedale. They had four children; three sons and one daughter:

- Charles Anthony Assheton Harbord-Hamond, 12th Baron Suffield (born 3 December 1953, died 15 January 2016)
- John Edward Richard Harbord-Hamond, 13th Baron Suffield (born 10 July 1956)
- Hon Caroline Mary Elaine Harbord-Hamond (born 15 December 1960)
- Hon Robert Philip Morden Harbord-Hamond (born 10 March 1964)

Suffield died on 8 December 2011 at the age of 89 years. He was succeeded in the barony and baronetcy by his eldest son, Charles. A family dispute arose after his death.

== Arms ==
Coat of arms of Anthony Harbord-Hamond, 11th Baron Suffield
Crest On a Chapeau Gules turned up Ermine a Lion couchant Argent Escutcheon Quarterly: 1st and 4th, quarterly Azure and Gules four Lions rampant Argent and in the centre an Imperial Crown Or (Harbord); 2nd and 3rd, Argent a Fleur-de-lis Gules (Morden) Supporters Dexter: a Lion Or charged on the shoulder with a Fleur-de-lis Gules and gorged with a Crown Flory Chain reflexed over the back Azure; Sinister: a Leopard guardant proper gorged with a similar Coronet and Chain Or Motto Aequanimiter (Even minded)

Peerage of Great Britain
Preceded by Richard Harbord-Hamond	Baron Suffield; 1951–2011	Succeeded by Charles Harbord-Hamond
