= Giffin Wilson =

Sir Giffin Wilson (1766 – 4 August 1848) was an English barrister, judge and politician.

He was the eldest son of Edward Wilson, rector of Binfield, Berkshire and tutor of William Pitt the Younger, and entered Lincoln's Inn in 1782, was called to the bar in 1789, and became a commissioner of bankrupts in 1793. He was elected a Fellow of the Royal Society in 1801. He succeeded his father in 1804.

Wilson became in 1808 a Member of Parliament for Great Yarmouth as a government supporter. He was defeated there in 1812, his patron Harbord Harbord, 1st Baron Suffield having died. He later become vice-chancellor of the County Palatine of Lancaster, and then vice-chancellor of Chester. He continued his career as a Master in Chancery and was knighted in 1823.

Wilson died on 4 August 1848. He had married twice; firstly Ann, the daughter and heiress of Peter Crachet Jouvençal of Clapham, Surrey and secondly Harriet, the daughter of General George Hotham, with whom he had a daughter who predeceased him.
