= Edward Harbord, 3rd Baron Suffield =

British politician and abolitionist (1781–1835)

The Right Honourable The Lord Suffield
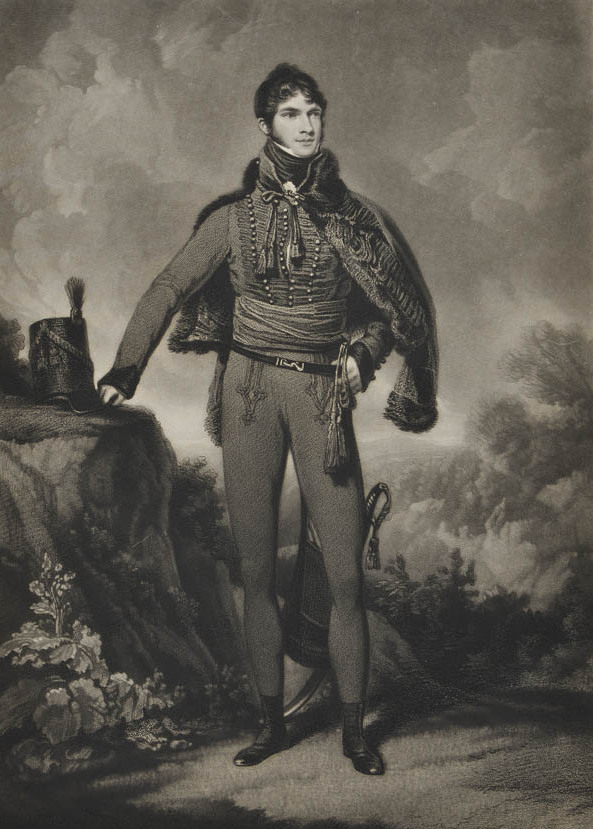

Member of Parliament for Great Yarmouth
- In office 1806–1812
- Preceded by: Sir Thomas Troubridge; Thomas Jervis
- Succeeded by: Edmund Knowles Lacon; William Loftus

Member of Parliament for Shaftesbury
- In office 1820–1821
- Preceded by: John Bacon Sawrey Morritt; Henry John Shepherd
- Succeeded by: Abraham Moore; Ralph Leycester

Personal details
- Born: 10 November 1781 England
- Died: 6 July 1835 (aged 53) St James's, London
- Spouse(s): Georgiana née Vernon (m. 1809); Emily née Shirley (m. 1826)
- Children: 9, including Edward and Charles
- Parent(s): Harbord Harbord, 1st Baron Suffield; Mary née Assheton
- Education: Eton College
- Occupation: Politician

Edward Harbord, 3rd Baron Suffield (10 November 1781 – 6 July 1835), was a British politician and abolitionist.

== Life ==
Harbord was the second son of Sir Harbord Harbord, 1st Baron Suffield (a conservative Whig politician who had been raised to the peerage by William Pitt the Younger in 1786), and Mary Assheton, daughter and co-heiress of Sir Ralph Assheton, 3rd Baronet. William Harbord, 2nd Baron Suffield, was his elder brother.

He went to Eton in 1791 aged 10, lodging in his own private house with a manservant, and was placed “under the care of a private tutor, the Revd Mr Evans, a Whig in politics, from whom he was accustomed to saying he derived his liberal opinions which guided his mature life, though they were long dormant, or kept down by the opposing sentiments of his family and immediate connections”.

From Eton he went up to Christ Church, Oxford, taking his MA in 1802 after an interruption of six months touring northern Europe including Russia but avoiding France, before his father bought him chambers at 4 Stone Buildings, Lincoln's Inn with a view to him reading for the Bar. To his later regret, he never pursued this. As ever, London offered too many distractions including friends such as Tom Brinsley Sheridan, the son of Richard Brinsley Sheridan, the MP playwright and owner of the Theatre Royal, Drury Lane.

He was returned to Parliament for Great Yarmouth in 1806, a seat he held until 1812.

On the outbreak of the Peninsular War in 1808, Harbord joined the army and sailed to Portugal in a staff role to report back progress to the War Minister Lord Castlereagh (his brother's brother-in-law) who subsequently invited him to become his private secretary, an offer that was lost due to delays.

In 1819 he outraged his family by declaring himself an "Independent" at a public County Meeting held at Norwich to petition for an inquiry into the Peterloo massacre. He was appalled by the gross mishandling of the large public demonstration which had been attended by many of the tenants of his Middleton estate, just north of Manchester. A crowd of 60,000 had gathered in Manchester calling for political reform and it had been dispersed by cavalry on the instructions of local magistrates, killing 18 people. Harbord personally investigated the events and concluded that the magistrates had panicked. He was no less appalled by the government's inept reaction afterwards, which included steps to prevent further public meetings calling for political reform, via the so-called Six Acts. He said, "I hold myself distinct from Whig and Tory – I hold myself independent". His elder brother William was mortified by Harbord's stance as it countered the family's political allies. William had acquired the Blickling estate in Norfolk (with 8,000 acres) through his marriage to Lady Caroline Hobart (daughter and co-heir to John Hobart, 2nd Earl of Buckinghamshire) but they had no descendants. William now changed his will so that instead of Blickling being bequeathed to Edward, it would revert to Lady Caroline's Hobart family - i.e. effectively disinheriting Harbord from Blickling as a result of his political stance.

In 1820 he returned to the House of Commons as one of two representatives for Shaftesbury having been offered the support for the seat by Robert, 2nd Earl Grosvenor who completely endorsed what Harbord had said at the Norfolk County Meeting and embraced Harbord as a "brother reformer".

In August 1821 he succeeded his elder brother in the barony and inherited the Gunton estate in north Norfolk, close to Cromer. He immediately reduced his tenants’ rents and let them vote as they wished. He became an active Chairman of the Quarter Sessions and built a school. But he resigned the command of the local Norfolk Militia to avoid ever facing the dilemma of the Yeomanry at Peterloo.

He was active in the House of Lords for the Whigs, especially in advocating the abolition of slavery.

Lord Suffield (as he now was) first met Thomas Fowell Buxton in 1818 (when Suffield showed interest in Buxton's seminal book on prison reform, following which they both sat on a House of Commons committee and helped enact a bill on prison reform) but they became closer acquainted when Buxton moved to live at nearby Cromer Hall in 1820. In the autumn of 1822 William Wilberforce, Zachary Macaulay, Dr Stephen Lushington and Suffield met Buxton at Cromer Hall and persuaded him to take over the leadership of the campaign to abolish slavery.

He chaired the general meeting of the Anti-Slavery Society in the new Exeter Hall in the Strand, London on 23 April 1831 before some 3,000 people. He began as chairman also at the 12th May 1832 meeting before handing over the chair to James Stephen, and then also chaired the 2nd April 1833 meeting.

A House of Lords Committee was appointed in 1832 which sat from 13 May to 9 August to inquire into the 'true' nature of slavery. Of the 25 members of the committee, 10 had slave-holding interests and Suffield was the only avowed abolitionist. Suffield and Buxton were surprised at the need for such a committee as more than enough evidence of the iniquities of slavery already existed. But the exercise proved fruitful. Even the Earl of Harewood, who had led the call to set up the committee in the first place, became more supportive after he discovered how the manager of his own estate was mistreating slaves, and sacked the manager.

In July 1833, Suffield took the Slavery Abolition Bill through the House of Lords. Buxton, Lushington and others watched Suffield in admiration as he led the motion for the Bill. As Buxton described,

“When the Bill itself reached the Upper House in July 1833 his task was of the most difficult and laborious kind. Dr Lushington and I and some others used to go and spend hour after hour at the bar of the House of Lords watching our friend in his arduous conflict; and I find that scarcely any one of the many memorable scenes and incidents of that session has made so strong an impression upon some members of my family as witnessing from the gallery Lord Suffield's unsupported but determined struggle over each clause of the bill as it passed through the Committee of the whole House. But his voice, single as it often was, could not but be listened to considering that he had for many weeks before that time been in the habit of presenting fifty petitions per day in favour of abolition; and that latterly finding his stores still accumulating, he had increased the number to one hundred, and afterwards to two hundred per day; nor should it be forgotten that one only of these petitions was signed by above 17,000 names, and that many others could boast their thousands and tens of thousands of signatures. In point of fact, the struggle he maintained was of essential importance in preventing the bill from being further injured than it was. I remember on one occasion a proposition was made that the flogging of females should be at once abolished but even this was supported but by the Duke of Cumberland and himself."

When the Slavery Abolition Act was passed, the abolitionists repaired to the Crown and Anchor tavern in the Strand to celebrate. Lord Suffield chaired the proceedings. Despite Thomas Buxton promising to the Quaker attendees that there would be no frivolities such as alcohol, music or even toasts, the organiser George Stephen managed to thwart this comprehensively and "...The Quakers were utterly discomfited."

In addition to the anti-slavery campaign, he fought many other liberal issues.

Having earlier taken an interest in the failings of Norwich Gaol, and proposing reforms, in 1816 he co-founded the Society for the Improvement of Prison Discipline with Elizabeth Fry, Thomas Buxton and Dr Stephen Lushington.

He also campaigned to improve the laws on vagrancy and the sale of bread; and to ban capital punishment and corporal punishment in prisons.

He supported the case for Queen Caroline when the King, George IV, sought to divorce her via the Pains and Penalties Bill 1820.

While strongly opposed to radical calls for revolution, he argued forcibly for constitutional reform: “…A foreigner would say…that the people elect their representatives. [But do] they do so?...[when] out of 8 millions of inhabitants, the majority was chosen by 8,000….” (An exaggeration as the population was actually 14.4 million and there were 400,000 (men) electors (raised to 650,000 after the 1832 Great Reform Act)).

As a result of this speech, John Buckley and other reformers of Middleton he had met after Peterloo wrote to him in a letter dated 11 February 1822, praising his “excellent speech…In stating the theory and exposing the practice of the Constitution, in insisting upon the necessity of a Reformed Parliament, and in your open declaration that at Manchester [i.e. Peterloo], “the people's throats were cut;” your Lordship spoke the language of truth and spoke it well, and we cannot but be persuaded that if your manly example were tenaciously followed upon public occasions by those who ought to be the guardians of the people's rights, an irresistible impression would soon be made upon that mass of corruption, the House of Commons," also,"We thank your Lordship for coming amongst us, as well as for the offers of service which you condescendingly tendered and should your visit be repeated it shall not be our fault if an understanding does not take place, which may be gratifying to your Lordship, and honourable and beneficial to ourselves. Unfortunately when you were down here, your Lordship's political character was not sufficiently known to be fully appreciated; indeed we had been so accustomed to experience abuse and treachery from those, who in these parts assume the title of “Gentlemen” that we were not prepared to render justice to any stranger who appeared in that character; now, however, that your Lordship's professions have been backed by correspondent actions, we feel that you are worthy of every confidence, and if we have not by our apathy forfeited yours, we will henceforth upon every fitting occasion, avail ourselves of your Lordship's influence and ability."

He opposed Bishops sitting in the House of Lords.

He disagreed with Roman Catholic tenets and customs but was in favour of Catholic emancipation and supported the Duke of Wellington over the issue when most of the Duke's own Tory supporters did not.

He helped reform the game laws – it was illegal to sell game unless you were lord of the manor, yet everyone was doing it, even Magistrates – and his paper on the subject (Considerations on The Game Laws by Edward, Lord Suffield 1825 ) drew approbation in 1826 from the influential, Whig supporting, Edinburgh Review “This is perhaps the ablest, certainly the most useful thing beyond all comparison, that has been published upon the important question of the Game Laws.”

He also drove through a change in the law to banish spring guns, used to trap poachers. Poachers were invariably the only people who knew how to avoid them. His Bill to ban spring guns became law in 1827, a signal personal success.

He was a generous philanthropist. His approach to personal philanthropy as much as social reform, was simple: ‘Help people to help themselves’. “If you can shew me any way in which the man can be placed in a condition to earn his future subsistence, I will give him £20; if it be merely to afford him momentary relief, I will not give him as many pence, for such gifts do no good.” Why not give a man ...”half an acre – labourers to dig out the land for themselves, the parish to dig the land and seed it, the parish to find a pig costing from eight to ten shillings, to be repaid when the crop is sold?” Sadly no one else was interested. He helped agricultural workers who could find no work to emigrate. In 1834 he sponsored the immigration of a group of his farmworkers to Canada, and Harbord Village in Toronto is thought to be named after him in consequence.

He supported Sir William Hilary's ‘National Association’ (The National Institution for the Preservation of Lives and Property from Shipwreck, forerunner of the RNLI [Royal National Lifeboat Institution]), which was founded on 4 March 1824 at London Tavern, Bishopsgate, as evidenced in a letter dated 18 February 1824 to the Editor of the Norwich Mercury.

He established the Norfolk County Cricket Club in 1833 and was its first President. Two of his sons would later become President of M.C.C (Marylebone Cricket Club): Edward Vernon Harbord, 4th Baron Suffield in 1836 and Charles Harbord, 5th Baron Suffield in 1863.

== Family ==
Lord Suffield married firstly in 1809 Georgiana Vernon, daughter of George Venables-Vernon, 2nd Baron Vernon, in 1809. After Lady Suffield's death in September 1824, Lord Suffield married in 1826 as his second wife Emily Harriet Shirley, daughter of Evelyn Shirley, the grandson of Robert Shirley, 1st Earl Ferrers.

Before he married, Edward Harbord had three illegitimate children, all given the surname Lambton, by a lady called Mary Ann Goodwin; Caroline (1806–1864) who married James Russell of Aden, Aberdeenshire; Sophia (1808–1810); and Stephen (1809–1851) who emigrated to Australia. Mary Ann Goodwin later married George Forbes Leith.

Lord Suffield died at his London home, Vernon House, Park Place, St James's, in July 1835, aged 53, after a fall from his horse on Constitution Hill on 30 June, and was buried at Gunton, Norfolk.

He was succeeded by his elder son from his first marriage, Edward Harbord, 4th Baron Suffield.

Suffield's third son, Charles Harbord, 5th Baron Suffield, was a close friend of Edward VII, he served as a Lord of the Bedchamber and Lord-in-waiting to the King. Another son the Honourable Ralph Harbord, married Elizabeth Pole Schenley, daughter of Edward Wyndham Harrington Schenley. The hamlet in Suffield, Alberta, Canada – which is also the location of the British Army Training Unit Suffield (BATUS) – is named after him.

== Arms ==
Coat of arms of Edward Harbord, 3rd Baron Suffield
Crest On a Chapeau Gules turned up Ermine a Lion couchant Argent Escutcheon Quarterly: 1st and 4th, quarterly Azure and Gules four Lions rampant Argent and in the centre an Imperial Crown Or (Harbord); 2nd and 3rd, Argent a Fleur-de-lys Gules (Morden) Supporters Dexter: a Lion Or charged on the shoulder with a Fleur-de-lys Gules and gorged with a Crown Flory Chain reflexed over the back Azure; Sinister: a Leopard guardant Proper gorged with a similar Coronet and Chain Or Motto Aequanimiter ("Even minded")

Parliament of the United Kingdom
Preceded by Sir Thomas Troubridge, Bt; Thomas Jervis	Member of Parliament for Great Yarmouth; 1806–1812; With: Stephen Lushington 1806–1808; Giffin Wilson 1808–1812	Succeeded by Edmund Knowles Lacon; William Loftus
Preceded by John Bacon Sawrey Morritt; Henry John Shepherd	Member of Parliament for Shaftesbury; 1820–1821; With: Abraham Moore	Succeeded by Abraham Moore; Ralph Leycester
Peerage of Great Britain
Preceded by William Harbord	Baron Suffield; 1821–1835	Succeeded by Edward Vernon Harbord
