= Gunton Hall =

Country house in Norfolk, England

Coordinates: 52°51′32.0″N 1°18′26.9″E

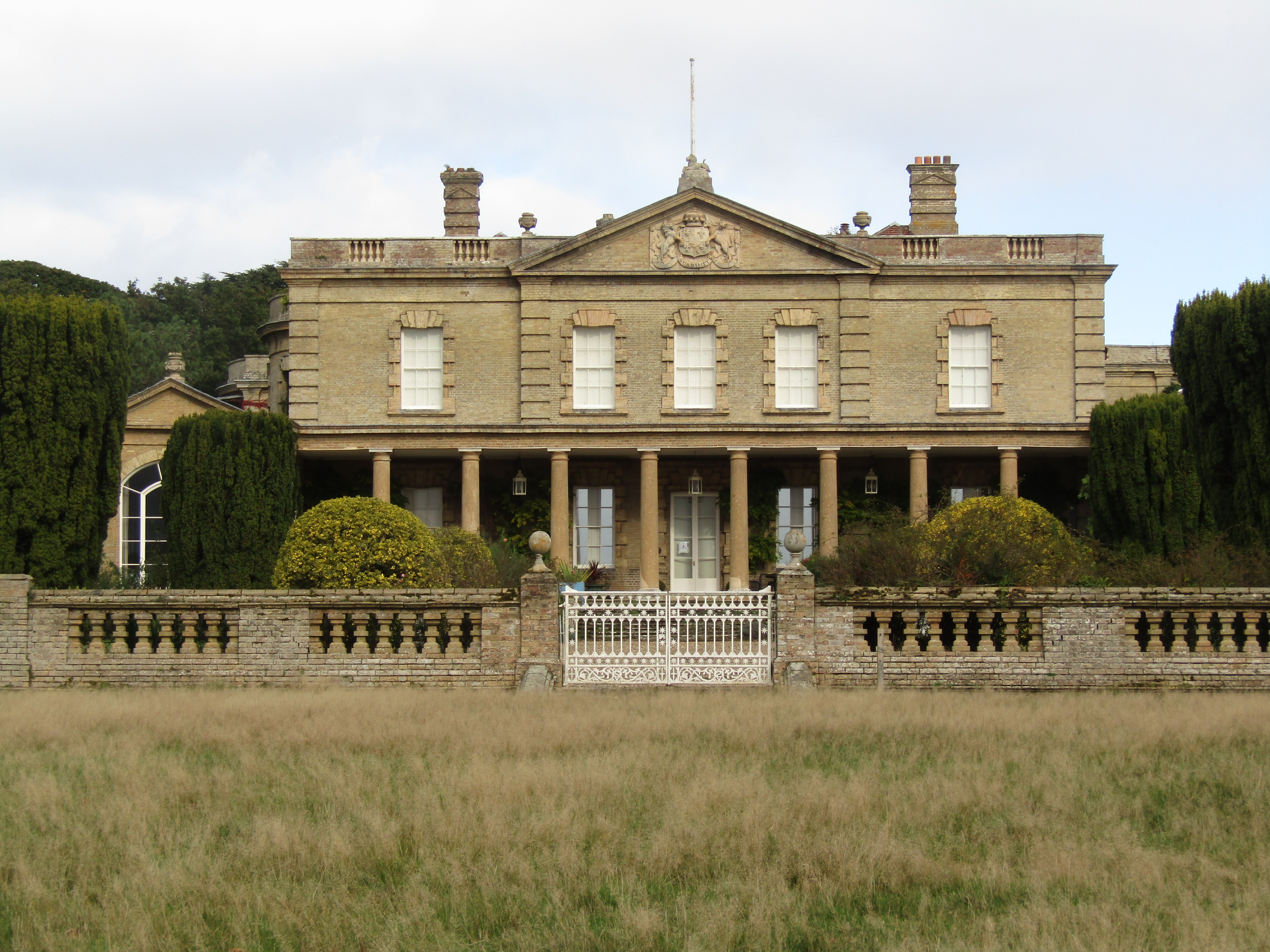
Gunton Hall

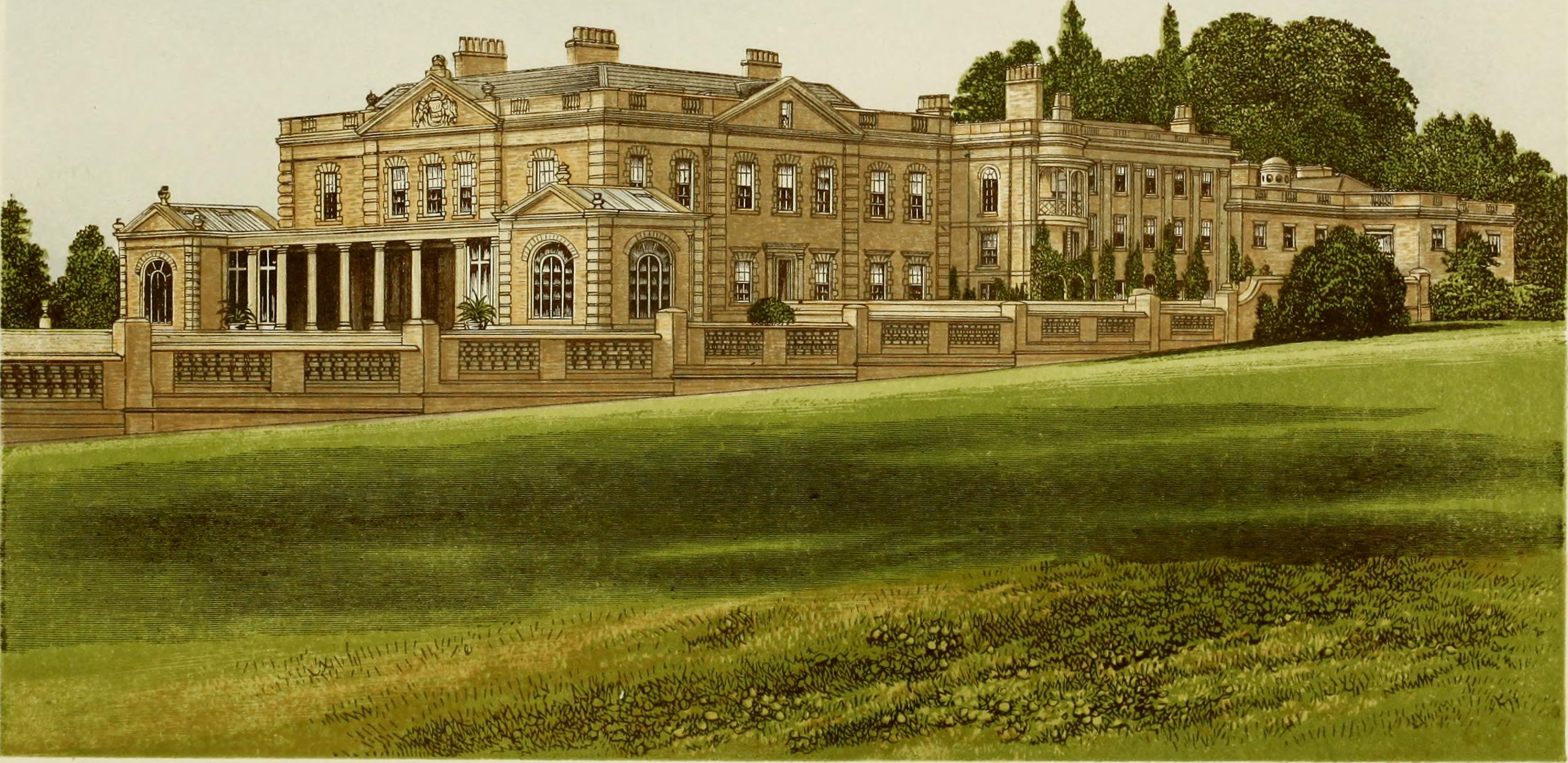
Gunton Hall, 19th-century lithograph

Gunton Hall, Gunton Park, is a large country house near Suffield in Norfolk.

== History ==
The estate belonged to the Gunton family in the 12th century, to the Berney family in the 16th century and later to the Jermyn family. The current house was designed for Sir William Harbord, 1st Baronet in 1745 by the architect Matthew Brettingham, three years after the former house on the site was gutted by fire. The new house of brick had a principal façade like that of Brettingham's Hanworth Hall, however, this larger house was seven bays deep, and had a large service wing on its western side.

In 1775 Harbord Harbord, 1st Baron Suffield, Member of Parliament for Norwich, commissioned James Wyatt to make significant additions to the house. The grounds were developed by Charles Harbord, 5th Baron Suffield, employing William Milford Teulon as the landscaper. However, the hall was almost destroyed by fire in 1882 and lay derelict for nearly a century before Kit Martin, an architect, bought the hall in 1980 and converted it into individual houses. It is surrounded by a 1,000 acre deer park. The boathouse was rebuilt as a studio by the artist Gerard Stamp in 2004.

St Andrew's Church, Gunton in woodland to the east of the hall is a redundant Church of England church. The church was built in 1769 and designed by Robert Adam for Sir William Harbord, to replace a medieval church. It is a Grade I listed building, and is under the care of the Churches Conservation Trust.

Gunton Park sawmill is an 1824 sawmill powered by a mill pond on Hagon Beck.

== See also ==
- Gunton Park Lake SSSI
- Gunton railway station
