= Charles Harbord, 5th Baron Suffield =

British Baron, courtier and Liberal politician

The Right Honourable The Lord Suffield GCVO KCB PC JP DL
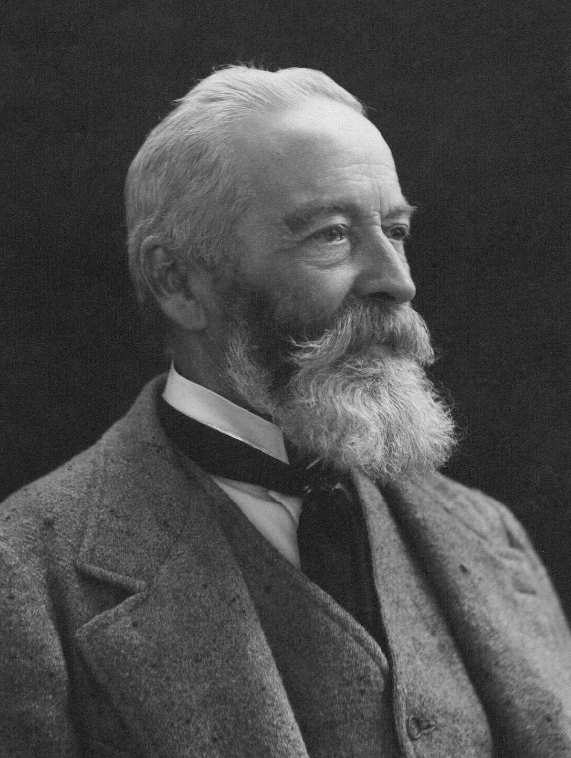

Master of the Buckhounds
- In office 17 February 1886 – 20 July 1886
- Monarch: Queen Victoria
- Prime Minister: William Ewart Gladstone
- Preceded by: The Marquess of Waterford
- Succeeded by: The Earl of Coventry

Personal details
- Born: 2 January 1830
- Died: 9 April 1914 (aged 84)
- Party: Liberal
- Spouse(s): (1) Cecilia Baring (d. 1911) (2) Frances Amelia Jessie Eliot Gabbett
- Children: 11

Charles Harbord, 5th Baron Suffield GCVO KCB PC JP DL (2 January 1830 – 9 April 1914), was a British peer, courtier and Liberal politician. A close friend of Edward VII, he served as a Lord of the Bedchamber and Lord-in-waiting to the King. He also held political office as Master of the Buckhounds under William Gladstone between February and July 1886.

== Background and education ==
Harbord was a son of Edward Harbord, 3rd Baron Suffield. He was educated at King's College School. His father died in 1835 and in 1853, his childless, elder half-brother (his father's successor) died and Harbord inherited the title. He served for a few years as an officer in the 7th Hussars.

== Political career ==
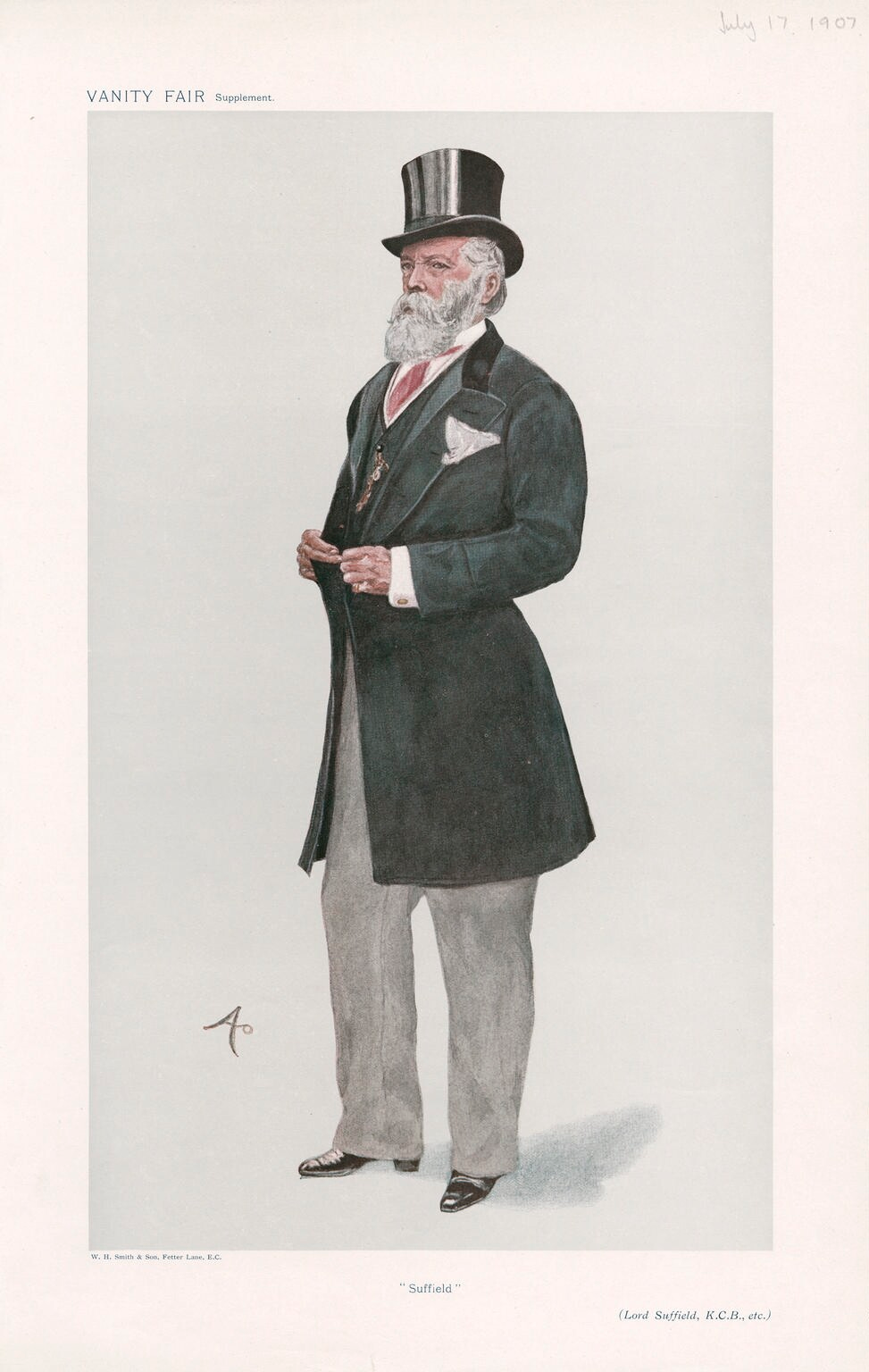
Lord Suffield

Lord Suffield was appointed a Lord-in-waiting in 1868 in William Gladstone's first administration, a post he held until 1872. The latter year he was appointed Lord of the Bedchamber to the Prince of Wales, to whom he was a close friend. He was chief of staff to the Prince of Wales during the Prince's expedition to India in 1875–1876. He did not serve in Gladstone's second administration but was briefly Master of the Buckhounds from February to July 1886 in Gladstone's third administration. He was sworn of the Privy Council in February 1886. He remained Lord of the Bedchamber until 1901, when on the Prince of Wales's accession to the throne, Suffield was made a Lord-in-Waiting-in-Ordinary to the King. He was Master of the Robes at the coronation of Edward VII and Alexandra in 1902.

Harbord served as President of Marylebone Cricket Club (MCC) in 1863, and was the first President of the newly-formed Norfolk County Cricket Club in 1876. On 9 May 1866 he was appointed Lieutenant-Colonel Commandant of the Norfolk Artillery Militia in which two of his younger brothers were already serving. In 1872 the Prince of Wales became the unit's Honorary Colonel and three years later it became the 'Prince of Wales's Own Norfolk Artillery Militia'. It became a socially exclusive unit in which a number of the prince's connections served.

== Family ==
Lord Suffield married firstly Cecilia Annetta Baring, daughter of Henry Baring, on 4 May 1854. They had two sons and nine daughters:

- Charles Harbord, 6th Baron Suffield (14 June 1855 – 10 February 1924).
- Hon. Cecilia Margaret Harbord (15 June 1856 – 6 October 1934), married Charles Wynn-Carington, 1st Marquess of Lincolnshire, and had issue.
- Hon. Alice Marion Harbord (23 June 1857 – 1940), married Charles Mills, 2nd Baron Hillingdon, and had issue.
- Hon. Mabel Harbord (21 November 1858 – 11 February 1860).
- Hon. Elizabeth Evelyn Harbord (23 February 1860 – 19 February 1957), married George Astley, 20th Baron Hastings.
- Assheton Edward Harbord (20 January 1861, Harlestone, Northamptonshire – 18 July 1929) married aeronaut May Constance Blackwood
- Hon. Judith Harbord (12 June 1862, Gunton Park, Norfolk – 4 February 1942).
- Hon. Winifred Harbord (31 December 1864, Gunton, Norfolk – 6 January 1949), married in 1889 Captain Geoffry Carr Glyn.
- Hon. Eleanor Harbord (7 January 1868, Gunton, Norfolk – 12 July 1936), married in 1895 Sir Richard George Musgrave, 12th Baronet.
- Hon. Bridget Louisa Harbord (20 December 1870 – 24 September 1951), married Sir Derek Keppel.

Lady Suffield died in 1911. Lord Suffield married secondly, aged 81, Frances Amelia Jessie Eliot Gabbett, daughter of Major Robert Pool Gabbett, in August 1911. Lord Suffield was also President of the Royal Cromer golf club in 1887 (in fact Suffield was the landlord of the golf club' land). His son and grandsons were also members of the club and land owners. A substantial landowner, he owned 12,000 acres and had seats at Gunton Park, Norwich, and Harbord House, Cromer. His London residence was at 129 St George's Road. Lord Suffield died in April 1914, aged 84, and was succeeded by his eldest son, Charles.

== Honours and arms ==
- 17 February 1886 : Appointed to the Privy Council of the United Kingdom by Queen Victoria
- 17 May 1876 : Knight Commander of the Order of the Bath, KCB
- 8 March 1901 : Knight Grand Cross of the Royal Victorian Order, GCVO

Coat of arms of Charles Harbord, 5th Baron Suffield
Crest On a Chapeau Gules turned up Ermine a Lion couchant Argent Escutcheon Quarterly: 1 and 4th, quarterly Azure and Gules four Lions rampant Argent and in the centre an Imperial Crown Or (Harbord); 2 and 3rd, Argent a Fleur-de-lis Gules (Morden) Supporters Dexter: a Lion Or charged on the shoulder with a Fleur-de-lis Gules and gorged with a Crown Flory Chain reflexed over the back Azure; Sinister: a Leopard guardant proper gorged with a similar Coronet and Chain Or Motto Aequanimiter (Even minded)

Political offices
Preceded by The Earl of Haddington	Lord-in-waiting; 1868–1872	Succeeded by The Earl of Kenmare
Preceded by The Marquess of Waterford	Master of the Buckhounds; 1886	Succeeded by The Earl of Coventry
Peerage of Great Britain
Preceded by Edward Harbord	Baron Suffield; 1853–1914	Succeeded by Charles Harbord
