= Charles Harbord, 6th Baron Suffield =

British Army officer and politician

Lt Col. Charles Harbord, 6th Baron Suffield, CB, MVO (14 June 1855 – 10 February 1924), was a British Army officer and British Conservative politician.

Suffield was the eldest son of Charles Harbord, 5th Baron Suffield, and his first wife Cecilia Annetta, daughter of Henry Baring, third son of Sir Francis Baring, 1st Baronet. He schooled at Eton and entered the Scots Fusilier Guards as an ensign on 30 April 1873 and was promoted lieutenant in April 1875.

Harbord was appointed second in command of the 2nd Scots Guards in December 1899 and then served in the Second Boer War, arriving with his regiment in May 1900. He took command of the 1st Scots Guards in July 1901 and was to bring them home at the war's end, leaving Cape Town on Winifredian in September 1902. For his service he was mentioned in despatches in 1901 and appointed a Companion of the Order of the Bath (CB) in the September 1901 South Africa Honours list (the award was dated to 29 November 1900). After his return home he was on 22 October 1902 received at Buckingham Palace by King Edward VII who created him a Member (4th class) of the Royal Victorian Order (MVO), and on 24 October 1902 returned there to be invested with the CB. He retired from the army in 1904.

He served as a Groom-in-Waiting to Queen Victoria from 1895 to 1901. In 1914 Suffield succeeded his father in the barony and took his seat on the Conservative benches in the House of Lords. The following year he was appointed Captain of the Yeomen of the Guard (Deputy Chief Whip in the House of Lords) in the coalition government of H. H. Asquith, a post he held until 1918, the last two years under the premiership of David Lloyd George.

Lord Suffield married in 1896 Evelyn Louisa Wilson-Patten, daughter of Captain Eustace John Wilson-Patten (eldest son of John Wilson-Patten, 1st Baron Winmarleigh). He died in February 1924, aged 68, and was succeeded by his eldest son Victor. Lady Suffield died in 1951.

== Arms ==
Coat of arms of Charles Harbord, 6th Baron Suffield
Crest On a Chapeau Gules turned up Ermine a Lion couchant Argent Escutcheon Quarterly: 1st and 4th, quarterly Azure and Gules four Lions rampant Argent and in the centre an Imperial Crown Or (Harbord); 2nd and 3rd, Argent a Fleur-de-lis Gules (Morden) Supporters Dexter: a Lion Or charged on the shoulder with a Fleur-de-lis Gules and gorged with a Crown Flory Chain reflexed over the back Azure; Sinister: a Leopard guardant proper gorged with a similar Coronet and Chain Or Motto Aequanimiter (Even minded)

Political offices
Preceded by The Earl of Craven	Captain of the Yeomen of the Guard; 1915–1918	Succeeded by The Lord Hylton
Peerage of Great Britain
Preceded by Charles Harbord	Baron Suffield; 1914–1924	Succeeded by Victor Alexander Charles Harbord
