= Harbord Harbord, 1st Baron Suffield =

British landowner and politician

The Right Honourable The Lord Suffield
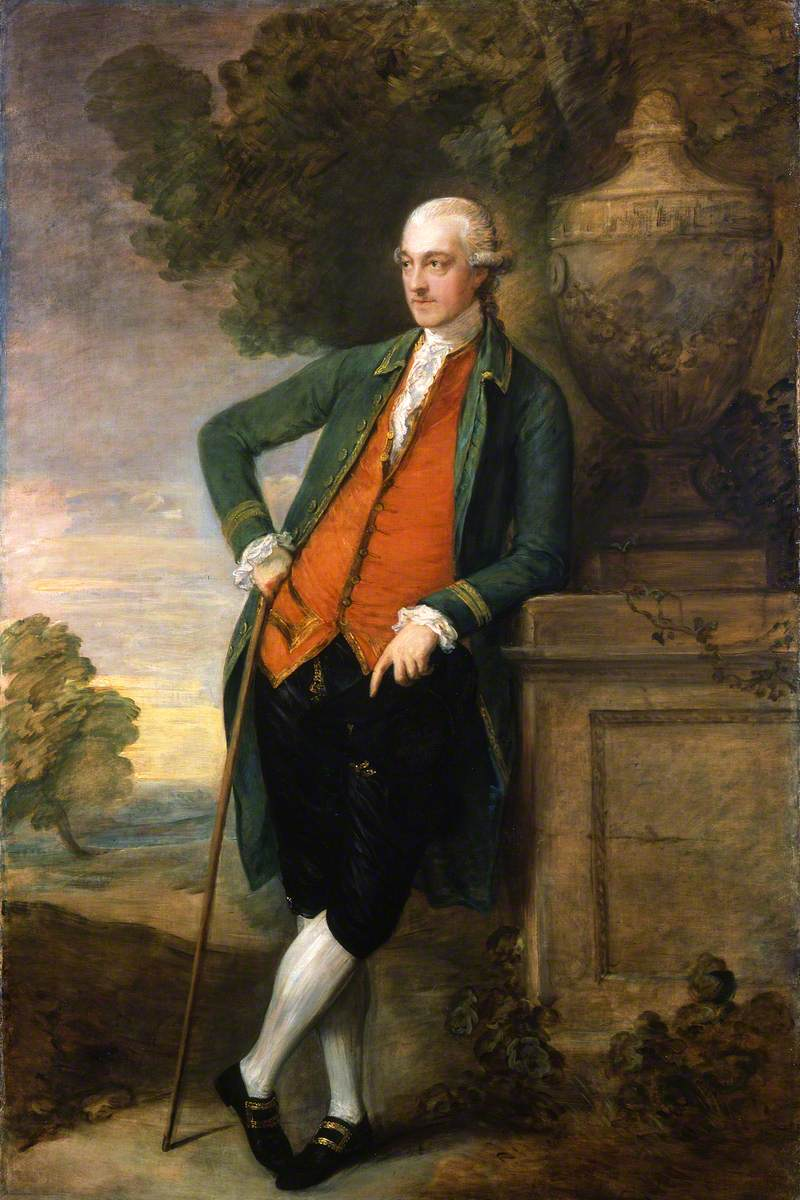
- Sir Harbord Harbord by Thomas Gainsborough, 1783 (Norwich Castle Museum)

Member of Parliament for Norwich (with Edward Bacon to 1784; with William Windham from 1784)
- In office 1756–1786
- Preceded by: Lord Hobart and Edward Bacon
- Succeeded by: William Windham and Henry Hobart

Personal details
- Born: Harbord Morden; 26 January 1734 Thorpe St Andrew, Norfolk
- Died: 4 February 1810 (aged 76)
- Party: Tory
- Spouse: Mary Assheton
- Children: William, Edward
- Parents: William Morden, later Sir William Harbord, 1st Baronet (father); Elizabeth Britiffe (mother)

Harbord Harbord, 1st Baron Suffield (26 January 1734 – 4 February 1810), known as Sir Harbord Harbord, Bt, between 1770 and 1786, was a British landowner and politician who sat in the House of Commons from 1756 to 1784 when he was raised to the peerage as Baron Suffield.

== Biography ==
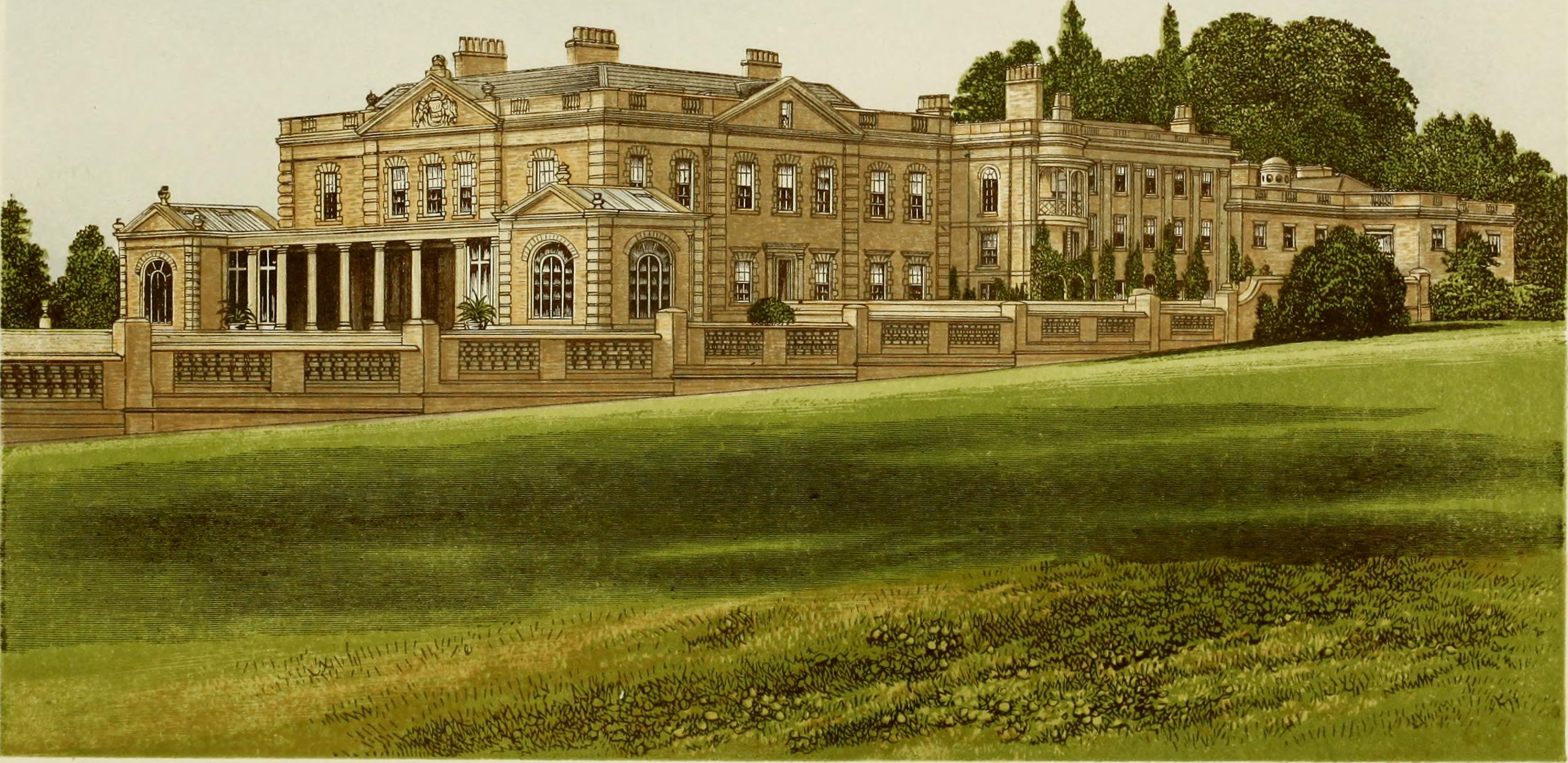
Gunton Hall in 1840

Harbord was born Harbord Morden at Thorpe, Norfolk. He was the eldest son of William Morden, later Sir William Harbord, 1st Baronet, and his wife Elizabeth Britiffe, daughter of Robert Britiffe, Recorder of Norwich. His father assumed by royal licence the surname of Harbord in lieu of Morden in 1742 according to the will of his maternal uncle, Harbord Harbord.

Harbord sat as Member of Parliament for Norwich from 1756 to 1786. He succeeded his father in the baronetcy in 1770. In 1775 Harbord commissioned James Wyatt to make significant additions to the Gunton Hall, the family's country house. In 1786 he was raised to the peerage as Lord Suffield, Baron of Suffield, in the County of Norfolk.

Lord Suffield married Mary Assheton, daughter of Sir Ralph Assheton, 3rd Baronet, in 1760. He died in February 1810, aged 76, and was succeeded in the baronetcy and barony by his eldest son, William. His younger son Edward was a radical politician and anti-slavery campaigner.

== Arms ==
Coat of arms of Harbord Harbord, 1st Baron Suffield
Crest On a Chapeau Gules turned up Ermine a Lion couchant Argent Escutcheon Quarterly: 1st and 4th, quarterly Azure and Gules four Lions rampant Argent and in the centre an Imperial Crown Or (Harbord); 2nd and 3rd, Argent a Fleur-de-lis Gules (Morden) Supporters Dexter: a Lion Or charged on the shoulder with a Fleur-de-lis Gules and gorged with a Crown Flory Chain reflexed over the back Azure; Sinister: a Leopard guardant proper gorged with a similar Coronet and Chain Or Motto Aequanimiter (Even minded)

Parliament of Great Britain
Preceded by Lord Hobart; Edward Bacon	Member of Parliament for Norwich; 1756–1786; With: Edward Bacon 1756–1784; William Windham 1784–1786	Succeeded by William Windham; Hon. Henry Hobart
Baronetage of Great Britain
Preceded by William Harbord	Baronet (of Suffield); 1770–1810	Succeeded by William Assheton Harbord
Peerage of Great Britain
New creation	Baron Suffield; 1786–1810	Succeeded by William Assheton Harbord
